= List of municipalities of the Province of Modena =

The following is a list of the 47 municipalities (comuni) of the Province of Modena in the region of Emilia-Romagna in Italy.

== List ==
| Municipality | Population (2026) | Area (km²) | Density |
|---|---|---|---|
| Bastiglia | 4,244 | 10.47 | 405.3 |
| Bomporto | 10,398 | 38.87 | 267.5 |
| Campogalliano | 8,516 | 35.69 | 238.6 |
| Camposanto | 3,397 | 22.71 | 149.6 |
| Carpi | 74,041 | 131.54 | 562.9 |
| Castelfranco Emilia | 33,625 | 102.51 | 328.0 |
| Castelnuovo Rangone | 15,116 | 22.44 | 673.6 |
| Castelvetro di Modena | 10,960 | 49.78 | 220.2 |
| Cavezzo | 7,236 | 26.77 | 270.3 |
| Concordia sulla Secchia | 8,541 | 40.97 | 208.5 |
| Fanano | 2,984 | 89.91 | 33.2 |
| Finale Emilia | 15,570 | 105.13 | 148.1 |
| Fiorano Modenese | 16,610 | 26.23 | 633.2 |
| Fiumalbo | 1,177 | 39.14 | 30.1 |
| Formigine | 34,496 | 46.74 | 738.0 |
| Frassinoro | 1,697 | 95.46 | 17.8 |
| Guiglia | 4,356 | 48.30 | 90.2 |
| Lama Mocogno | 2,679 | 63.91 | 41.9 |
| Maranello | 17,360 | 32.58 | 532.8 |
| Marano sul Panaro | 5,319 | 45.47 | 117.0 |
| Medolla | 6,531 | 27.00 | 241.9 |
| Mirandola | 24,921 | 137.09 | 181.8 |
| Modena | 184,361 | 183.19 | 1,006.4 |
| Montecreto | 951 | 31.22 | 30.5 |
| Montefiorino | 2,119 | 45.28 | 46.8 |
| Montese | 3,374 | 81.01 | 41.6 |
| Nonantola | 16,186 | 55.32 | 292.6 |
| Novi di Modena | 10,413 | 51.82 | 200.9 |
| Palagano | 2,034 | 60.41 | 33.7 |
| Pavullo nel Frignano | 18,405 | 143.73 | 128.1 |
| Pievepelago | 2,096 | 76.54 | 27.4 |
| Polinago | 1,604 | 53.74 | 29.8 |
| Prignano sulla Secchia | 3,898 | 79.67 | 48.9 |
| Ravarino | 6,388 | 28.53 | 223.9 |
| Riolunato | 657 | 44.91 | 14.6 |
| San Cesario sul Panaro | 6,676 | 27.31 | 244.5 |
| San Felice sul Panaro | 11,049 | 51.66 | 213.9 |
| San Possidonio | 3,577 | 17.06 | 209.7 |
| San Prospero | 6,261 | 34.56 | 181.2 |
| Sassuolo | 41,123 | 38.40 | 1,070.9 |
| Savignano sul Panaro | 9,591 | 25.55 | 375.4 |
| Serramazzoni | 8,980 | 93.96 | 95.6 |
| Sestola | 2,401 | 52.47 | 45.8 |
| Soliera | 15,460 | 50.93 | 303.6 |
| Spilamberto | 12,968 | 29.79 | 435.3 |
| Vignola | 26,310 | 22.86 | 1,150.9 |
| Zocca | 4,846 | 69.37 | 69.9 |

== See also ==
- List of municipalities of Emilia-Romagna
- List of municipalities of Italy
