= Mirandola Biomedical District =

- Industrial district
- Distretto biomedicale di Mirandola
- Interactive map of Mirandola Biomedical District
- Country: Italy
- Region: Emilia-Romagna
- Province: Modena
- Core city: Mirandola
- Municipalities: List: Camposanto; Cavezzo; Concordia sulla Secchia; Finale Emilia; Medolla; Mirandola; Poggio Rusco; San Felice sul Panaro; San Possidonio; San Prospero
- Time zone: UTC+1 (Central European)
  - Summer (DST): UTC+2 (CEST)

The Mirandola Biomedical District (Italian: Distretto biomedicale di Mirandola) is an industrial district in the biomedical engineering, specialised in the production of medical devices such as equipment and disposable products for therapeutic applications, located in the Mirandola area and in some neighbouring municipalities such as Medolla, Concordia sulla Secchia, Cavezzo, San Felice sul Panaro, San Possidonio, San Prospero, and Poggio Rusco.

The Mirandola Biomedical District is considered the most important in the sector in Europe and third in the world, after Minneapolis and Los Angeles in the United States of America for this reason the area is called as the 'Italian Silicon Valley of biomedicals'.

In the 1970s, the Mirandola area saw a great influx of industry in the biomedical field, witnessing the birth of numerous companies specialising in the production of disposable biomedical devices: the area of great industrial density that was coming to life became the soul of the current biomedical district, which is still expanding. During the eighties and nineties, the number of companies in the area grew considerably, bringing production specialisation to very high levels.

In 2012, on the occasion of the 50th anniversary of the birth of the first biomedical company, a museum specialising in the history and early products of Mirandola Biomedical District has been set up in the city's historic centre.

The numerous companies in the district now cater for a very wide range of healthcare areas, including haemodialysis, cardiac surgery, anesthesia e intensive care medicine, apheresis e plasmapheresis, blood transfusion, nutrition, gynaecology. The production specialisation of the companies in the Mirandola Biomedical District concerns disposable plastic products for medical use and equipment for dialysis, cardiac surgery, transfusion and other healthcare applications. The production of disposables accounts for 80% of the total, while biomedical equipment accounts for 13%. The district produces both finished products and the components needed to make disposables.

== History ==
=== Origin and development ===
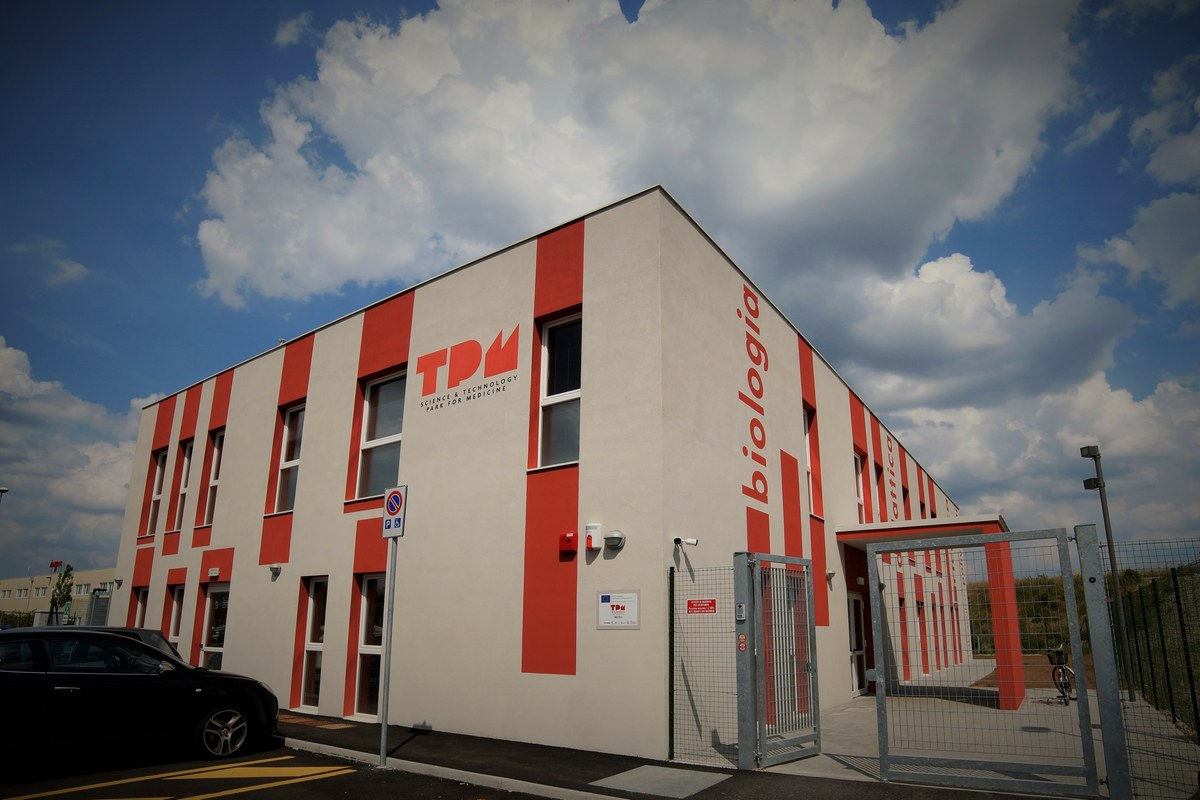
Tecnopolo TPM - Technology Park for Medicine (Mirandola)

The district was born in the 1960s, thanks to the initiative of Mario Veronesi, a pharmacist who realised the potential of the market for disposable products for medical use. In his small assembly workshop (Miraset, with only three employees), he studied and developed a new prototype of an artificial kidney, one of the most sophisticated of the few that were being produced.

From this initial nucleus, technicians and investors (including Veronesi himself) broke away several times to set up their own business projects and found other companies.

Since 2000, the favourable economic performance of these companies has attracted the interest of foreign investors and large multinationals attracted by the technological capabilities of the area, resulting in numerous changes of ownership and industrial concentration and contributing to local development.

The result is an entrepreneurial fabric characterised by a strong projection towards foreign markets and, at the same time, by a tendency to concentrate strategic and innovative activities, accompanied by the widespread diffusion of service and manufacturing activities, which are decentralised outside and entrusted to small local companies.

=== 2012 earthquake ===
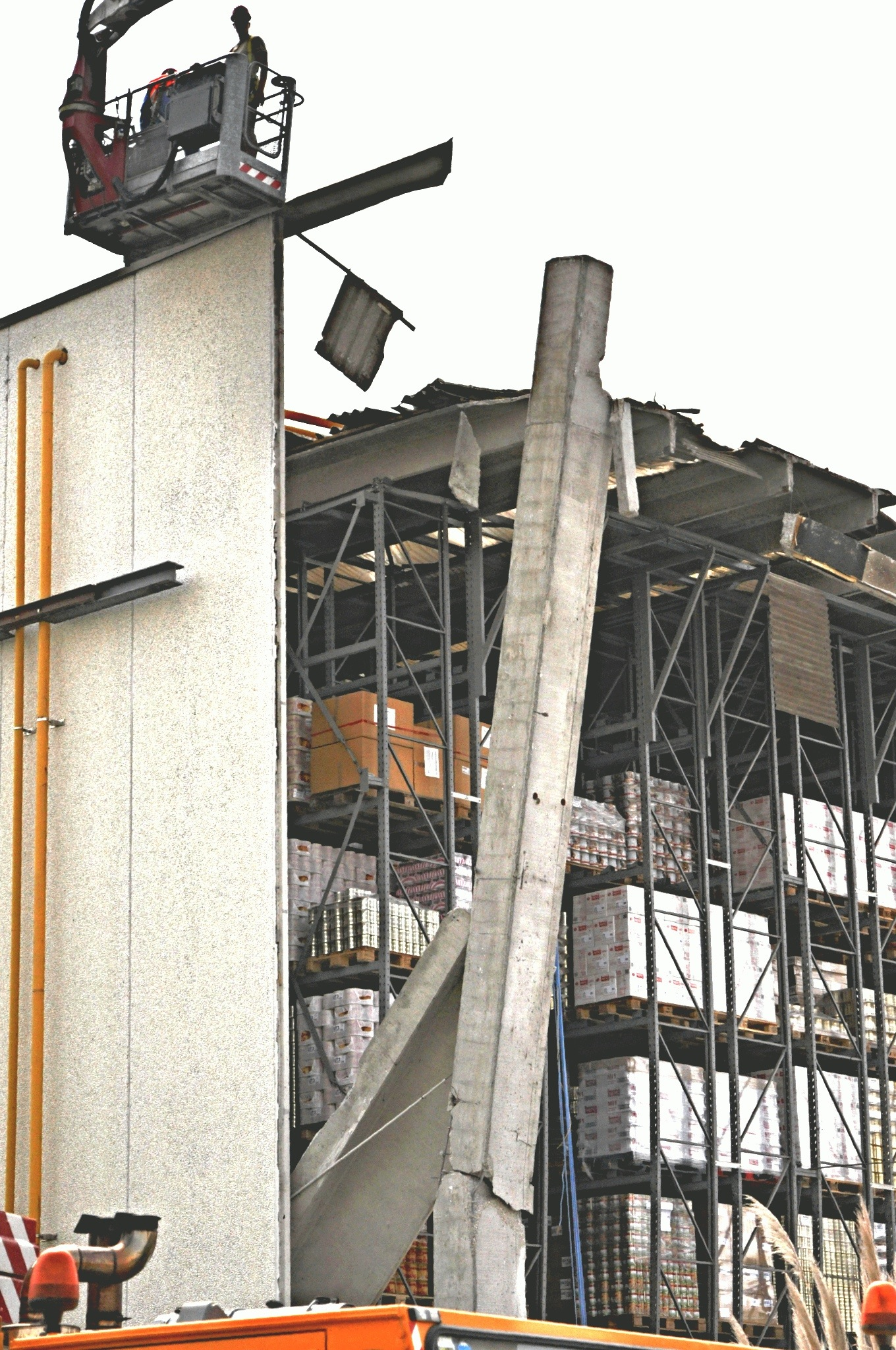
Industrial building in Mirandola damaged by the 2012 Emilia earthquake

In May 2012, a series of earthquakes devastated, along with other towns in Emilia, the northern area of the province of Modena, especially Mirandola and the neighbouring municipalities. The biomedical district suffered very serious damage from 20 May onwards, aggravated by the devastating tremor of magnitude 5.8 on 29 May, whose epicentre was just 2 km from the industrial area of San Giacomo Roncole and caused the death of four people crushed by the rubble of the Aries and BBG companies.

In spite of the very serious disruption, the companies in the district tried to start up again immediately so as not to interrupt production. The fact that many large companies belonged to international industrial groups and that many warehouses were covered by insurance against natural events (including earthquakes) meant that the financial resources needed to rebuild and restart were found more quickly than the aid promised by the state. According to a 2015 survey, only 16.4% of companies had received state compensation three years after the earthquake.

As early as 2014, lay-offs were no longer being used, while between 2015 and 2016 90% of the district's biomedical companies were back at full capacity, with even an increase in production compared to the pre-earthquake situation.

Thanks to reconstruction funds, on 10 January 2015 the Technology Park for Medicine (TPM) was inaugurated inside the new Mirandola school complex. This is a scientific-technological park for research into toxicology, proteomics, applied microscopy, cell and material biology, sensors and systems.

== District features ==
More than 300 companies (of which about 100 are medium-sized or large) with a total of almost 4 000 workers are located in the district.

Data from the Observatory on the biomedical sector in the Mirandola district for the year 2000 showed a turnover of around 1,000 billion lire and an export quota of around 61%. In 2003, production of disposables reached a value of EUR 475 million, while that of electromedical equipment was EUR 119 million. In 2014, export turnover alone amounted to around 250 million euros.

Mirandola Biomedical District is included among the Italian technological districts, thanks to the area's productive specialisation, anyone wishing to undertake an activity in the sector is encouraged to locate within the district. This reduces transport costs and encourages better communication between suppliers and companies in the district. In the case of the biomedical sector, the special feature is the high incidence of exports, a problem that is better addressed when companies are linked. However, as Mirandola is an area of agricultural origin, the organisation of the transport network was not designed for industrial movements: this still causes problems in terms of roads and traffic.

== Biomedical museum ==
The permanent exhibition of Mirandola's biomedical sector (Mobimed), inaugurated at the Castle of the Pico in 2010 and later moved to Via Odoardo Focherini, was set up with the aim of enhancing, preserving and making accessible to everyone the complex of historical and scientific assets of Mirandola's biomedical sector (disposable machines). The intention is to highlight the history and creative/productive capacities of the district since its formation in the mid-1960s.

The exhibits boast their origin from the biomedical companies themselves or from private collectors. On display are true rarities, such as the Kiil-type artificial kidney sold by Dasco in the late 1960s. At the entrance, a series of illustrative panels explain the chronology of the birth of all the companies from 1962 to 2012, also providing in-depth information and explanations about the current reality of the biomedical sector (with products and services); there is also a summary of the biography of the founder of biomedical, Mario Veronesi. The last wing of the museum is dedicated to the products/services of local companies, which alternate in the exhibition, displaying their latest medical and scientific innovations.

== Bibliography ==
- Franco Mosconi, ed. (2017). Dal garage al distretto: il biomedicale mirandolese. Storia, evoluzione, prospettive. Bologna: Il Mulino. ISBN 978-88-15-27356-7.

== See also ==
- Biomedical engineering
- Pharmaceutical industry
- 2012 Northern Italy earthquakes
- Santa Maria Bianca Hospital
