= Monster of Modena =

Unidentified Italian serial killer

Details
- Victims: 8–10
- Span of crimes: 1985–1995
- Country: Italy
- State: Emilia-Romagna
- Date apprehended: N/A

The Monster of Modena (Italian: Il Mostro di Modena) is an unidentified Italian serial killer who murdered at least eight prostitutes and drug addicts in the city of Modena from 1985 to 1995.

== Murders ==
=== Confirmed victims ===
The first victim was 18-year-old Giovanna Marchetti, who moved from Mirandola to Medolla to live with her parents and older brother. She was last seen on 12 August 1985 by her boyfriend Giuseppe Volpe, who noted down the license plates of the vehicles in which Marchetti got into, as she prostituted herself to earn money to buy heroin. On 21 August, her body, already in advanced state of decomposition, was found near the Baggiovara furnace. A bloodstained stone used to bash her head in was found near the body. Volpe, investigated but ruled out after a short time, provided the license plate of the last car Marchetti had gotten into that evening: it turned out to be a Ford belonging to farmer Ennio Cantergiani, but since there was no evidence to charge him, he was let go.

On 12 September 1987, at the San Damaso quarries, the lifeless body of 22-year-old Donatella Guerra was found. Her half-naked corpse showed signs of sexual abuse and bore numerous stab wounds to the neck and heart. As in the Marchetti murder, the purse containing her personal belongings was not found, and it was also suspected that she was killed elsewhere due to the small amount of blood found at the scene. Investigators found a shoe print and tire tracks belonging to a Fiat 131, and after analyzing the prints, it was deemed likely that the killer was left-handed and had a limp of some kind.

A little more than a month after the murder of Guerra, on 1 November, the body of 21-year-old prostitute Marina Balboni was found in a canal on the road from Carpi to Gargallo. Balboni was a friend of Guerra and had evidently been afraid of being murdered, according to her father. An autopsy determined that she had been sexually abused and then strangled with the scarf she was wearing that evening. When interviewed, Balboni's parents claimed that a few days prior to her death, Marina said that she had to urgently go to Modena for an "important appointment." Like the previous victims, her purse was never found.

On 30 May 1989, the naked, lifeless body of 24-year-old Claudia Santachiara was found at the beginning of the Brenner highway. She was found with her pants down and a noose tied around her neck, which had created a furrow in her skin and caused her death by strangulation. The autopsy, in addition to showing signs of sexual abuse, also revealed traces of DNA under Santachiara's fingernails that indicated she had fought against her assailant. A witness revealed that that evening, although he had not had sexual intercourse, he had been in Santachiara's company and left her 50,000 lire in her purse. The man claimed that the money had been stolen after the murder, but it was never clarified how he knew this detail since the purse was never found. Journalist Corrado Augias, then host of the program Telefono giallo, interviewed the witness, but the tape on which the interview was recorded was destroyed, an act blamed on political bickering in Modena. On 13 June, a convicted felon named Tommaso Nunzio Caliò was arrested after a prostitute claimed that he had attempted to rob and strangle her. Caliò's DNA was compared to that found on Santachiara's fingernails, but the results proved negative.

Ten months after Santachiara's death, the body of 21-year-old Fabiana Zuccarini was found in a ditch in San Prospero on 8 March 1990. Like Santachiara before her, she had been strangled, but her body was dressed sans for her shoes and socks. Zuccarini's parents said that their daughter had told them that she had a date that night with a man she called "the rich uncle". This man was later identified and ruled out due to a strong alibi. Investigators later pursued a drug-related lead after a close friend revealed to them that Zuccarini was supposed to escort a shipment of heroin from Bologna to Modena, but this also lead nowhere. Her father later hired a private investigator through whom he discovered that on the evening of 7 March, Zuccarini had been seen talking to a man at a club in San Felice sul Panaro. This man, when questioned, claimed that he had only given her a ride to Rivara, but when his home was searched, investigators found a pen belonging to Zuccarini. This man then became the prime suspect, but died in a car crash on 11 September 1991, due to which the case was dismissed.

On 4 February 1992, the body of 32-year-old Anna Bruzzese was found in a ditch near San Prospero. She had been stabbed multiple times and had apparently fought back against her killer due to the presence of defensive wounds on her arms and hands. Like previous victims, her handbag was never found. Another prostitute in the area reported that a few evenings earlier, Bruzzese had been forcibly pushed by some people into a dark-colored Alfa Romeo Giulietta – these people were quickly identified and questioned, but ruled out as suspects.

On 26 January 1994, the body of 21-year-old Anna Maria Palermo, killed with 12 stab wounds to the chest, was found in a canal in Corlo. Unlike previous victims, investigators found her purse at the crime scene. The main suspect in her case was a former surgeon named Alessandro Tripi, from whom Palermo had stolen a large amount of drugs. On the previous evening, several witnesses saw her get into the man's car, with a witness claiming that the license plate read "PR", matching Tripi's car. The man was eventually charged and put on trial, but acquitted due to a lack of evidence. Prior to the trial beginning, the priest in charge of a recovery community named Don Giancarlo Suffritti stated that one of his users was forced to perform sexual intercourse by a man who threatened her with a knife. The man allegedly claimed to be the killer and was suspected of involvement in the previous crimes, but was never identified.

31-year-old Monica Abate, considered the last official victim of the Monster of Modena, was found dead in her home on 3 January 1995, with a syringe stuck in her left arm. It was initially believed that she had overdosed, but this was dismissed when it was revealed that she had been suffocated, as her killer had pressed his hands over her mouth and nose, and then stuck the syringe to simulate a suicide. Abate had several bruises and wounds on her hands, and several fragments of human skin were found under fingernails. A used condom was found in the garbage and several traces of blood were found on the stairs, which turned out to belong to her roommate, Laura Bernardi. The woman, who was investigated but later acquitted in November 1997, explained that those traces came from her consuming large doses of heroin while waiting for Abate's mother to arrive, who had called her precisely because she was keeping silent on her daughter's death. A witness later that on that morning, at around 4 AM, a car belonging to a carabiniere was in front of the woman's home long before the body was found. The investigation focused on two police officers who had contact with Abate, one of whom had a history of visiting prostitutes. Their DNA was compared to that found under Abate's fingernails, but the match proved to be negative.

=== Suspected victims ===
Besides the eight official victims, the Monster of Modena is suspected to be involved in the murders of two other prostitutes.

The first of these was 43-year-old Filomena Gnasso, whose body was found on Soratore Street in the Livestock Market of Modena by a garbage collector on 15 November 1983. The woman, originally from Aversa, had resided in Modena for years and had been stabbed five times. The case was quickly dismissed and attributed to a local prostitution racket, since Gnasso was known to frequent these circles.

The second was Antonietta Sottosanti. On the afternoon of 13 October 1990, a fire broke out in the Windsor Park apartment buildings in Modena, and after the fire department extinguished it, they found Sottosanti's body in one of the apartments. She had a nylon stocking wrapped around her throat, with investigators suspecting that the killer set the fire in order to destroy evidence at the crime scene.

== Current status ==
The then-deputy prosecutor Vito Zincani, who had investigated the murders, returned to Modena in 2008 as chief prosecutor and stated that some members of the Police and the carabinieri at the time were arrested for corruption. He also claimed that the investigation was not done properly, with the officers involved putting in minimal effort to solve the murders.

The case was officially reopened in 2019, and local authorities are reportedly working to solve all the murders.

== See also ==
- List of serial killers by country

== In the media and culture ==
A documentary film called "Blue Lips – the Monster of Modena" (Italian: Labbra Blu – il mostro di Modena), directed by Gabriele Veronesi, was filmed in 2019 and covered the murders.

== Bibliography ==
- Giovanni Iozzoli (2020). Il mostro di Modena: Otto femminicidi ancora irrisolti [The Monster of Modena: Eight still unsolved feminicides] (in Italian). Artestampa Edizioni.
- Luigi Guicciardi (2022). Il ritorno del mostro di Modena. La prima indagine del commissario Torrisi [The Return of the Monster of Modena. Commissioner Torrisi's first investigation.] (in Italian). Damster Edizioni.
