= Vittorio Zucconi =

Italian journalist and author (1944–2019)

Grande Ufficiale dell'OMRI Vittorio Zucconi
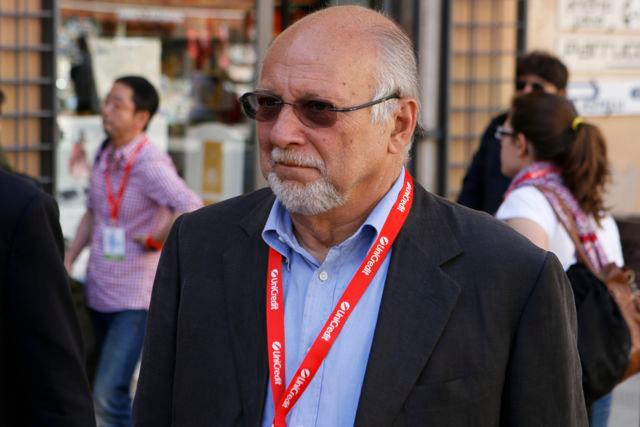
- Zucconi at the 2012 International Journalism Festival
- Born: 16 August 1944; Bastiglia, Kingdom of Italy
- Died: 25 May 2019 (aged 74); Washington D.C., U.S.
- Resting place: Arenzano cemetery
- Citizenship: American (2002–2019)
- Education: Liceo classico Giuseppe Parini (1958–1963); University of Milan
- Occupation: Author
- Spouse: Alisa Tibaldi (m. 1969)
- Children: 2
- Parent: Guglielmo Zucconi (1919–1998; father)
- Relatives: Guido Zucconi (1950–; brother)
- Writing career
- Years active: 1967–2019
- Notable awards: Grande ufficiale OMRI (2009)

Vittorio Guido Zucconi (Italian pronunciation: [vitˈtɔːrjo ddzukˈkoːni, - ttsu-]; 16 August 1944 – 26 May 2019) was an Italian journalist and author. He also had U.S. citizenship.

== Early years and education ==
Zucconi was born in Bastiglia, Province of Modena, Kingdom of Italy. After completing his secondary school at a Classical college, Zucconi received a degree in literature and philosophy from the University of Milan.

== Career ==
Zucconi was director of the online edition of the Italian newspaper La Repubblica, and served as the U S. correspondent for the same newspaper. He had previously been a reporter for the Italian daily newspaper Corriere della Sera from Moscow, and for La Stampa from Brussels and Tokyo. Zucconi was also known for several appearances on TV shows as an editorialist. Since summer 2007, he had been teaching graduate classes on Italian history and journalism at Middlebury College in Vermont. He received the America Award of the Italy-USA Foundation in 2015.

== Selected bibliography ==
- Il Giappone tra noi (1986)
- Si fa presto a dire America (1988)
- Parola di giornalista (1990)
- Si fa presto a dire Russia (1992)
- Stranieri come noi (1993)
- Gli spiriti non dimenticano: il mistero di Cavallo Pazzo e la tragedia dei Sioux (1996)
- Storie dell'altro mondo: la faccia nascosta dell'America (1997)
- Il calcio in testa (2003)
- George. Vita e miracoli di un uomo fortunato (2004)

== Personal life ==
Zucconi was married and had two children. He died in May 2019, after a long illness.

== Gallery ==
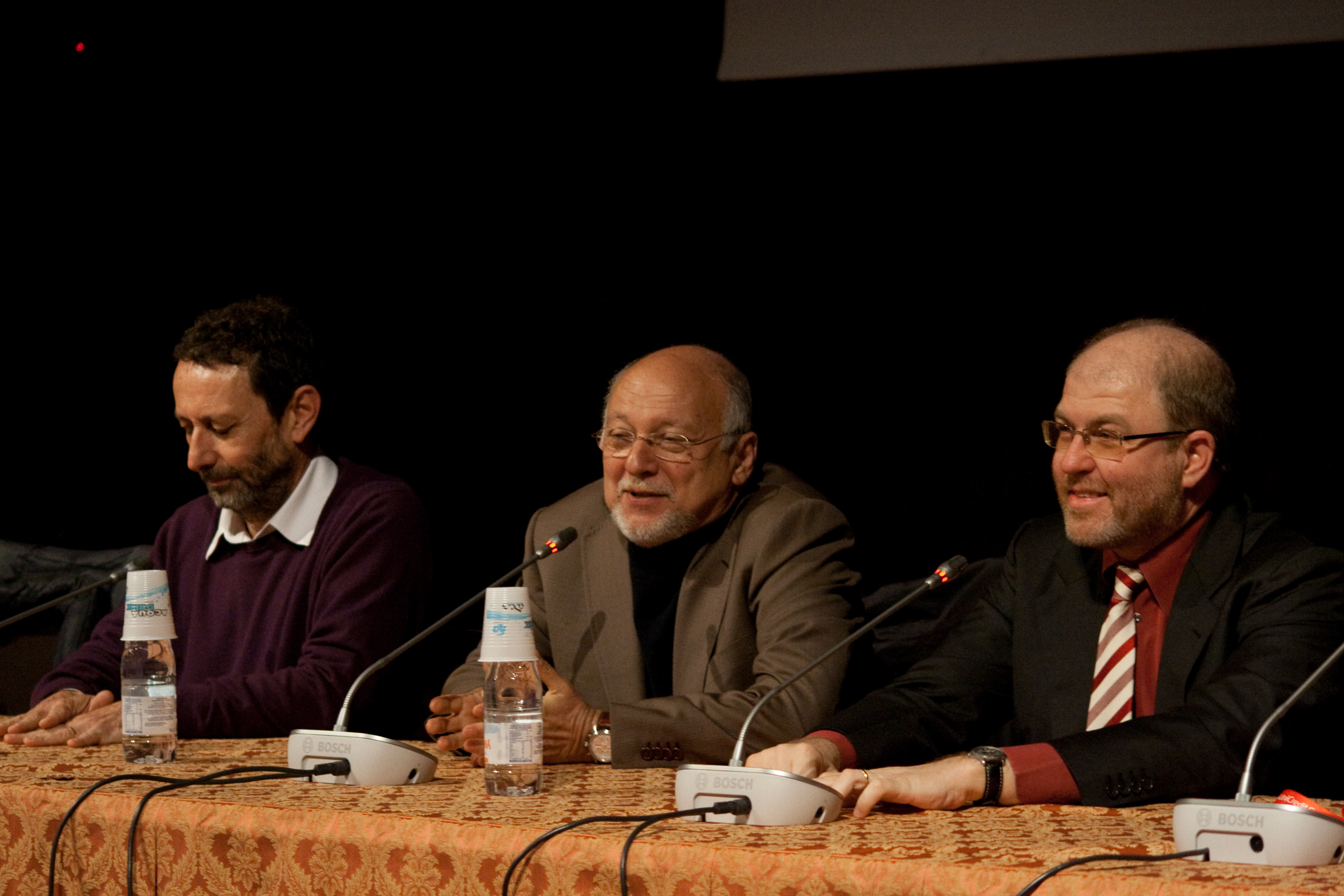
Left: Michele Serra, Vittorio Zucconi and Massimo Gramellini at the International Journalism Festival, Perugia, 2010
