= San Giovanni Battista, Spilamberto =

Roman Catholic church in Modena, Italy

Coordinates: 44.533208°N 11.025115°E

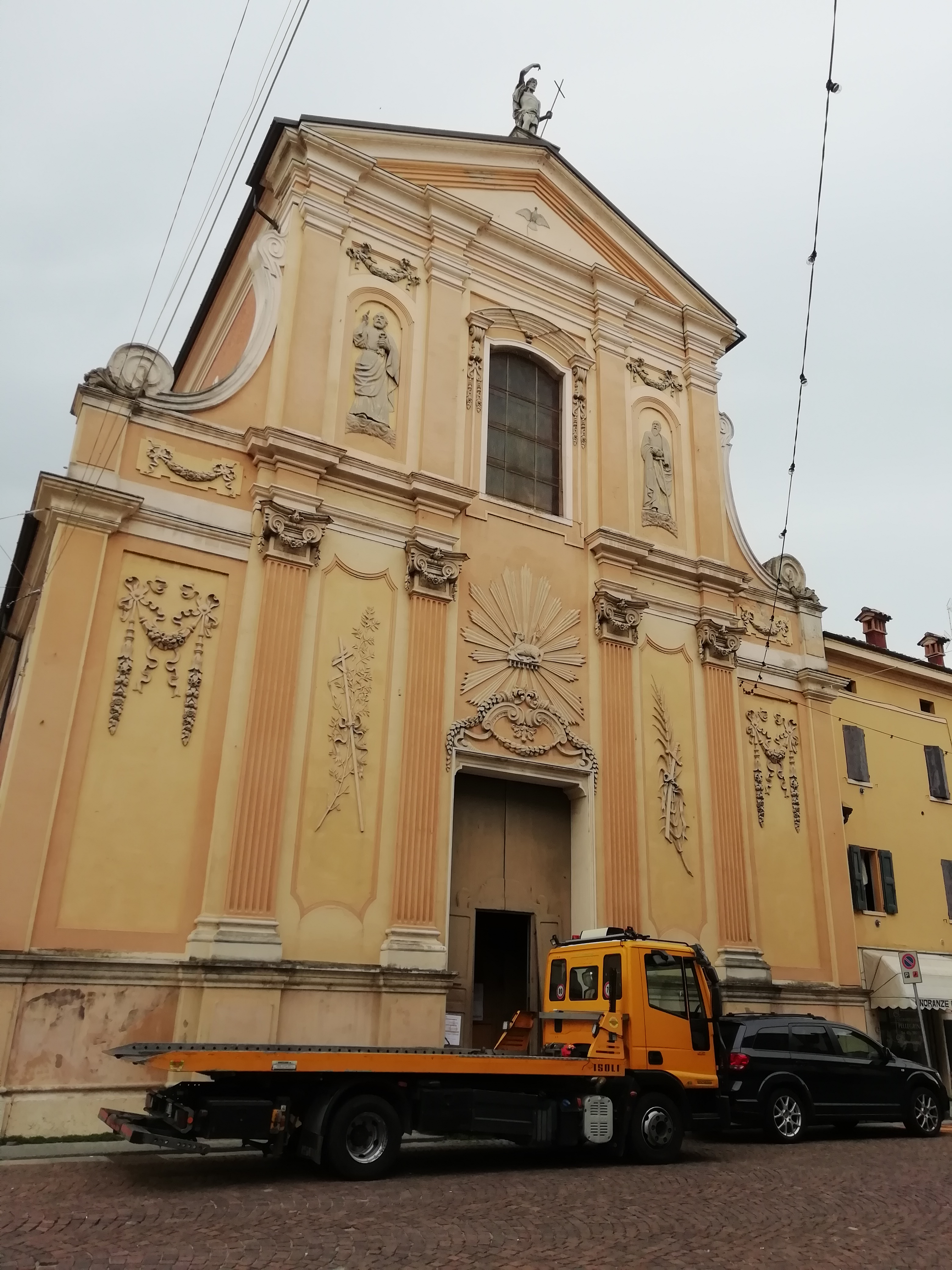
Church of San Giovanni Battista, Spilamberto commune, Italy

Sant'Adriano III Papa is a Roman Catholic church located on Via San Carlo in Spilamberto, province of Modena, region of Emilia-Romagna, Italy.

== History ==
A church was founded in 1210, as a subsidiary church to the Pieve of San Vito. Only in 1628 was it elevated to arcipretura. The original church was smaller and oriented with an apse to the east of the façade; in 1736-1757, it was rebuilt in the present state with a façade and bell tower completed in 1892.

The interior has a Baroque decoration. In 1863, the sculptor Prudenzio Piccioli and the wood-engraver Giuseppe Tacconi worked together in the Chapel of the Rosary. Piccioli sculpted the statue of Saints Pope Pius V and Dominic, as well as reliefs with the Mysteries of the Rosary. Tacconi completed wood decoration. Giuseppe Obici completed a stucco St John the Baptist, submitted in 1852 as a model for a marble statue completed for Santa Maria sopra Minerva. From 1890 to 1915, the painter Augusto Valli frescoes a number of works in the church including a Battle of Lepanto for the Chapel of the Rosary; a Vision of the Apocalypse for the cupola; a Communion of the Apostles for the half-dome of the apse; an Annunciation and angels for the nave ceiling; as well as Popes and Saints linked to Spilamberto. He also painted five altarpieces including a Glory of St Josephy, Ecce Agnus Dei, St Anne and the Virgin Mary as a Girl, Sacred Heart of Jesus, and St Anthony of Padua.
