= San Martino Vallata, Polinago =

Church building in San Martino in Vallata, Polinago, Italy

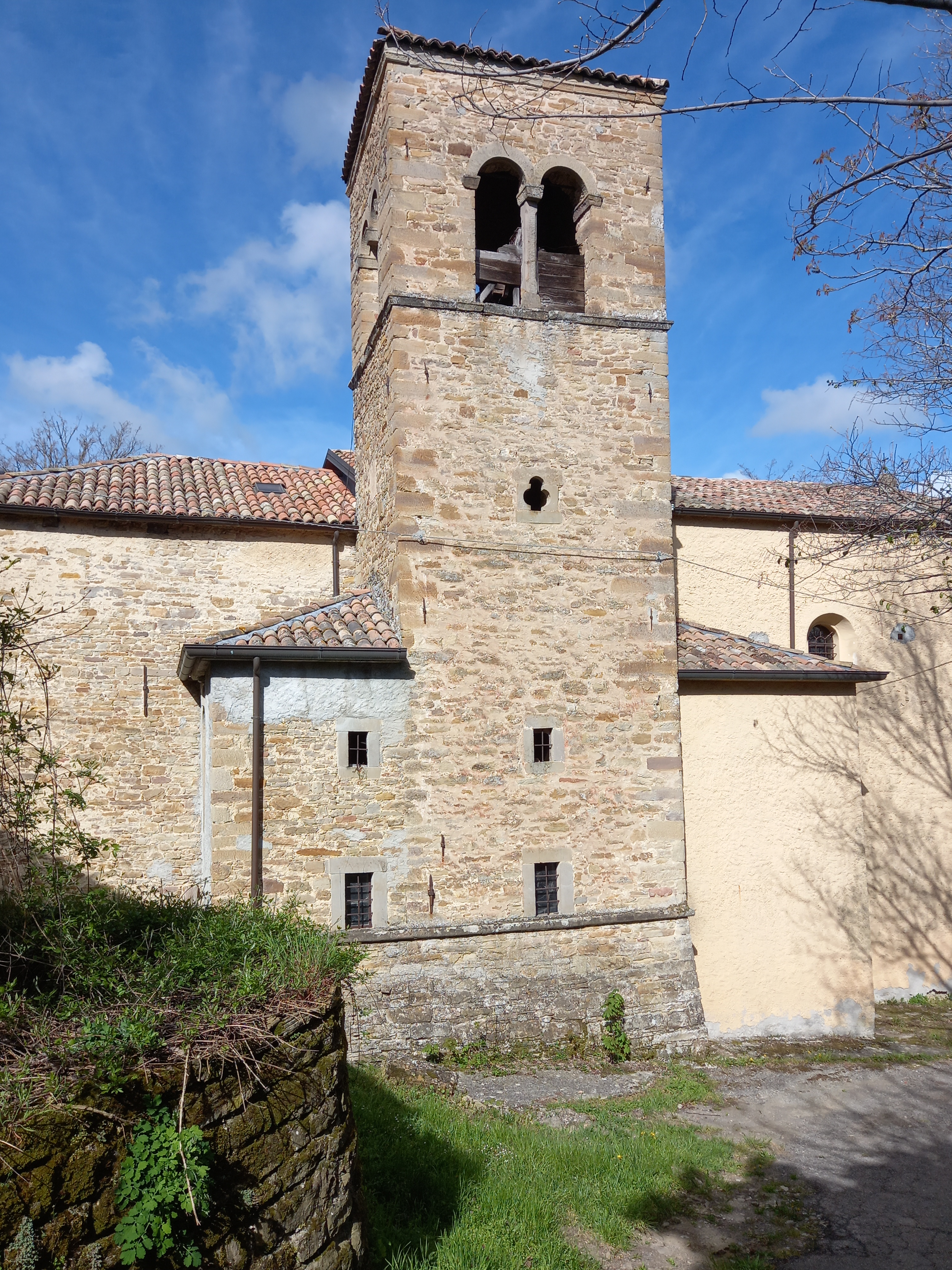
The bell tower of San Martino

San Martino Vallata is Roman Catholic parish church located at Corso Roma #71 (or Via San Martino Vallata) in the town of Polinago, in the region of Emilia-Romagna, Italy.

== History ==
A church here predates its elevation to parish church in 1627, when it was first place under the control of the Diocese of Cassano. In 1746, a landslide razed the church. The parish rebuilt this church, with a neo-Romanesque facade and mullioned windows in the bell-tower, not far from the prior spot, reconsecrated in 1756.
