= Pieve di Sorbara =

Church in Sorbara, Italy

The Pieve di Sorbara is a Romanesque-style, Catholic church located on Via Verdeta in the frazione of Sorbara of the town of Bomporto, province of Modena, region of Emilia-Romagna, Italy.

== History ==
A church in Sorbara was documented by the year 816 in archives of Modena. Dedicated to St Agatha, the present Romanesque structure dates mainly to the 12th-century. Above the portal is a plaque with a sculpted lion, symbol of the evangelist St Mark. The interior has a central nave and two aisles. The tall brick bell-tower arises separately from the church.
