= Camposanto =

- Comune
- Comune di Camposanto
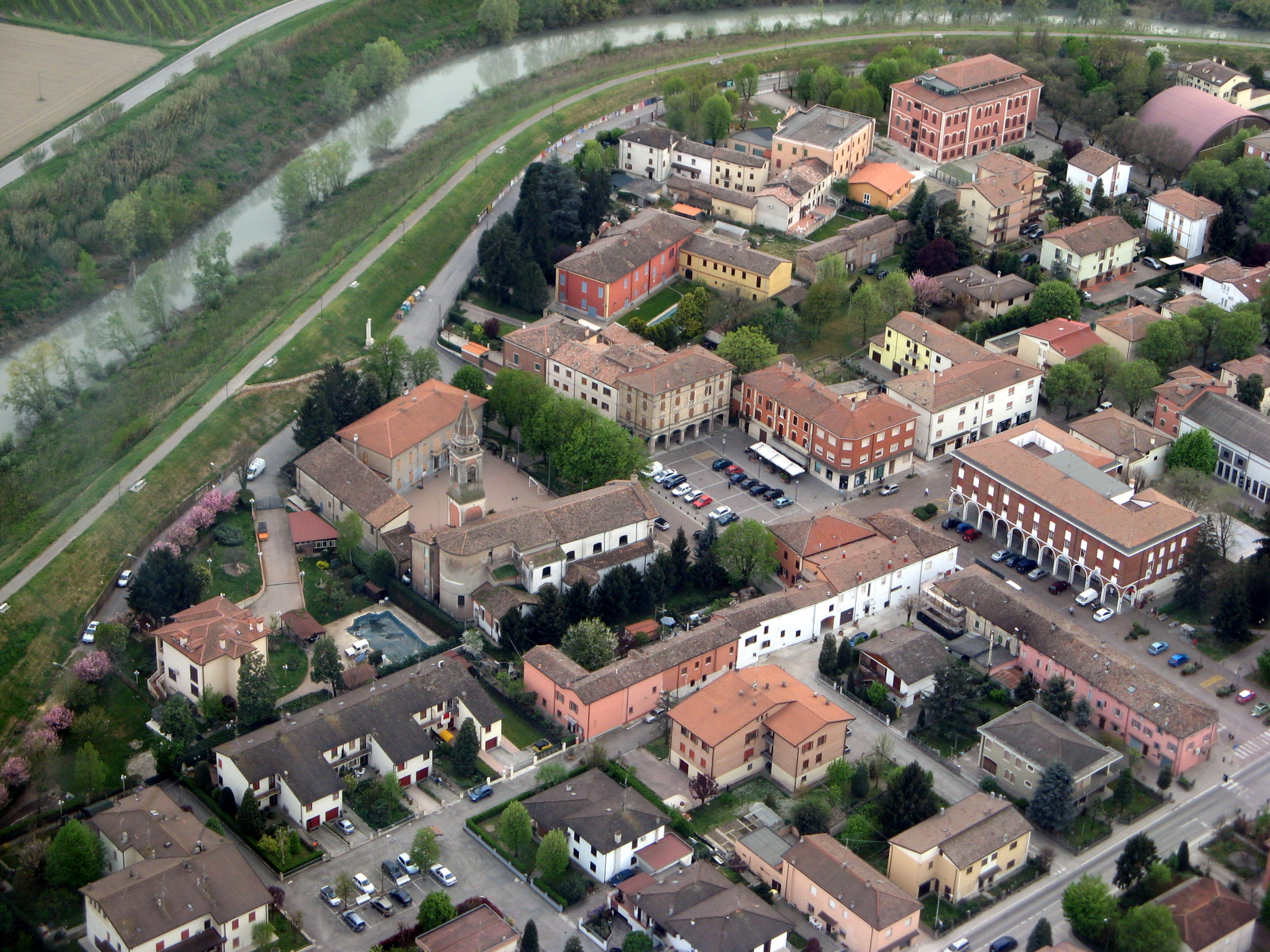

- Location within Italy Location within Emilia-Romagna
- Coordinates: 44°47′N 11°8′E
- Country: Italy
- Region: Emilia-Romagna
- Province: Modena (MO)

Government
  - Mayor: Monja Zaniboni

Area
  - Total: 22.71 km^{2} (8.77 sq mi)
- Elevation: 21 m (69 ft)

Population (30 April 2017)
  - Total: 3,181
  - Density: 140.1/km^{2} (362.8/sq mi)
- Demonym: Camposantesi
- Time zone: UTC+1 (CET)
  - Summer (DST): UTC+2 (CEST)
- Postal code: 41031
- Dialing code: 0535
- Website: Official website

Camposanto (Modenese: Campsànt; Mirandolese: Campsènt) is a comune (municipality) in the Province of Modena in the Italian region Emilia-Romagna, located about 35 kilometres (22 mi) northwest of Bologna and about 20 kilometres (12 mi) northeast of Modena on the Panaro river. Although the name in Italian literally means "holy field", which normally means "cemetery" in Italian, its original (Latin) name, "Campus Sanctus", probably honoured the 14th century Ferrara family of Santi, who owned the land.

The Battle of Campo Santo was fought here in 1743.

Camposanto borders the following municipalities: Bomporto, Crevalcore, Finale Emilia, Medolla, Ravarino, San Felice sul Panaro, San Prospero.

In May 2012 Camposanto was the epicenter of a 6.0-magnitude earthquake.
