= Cavezzo =

- Comune
- Comune di Cavezzo
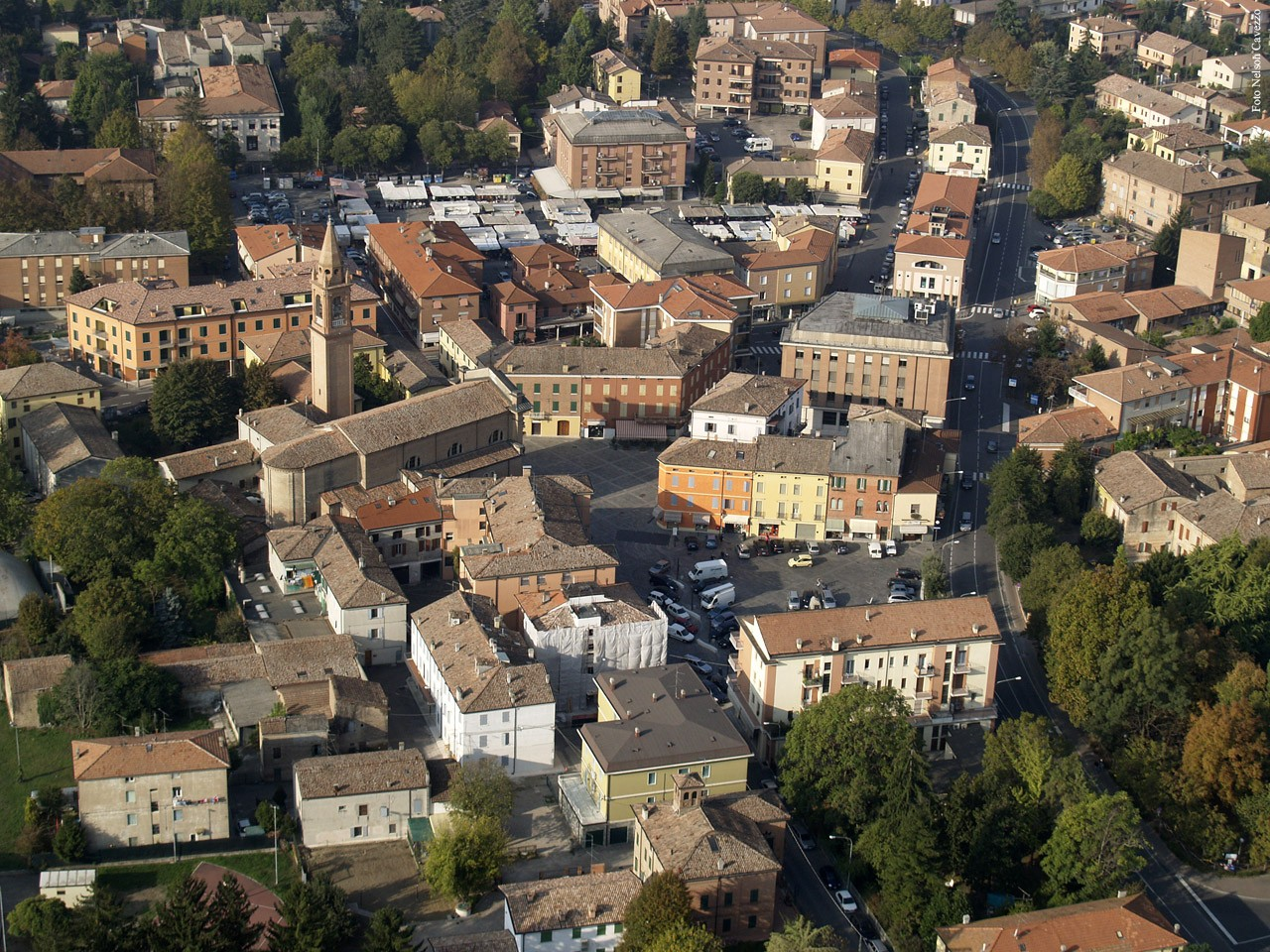

- Location within Italy Location within Emilia-Romagna
- Coordinates: 44°50′N 11°2′E
- Country: Italy
- Region: Emilia-Romagna
- Province: Modena (MO)
- Frazioni: Motta, Disvetro

Government
  - Mayor: Stefano Venturini

Area
  - Total: 26.77 km^{2} (10.34 sq mi)
- Elevation: 22 m (72 ft)

Population (30 June 2017)
  - Total: 7,014
  - Density: 262.0/km^{2} (678.6/sq mi)
- Demonym: Cavezzesi
- Time zone: UTC+1 (CET)
  - Summer (DST): UTC+2 (CEST)
- Postal code: 41032
- Dialing code: 0535
- Website: Official website

Cavezzo (Mirandolese: Cavêż) is a comune (municipality) in the Province of Modena in the Italian region Emilia-Romagna, located about 45 kilometres (28 mi) northwest of Bologna and about 20 kilometres (12 mi) northeast of Modena.

Cavezzo borders the following municipalities: Carpi, Medolla, Mirandola, Novi di Modena, San Possidonio, San Prospero.

== Physical geography ==
The area of Cavezzo is located in the Modenese lowlands. It confines with Mirandola e San Possidonio in the north, Medolla in the east, San Prospero in the south and Carpi and Novi di Modena in the west.

Cavezzo has a typically temperate continental climate of the Po Valley and of mid-latitudes. Like in the rest of the surrounding valley, winters are moderately harsh, with little rain and frequent fog. Summers are hot and humid in July and August, with temperatures that can increase above 35 degrees and with stormy precipitations. Springs and autumns are generally rainy. In spring and autumn, the climate is milder and more humid.

== Origins of the name ==
The name could come from the Latin word cavaedium that means “space closed by walls” in the form cavaedicium.

== History ==
In ancient times, Cavezzo was a part of Caesar's ancient community dependent on the Abbey of Nonantola.

The village is cited in an 1140s document and later in 1203 it is mentioned as the “Island of St Giles” because in the same year an oratory was built in honour of the Saint. It is mentioned as cavaedicium only in 1322, and it was part of the Court of Roncaglia. The River Secchia, at the time, flowed through the middle of the village, later through several canals were made that to this day pass under the village and thus liken Cavezzo to Venice and Ravenna. The church of St Giles, founded as an oratory in 1203, became a church in 1352 and a parish church in 1641. Another important sacred building is the church in the hamlet of Motta of the 16th century, even though the church existed already in 1492 and the bell tower probably dates to the 14th century.

During the period of the Black Death, because of the many deaths, a lot of catacombs were built in the rural areas close to the village. They are mentioned in documents dated 1349.

Until 1796, the settlement was classified simply as “villa” of the inferior district of the municipality of Modena. During the Napoleonic era it became a municipality including Motta, Disvetro and Medolla. In 1815, Cavezzo was added as a “section” to the municipality of Mirandola. Following the Unification of Italy, in 1860 it became an independent municipality.

Cavezzo suffered a lot of damage due to the earthquake of Emilia in 2012; in particular because of the 29 May quakes that caused two deaths and destroyed many areas in the village.

== Sport ==
Football

The main football team of the city is Polisportiva Dilettantistica Cavezzo.

Cycling

In 1932 the cyclist Nino Borsari (1911-1996), born in Villa Motta, managed to win the gold medal in the team pursuit at the Olympics in Los Angeles. In the following years, a velodrome was built in order to allow Borsari to train, but because of the war, he was stuck in Australia where he remained permanently and became an important point of reference for Italian emigrants. Until the ‘50s, the velodrome of Cavezzo hosted numerous cycling reunions, with the participation of great cycling champions including Fausto Coppi and Gino Bartali. In 1973 the world record was established for 24 hours on tandem, covering 1,787 laps of the track for a total of 682 km. In September 1975, the velodrome and the stadium were named after Nino Borsari who, for the occasion, came back from Australia to attend the ceremony.

Basketball

The female team Basket Cavezzo, sponsored for years by the local company “Acetum”, played for several seasons in the A1 and A2 leagues. Now it takes part in the regional championship in serie B.
