= Soliera =

- Comune
- Comune di Soliera
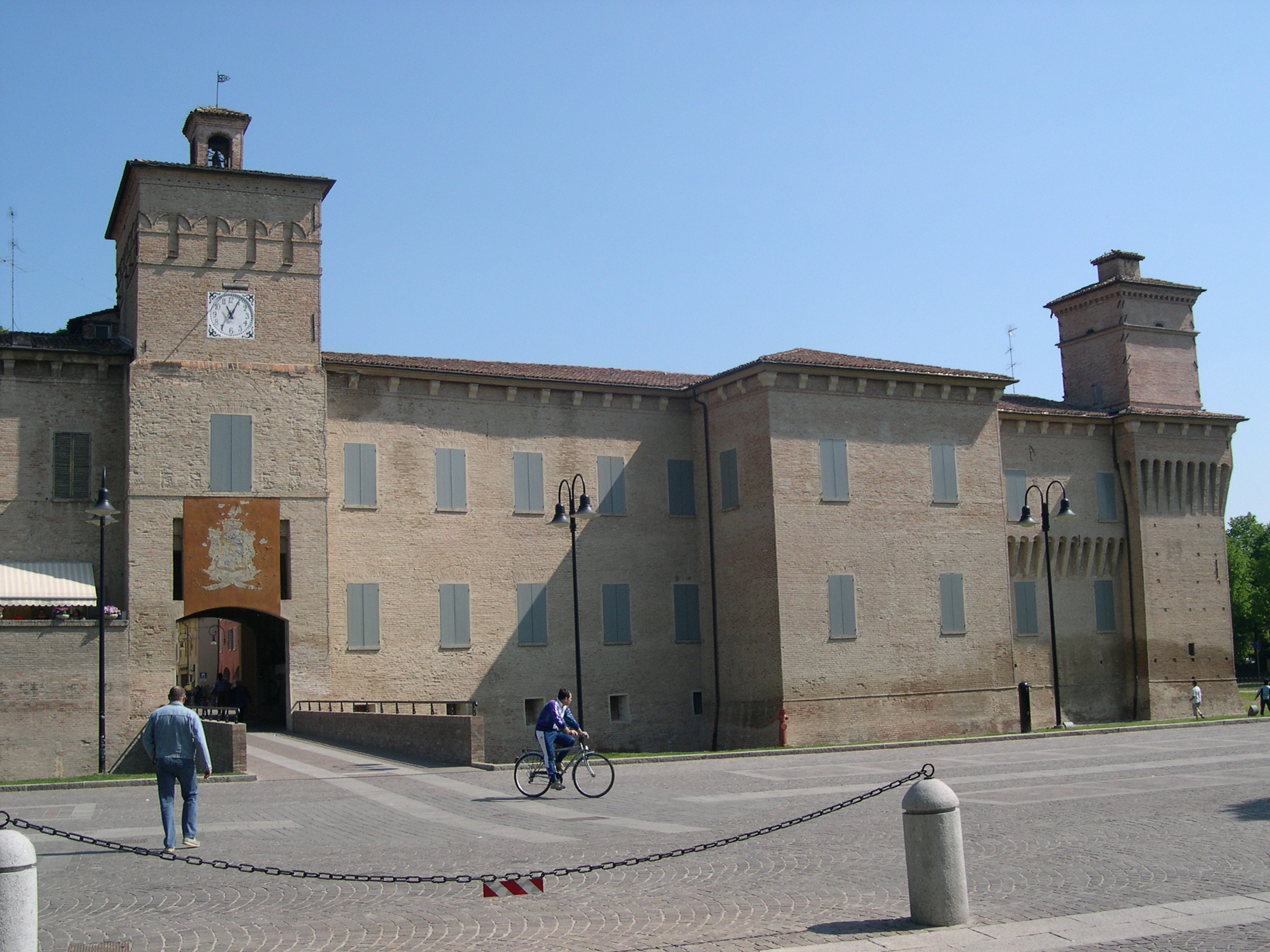

- Flag Coat of arms

- Location within Italy Location within Emilia-Romagna
- Coordinates: 44°44′N 10°56′E
- Country: Italy
- Region: Emilia-Romagna
- Province: Modena (MO)
- Frazioni: Sozzigalli, Castello di Sozzigalli, Secchia, Limidi, Appalto

Government
  - Mayor: Caterina Bagni

Area
  - Total: 50.93 km^{2} (19.66 sq mi)
- Elevation: 28 m (92 ft)

Population (30 November 2015)
  - Total: 15,473
  - Density: 303.8/km^{2} (786.9/sq mi)
- Demonym: Solieresi
- Time zone: UTC+1 (CET)
  - Summer (DST): UTC+2 (CEST)
- Postal code: 41019
- Dialing code: 059
- Website: Official website

Soliera (Modenese: Sulêra) is a comune (municipality) in the Province of Modena in the Italian region Emilia-Romagna, located about 40 kilometres (25 mi) northwest of Bologna and about 9 kilometres (6 mi) north of Modena.

Soliera borders the following municipalities: Bastiglia, Bomporto, Carpi, Modena, San Prospero.

== Twin towns ==
Soliera is twinned with:

- Paiporta, Spain
