= Castelvetro di Modena =

- Comune
- Comune di Castelvetro di Modena
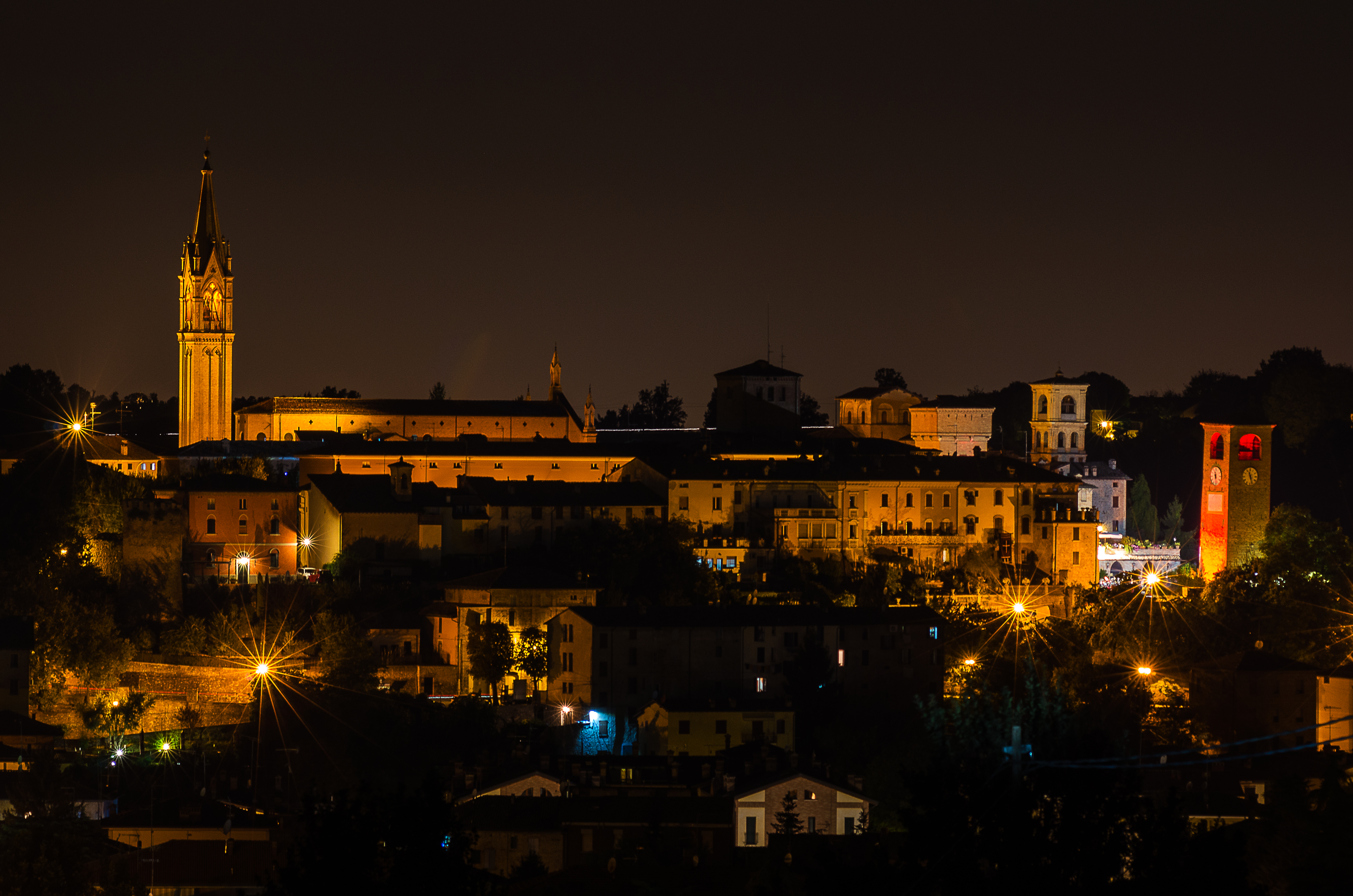
- Panoramic view by night

- Coat of arms

- Castelvetro within the Province of Modena

- Location within Italy Location within Emilia-Romagna
- Coordinates: 44°30′N 10°57′E
- Country: Italy
- Region: Emilia-Romagna
- Province: Modena (MO)
- Frazioni: Ca' di Sola, Ca' Gatti, Ca' Montanari, Casa Re, Levizzano Rangone, Madonna di Puianello, Sant'Eusebio, Settecani, Solignano Nuovo

Government
  - Mayor: Federico Poppi

Area
  - Total: 49.78 km^{2} (19.22 sq mi)
- Elevation: 122 m (400 ft)

Population (31 March 2017)
  - Total: 11,220
  - Density: 225.4/km^{2} (583.8/sq mi)
- Demonym: Castelvetresi
- Time zone: UTC+1 (CET)
  - Summer (DST): UTC+2 (CEST)
- Postal code: 41014
- Dialing code: 059
- Patron saint: Sts. Tenesio and Teopompo
- Saint day: May 21
- Website: Official website

Castelvetro di Modena (Modenese: Castelvêder) is a town and comune (municipality) in the Province of Modena in the Italian region Emilia-Romagna, located about 30 kilometres (19 mi) west of Bologna and about 15 kilometres (9 mi) south of Modena.

== Geography ==
The municipality borders Castelnuovo Rangone, Formigine, Maranello, Marano sul Panaro, Spilamberto, Serramazzoni and Vignola. It counts the hamlets (frazioni) of Ca' di Sola, Ca' Gatti, Ca' Montanari, Casa Re, Levizzano Rangone, Madonna di Puianello, Sant'Eusebio, Settecani and Solignano Nuovo.

== Main sights ==
- Six medieval towers in the historic center
- Sanctuary of Puianello
- Castle of Levizzano Rangone
- Oratory of St Michael, also at Levizzano Rangone
- Santi Senesio e Teopompo - church rebuilt in 1907 in neo-gothic style

== Gallery ==
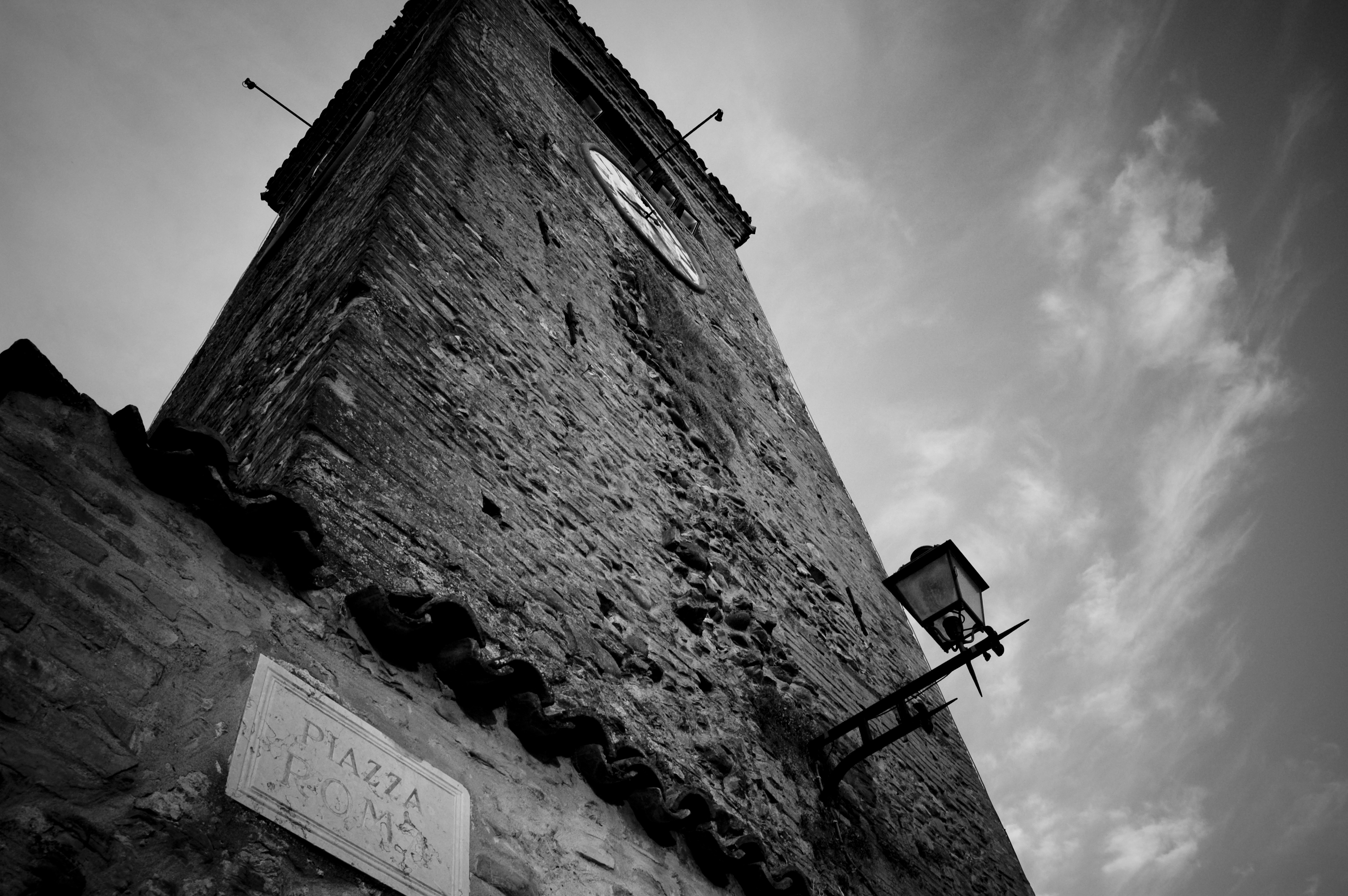
The clock tower

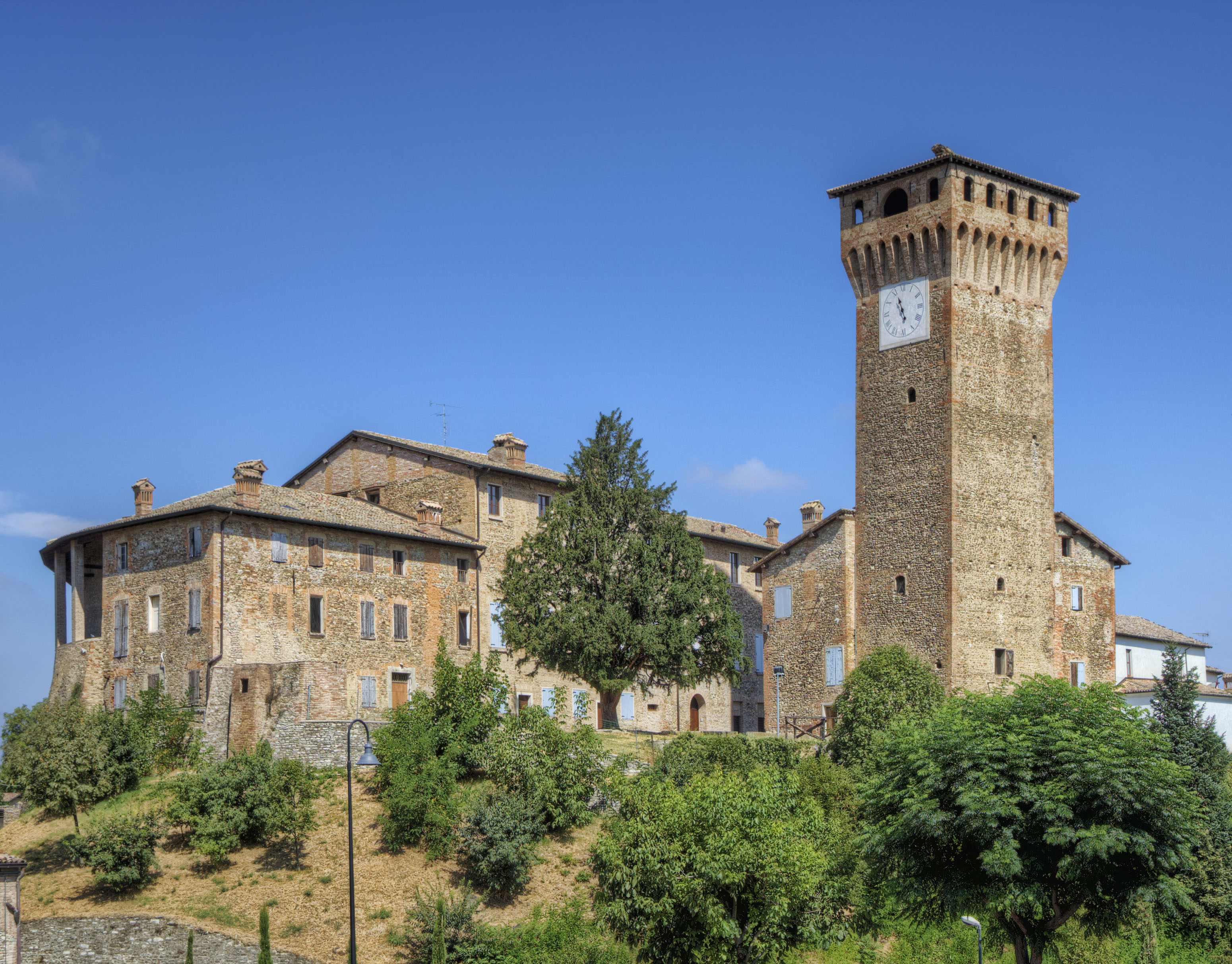
The castle of Levizzano

== Personalities ==
- Celestino Cavedoni
- Giovanni Muzzioli (1854–1894), painter

== Twin towns ==
- Castelfidardo, Italy, since 1984
- Montlouis-sur-Loire, France, since 2002
