= Santa Maria Assunta, Polinago =

Roman Catholic parish church

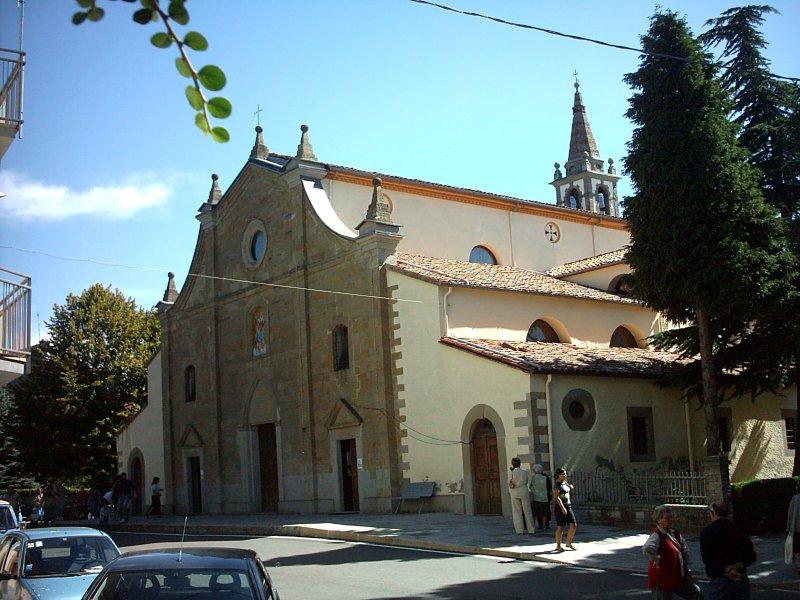
Polinago chiesa parrochiale.jpg

Santa Maria Assunta is Roman Catholic parish church located in the frazione of Cinghianello, outside of the town of Polinago in the region of Emilia-Romagna, Italy.

== History ==
A church at this panoramic site is documented since 1073, patronized likely by Matilda of Canossa; but the present structure dates from 1510, as recalled in an inscription on the main portal. The present facade, with three orders and a central oculus, was erected only in 1842. It underwent a major restoration in 1891, with the erection of a new bell-tower at the site of a prior campanile.

The adjacent oratory, dedicated to Santa Maria Bambina, was being decorated in August 1896 by professor Luigi Manzini from the Academy of Modena, when the painter died in a fall from a scaffold. This Manzini is likely a descendant of Luigi Manzini (died 1866) or his brother, Ferdinand Manzini, both painters from Modena.

The oratory was designed by Carlo Barbieri and completed in 1898. The frescoes were ultimately completed by Battista Cortelloni. The external bas reliefs (1845) depict the Garden of Eden, the Curse of the Serpent, the image of Mary as a child on a golden throne. The images tie in with the cult of the Immaculate Conception.

The church underwent a major refurbishment in the 18th century, In 1799 it acquired an organ (1500) built by Baldassarre Malamini.
