= Bomporto =

- Comune
- Comune di Bomporto
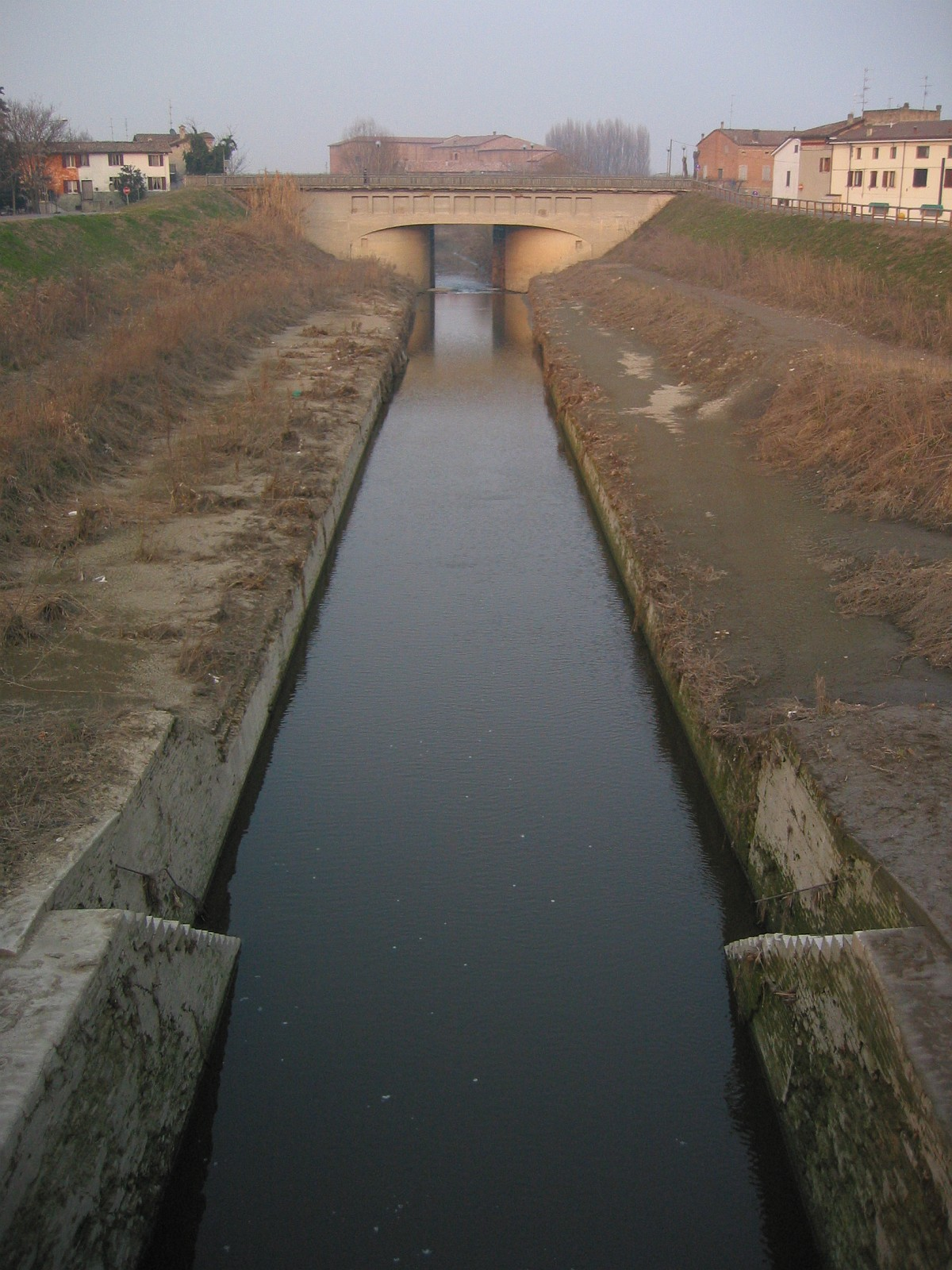
- Porte Vinciane.

- Location within Italy Location within Emilia-Romagna
- Coordinates: 44°44′N 11°2′E
- Country: Italy
- Region: Emilia-Romagna
- Province: Modena (MO)
- Frazioni: Gorghetto, San Michele, Solara, Sorbara, Villavara

Government
  - Mayor: Tania Meschiari

Area
  - Total: 38.87 km^{2} (15.01 sq mi)
- Elevation: 20 m (66 ft)

Population (30 April 2017)
  - Total: 10,141
  - Density: 260.9/km^{2} (675.7/sq mi)
- Demonym: Bomportesi
- Time zone: UTC+1 (CET)
  - Summer (DST): UTC+2 (CEST)
- Postal code: 41030
- Dialing code: 059
- Website: Official website

Bomporto (Modenese: Bumpòrt) is a comune (municipality) in the Province of Modena in the Italian region Emilia-Romagna, located about 35 kilometres (22 mi) northwest of Bologna and about 12 kilometres (7.5 mi) northeast of Modena.

Bomporto borders the following municipalities: Bastiglia, Camposanto, Medolla, Modena, Nonantola, Ravarino, San Prospero, Soliera.

The town limits hold the Pieve di Sorbara, a romanesque parish church.

== Twin towns ==
Bomporto is twinned with:

- Mola di Bari, Italy, since 2013
