= Castelnuovo Rangone =

- Comune
- Comune di Castelnuovo Rangone
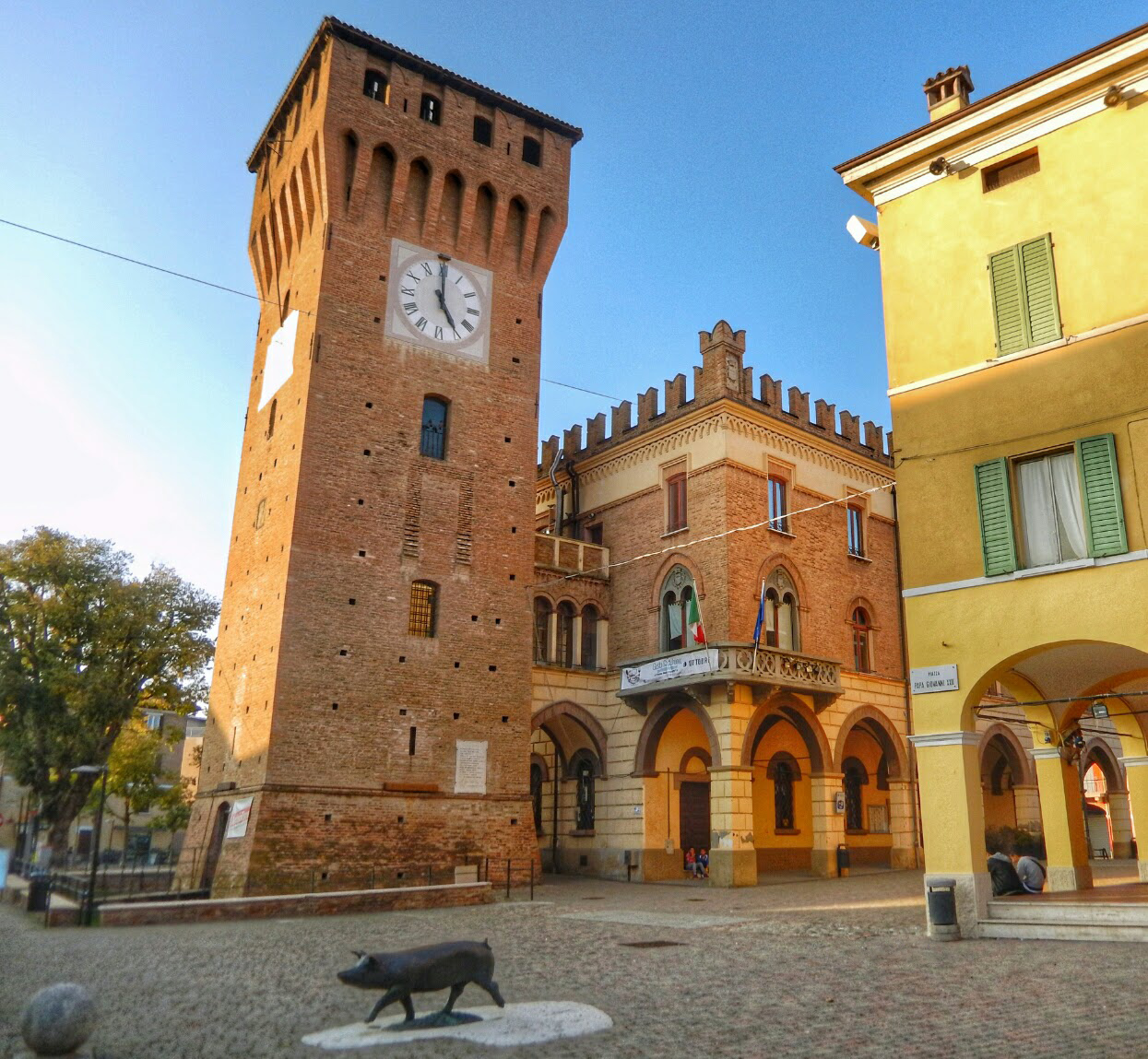

- Coat of arms

- Location within Italy Location within Emilia-Romagna
- Coordinates: 44°33′N 10°56′E
- Country: Italy
- Region: Emilia-Romagna
- Province: Modena (MO)
- Frazioni: Montale, Cavidole, San Lorenzo

Government
  - Mayor: Massimo Paradisi

Area
  - Total: 22.44 km^{2} (8.66 sq mi)
- Elevation: 76 m (249 ft)

Population (31 August 2017)
  - Total: 15,008
  - Density: 668.8/km^{2} (1,732/sq mi)
- Demonym: Castelnovesi
- Time zone: UTC+1 (CET)
  - Summer (DST): UTC+2 (CEST)
- Postal code: 41051
- Dialing code: 059
- Patron saint: Saint Celestine
- Saint day: 6 April
- Website: Official website

Castelnuovo Rangone (Modenese: Castelnôv) is a comune (municipality) in the Province of Modena in the Italian region Emilia-Romagna, located about 40 kilometres (25 mi) west of Bologna and about 13 kilometres (8 mi) south of Modena. The most important economic activity is the production and treatment of pork. Castelnuovo Rangone includes the following frazioni: Balugola, Cavidole, Montale Rangone, San Lorenzo, Settecani, Ca' Bergomi, Gualinga, Castello, Oratorio di Sant'Anna, Santa Lucia.

Luciano Pavarotti and his sister Gabriella are buried in the cemetery of Montale Rangone.

Castelnuovo Rangone borders the following municipalities: Castelvetro di Modena, Formigine, Modena, Spilamberto.

== Twin towns ==
Castelnuovo Rangone is twinned with:

- Suhr, Switzerland
- Auriol, France
