= Augusto Valli =

Italian painter

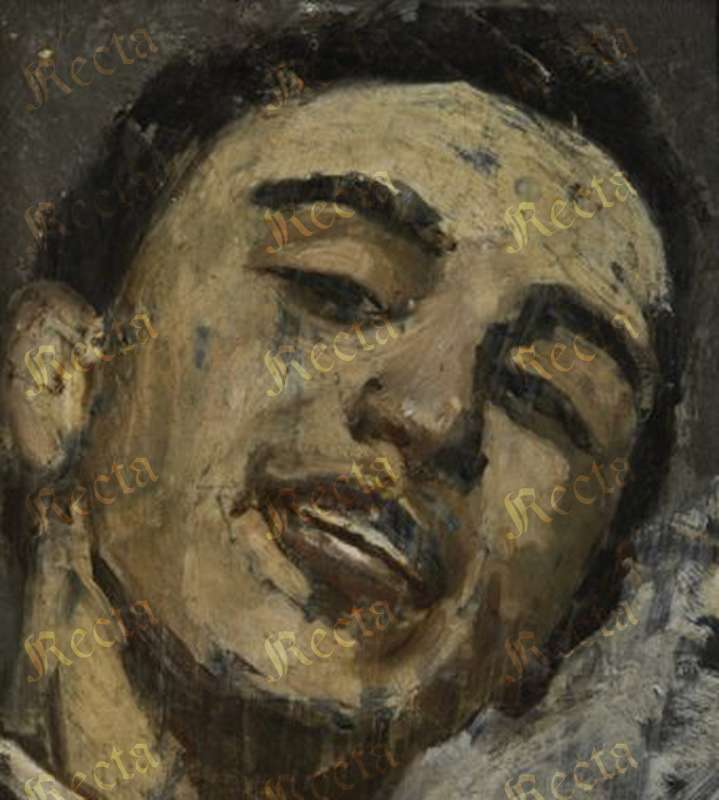
- Augusto Valli, portrait of the artist by unknown
- Born: 22 May 1867; Modena, Italy
- Died: 1945 (aged 77–78)
- Education: Royal Institute of Fine Arts, Modena
- Known for: Painter and illustrator
- Movement: Orientalist

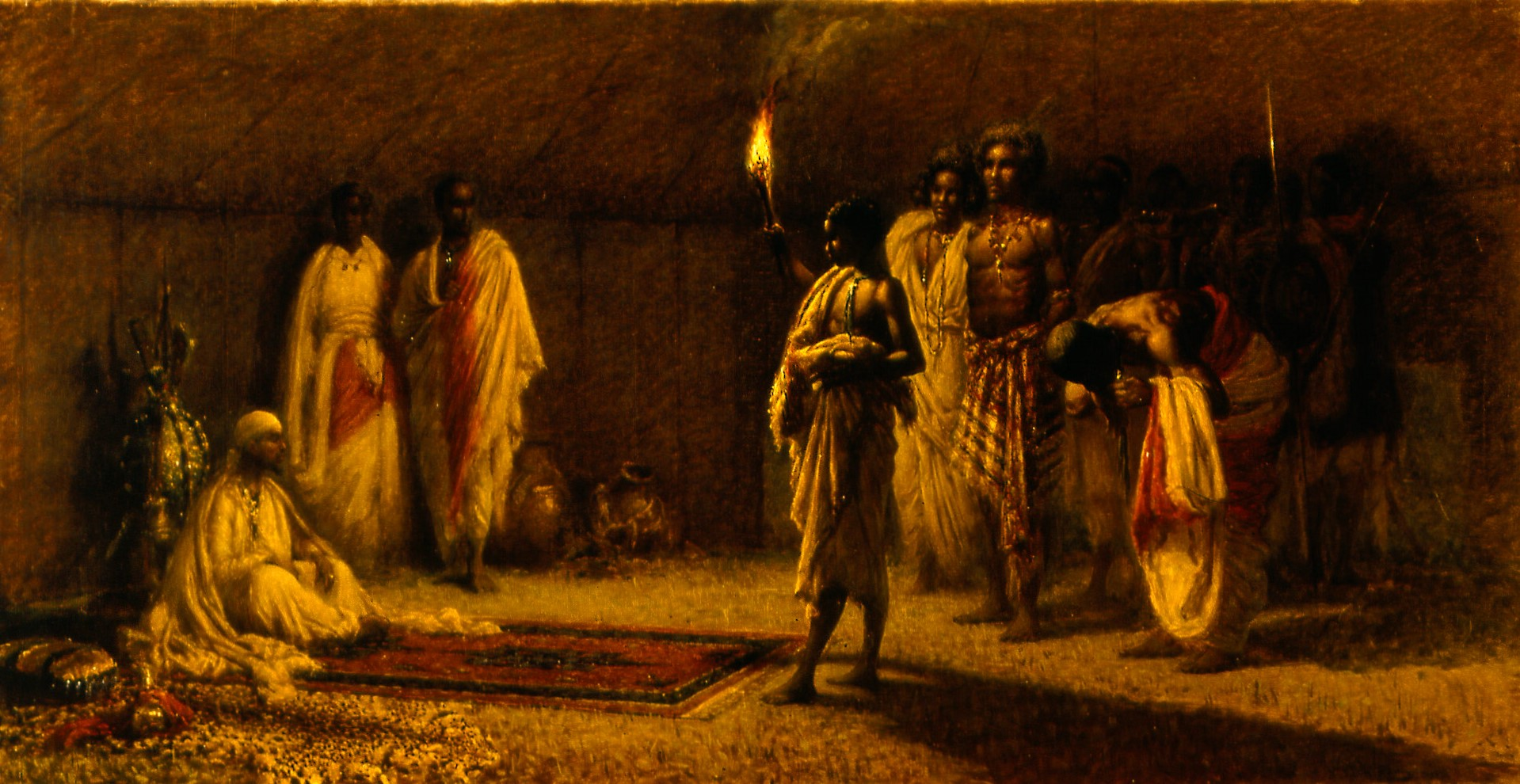
Due prigionieri Gallas tradotti davanti a Ras Makonen, oil on canvas, 1892

Augusto Valli (22 May 1867 – 1945) was an Italian painter, in a Realist style. His journeys to Africa influenced his choice of subject matter and he painted African themes with vibrant colours.

== Life and career ==
Augusto Valli was born in Modena on 22 May 1867 into a family of modest means. He enrolled in 1879 at the Royal Institute of Fine Arts in Modena under Antonio Simonazzi and Ferdinando Manzini completing his studies at the age of 18 years. There he attended the Corso Comune until 1881–1882 and the Corso Speciale of painting from 1882 to 1884.

In 1885, he travelled to Africa. In 1896, he was part of an expedition to Abyssinia and Ethiopia with the Count Gian Pietro. He was detained in Harar by the British Consulate. He escaped a massacre of the Italian mission by the rebels of the Emir Abdallah. In all, he returned three times to East Africa. His last journey was in 1890-91 where he served as a court painter at the Royal Court of Melenik of Ethiopia. He returned from these voyages with many folders of sketches, some of which were purchased by the Geographic Congress of Rome and are now in the museum of La Società Geografica Italiana.

He illustrated a book (1942) about African (Ethiopian) travels by the colonist Conte Augusto Salimbeni, where he was described as a pittore africanista. For years, he painted for the church of San Giovanni Battista, Spilamberto.

== Work ==
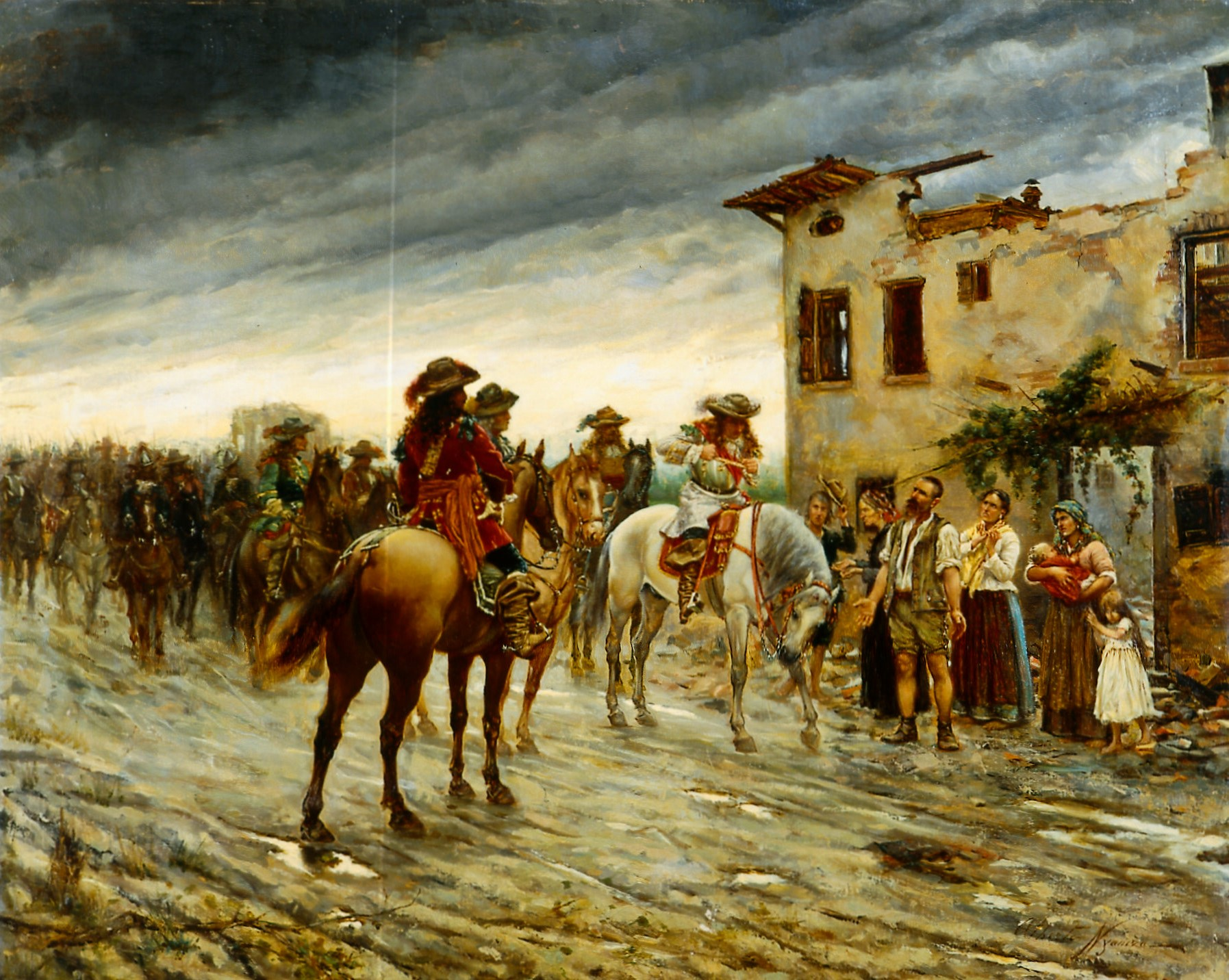
Vittorio Amedeo in mezzo alle popolazioni danneggiate dalla guerra distribuisce tutto il suo denaro e poi fa a pezzi il collare dell'Annunciata e lo spartisce, oil on canvas, 1888

Valli worked in watercolours and in oils. He also illustrated several books. His style was often impressionistic and with touches of colour.

=== Select list of works ===
- Semiramide Dying on Ninu's Grave, 1893
- Leggenda della morte di Semiramide
- Ritratto Di Donna Africana
- Ritratto Di Nubiana
- The Good Samaritan
- African Landscape

== See also ==
- List of Orientalist artists
- Orientalism
