= Stefano Antonio Morcelli =

Italian Jesuit scholar and epigraphist

- Gabriele Rottini, Portrait of Stefano Antonio Morcelli, 1830-39, Chiari, Biblioteca Morcelli

Personal life
- Born: Gianni Antonio Morcelli; January 17, 1737 Chiari, Duchy of Milan
- Died: January 1, 1822 (aged 84) Chiari, Duchy of Milan
- Parent(s): Francesco Morcelli and Giovanna Morcelli (née Della Rocca)
- Education: Roman College
- Occupation: Jesuit, epigraphist, librarian
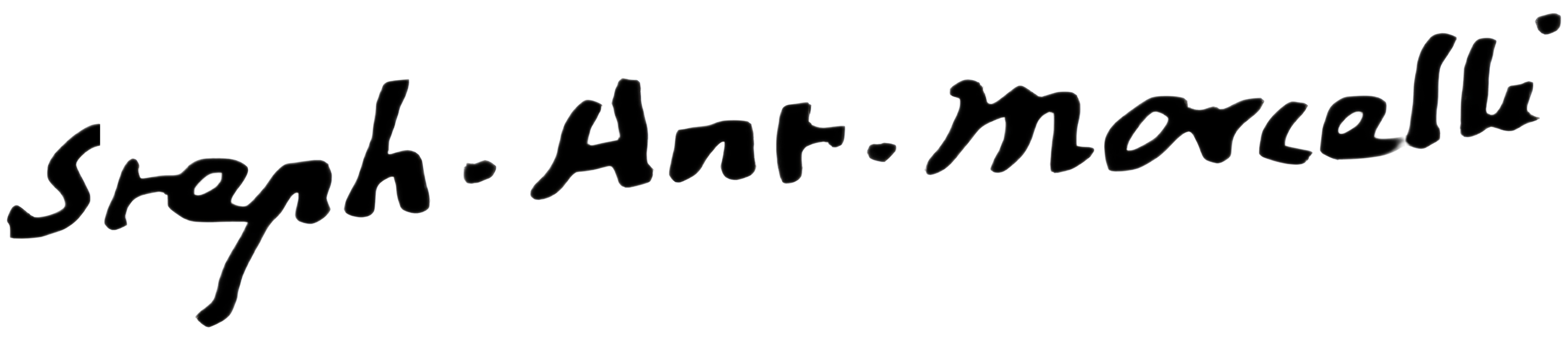
- Signature

Religious life
- Religion: Roman Catholicism
- Order: Society of Jesus
- Ordination: 3 November 1753

Stefano Antonio Morcelli (17 January 1737 – 1 January 1822) was an Italian Jesuit scholar, known as an epigraphist. His work De stilo Latinarum inscriptionum libri III, published in three volumes in 1781, which shows a rigorous method, a novelty and originality of approach, as well as a solid preparation, gave him his European fame and is considered a milestone in the development of epigraphy.

== Life ==
Morcelli was born at Chiari near Brescia. He studied at the Jesuit College of Brescia and was admitted into the Society of Jesus, 3 November 1753. He successively taught grammar at Fermo, humanities at Ragusa, and oratory at the Roman College where he established an academy of archaeology at the Kircherian Museum.

After the suppression of the Society of Jesus (1773), he became librarian to Cardinal Albani and in 1791, he was appointed to a provostship in his native town. He declined the offer of the Archbishopric of Ragusa and continued his literary labors in Rome. His first publication was De stilo inscriptionum latinarum (On the style of Latin inscriptions, 1780). In the town of Chiari, his birthplace, to which he afterwards withdrew, he founded an institution for the education of girls, reformed the entire school system, devoted his library to public use, and restored many buildings and churches.

Meantime his reputation as an epigraphist, numismatist, and archaeologist increased. Besides his numerous works on this subjects, he published five volumes of sermons and ascetic treatises. When the Society of Jesus was re-established in 1814, he again took his place in its ranks, and died in Chiari in January 1822, aged eighty-four.

== Works ==
Morcelli owes his reputation not only to his extensive knowledge of ancient inscriptions, but also to his classical Latinity. Among his works are:

- De stilo inscriptionum latinarum (Rome, 1781);
- Inscriptiones commentariis subjectis (Rome, 1783)
- To a second edition of these two works was added the Πάρεργον Inscriptionum novissimarum (Padua, 1818–22);
- Μηνολόγιον τῶν Εὐαγγελίων Ἑορταστικὸν sive Kalendarium Ecclesiæ Constantinopolitanæ etc. (Rome, 1788);
- Africa Christiana (Brescia, 1816-7);
- Opuscoli Ascetici (Brescia, 1819 or 1820).

Morcelli was also an important numismatist, and was influential on such scholars as Celestino Cavedoni.

== Bibliography ==
- Moroni, Gaetano (1840). Dizionario di erudizione storico-ecclesiastica. Vol. XLVI. Venice: Tipografia Emiliana. p. 292.
- Carlos Sommervogel, Bibliothèque de la Compagnie de Jésus, V, 1290-1305 (Paris, 1894).
- Jaubert, Henri (1914). Stéphane-Antoine Morcelli (in French). Constantine: impr. D. Braham.
- Rivetti, Luigi (1920). Stefano Antonio Morcelli: note biografiche 1737-1821. Brescia: Geroldi.
- Cenini, Luisa (1975). Stefano Antonio Morcelli: 1737-1821. La vita e l’opera. Brescia: Morcelliana.
- Facchetti, Mino (1987). Il Morcelli e Chiari fra ’700 e ’800. Chiari: GAM Editrice.
- "Stefano Antonio Morcelli. Un gesuita tra Ancien Régime ed Età Contemporanea". Biblioteca Clarense. Quaderni della Fondazione Biblioteca Morcelli Pinacoteca Repossi. Chiari: Nordpress Edizioni. 2001.
- Mazzoleni, Danilo (2012). "MORCELLI, Stefano Antonio". Dizionario Biografico degli Italiani (in Italian). Vol. 76: Montauti–Morlaiter. Rome: Institute of the Italian Encyclopaedia. ISBN 978-88-12-00032-6.
