= Celestino Cavedoni =

Italian ecclesiastic, archeologist and numismatist

Reverend Celestino Cavedoni
- Venanzio Celestino Cavedoni
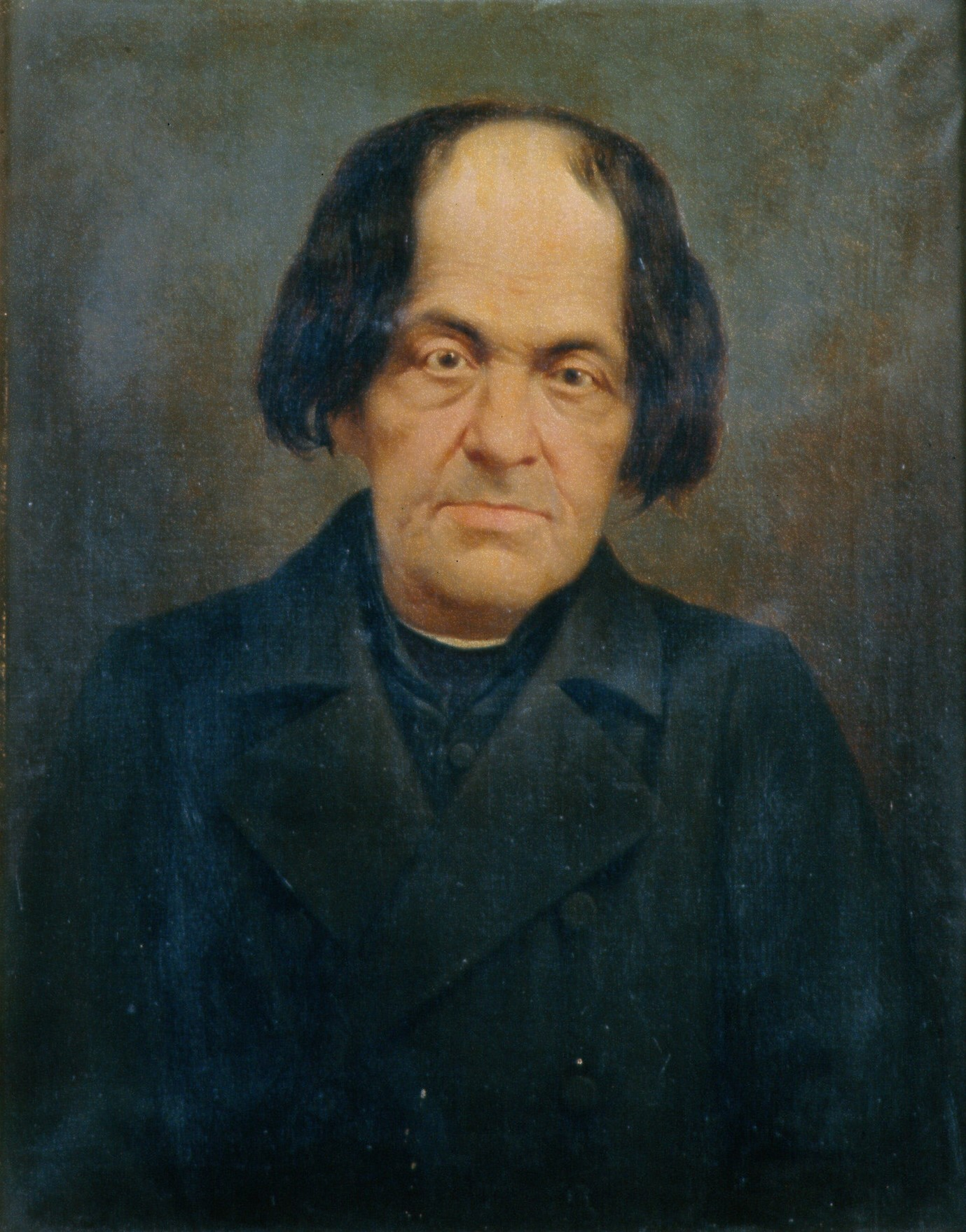
- Giulio Muratori, Portrait of Celestino Cavedoni. Modena, Museo Civico
- Born: May 18, 1795; Castelvetro di Modena, Duchy of Modena and Reggio
- Died: 26 November 1865 (aged 70); Modena, Kingdom of Italy
- Occupations: Catholic priest, archeologist, and numismatist
- Parent(s): Giorgio Giuseppe Alaria Cavedoni and Cristina Cavedoni (née Franchini)
- Awards: Prix de Numismatique Allier de Hauteroche (1851); Legion of Honour

Academic background
- Education: University of Bologna
- Academic advisor: Giuseppe Caspar Mezzofanti
- Influences: Bartolomeo Borghesi; Stefano Antonio Morcelli

Academic work
- Discipline: Archaeology, Numismatics, Epigraphy, Ancient Near Eastern languages, Romance studies
- Sub-discipline: Classical archaeology, Biblical archaeology
- Institutions: Biblioteca Estense; University of Modena and Reggio Emilia

Celestino Cavedoni (18 May 1795 at Levizzano Rangone, near Modena – 26 November 1865 in Modena) was an Italian Catholic priest, archeologist, and numismatist.

== Biography ==
Celestino Cavedoni was born at Levizzano-Rangone, near Modena, on 18 May 1795. He pursued his theological studies in the diocesan seminary, and from 1816 to 1821 distinguished himself in the study of archeologist and the Greek and Hebrew languages at the University of Bologna. He was then appointed custodian of the Numismatical Museum of Modena, and accepted a position in the City Library, of which he became librarian in 1847. From 1830 to 1863 he held the chair of hermeneutics at the University of Modena.

== Works ==
Cavedoni was a corresponding member of the commission created by Napoleon III to edit the works of Count Bartolomeo Borghesi, to which collection he contributed numerous scientific notes.

Cavedoni's numismatic works include:

- Saggio di osservazioni sulle medaglie di famiglie romane (1829)
- Carellii nummorum Italiæ Veteris tabulæ (Leipzig, 1850)
- Numismatica Biblica (Modena, 1850; German tr. by Werlhof, Hanover, 1855–56)

Cavedoni contributed numerous historical and archæological papers to the Annali and the Bullettino of the Archæological Institute of Rome and to other Italian publications. In religious polemics he wrote a critique of Ernest Renan's Life of Jesus, Confutazione dei principali errori di Ernesto Renan nella sua Vie de Jésus (Modena, 1863), which passed through four editions in several months.
