= San Possidonio =

- Comune
- Comune di San Possidonio
- Coat of arms

- Location within Italy Location within Emilia-Romagna
- Coordinates: 44°53′N 11°2′E
- Country: Italy
- Region: Emilia-Romagna
- Province: Modena (MO)

Government
  - Mayor: Veronica Morselli

Area
  - Total: 17.06 km^{2} (6.59 sq mi)
- Elevation: 20 m (66 ft)

Population (31 July 2015)
  - Total: 3,566
  - Density: 209.0/km^{2} (541.4/sq mi)
- Demonym: Possidiesi
- Time zone: UTC+1 (CET)
  - Summer (DST): UTC+2 (CEST)
- Postal code: 41039
- Dialing code: 0535
- Website: Official website

San Possidonio (Mirandolese: San Pusidònî) is a comune (municipality) in the Province of Modena in the Italian region Emilia-Romagna, located about 50 kilometres (31 mi) northwest of Bologna and about 35 kilometres (22 mi) northeast of Modena.

San Possidonio borders the following municipalities: Cavezzo, Concordia sulla Secchia, Mirandola, Novi di Modena.

== Twin towns ==
San Possidonio is twinned with:

- Vinay, Isère, France, since 2013
