= Medolla =

- Comune
- Comune di Medolla
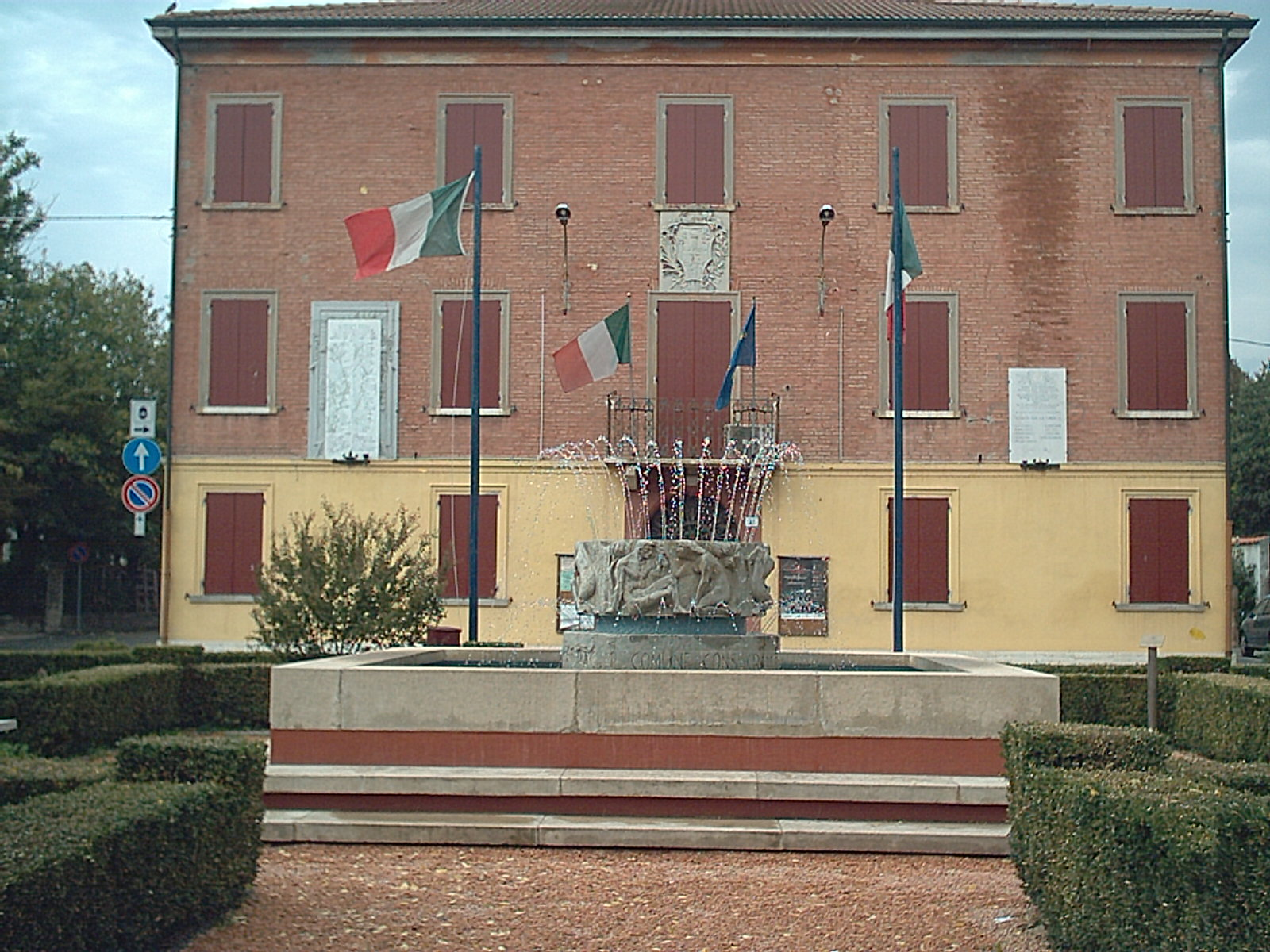
- Town hall.

- Location within Italy Location within Emilia-Romagna
- Coordinates: 44°51′N 11°4′E
- Country: Italy
- Region: Emilia-Romagna
- Province: Modena (MO)
- Frazioni: Villafranca, Camurana

Government
  - Mayor: Alberto Calciolari

Area
  - Total: 28 km^{2} (11 sq mi)
- Elevation: 22 m (72 ft)

Population (31 October 2017)
  - Total: 6,288
  - Density: 220/km^{2} (580/sq mi)
- Demonym: Medollesi
- Time zone: UTC+1 (CET)
  - Summer (DST): UTC+2 (CEST)
- Postal code: 41036
- Dialing code: 0535
- Website: Official website

Medolla (Mirandolese: Mdòla) is a comune (municipality) in the Province of Modena in the Italian region Emilia-Romagna, located about 45 kilometres (28 mi) northwest of Bologna and about 25 kilometres (16 mi) northeast of Modena.

Medolla borders the following municipalities: Bomporto, Camposanto, Cavezzo, Mirandola, San Felice sul Panaro, San Prospero.
