= Ravarino =

- Comune
- Comune di Ravarino
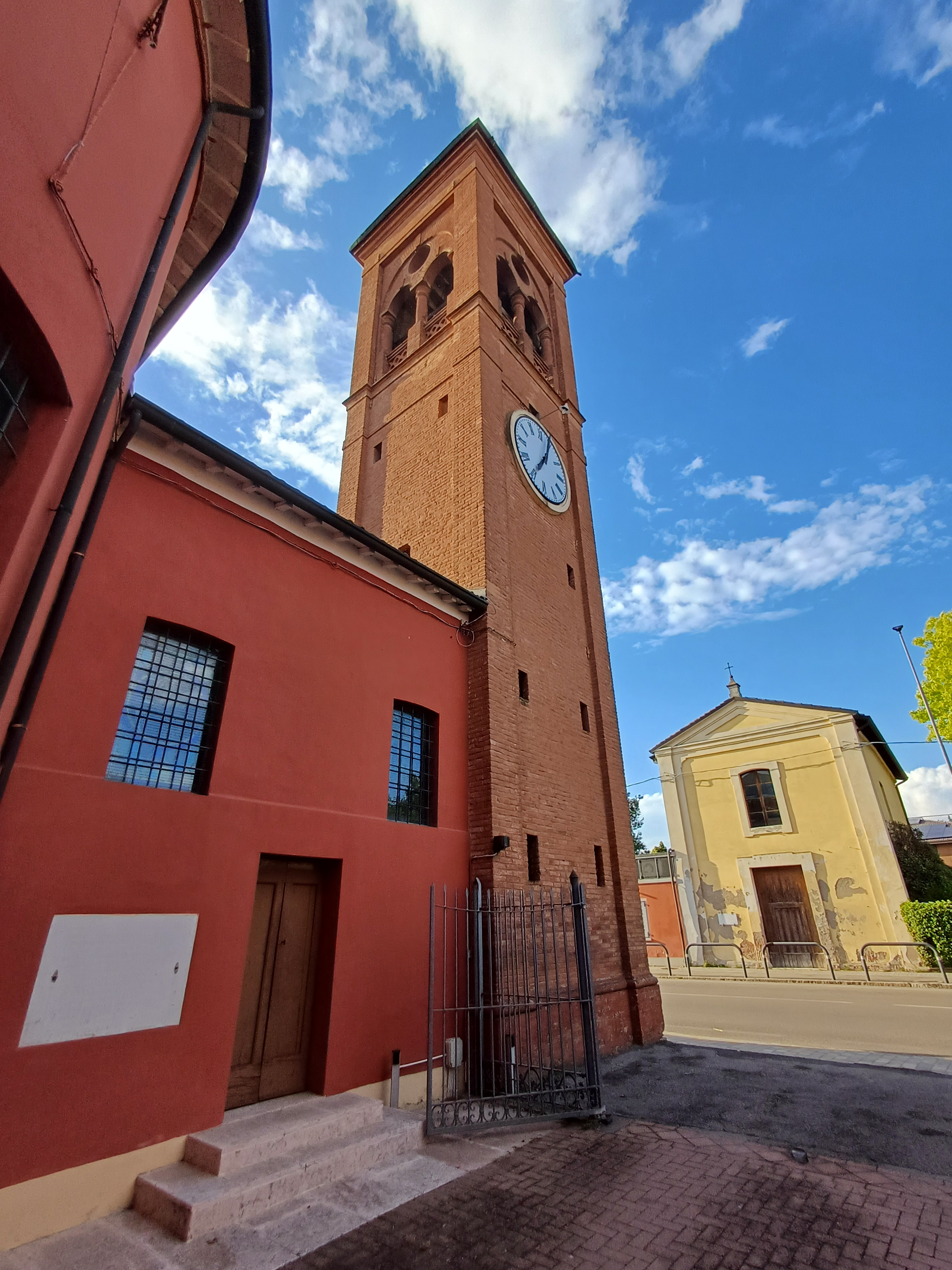

- Location within Italy Location within Emilia-Romagna
- Coordinates: 44°43′N 11°6′E
- Country: Italy
- Region: Emilia-Romagna
- Province: Modena (MO)
- Frazioni: Casoni, La Villa, Rami, Stuffione, San Claudio

Government
  - Mayor: Maurizia Rebecchi

Area
  - Total: 28.53 km^{2} (11.02 sq mi)
- Elevation: 23 m (75 ft)

Population (31 July 2015)
  - Total: 6,318
  - Density: 221.5/km^{2} (573.6/sq mi)
- Demonym: Ravarinesi
- Time zone: UTC+1 (CET)
  - Summer (DST): UTC+2 (CEST)
- Postal code: 41017
- Dialing code: 059
- Website: Official website

Ravarino (Modenese: Ravarèin) is a comune (municipality) in the province of Modena, in the Italian region of Emilia-Romagna, located about 30 kilometres (19 mi) northwest of Bologna and about 15 kilometres (9 mi) northeast of Modena.

Ravarino borders the following municipalities: Bomporto, Camposanto, Crevalcore, Nonantola.
