= Concordia sulla Secchia =

- Comune
- Comune di Concordia sulla Secchia
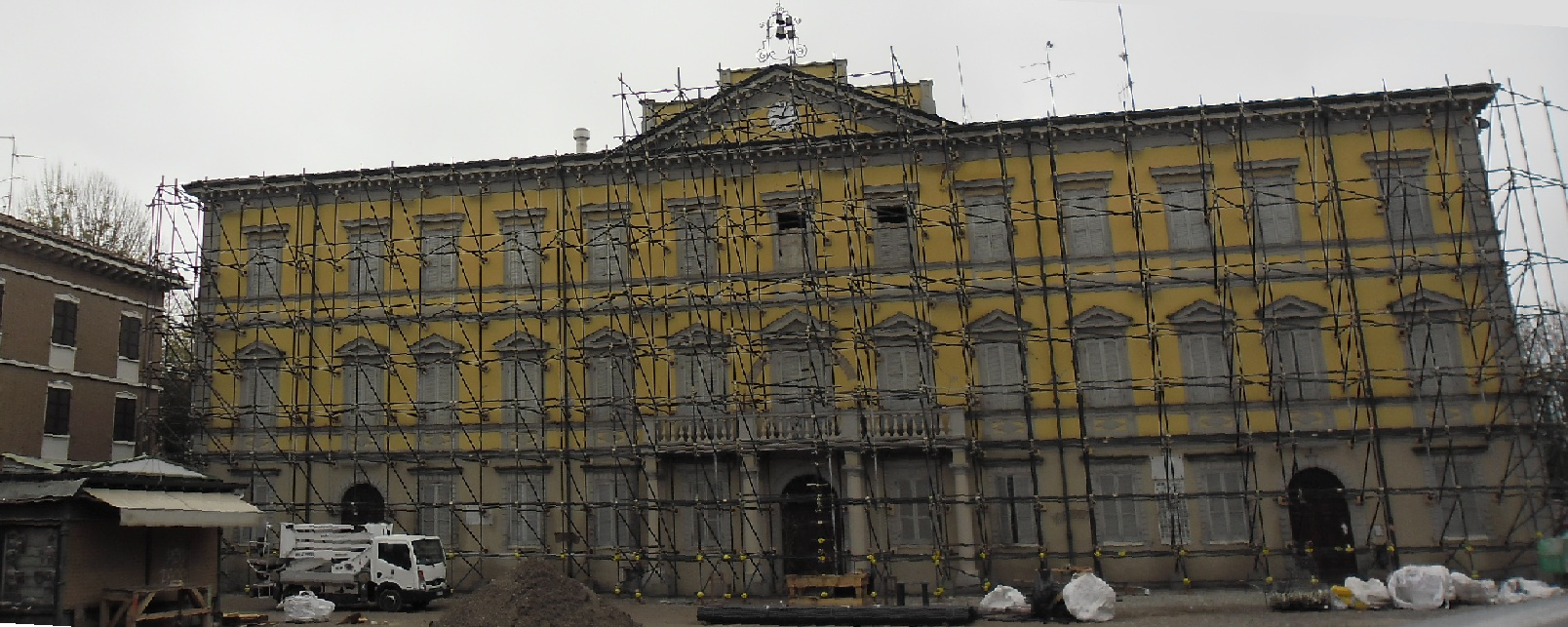
- The town hall after the 2012 earthquake.

- Coat of arms

- Location within Italy Location within Emilia-Romagna
- Coordinates: 44°55′N 10°59′E
- Country: Italy
- Region: Emilia-Romagna
- Province: Modena (MO)
- Frazioni: Fossa, San Giovanni, Santa Caterina, Vallalta

Government
  - Mayor: Marika Menozzi

Area
  - Total: 40.97 km^{2} (15.82 sq mi)
- Elevation: 22 m (72 ft)

Population (30 June 2017)
  - Total: 8,435
  - Density: 205.9/km^{2} (533.2/sq mi)
- Demonym: Concordiesi
- Time zone: UTC+1 (CET)
  - Summer (DST): UTC+2 (CEST)
- Postal code: 41033
- Dialing code: 0535
- Website: Official website

Concordia sulla Secchia (Concordiese: Cuncordia) is a comune (municipality) in the Province of Modena in the Italian region Emilia-Romagna, located about 50 kilometres (31 mi) northwest of Bologna and about 30 kilometres (19 mi) north of Modena.

Concordia sulla Secchia borders the following municipalities: Mirandola, Moglia, Novi di Modena, Quistello, San Giacomo delle Segnate, San Giovanni del Dosso, San Possidonio.

== History ==
Concordia was part of the fiefs of the Pico della Mirandola family starting from 1311, when Francesco I Pico had a mill built here near the Secchia river. In 1704 the town was besieged and set to fire by French troops in the course of the War of Spanish Succession.

In 1711, the duke of Modena (House of Este) acquired the states of the Pico della Mirandola, including, among others, the duchy of Mirandola, the marquisate of La Concordia and the lordship of San Martino in Spino.

Concordia has been heavily damaged by an earthquake on 29 May 2012. The event has partially destroyed the church, the town hall and all the historical buildings in the town center.
