= Polinago =

- Comune
- Comune di Polinago
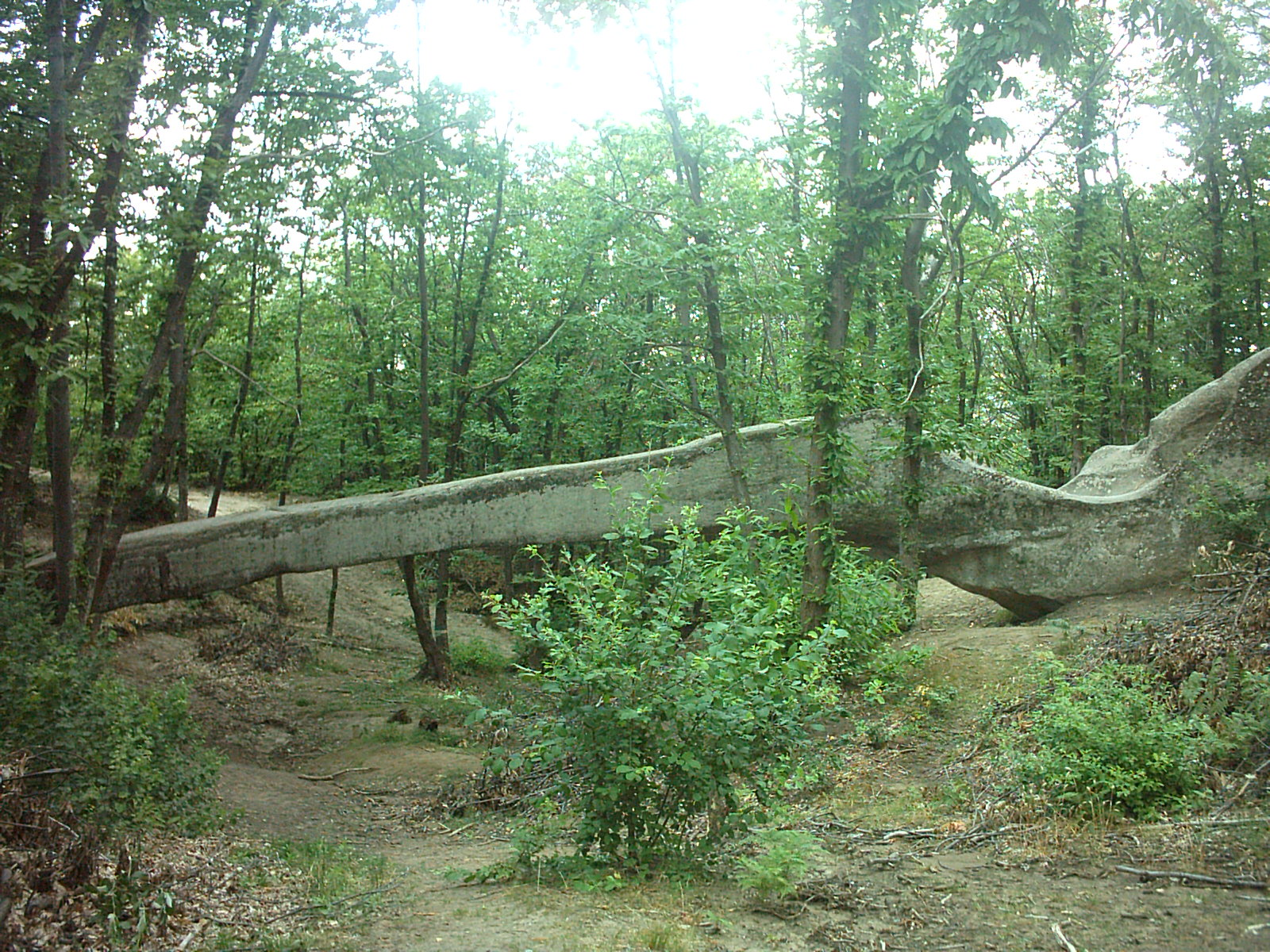
- Ponte del diavolo (Devil's bridge) or ponte Ercole (Hercules' bridge): a bizarre natural monolith shaped as a bridge in the territory of Polinago.

- Coat of arms

- Location within Italy Location within Emilia-Romagna
- Coordinates: 44°21′N 10°43′E
- Country: Italy
- Region: Emilia-Romagna
- Province: Modena (MO)
- Frazioni: Brandola, Cassano, Gombola, San Martino, Talbignano

Government
  - Mayor: Simona Magnani

Area
  - Total: 53.8 km^{2} (20.8 sq mi)
- Elevation: 810 m (2,660 ft)

Population (2007)
  - Total: 1,807
  - Density: 33.6/km^{2} (87.0/sq mi)
- Demonym: Polinaghèsi
- Time zone: UTC+1 (CET)
  - Summer (DST): UTC+2 (CEST)
- Postal code: 41040
- Dialing code: 0536
- Website: Official website

Polinago (Frignanese: Pulinêg) is a comune (municipality) in the Province of Modena in the Italian region Emilia-Romagna, located about 50 kilometres (31 mi) southwest of Bologna and about 40 kilometres (25 mi) southwest of Modena.

== See also ==
- Santa Maria Assunta
