= Bastiglia =

- Comune
- Comune di Bastiglia
- Location within Italy Location within Emilia-Romagna
- Coordinates: 44°44′N 11°0′E
- Country: Italy
- Region: Emilia-Romagna
- Province: Modena (MO)
- Frazioni: San Clemente

Government
  - Mayor: Francesca Silvestri

Area
  - Total: 10.47 km^{2} (4.04 sq mi)
- Elevation: 27 m (89 ft)

Population (31 March 2017)
  - Total: 4,217
  - Density: 402.8/km^{2} (1,043/sq mi)
- Demonym: Bastigliesi
- Time zone: UTC+1 (CET)
  - Summer (DST): UTC+2 (CEST)
- Postal code: 41030
- Dialing code: 059
- Patron saint: Assumption of Mary
- Saint day: 15 August
- Website: Official website

Bastiglia (Modenese: Bastîa) is a comune (municipality) in the Province of Modena in the Italian region Emilia-Romagna, located about 40 kilometres (25 mi) northwest of Bologna and about 11 kilometres (7 mi) northeast of Modena.

Bastiglia borders the following municipalities: Bomporto, Modena, and Soliera.
