= Spilamberto =

- Comune
- Comune di Spilamberto
- Coat of arms

- Location within Italy Location within Emilia-Romagna
- Coordinates: 44°32′N 11°1′E
- Country: Italy
- Region: Emilia-Romagna
- Province: Modena (MO)
- Frazioni: San Vito

Government
  - Mayor: Massimo Glielmi

Area
  - Total: 29.5 km^{2} (11.4 sq mi)
- Elevation: 70 m (230 ft)

Population (31 July 2015)
  - Total: 12,575
  - Density: 426/km^{2} (1,100/sq mi)
- Demonym: Spilambertesi
- Time zone: UTC+1 (CET)
  - Summer (DST): UTC+2 (CEST)
- Postal code: 41057
- Dialing code: 059
- Patron saint: St. John the Baptist, St. Hadrian III
- Saint day: June 24, July 8
- Website: Official website

Spilamberto (Modenese: Spilambêrt; Western Bolognese: Spilanbêrt) is a comune (municipality) in the Province of Modena in the Italian region Emilia-Romagna, located about 25 kilometres (16 mi) west of Bologna and about 10 kilometres (6 mi) southeast of Modena.

Famous in June is the Fiera di San Giovanni, attracting a lot of people in the town. Spilamberto is a renowned center of production of balsamic vinegar and other typical products of the region. Also famous for Giovanni Cavani luthier whose musical instruments are famous all over the world.

== Religious buildings ==
Among the churches within the town limits are:

- Chiesa della Beata Vergine
- Chiesa delle Monache Cappuccine Scalze
- San Giovanni Battista
- Sant'Adriano III Papa
- Santa Maria degli Angioli
- San Vito Martire
- Oratorio della Santissima Annunziata di Collecchio
- Oratorio di S. Liberata
