= Novi di Modena =

- Comune
- Comune di Novi di Modena
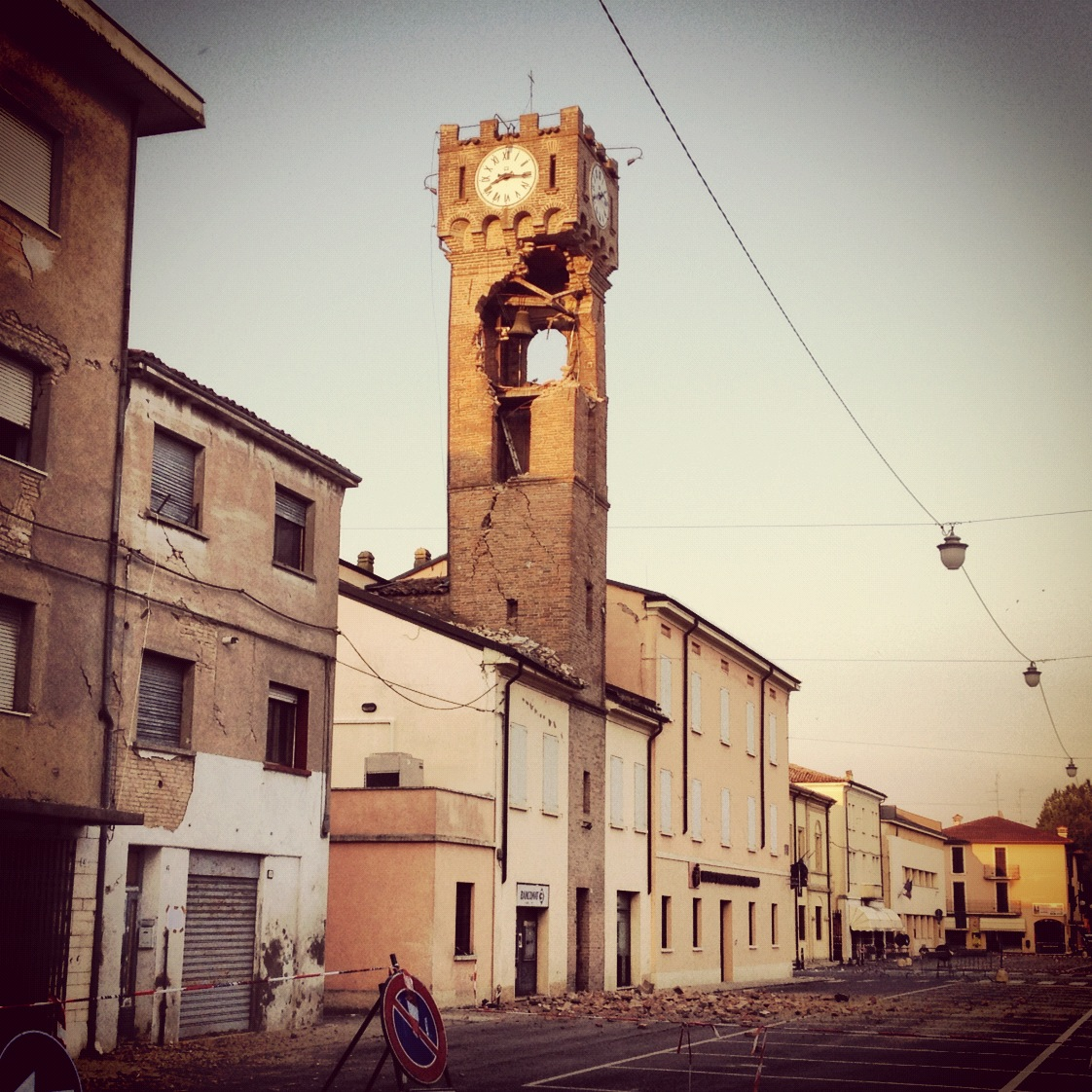
- Damage in the town after the 2012 earthquake

- Coat of arms

- Location within Italy Location within Emilia-Romagna
- Coordinates: 44°53′N 10°54′E
- Country: Italy
- Region: Emilia-Romagna
- Province: Modena (MO)
- Frazioni: Rovereto sulla Secchia, Sant'Antonio in Mercadello

Government
  - Mayor: Enrico Diacci

Area
  - Total: 51.82 km^{2} (20.01 sq mi)
- Elevation: 21 m (69 ft)

Population (30 October 2017)
  - Total: 10,103
  - Density: 195.0/km^{2} (505.0/sq mi)
- Demonym: Novesi
- Time zone: UTC+1 (CET)
  - Summer (DST): UTC+2 (CEST)
- Postal code: 41016
- Dialing code: 059
- Patron saint: St. Michael Archangel
- Saint day: September 29
- Website: Official website

Novi di Modena (Novese: Nóv) is a comune (municipality) in the Province of Modena in the Italian region Emilia-Romagna, located about 60 kilometres (37 mi) northwest of Bologna and about 25 kilometres (16 mi) north of Modena in the Pianura Padana.
