= Province of Modena =

Province of Italy

Province of Modena Provincia di Modena (Italian)
- Province
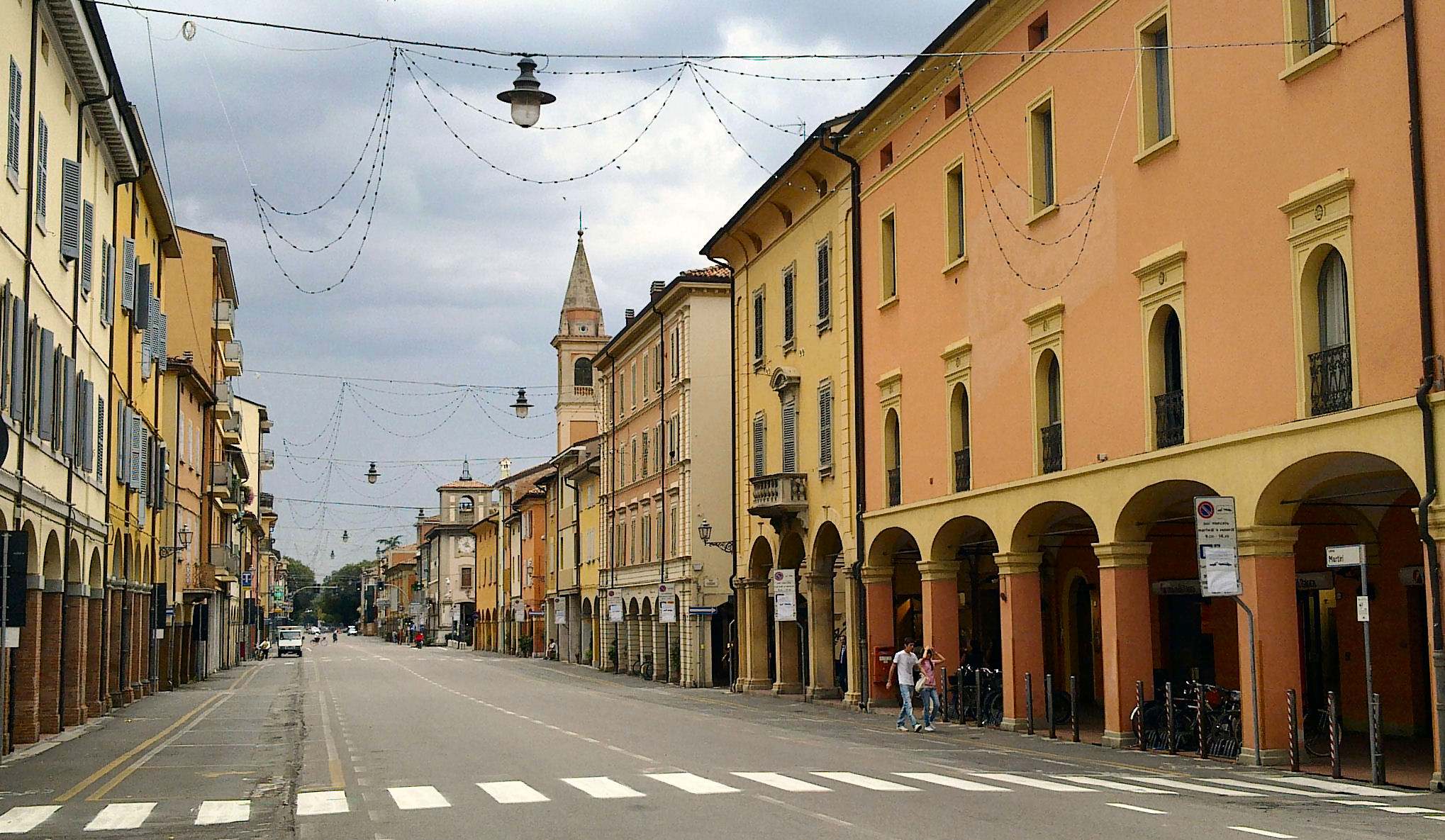
- The Via Emilia in Castelfranco Emilia

- Flag Coat of arms

- Location of the province of Modena in Italy
- Coordinates: 44.644722°N 10.925556°E
- Country: Italy
- Region: Emilia-Romagna
- Capital(s): Modena
- Municipalities: 47

Government
  - President: Fabio Braglia

Area
  - Total: 2,688.02 km^{2} (1,037.85 sq mi)

Population (2026)
  - Total: 711,502
  - Density: 264.694/km^{2} (685.554/sq mi)

GDP
  - Total: €25.296 billion (2015)
  - Per capita: €36,034 (2015)
- Time zone: UTC+1 (CET)
  - Summer (DST): UTC+2 (CEST)
- Postal code: 41000-41100
- Telephone prefix: 059, 0535, 0536
- ISO 3166 code: IT-MO
- Vehicle registration: MO
- ISTAT: 036

Coat of arms before 2006

The province of Modena (Italian: provincia di Modena) is a province in the region of Emilia-Romagna in Italy. Its capital is the city of Modena. It has a population of 711,502 in an area of 2,688.02 square kilometres (1,037.85 sq mi) across its 47 municipalities.

== Municipalities ==
The province has 47 municipalities:

- Bastiglia
- Bomporto
- Campogalliano
- Camposanto
- Carpi
- Castelfranco Emilia
- Castelnuovo Rangone
- Castelvetro di Modena
- Cavezzo
- Concordia sulla Secchia
- Fanano
- Finale Emilia
- Fiorano Modenese
- Fiumalbo
- Formigine
- Frassinoro
- Guiglia
- Lama Mocogno
- Maranello
- Marano sul Panaro
- Medolla
- Mirandola
- Modena
- Montecreto
- Montefiorino
- Montese
- Nonantola
- Novi di Modena
- Palagano
- Pavullo nel Frignano
- Pievepelago
- Polinago
- Prignano sulla Secchia
- Ravarino
- Riolunato
- San Cesario sul Panaro
- San Felice sul Panaro
- San Possidonio
- San Prospero
- Sassuolo
- Savignano sul Panaro
- Serramazzoni
- Sestola
- Soliera
- Spilamberto
- Vignola
- Zocca

== Demographics ==
As of 2026, the population is 711,502, of which 49.6% are male, and 50.4% are female. Minors make up 15.1% of the population, and seniors make up 24.2%.

Historical population

Year	Pop.	±%
1861	278,158	—
1871	298,532	+7.3%
1881	301,500	+1.0%
1901	336,875	+11.7%
1911	380,678	+13.0%
1921	421,670	+10.8%
1931	456,997	+8.4%
1936	467,355	+2.3%

Year	Pop.	±%
1951	498,146	+6.6%
1961	511,355	+2.7%
1971	553,852	+8.3%
1981	596,025	+7.6%
1991	604,680	+1.5%
2001	633,993	+4.8%
2011	685,777	+8.2%
2021	701,751	+2.3%

Source: ISTAT

=== Immigration ===
As of 2025, immigrants make up 16.5% of the total population. The 5 largest foreign countries of birth are Morocco, Albania, Romania, Moldova, and Tunisia.

== Economy ==
Modena is one of the most important industrial areas in Europe. It is widely considered as the capital of the supercar and sports car industry, lodging the Ferrari, Maserati, De Tomaso and Pagani car manufacturers and related industries such as Motovario, is home to international food industries like Grandi Salumifici, Cremonini Group, Fini Group, and several pottery manufacturers, textile firms, and pharmaceutical companies.
