= San Felice sul Panaro =

- Comune
- Comune di San Felice sul Panaro
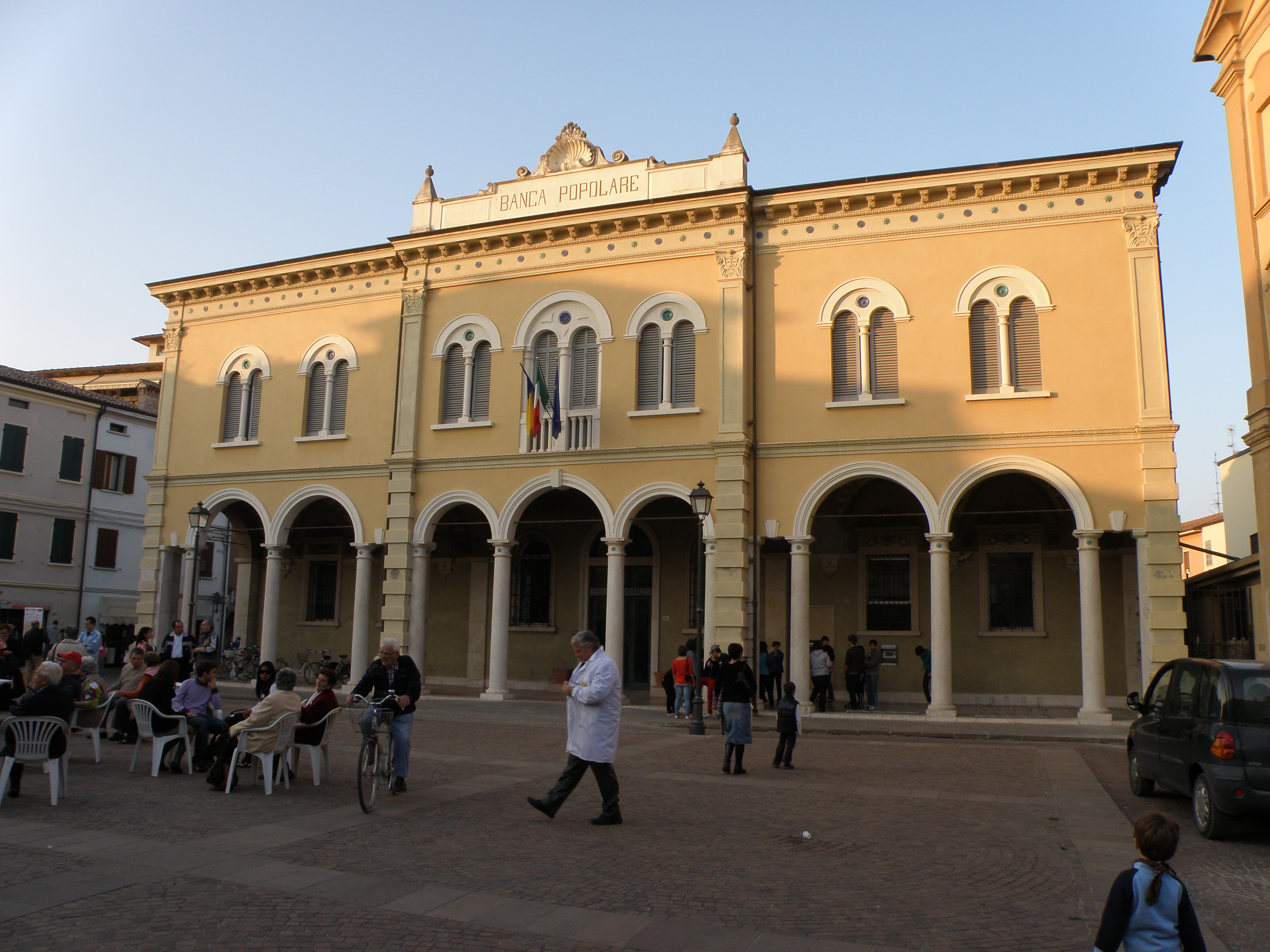

- Location within Italy Location within Emilia-Romagna
- Coordinates: 44°50′N 11°8′E
- Country: Italy
- Region: Emilia-Romagna
- Province: Modena (MO)
- Frazioni: Dogaro, Pavignane, Rivara, San Biagio in Padule

Government
  - Mayor: Michele Goldoni

Area
  - Total: 51.5 km^{2} (19.9 sq mi)
- Elevation: 19 m (62 ft)

Population (31 July 2015)
  - Total: 10,881
  - Density: 211/km^{2} (547/sq mi)
- Demonym: Sanfeliciani
- Time zone: UTC+1 (CET)
  - Summer (DST): UTC+2 (CEST)
- Postal code: 41038
- Dialing code: 0535
- Website: Official website

San Felice sul Panaro (Sanfeliciano: San Flîs) is a comune (municipality) in the province of Modena in the Italian region Emilia-Romagna, located about 40 kilometres (25 mi) northwest of Bologna and about 25 kilometres (16 mi) northeast of Modena.

San Felice sul Panaro since Roman times has been an important center of the central Po valley in northern Italy. The main activity was farming until the development of agriculture related industries during the 20th century.

== 2012 earthquakes ==
The region was struck by a two earthquakes in May 2012. The first earthquake, with a magnitude of 6.0, occurred on May 20, 2012. Although no residents of San Felice sul Panaro were reported to have died, the town's Rocca Estense castle was severely damaged by the quake.

A 5.8 magnitude earthquake struck the region On May 29, 2012, killing at least 17 people and collapsing churches and factories. About 200 people were injured 14,000 people were left homeless. At least three of the deaths occurred in San Felice sul Panaro when the roof of a machine shop collapsed on workers.
