= San Prospero =

- Comune
- Comune di San Prospero
- Location within Italy Location within Emilia-Romagna
- Coordinates: 44°47′N 11°1′E
- Country: Italy
- Region: Emilia-Romagna
- Province: Modena (MO)
- Frazioni: San Martino sul Secchia, San Lorenzo della Pioppa, San Pietro in Elda, Staggia

Government
  - Mayor: Sauro Borghi

Area
  - Total: 34.56 km^{2} (13.34 sq mi)
- Elevation: 22 m (72 ft)

Population (31 July 2015)
  - Total: 5,840
  - Density: 169/km^{2} (438/sq mi)
- Demonym: Sanprosperesi
- Time zone: UTC+1 (CET)
  - Summer (DST): UTC+2 (CEST)
- Postal code: 41030
- Dialing code: 059
- Patron saint: St. Prosper
- Saint day: 7 April
- Website: Official website

San Prospero (Carpigiano: San Prôsper) is a comune (municipality) in the Province of Modena in the Italian region Emilia-Romagna, located about 40 kilometres (25 mi) northwest of Bologna and about 15 kilometres (9 mi) northeast of Modena.
