= Synagogue of Sermide =

Synagogue in Sermide

Religion
- Affiliation: Judaism

Location
- Location: 3 Via Contrada degli Ebrei, Sermide, Italy
- Interactive map of Synagogue of Sermide
- Coordinates: 45°00′22″N 11°17′54″E

Architecture
- Completed: 1598

The Synagogue of Sermide (Italian: Sinagoga di Sermide) is a former synagogue located in Sermide e Felonica, Italy.

== History ==
The synagogue was built in 1598, and served as the place of worship for the town's Jewish community for over three centuries. Due to a loss of the town's Jews by the early 20th century, the synagogue became inactive by 1936. The furnishings were transferred to the Central Synagogue of Milan. They are currently located in a small oratory in its basement. The large Torah ark, a gift from the Jewish community of Mantua given in 1635 (constructed in 1543), was brought to Israel and is exhibited in Jerusalem at the Uri Nahon Museum of Jewish-Italian Art. It contains two side columns surmounted by two pots with large curved handles and a tympanum.

The building was damaged during bombing during WWII and was later turned into a private home with traces of the old rooms still preserved, such as the women's section. In 2006, a committee was set up in the commune for the recovery of the former synagogue. The 2012 Northern Italy earthquakes damaged the structural integrity of the building. The following year, wooden external supports were added to prevent further damage, with the total estimated repair cost to the building being €235,900.

== See also ==
- List of synagogues in Italy
