= Bondeno =

- Comune
- Comune di Bondeno
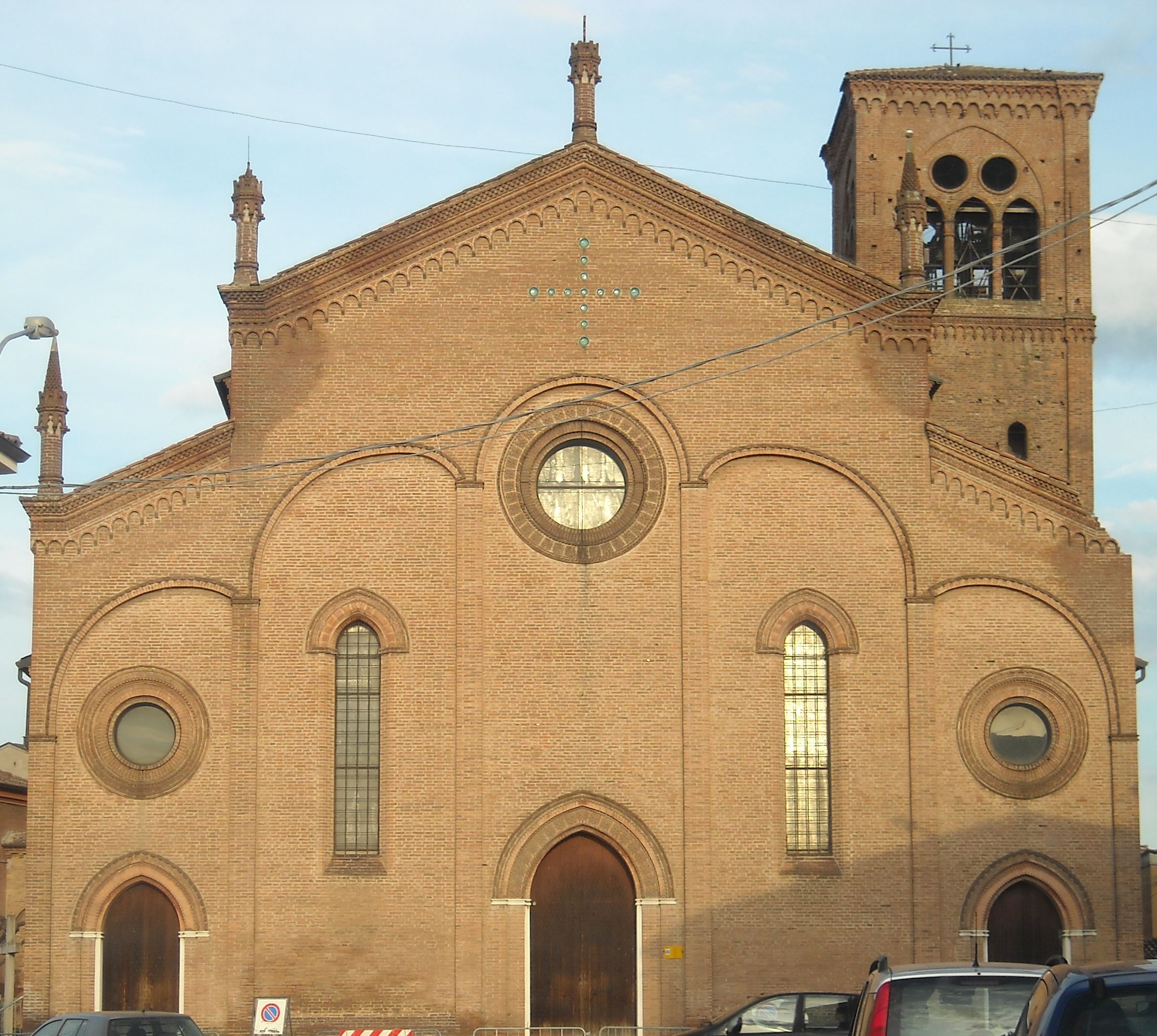
- Church in Bondeno

- Flag Coat of arms

- Location within Italy Location within Emilia-Romagna
- Coordinates: 44°53′N 11°25′E
- Country: Italy
- Region: Emilia-Romagna
- Province: Ferrara (FE)
- Frazioni: Scortichino, Gavello, Pilastri, Burana, Stellata, Zerbinate, Salvatonica, Settepolesini, Ponte Rodoni, Santa Bianca, Casumaro (partially).

Government
  - Mayor: Simone Saletti

Area
  - Total: 174.76 km^{2} (67.48 sq mi)
- Elevation: 13 m (43 ft)

Population (31 December 2017)
  - Total: 14,217
  - Density: 81.352/km^{2} (210.70/sq mi)
- Demonym: Bondenesi or Bondesani
- Time zone: UTC+1 (CET)
  - Summer (DST): UTC+2 (CEST)
- Postal code: 44012
- Dialing code: 0532
- Website: Official website

Bondeno (Bondenese: Bundén) is a comune (municipality) in the province of Ferrara, in the Italian region of Emilia-Romagna, located about 45 kilometres (28 mi) north of Bologna and about 15 kilometres (9 mi) northwest of Ferrara.

The municipality of Bondeno contains the frazioni (subdivisions, mainly villages and hamlets) Burana, Gavello, Ospitale, Pilastri, Ponte Rodoni, Salvatonica, San Biagio, Santa Bianca, Scortichino, Settepolesini, Stellata, and Zerbinate.

Bondeno borders the following municipalities: Cento, Ferrara, Ficarolo, Finale Emilia, Mirandola, Sermide e Felonica, Terre del Reno, Vigarano Mainarda. Its territory is crossed by the Panaro river.

== History ==
In the 1463, in the city of Bondeno was probably printed the first movable character book of the whole Italian history, a Bible, using the printing press method.

== List of mayors ==
Mayor	Term start	Term end	Party
Ettore Campi	1995	1999	Italian People's Party
Davide Verri	1999	2009	National Alliance
Alan Fabbri	2009	2015	Lega Nord
Fabio Bergamini	2015	Incumbent	Lega Nord

== Twin towns ==
Bondeno is twinned with:

- Dillingen an der Donau, Germany
- Bihać, Bosnia and Herzegovina
- Orsha, Belarus
