= Poggio Renatico =

- Comune
- Comune di Poggio Renatico
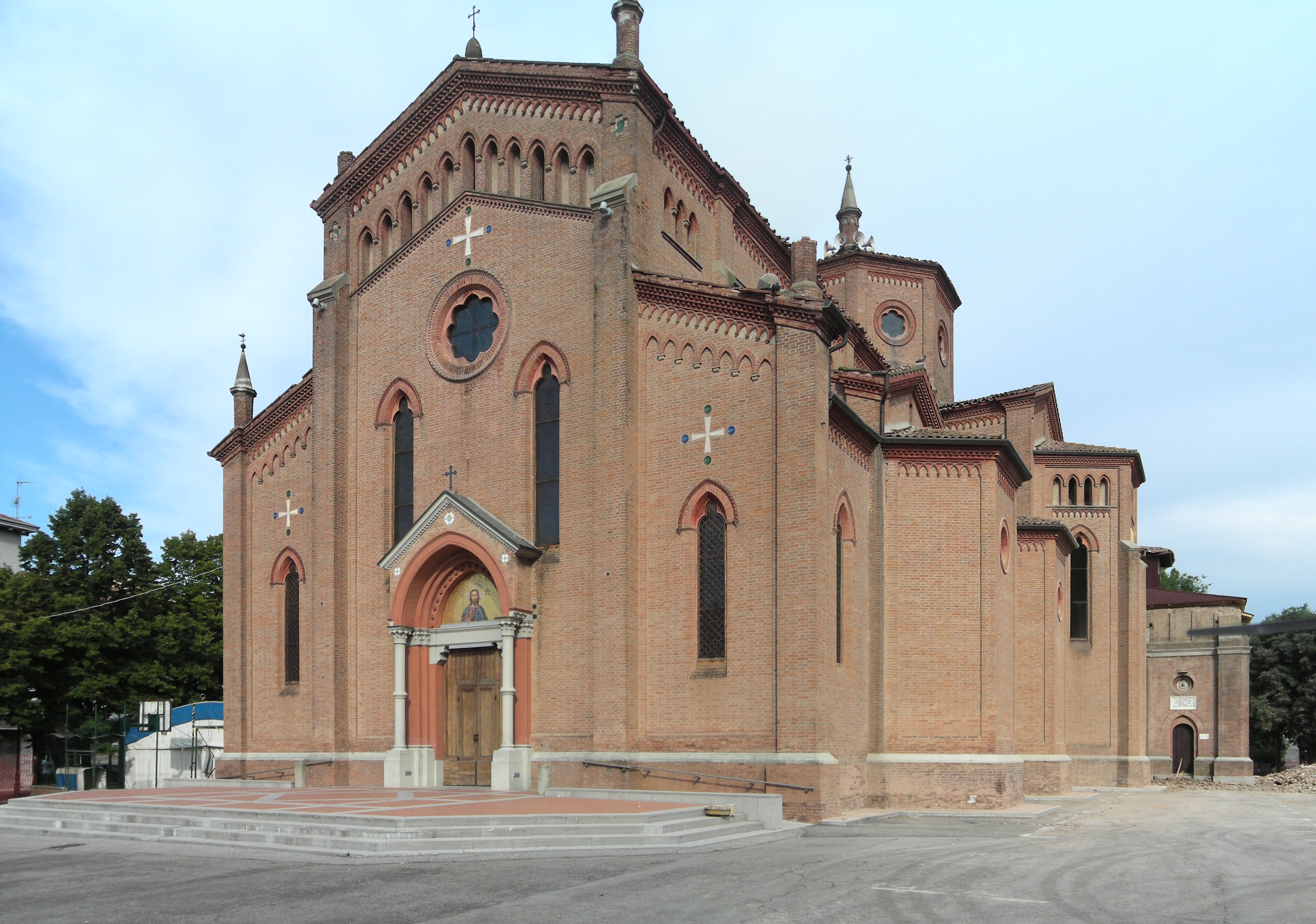
- Church in Renatico

- Flag Coat of arms

- Location within Italy Location within Emilia-Romagna
- Coordinates: 44°46′N 11°30′E
- Country: Italy
- Region: Emilia-Romagna
- Province: Province of Ferrara (FE)
- Frazioni: Chiesa Nuova, Coronella, Gallo, Madonna Boschi

Government
  - Mayor: Daniele Garuti

Area
  - Total: 80.23 km^{2} (30.98 sq mi)
- Elevation: 10 m (33 ft)

Population (31 August 2022)
  - Total: 9,670
  - Density: 121/km^{2} (312/sq mi)
- Demonym: Poggesi
- Time zone: UTC+1 (CET)
  - Summer (DST): UTC+2 (CEST)
- Postal code: 44028
- Dialing code: 0532
- Website: Official website

Poggio Renatico (Poggese: Al Puz; Ferrarese: Al Pògio) is a comune (municipality) in the Province of Ferrara in the Italian region Emilia-Romagna, located about 30 kilometres (19 mi) northeast of Bologna and about 12 kilometres (7 mi) southwest of Ferrara.

Poggio Renatico borders on the following municipalities: Baricella, Ferrara, Galliera, Malalbergo, Terre del Reno, Vigarano Mainarda.

== History ==
During the Middle Ages, the region of Poggio Renatico was fortified by the rulers of Bologna through a discontinuous line of towers and castles that provided exclusive control of fishing and river trade and protection against the expansionist intentions of neighboring Ferrara.

About 5 kilometres (3 mi) outside Poggio Renatico is one of the Italian Air Force's biggest radar stations, which was formerly used to monitor air traffic over Yugoslavia and southern Warsaw Pact countries.

In 2010, NATO controlled its air forces in southern Europe from the Poggio Renatico radar base, and in March 2010 it provided military control over the airspace between the Danube delta and the Atlantic Ocean.

In May 2011, this Italian Air Force radar station was used by NATO as the nerve center for coordinating air strikes during the Libyan Civil War.

Poggio Renatico was hit by the 2012 Emilia earthquakes which caused the Lambertini Castle clock tower to collapse. The earthquake also damaged the dome and bell tower of the Abbey Church of St. Michael the Archangel. On 4 June 2012 (several weeks after the earthquake) the steeple of the church was demolished with explosives.

== Main sights ==
- Lambertini Castle
- Abbey of St. Michael the Archangel
- The Abbey of St. Michael the Archangel
- Tower of the Uccellino, also called the Usolino
- The Tower of the Cocenno
- The Tower of the Poggio, also called that of the Ortolano or Fornasini
- The Tower of the Verga, also called that of the Vedrega
- The Clock Tower of Poggio Renatico

== Notable people ==
- Carlo Fornasini (1854-1931), micropalaeontologist, mayor of Poggio Renato for almost thirty years
- Carlo Pareschi (1898-1944), Fascist politician, member of the Grand Council of Fascism and minister of agriculture of the Kingdom of Italy from 1941 to 1943
