= San Paolo, Mirabello =

Church in Mirabello, Ferrara, Italy

Coordinates: 44.8254°N 11.4610°E

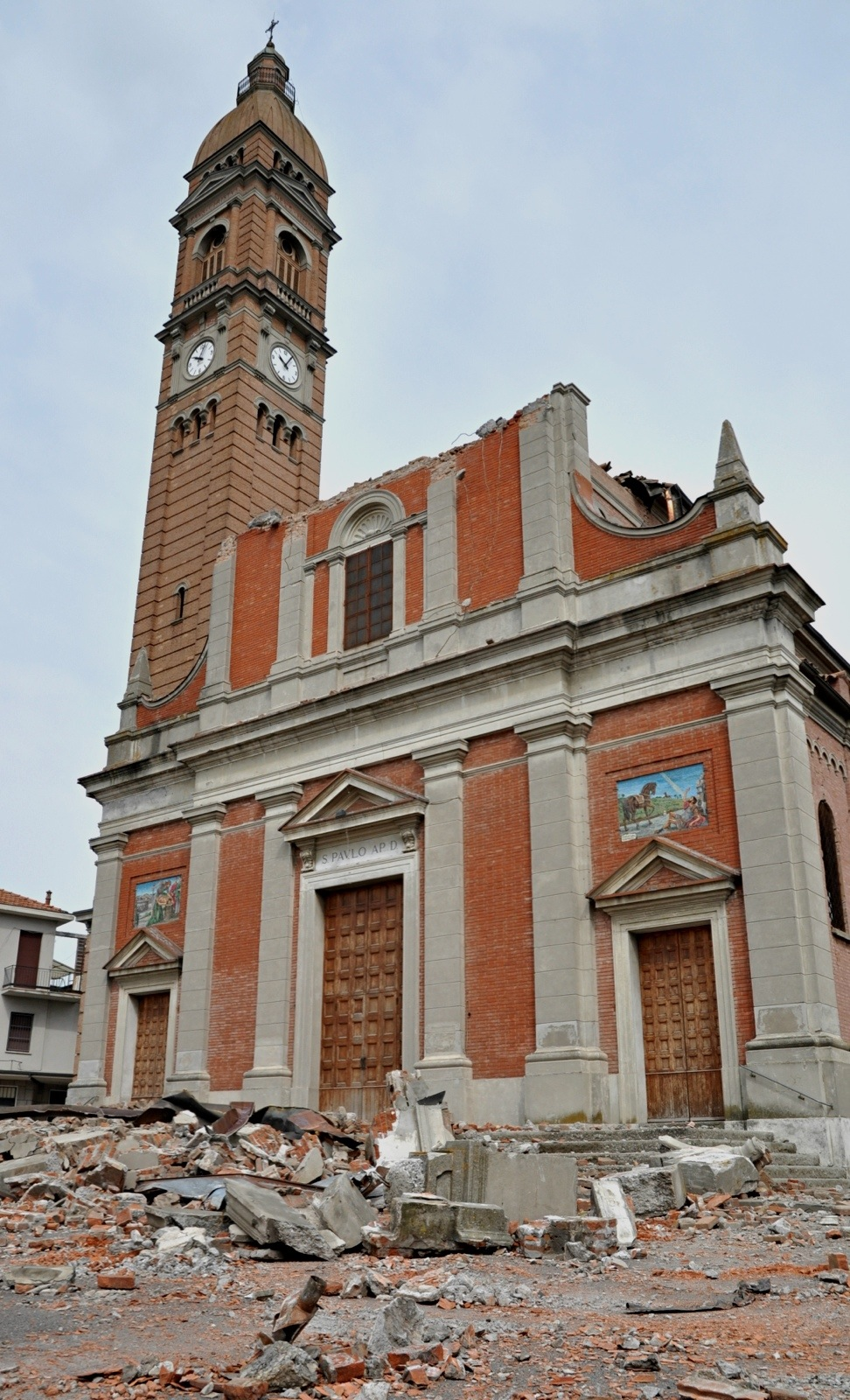
Church of Saint Paul in Mirabello.

The Church of Saint Paul (Italian: San Paolo Di Mirabello) is a church in Mirabello, Ferrara, Italy. It was damaged in the 2012 Northern Italy earthquakes.
