= Vigarano Mainarda =

- Comune
- Comune di Vigarano Mainarda
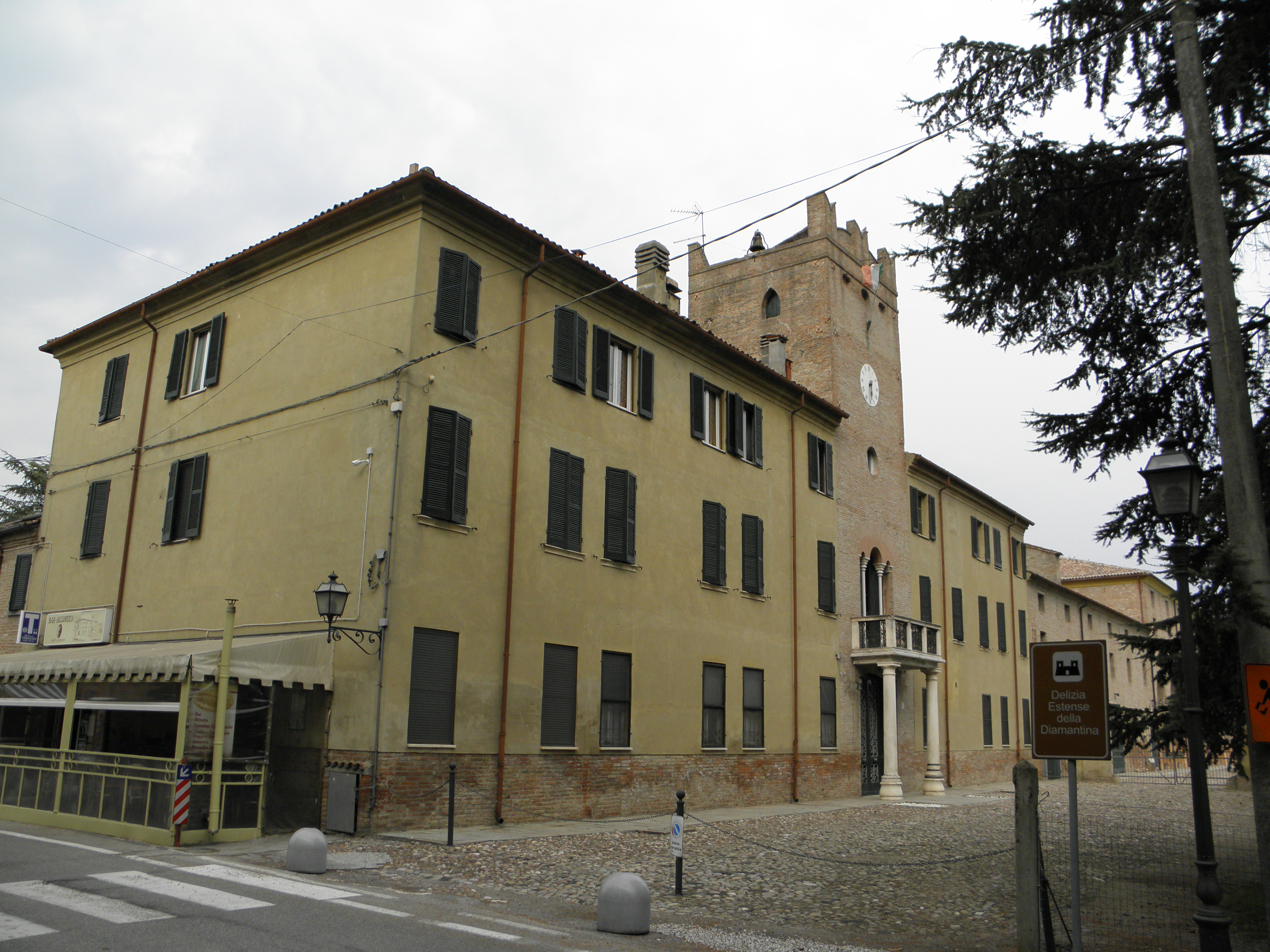
- View of Vigarano Mainarda

- Flag Coat of arms

- Location within Italy Location within Emilia-Romagna
- Coordinates: 44°51′N 11°30′E
- Country: Italy
- Region: Emilia-Romagna
- Province: Ferrara (FE)
- Frazioni: Borgo, Castello, Coronella (partially), Diamantina, Madonna dei Boschi (partially), Tortiola, Vigarano Pieve

Government
  - Mayor: Davide Bergamini

Area
  - Total: 42.02 km^{2} (16.22 sq mi)
- Elevation: 10 m (33 ft)

Population (31 December 2021)
  - Total: 7,551
  - Density: 179.7/km^{2} (465.4/sq mi)
- Demonym: Vigaranesi
- Time zone: UTC+1 (CET)
  - Summer (DST): UTC+2 (CEST)
- Postal code: 44049
- Dialing code: 0532
- Website: Official website

Vigarano Mainarda (Ferrarese: Vigaràn Mainarda) is a comune (municipality) in the Province of Ferrara in the Italian region Emilia-Romagna, located about 40 kilometres (25 mi) northeast of Bologna and about 9 kilometres (6 mi) west of Ferrara.

Vigarano Mainarda borders the following municipalities: Bondeno, Ferrara, Poggio Renatico and Terre del Reno

== Science ==
The Vigarano meteorite fell here in 1910: it is considered the prototype of a class of carbonaceous chondrites known as "CV group" (where the "V" comes from the name Vigarano). Vigarano-like carbonaceous (CV) chondrites contain once-melted (igneous) CAIs that crystallized Al-, Ti-rich calcic pyroxene (fassaite) containing Ti 3+ The substantial Ti 3+ in these pyroxenes indicates highly reduced crystallization conditions in their parental melts, which also record the oldest radiometric ages of all Solar System materials.

== People ==
- Paolo Mazza (1901–1981), football manager.
- Carlo Rambaldi (1925–2012), special effects artist

== Twin towns ==
- Caudebec-lès-Elbeuf, France
- Salgótarján, Hungary
- Altomonte, Italy
