= Sant'Agostino, Emilia–Romagna =

Sant'Agostino
- Frazione
- Location of Sant'Agostino in Italy
- Coordinates: 44°48′N 11°23′E
- Country: Italy
- Region: Emilia-Romagna
- Province: Ferrara (FE)
- Comune: Terre del Reno

Area
  - Total: 35.2 km^{2} (13.6 sq mi)
- Elevation: 15 m (49 ft)

Population (31 December 2010)
  - Total: 7,106
  - Density: 202/km^{2} (523/sq mi)
- Time zone: UTC+1 (CET)
  - Summer (DST): UTC+2 (CEST)
- Postal code: 44047
- Dialing code: 0532

Sant'Agostino was a comune (municipality) in the Province of Ferrara in the Italian region Emilia-Romagna, located about 35 kilometres (22 mi) north of Bologna and about 20 kilometres (12 mi) west of Ferrara. From 1 January 2017 the comune was unified with Mirabello and the new municipality took the name of Terre del Reno.

== Earthquake victims ==
Two workers died in a Sant'Agostino ceramics factory when the building collapsed during an earthquake which hit the region in the early morning of May 20, 2012.

The following day the affected region, which extended to Lombardy and Veneto, experienced a succession of aftershocks, the strongest of which took place in the early afternoon and was itself rated at 5.1 on the Richter scale.
