= Prospettiva di Corso Giovecca, Ferrara =

Arch in Ferrara, Italy

Coordinates: 44°49′56″N 11°37′57″E

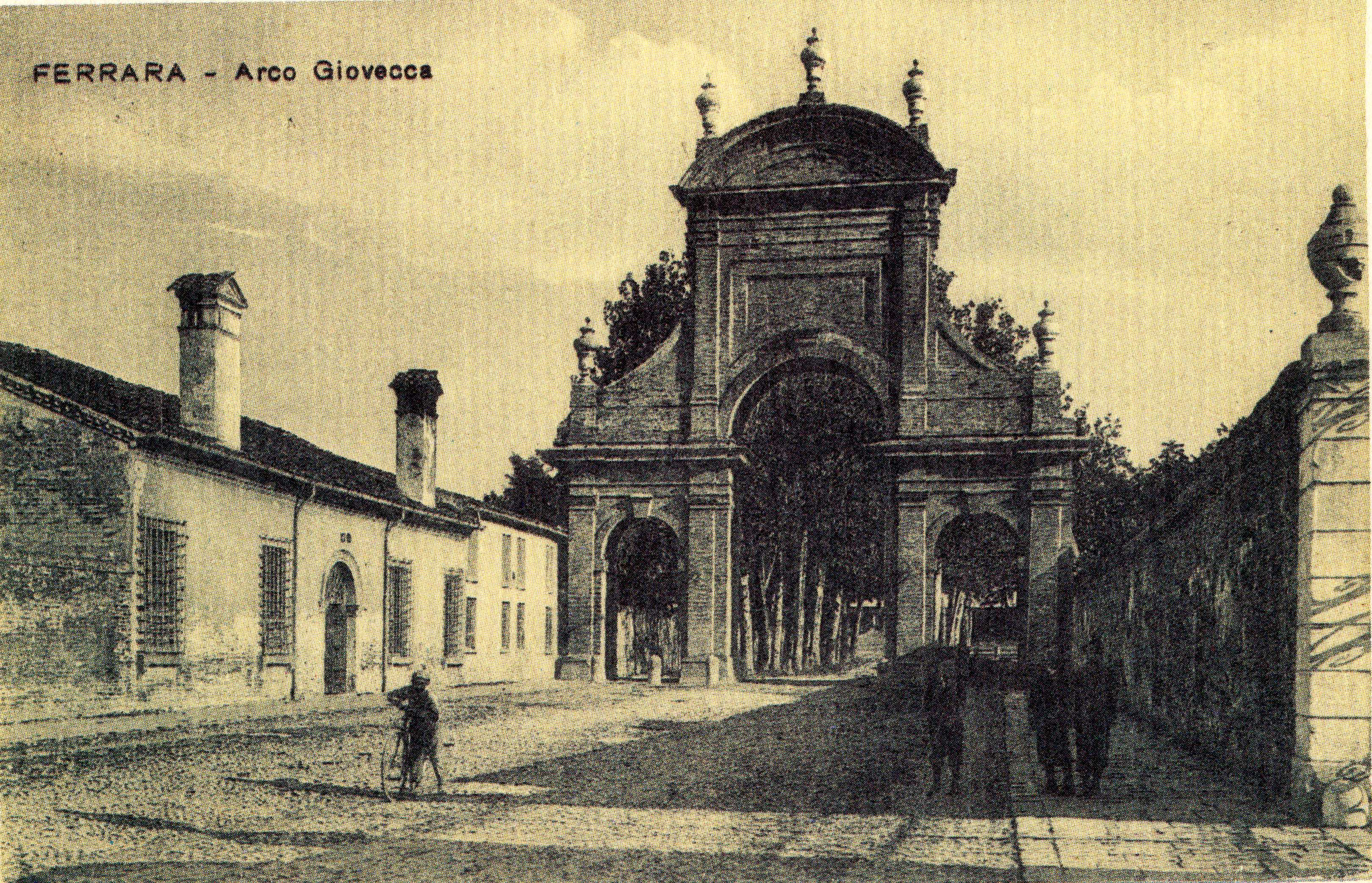
Prospettiva di Corso Giovecca in 1915

The Prospettiva di Corso Giovecca, also called commonly Arcoche, is a scenic and decorative arch located at the end of Corso Giovecca, in Ferrara, region of Emilia-Romagna, Italy.

The brick arch was designed by Francesco Mazzarelli and built during 1703–04. Originally, the structure was composed of three arches decorated with marble heraldic shields. Two further flanking narrow openings were added in the 20th century with the widening of the road. Previously the arches were surmounted by decorative spires; these were removed after the 2012 earthquake.

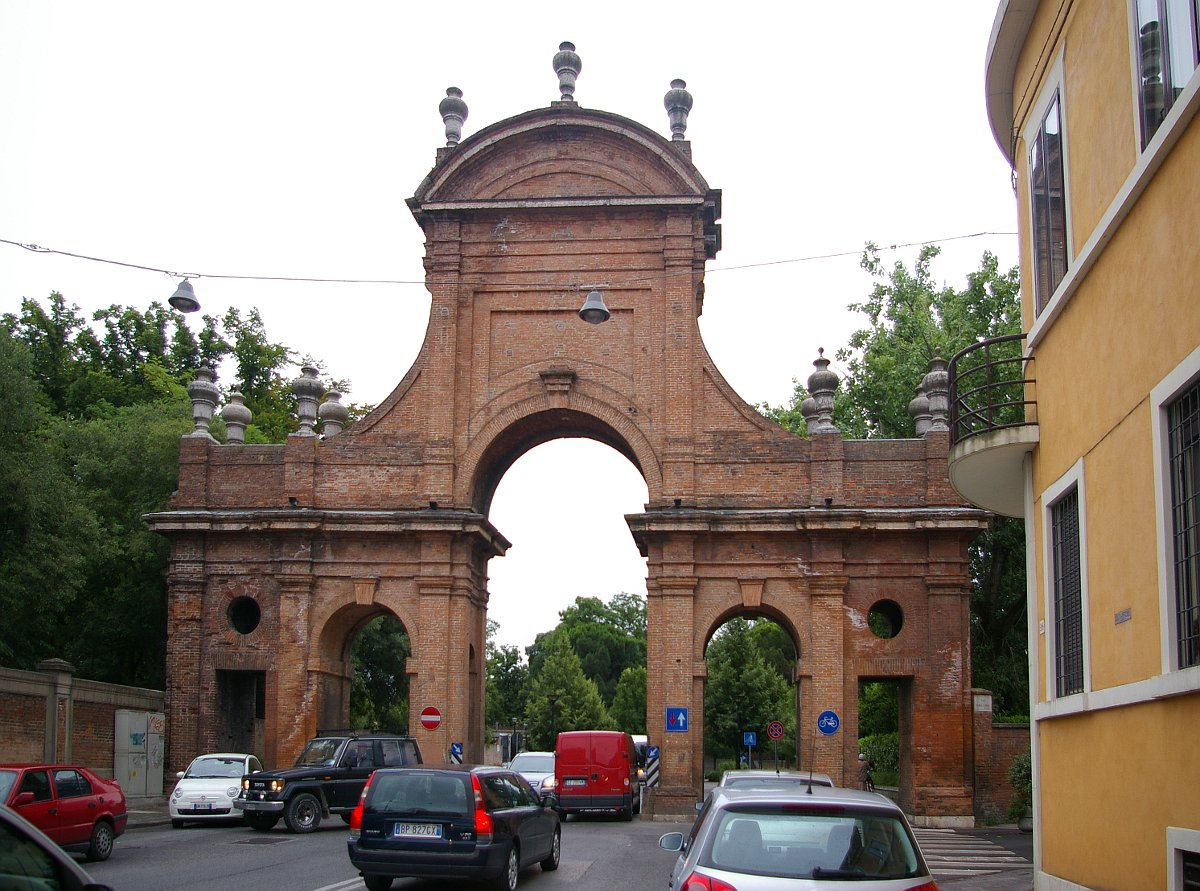
Arch before 2012 earthquake

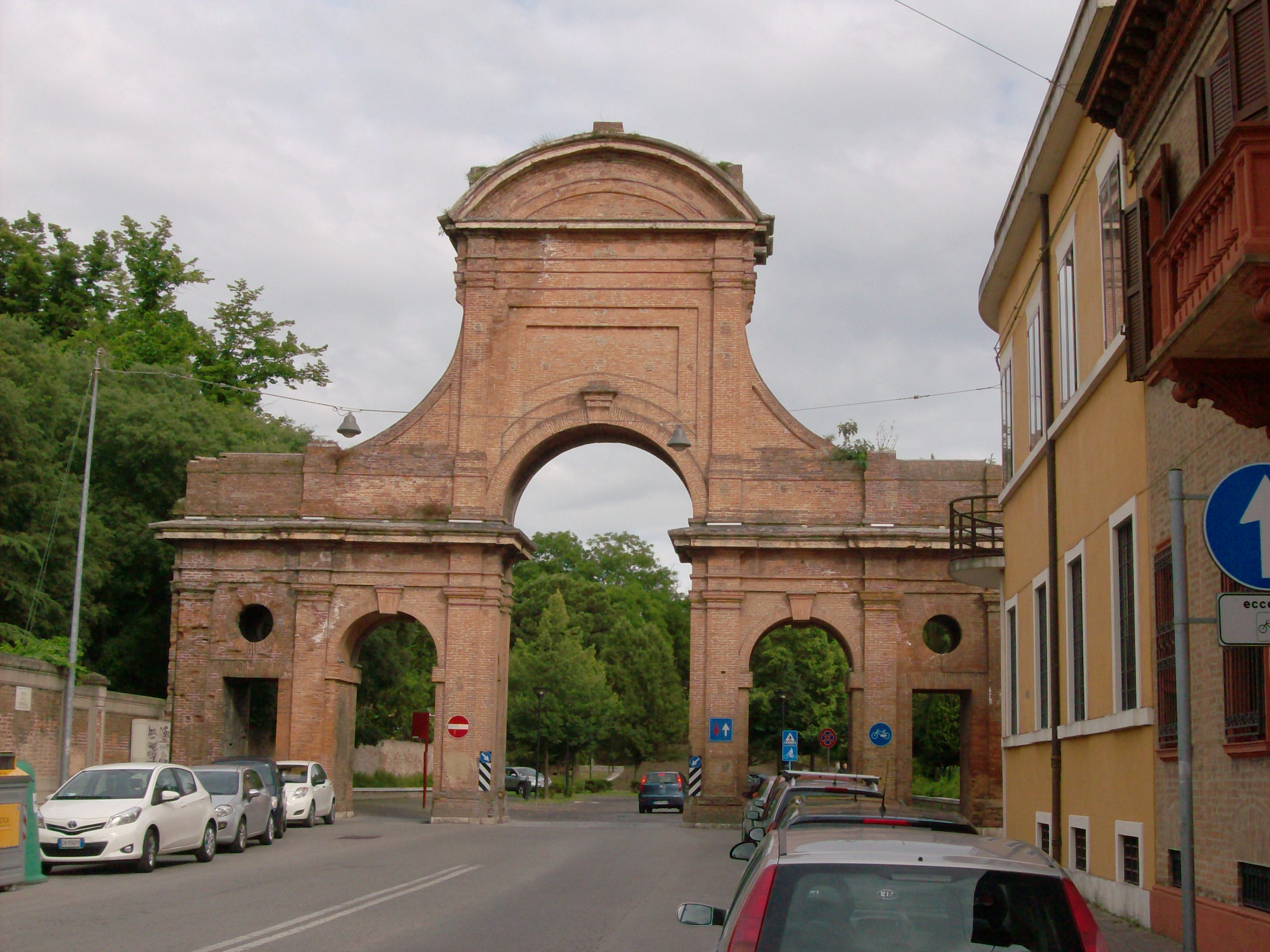
Arch after 2012 earthquake, without spires
