= Panaro (river) =

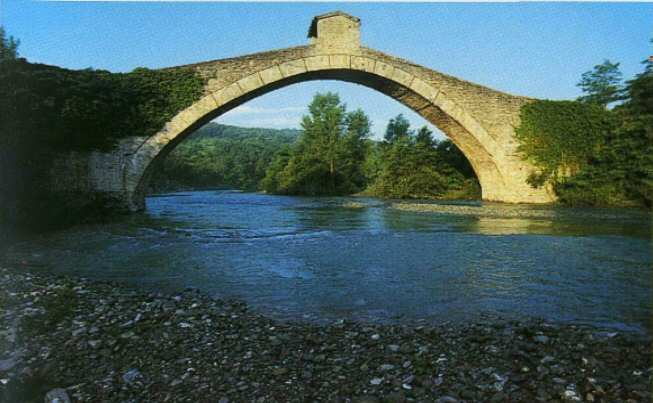
- Bridge of Olina

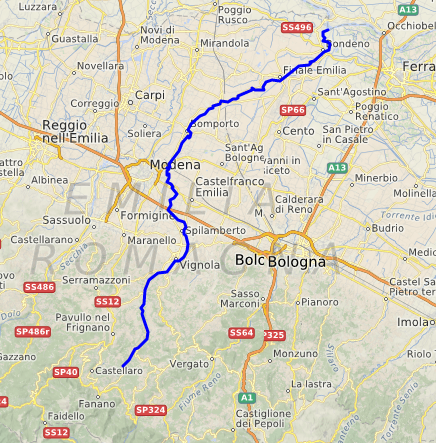

Location
- Country: Italy

Physical characteristics
- Source
  - location: Monte Rondinaio (Foce a Giovo)
  - elevation: 1,600 m (5,200 ft)
- Mouth
  - location: River Po near Ferrara
  - coordinates: 44.9260°N 11.4237°E
- Length: 148 km (92 mi)
- Basin size: 2,292 km^{2} (885 mi^{2})
- Discharge
  - average: 37 m^{3}/s (1,300 cu ft/s)

Basin features
- Progression: Po→ Adriatic Sea

The Panaro is an Italian river and the final right-hand tributary to the Po, discounting the Cavo Napoleonico canal. It runs right across Emilia-Romagna in a north-easterly direction: from its source close to the Apennine watershed, where Emilia-Romagna meets Tuscany, to its outlet where the Po marks the region's boundary with Veneto. Its Latin name was Scultenna.

It is 148 kilometres (92 mi) long, with a 2,292-square-kilometre (885 mi^{2}) drainage basin; alternating between aridity in summer and fullness in spring and autumn.

Its principal source, the Rio delle Tagliole, rises at Foce a Giovo, Monte Rondinaio, some 12 kilometres (7 mi) south-west of highest peak of the Tuscan-Emillian Apennines, Monte Cimone, elevation 2,165 metres (7,103 ft). From here it flows down the valley in a northeastern direction. At Pievepelago (in the Province of Modena) it changes name to Scoltenna, assuming in the territory of Pavullo nel Frignano finally that of Panaro. In this area it makes up the border between the communities of Montana del Frignano and Montana dell’appennino Modena Est. Close to Modena, it joins the Naviglio de Modena and becomes navigable until its confluence with the Po, a little to the west of Ferrara. It runs through Vignola, Finale Emilia and Bondeno.

Of particular historical and artistic interest is the bridge of Olina, constructed in 1522, crossing the river close to the small town of the same name, in the commune of Pavullo nel Frignano.
