= Ferrarese dialect =

Ferrarese Dialect Language

Ferrarese
- dialèt fraréś
- Native to: Italy
- Region: Ferrara
- Ethnicity: Ferrarese people
- Native speakers: ~180,000
- Language family: Indo-European: Italic; Latino-Faliscan; Latin; Romance; Italo-Western; Western Romance; Gallo-Romance; Gallo-Italic; Emilian–Romagnol; Emilian; Ferrarese
- Dialects: Comacchiese?
- Writing system: Latin

Language codes
- ISO 639-3: –
- Glottolog: None
- Linguasphere: 51-AAA-okh
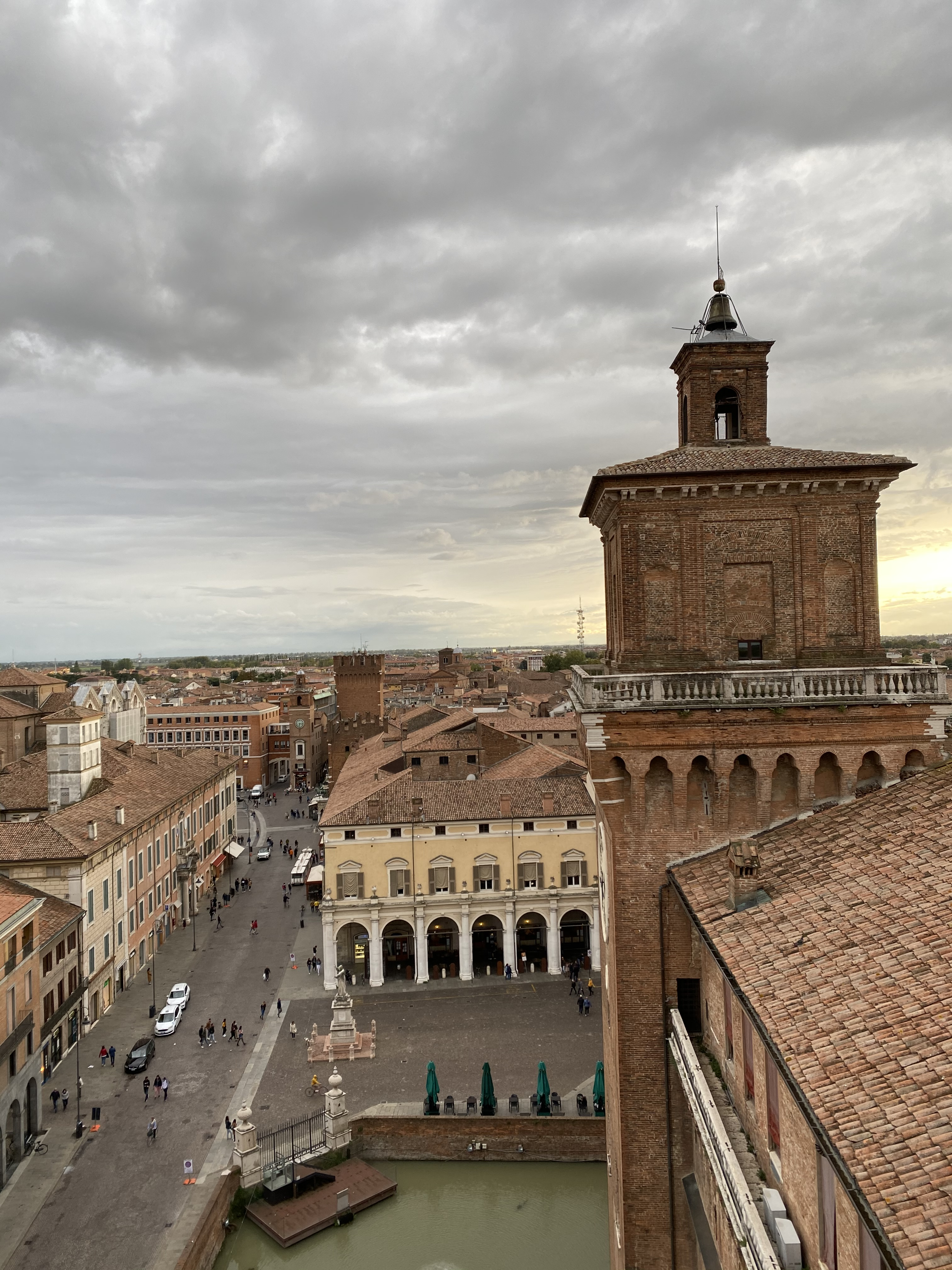
- Ferrara as seen from Castello Estense

The Ferrarese dialect (traditional orthography: dialèt fraréś) refers to the indigenous Romance language that pre-dates the establishment of Italian, spoken by the native inhabitants of the city and environs of Ferrara, a city located in the Emilia-Romagna region of Italy.

Ferrarese, in addition to Emilia-Romagna, is also spoken in the area of Fertilia, in the Sassari province of Sardinia, because a sizable community from Ferrara established itself in the area following a Mussolini-sponsored development program during Fascist Italy.

The classification of this dialect remains an unsettled matter. Historically, Ferrarese has been considered a member of the Gallo-Italic family of dialects, which compose the majority of dialects spoken in Emilia-Romagna. The first proponent of this idea was Bernardino Biondelli, who included it in his 1853 work Saggio Sui Dialetti Gallo-Italici.

More recently however, this traditional categorization has come under increased scrutiny by scholars such as Romano Baiolini and Floriana Guidetti in their 2005 work Saggio Di Grammatica Comparata Del Dialetto Ferrarese. They and others claim that Ferrarese should instead be categorized as "Latin-Italic" due to phonological and historical/archeological considerations. Specifically, they argue that the vowel system mirrors Imperial Latin more closely than surrounding dialects such as Bolognese do. Guidetti and Biaolini analyze vocalic quadrilaterals to highlight the differences present between the phonologies of Gallo-Italic and Ferrarese.

Additionally, Guidetti points out in her Q&A paper that Ferrarese differs from many Gallo-Italic dialects in that it has preserved the /a/ phoneme in first-conjugation Latin verbs such as andàr and cantàr, while other dialects such as Romagnol have diachronically shifted to mid-vowels andèr and cantèr.

Regarding the historical and archeological considerations, these scholars argue that Gallo-Italic dialects should be heavily influenced by ancient Gallic peoples (also referred to as Gauls), a group of Celtic, pre-Roman tribes which had settlements across Northern Italy before the eventual conquest of the region by the Romans. Their claim is, therefore, that Ferrarese must not be a Gallo-Italic dialect because no significant archeological remains of settlement prior to Roman urbanization have been discovered in the once marshy and inhospitable area, and that the new Roman settlers in the region could thus not have been overly-influenced by Gallic linguistic observances.

Not all scholars are convinced by these ideas. In The Expression of Indefiniteness in Italo-Ferrarese Bilectal Speakers, doubt is cast on these claims (particularly in section 3.2 Origins, Classification, and Contacts).

== Demographics and usage today ==
Although it is difficult to obtain accurate demographics of speaker numbers, it is generally believed that the overwhelming majority of fluent Ferrarese speakers today are elderly people, while younger generations speak the dialect with varying degrees of fluency and frequency. This trend has been confirmed by a survey conducted by ISTAT (the Italian national institute of statistics) in 2015, which collected data suggesting that the use of dialects is in general decline throughout Italy.

Furthermore, the same study observed that 55,6% of Italians speak almost exclusively in Italian within the family context. This number becomes even higher (63.2%) within the context of speaking with friends. The general trend observed is that younger and more educated people tend to speak Italian more than dialects.

== Language basics: grammar and paradigms ==
- Please note, the paradigms and examples found in this section have been edited to include English.

Ferrarese, as an Italian dialect, follows many of the same grammatical patterns present in standard Italian, with the notable exception of clitics, which will be discussed in greater detail below.

Verb: To be

Ferrarese	Italian	English
mi a sóŋ	Io sono	I am
ti at jé	Tu sei	You are
lu l'è	Lui/Lei è	He/She/It is
nu a séŋ	Noi siamo	We are
vu a si	Voi siete	You (all) are
lór i jè	Loro sono	They are

Verb: To sing (Regular -are verb)

Ferrarese	Italian	English
mi a kaŋt	Io canto	I sing
ti at kàŋti	Tu canti	You sing
lu al kàŋta	Lui/lei canta	He/She/It sings
nu a kaŋtéŋ	Noi cantiamo	We sing
vu a kaŋté	Voi cantate	You (all) sing
lór i kaŋta	Loro cantano	They sing

Paradigms retrieved from: https://www.robertobigoni.it/Servizi/Ferrarese/ilFerrarese.html

The Ferrarese example above exemplifies word particles that aren't present in Standard Italian being used as an integral part of the inflection process. These particles are called "pronominal clitics"..

== Syntax: Clitics ==
Ferrarese differs from Standard Italian in that it makes regular use of special particles called "pronominal clitics". A clitic is an umbrella term for words or word particles that "lean" (from the Ancient Greek etymology ἐγκλιτικός enklitikós, meaning "to lean") onto an adjacent word. There are many different types of clitics which have a variety of grammatical, syntactical, and phonological functions, and many languages utilize them. Below are some examples of clitics.

Latin: Senatus Populusque Romanus (-que, meaning "and")

French: Il en remplit un verre. (en, meaning "with it")

English: Your friend from Chicago’s arrival "('s", indicating possession, The arrival of the friend from Chicago)

In Ferrarese, there are several different categories of clitics, which include: subject clitics, object clitics, and quantitative clitics. Below, see attached a table of the various tonic and clitic subject pronouns in the Ferrarese dialect.

Table showing showing paradigms of subject pronouns (tonic and clitic) in the Ferrarese dialect

	Tonic pronouns	Clitic pronouns
1 ps	Mi	A
2 ps	Ti	at (+C) /t (+V)
3 ps	Lu (M) Lie (F)	al (+C) /l (+V) la (+C) /l (+V)
1 pp	Nu / Nuàltar	A
2 pp	Vu/ Uàltar	A
3 pp	Lòr (M) Lor (F)	i ill

=== Noun-expansion and obligatory pronominalization in the Ferrarese dialect ===
One of the more interesting syntactic phenomena in the Ferrarese dialect is obligatory extension or reference to nouns through the use of pronominal clitics. Standard Italian, by contrast, does not make normal use of this feature.

i.

FE: "Nu a scorén al frarès"

IT: Parliamo il ferrarese

EN: We speak Ferrarese.

In this example, a pronominal subject clitic is required to make the sentence grammatically correct. Note that "A" is not the typical tonic pronoun, but the clitic pronoun. While it is possible to drop the tonic pronoun, it is ungrammatical to drop the clitic. This is an obligatory feature that exists in Ferrarese and several other Italian dialects that does not exist in Standard Italian. In the examples below, the tonic pronoun is unnecessary, but the clitic subject pronoun must be present.

ii.

FE: "A són astèmi."

IT: Sono astemio.

EN: I am a teetotaller.

=== Comparison of pronominal clitic usage in Ferrarese and Standard Italian ===
The following sentences provide a comparison of pronominal clitic between Ferrarese and Standard Italian.

iii.

FE: I n compra mai fruta, il mie sureli

They not buy never fruit, the my sisters

EN: ‘My sisters never buy fruit’

IT: Non comprano mai frutta, le mie sorelle.

Not they buy never fruit, the my sisters.

iv.

FE: T’ an compri mai di pum

You not buy never di+ART.PL apples

EN: ‘You never buy apples’

IT: Non compri mai delle mele

Not you buy never di+ART.PL apples

In example iii, Ferrarese puts a pronoun clitic "i" before the verb "comprano". This combines with the negation word "an" and through phonological elision becomes "in." The Italian examples do not employ this feature.

In example iv, the same process is at work, with the only difference being that the subject clitic is the second person "t" which combines with negation "an" to form: "t’an".

By comparison, there is no subject pronoun clitic preceding the negation in the Standard Italian examples "Non comprano mai frutta, le mie sorelle" and "Non compri mai delle mele".

=== Phonological considerations ===
In Ferrarese, the introduction of clitics into a sentence or phrase can bring about interesting phonological reactions. In table 10 (Procentese) detailing the tonic and clitic pronouns, the second and third person singular are particularly sensitive to consonantal or vocalic environments.

Ferrarese definite article surfacing

al (m.sg before consonant);

l’ (m.sg before vowel and in proclitic position);

la (f.sg before consonant);

l’ (f.sg before vowel);

i (m.pl before consonant);

j’ (m.pl before vowel);

ill (f.pl before consonant);

j’ or gl’ (f.pl before vowel).

This pattern has important implications for verbs that begin with a vowel, such as "to have" shown below:

present	future	imperfect
mi a ɣ o	mi a ɣ avrò	mi a ɣ éva
ti at ɣ a	ti at ɣ avrà	ti at ɣ évi
lu al ɣ a	lu al ɣ avrà	lu al ɣ éva
nu a ɣ [av]éŋ	nu a ɣ avréŋ	nu a ɣ évaŋ
vu a ɣ avì	vu a ɣ avrì	vu a ɣ évi
lór i ɣ a	lór i ɣ avrà	lór i ɣ éva

In this case, the IPA symbol [ɣ] has been inserted to show the phonological change that occurs (pronounced similarly to an English hard g).

However, the clitics can elide with other clitics and the negative particle "n". In the latter case, a vocal prosthetic vowel is inserted to address the phonological impossibility in Ferrarese of "[tg] or [tn]. This may be seen in examples v and vi below:

v.

FE: T’ag dai

IT: Gli dai

(You+Him+give)

EN: (you give him)

vi.

FE: t’an cant

(you+not+sing)

IT: Non canti

EN: (you don’t sing)

=== Note on CLLD (clitic left dislocation and clitic resumption ===
Ferrarese, like many other Romance languages such as Italian and Spanish, makes use of Clitic Left Dislocation. Clitic Left Dislocation (or CLLD) is a process in which a Determiner Phrase (an article + a noun) is shifted to the left edge of the sentence. The Determiner Phrase which has been shifted is then represented in the clause by a pronominal clitic. The dislocated Determiner Phrase can be incorporated into a sentence as an optional adjunct in order to provide more information, but the sentence must be grammatical without them.

Some examples of this phenomenon are provided below:

vii.

Italian

Il vino non lo bevo

The wine not CL.ACC.3SG.m. drink

‘I don’t drink wine’

Ferrarese

Al vin an al bev brisa

the wine CL.NOM-1SG-not CL.ACC.3SG.m. drink NEG

‘I don’t drink wine’
