= Felonica =

- Frazione
- Location of Felonica in Italy
- Coordinates: 44°59′N 11°21′E
- Country: Italy
- Region: Lombardy
- Province: Mantua (MN)
- Comune: Sermide e Felonica

Area
  - Total: 22.5 km^{2} (8.7 sq mi)

Population (December 2004)
  - Total: 1,586
  - Density: 70.5/km^{2} (183/sq mi)
- Time zone: UTC+1 (CET)
  - Summer (DST): UTC+2 (CEST)
- Postal code: 46022
- Dialing code: 0386

Felonica is a frazione of the comune (municipality) of Sermide e Felonica in the Province of Mantua in the Italian region Lombardy, located about 180 kilometres (110 mi) southeast of Milan and about 50 kilometres (31 mi) southeast of Mantua. It was a separate comune until 2017.

A unique, savory and sweet variety of focaccia was created in Felonica, which is called Felonica Tiròt.
