= Central Synagogue of Milan =

Synagogue in Milan

- Sinagoga centrale di Milano
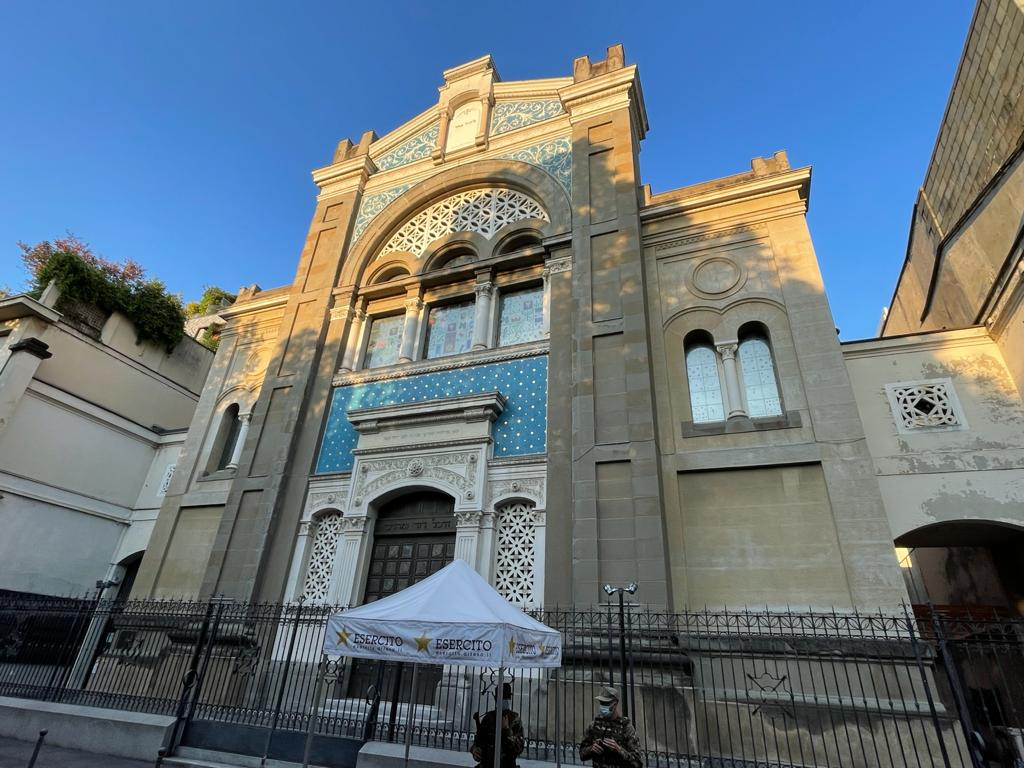
- Exterior of synagogue

Religion
- Affiliation: Judaism
- Rite: Italian rite

Location
- Location: Via Guastalla 19, Milan, Italy
- Interactive map of Central Synagogue of Milan
- Coordinates: 45°27′37″N 9°11′56″E

Architecture
- Architect: Luca Beltrami
- Style: Neo-Romanesque; Neo-Byzantine
- Completed: 1892 (original); 1947 (rebuilt)

The Central Synagogue of Milan (Italian: Sinagoga centrale di Milano) is the main center for Jewish worship in Milan, Italy. Since 1993, it has been known under the name Hechal David v'Mordechai Central Temple (Italian: Tempio centrale Hechal David u-Mordechai). It is of the Italian rite.

== History ==
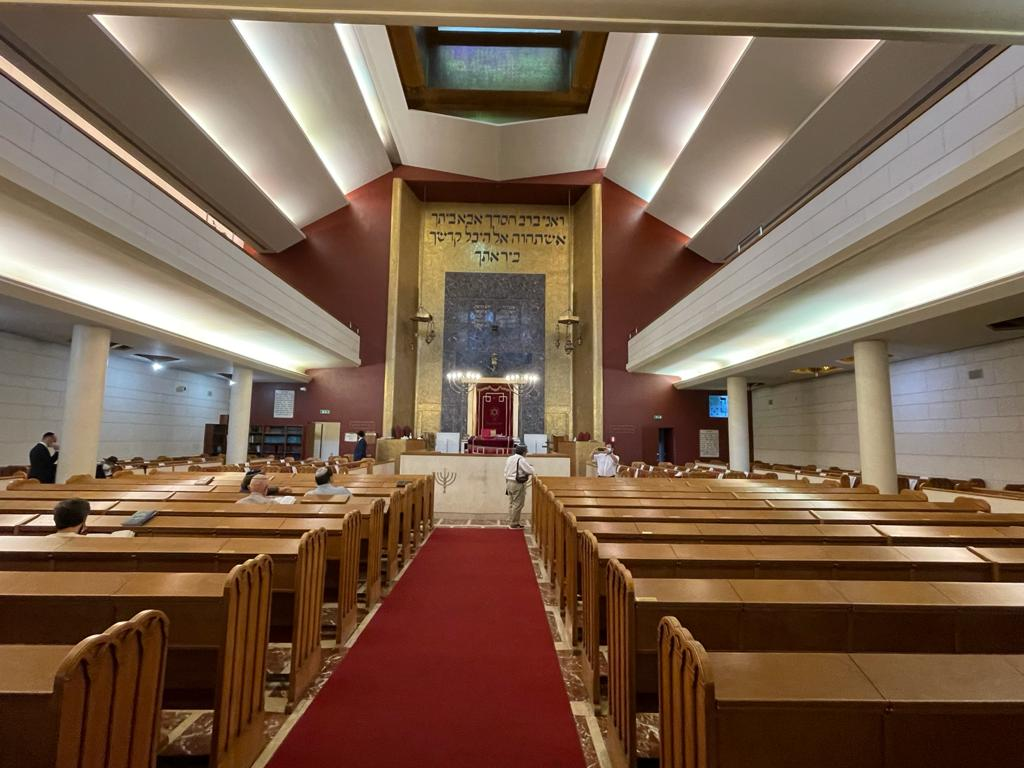
View of the Torah ark

Jewish emigration from other parts of Italy to Milan in the 19th century led to the construction of a large synagogue in place of a smaller oratory on Via Stampa 4, the previous location of worship for Milanese Jews. The project was undertaken by architect Luca Beltrami, a well-known architect in Milan who had been known for his work on the Piazza della Scala and the restoration of Sforza Castle. He was assisted by engineer Luigi Tenenti. The construction was subsidized under a loan by the government of Italy. The grand opening of the synagogue was conducted on September 28, 1892 to a large crowd, including the Jewish community and many authority figures from the city.

In August 1943, the roof of the synagogue was hit by fragments from bombing during WWII, destroying nearly the entire building. Only the facade remained in its near-entirety. Architectural team Manufredo D'Urbino and Eugenio Gentili Tedeschi were tasked with reconstructing the building.

The building underwent renovation in 1997, along with a redesign of the interior by Piero Pinto and Giancarlo Alhadeff. New windows were added on the sides and the ceiling was raised for the women's section. 23 panes of stained glass were added to the windows to flood the interior with color, created by New York-based designer Roger Selden. The windows include Jewish symbology such as the Star of David, shofar, menorah, and lulav.

== Design ==
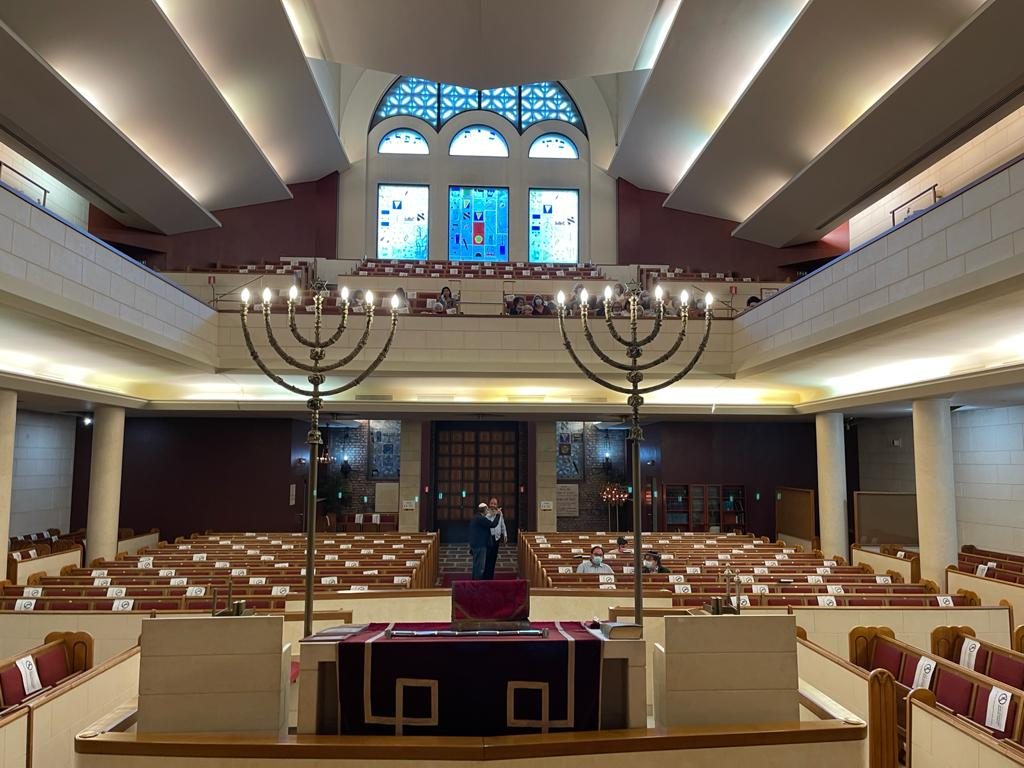
View of the synagogue interior from the bema

The synagogue was originally designed under a Basilica-style plan with three naves. The facade extended high and was embellished with blue and gold mosaic works. It is slightly recessed and distanced from the road by a long gate. It is divided into three sections, including two lower sides with archted windows resembling the tablets of the Ten Commandments. The center has a large portal sided with semi-columns and surmounded by a large arch with three windows above it, with a carved image of the Ten commandments at the top.

The building has three floors. The shul is on a slightly raised floor, and is overlooked by the women's section. A basement below has an auditorium named for Giancarlo Jarach, along with a small oratory whose furnishings come from the Synagogue of Sermide. The Torah ark in the shul comes from the Synagogue of Pesaro. Adjacent to the synagogue contains another oratory for the rabbinical offices. Their furnishings come from the old synagogue of Fiorenzuola d'Arda. The floor is original in addition to the facade, and is composed of Trani marble and Sicilian pearl marble.

Its redesign was heavily influenced by Rationalist architecture, but the exterior remains more original and the majority of the renovation focused on the walls and the color of the interior.

== See also ==
- List of synagogues in Italy
