= Malalbergo =

- Comune
- Comune di Malalbergo
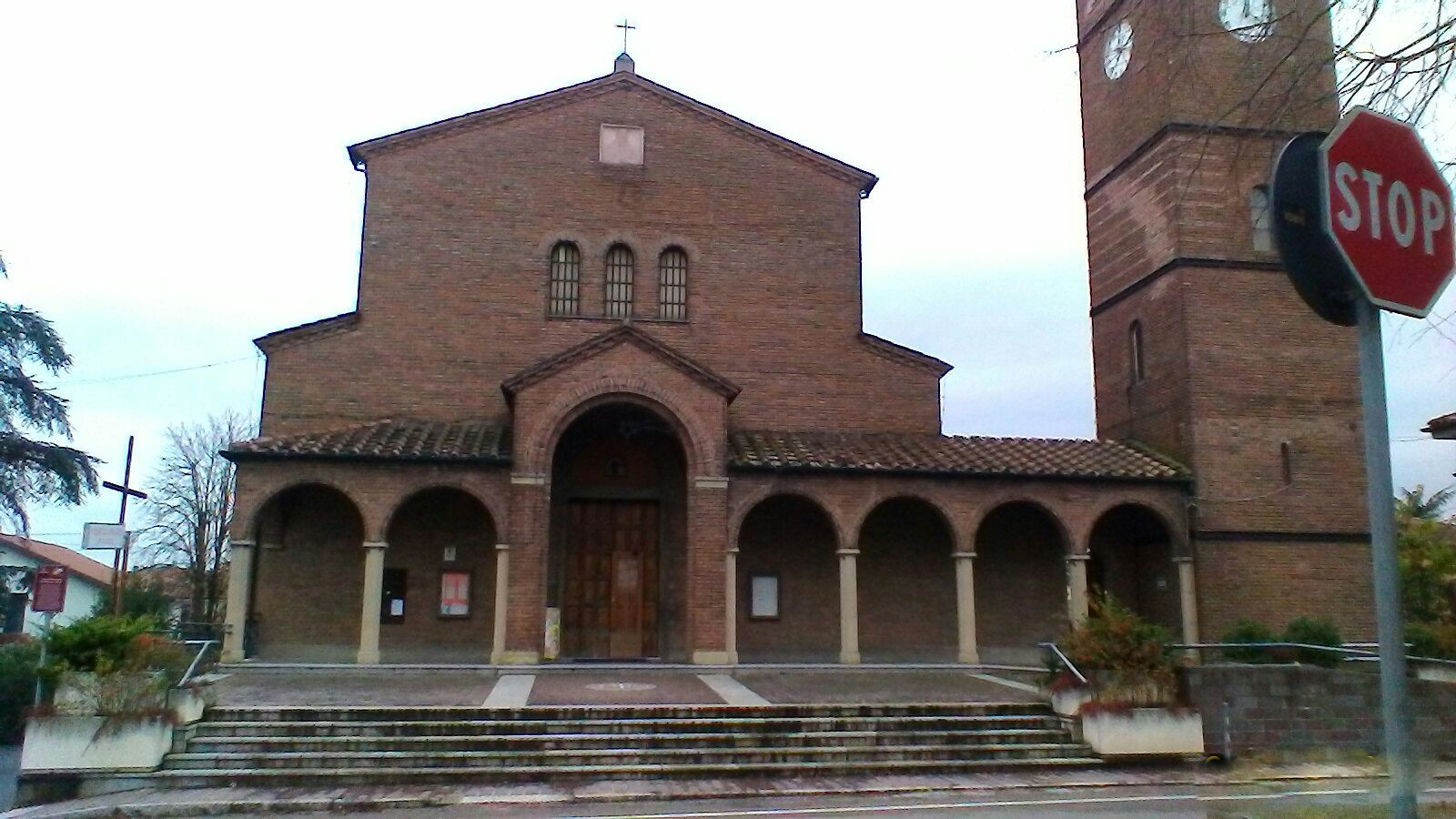

- Location within Italy Location within Emilia-Romagna
- Coordinates: 44°43′N 11°32′E
- Country: Italy
- Region: Emilia-Romagna
- Metropolitan city: Bologna (BO)
- Frazioni: Altedo, Ponticelli, Pegola, Casoni

Government
  - Mayor: Monia Giovannini

Area
  - Total: 53.8 km^{2} (20.8 sq mi)
- Elevation: 12 m (39 ft)

Population (30 September 2017)
  - Total: 9,061
  - Density: 168/km^{2} (436/sq mi)
- Demonym: Malalberghesi
- Time zone: UTC+1 (CET)
  - Summer (DST): UTC+2 (CEST)
- Postal code: 40058
- Dialing code: 051
- Website: Official website

Malalbergo (Bolognese: Malalbêrg) is a comune (municipality) in the Metropolitan City of Bologna in the Italian region Emilia-Romagna, located about 30 kilometres (19 mi) northeast of Bologna.

Malalbergo borders the following municipalities: Baricella, Bentivoglio, Galliera, Minerbio, Poggio Renatico, San Pietro in Casale.

== Twin towns ==
Malalbergo is twinned with:

- Saint-Denis-de-Pile, France (2023)
