= Galliera =

Municipality in Bologna

- Comune
- Comune di Galliera
- Flag Coat of arms

- Location within Italy Location within Emilia-Romagna
- Coordinates: 44°45′N 11°24′E
- Country: Italy
- Region: Emilia-Romagna
- Metropolitan city: Bologna (BO)
- Frazioni: Galliera, San Venanzio

Government
  - Mayor: Stefano Zanni

Area
  - Total: 37.15 km^{2} (14.34 sq mi)
- Elevation: 14 m (46 ft)

Population (31 August 2017)
  - Total: 5,444
  - Density: 146.5/km^{2} (379.5/sq mi)
- Demonym: Gallierini
- Time zone: UTC+1 (CET)
  - Summer (DST): UTC+2 (CEST)
- Postal code: 40015
- Dialing code: 051
- Patron saint: Beata Vergine del Carmine
- Saint day: July 16
- Website: Official website

Galliera (Northern Bolognese: Galîra) is a comune (municipality) in the Metropolitan City of Bologna in the Italian region Emilia-Romagna, located about 30 kilometres (19 mi) north of Bologna.

Galliera borders the following municipalities: Malalbergo, Pieve di Cento, Poggio Renatico, San Pietro in Casale, Terre del Reno.

== People ==
Josephine of Leuchtenberg (later Queen of Norway and Sweden) was made Duchess of Galliera at age 6 by Napoleon I in 1813.
