= 2012 Northern Italy earthquakes =

Severe earthquakes centered in Emilia-Romagna, Italy

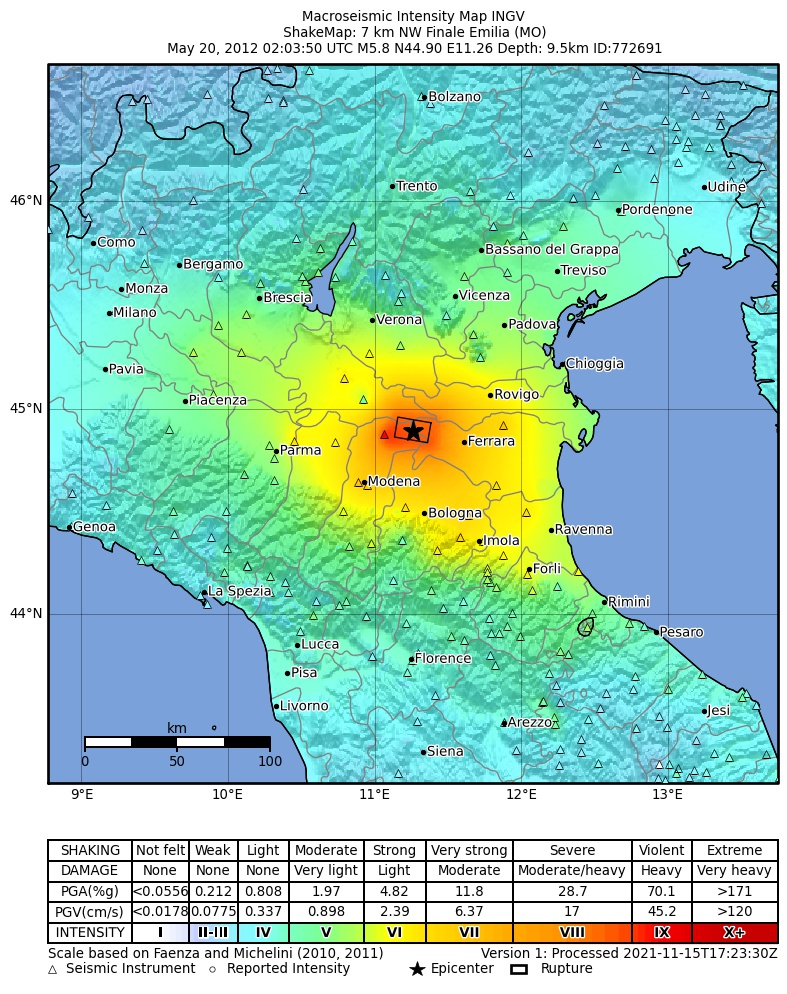
- USGS 20 May intensity map

- Location within Italy
- UTC time: 2012-05-20 02:03:53; 2012-05-29 07:00:03
- ISC event: 601025379; 605482196
- USGS-ANSS: ComCat; ComCat
- Local date: 20 May 2012; 29 May 2012
- Local time: 04:03; 09:00
- Duration: 12 seconds
- Magnitude: 6.0 M_{w}; 5.8 M_{w}
- Depth: 5.6 km (3.5 mi)
- Epicenter: 44.9°N 11.24°E
- Type: Reverse
- Areas affected: Emilia-Romagna, Italy
- Max. intensity: MMI VIII (Severe)
- Aftershocks: 86
- Casualties: 27 dead (7 on 20 May and 20 on 29 May), at least 50 injured in the first quake and 350 in the second, up to 45,000 homeless in total

In May 2012, two major earthquakes struck Northern Italy, causing 27 deaths and widespread damage. The events are known in Italy as the 2012 Emilia earthquakes, because they mainly affected the Emilia region.

The first earthquake, registering magnitude 6.0, struck in the Emilia-Romagna region, about 36 kilometres (22 miles) north of the city of Bologna, on 20 May at 04:03 local time (02:03 UTC). The epicentre was between Finale Emilia, Bondeno and Sermide. Two aftershocks of magnitude 5.2 occurred, one approximately an hour after the main event and another approximately eleven hours after the main event. Seven people were killed.

A magnitude 5.8 earthquake struck the same area nine days later, on 29 May, causing an additional twenty deaths and widespread damage, particularly to buildings already weakened by the 20 May earthquake. The epicentre was in Medolla: the quake itself occurred at a depth of about 10 kilometres (6.2 mi).

== Tectonic setting ==
The Po Plain, a foreland basin formed by the downflexing of the crust by the loading of the Apennine thrust sheets, overlies and mainly conceals the active front of the Northern Apennines fold and thrust belt, across which there is about one millimeter (0.04 in) per year of active shortening at present. Information from hydrocarbon exploration demonstrates that the area is underlain by a series of active thrust faults and related folds, some of which have been detected from anomalous drainage patterns. These blind thrust faults are roughly WNW–ESE trending, parallel to the mountain front, and dip shallowly towards the south-southwest. Several damaging historical earthquakes, such as the 1570 Ferrara earthquake, have occurred in the area.

== Earthquake sequence ==
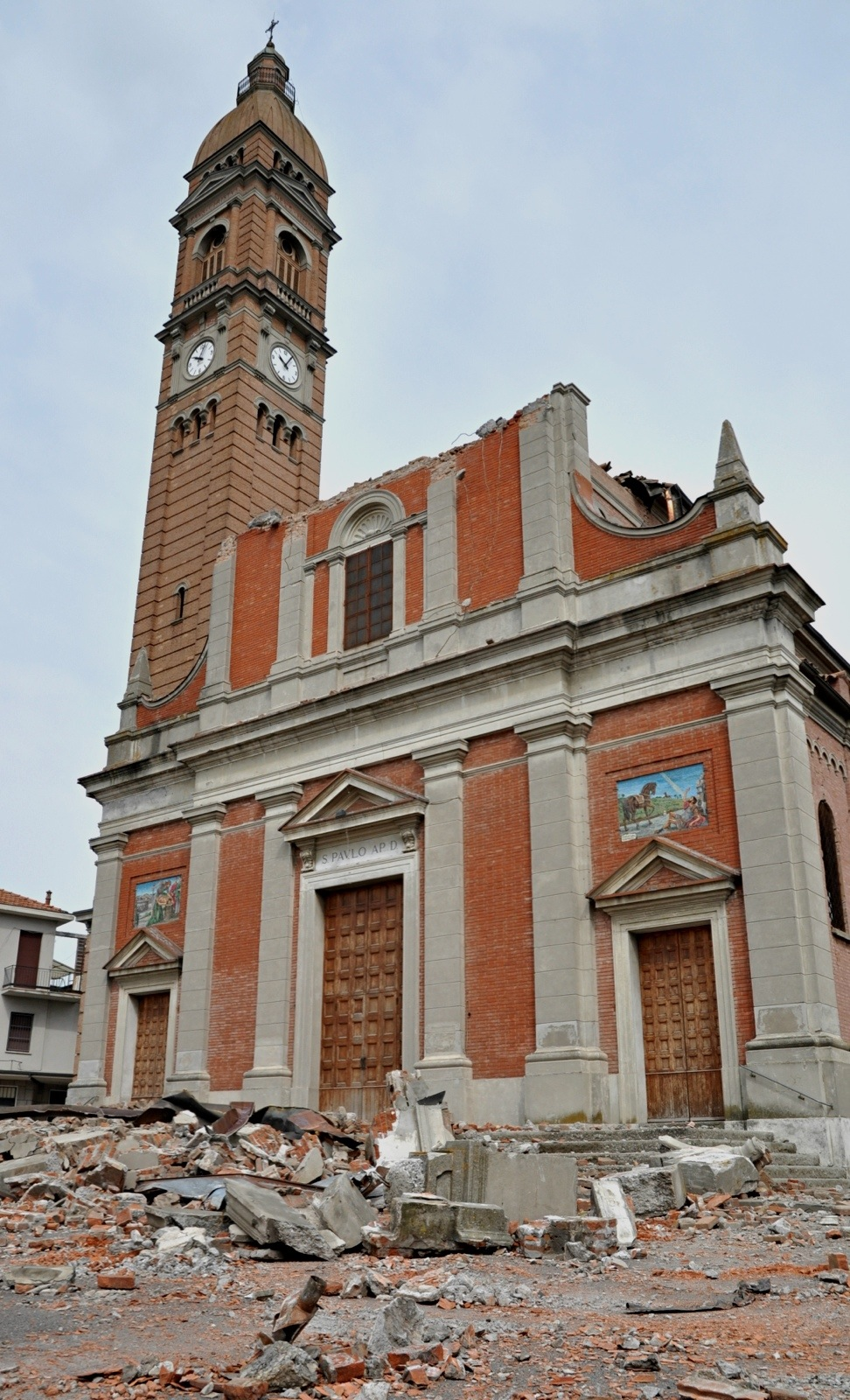
The damaged church of Saint Paul in Mirabello, Ferrara.

The 20 May earthquake sequence began with a magnitude 4.0 foreshock at 01:13 local time (23:13 UTC 19 May). Less than three hours later, at 04:04 local time (02:04 UTC) the biggest of these earthquakes occurred with magnitude 6.1 between Finale Emilia (province of Modena) and Sant'Agostino (province of Ferrara). This strong quake destroyed all the churches and many of the factories in the area. Seven people were killed. In San Carlo more than 350 families lost their houses. Within the next nine days, there were six aftershocks exceeding magnitude 5, 28 of magnitude 4–5 and 139 of magnitude 3–4. The mainshock could be felt as far away as Switzerland. The focal mechanism indicates that the earthquake was a result of thrust faulting, with a north–south direction of compression, on a fault plane trending west–east. This type of faulting is consistent with the regional tectonic setting.

On 29 May (about 09:00 CEST, 07:00 UTC), a magnitude 5.8 earthquake hit the same area. The hypocentre has been estimated at 5–10 kilometres (3–6 mi) below Mirandola. A series of two or three, according to different sources, strong aftershocks with magnitudes larger than 5 occurred at between 12:55 and 13:02 local time. The 09:00 shock and the 13:00 shocks were felt throughout Northern Italy, up to the Aosta province. The 09:00 earthquake was also felt in Austria, Switzerland, Slovenia and Croatia, with reports of swaying buildings in Austria. The two large aftershocks at 12:55 and 13:02 could also be felt in Austria. This earthquake had a similar mechanism to the 20 May shock.

This earthquake, like the previous earthquake of 20 May, was distinctly felt in Trentino Alto Adige. It was especially felt on the upper floors of buildings both in Trento and Bolzano, and created some concern among residents.

Sequence of shocks
Date	CEST	Mw	I	Depth (km)	Region
20 May	04:03:53	6.1	VII	10	Finale Emilia
29 May	09:00:03	5.8	VII	5	Medolla–Cavezzo
29 May	12:55:56	5.5	VI	2	San Possidonio–Mirandola
European-Mediterranean Seismological Centre

On 6 June at 06:08 local time, a magnitude 4.5 earthquake hit 50 km further east with an epicenter off the coast of Ravenna in Romagna at a depth 25.6 km. The earthquake was felt strongly and distinctly in Ravenna and Rimini, then less in Pesaro and Ancona, and very slightly in the province of Modena, in areas already affected by earthquakes in recent days. This earthquake was generated by a fault other than that responsible for the earthquakes of 20 and 29 May in Emilia, although part of the same group of geological structures.

== Damage ==
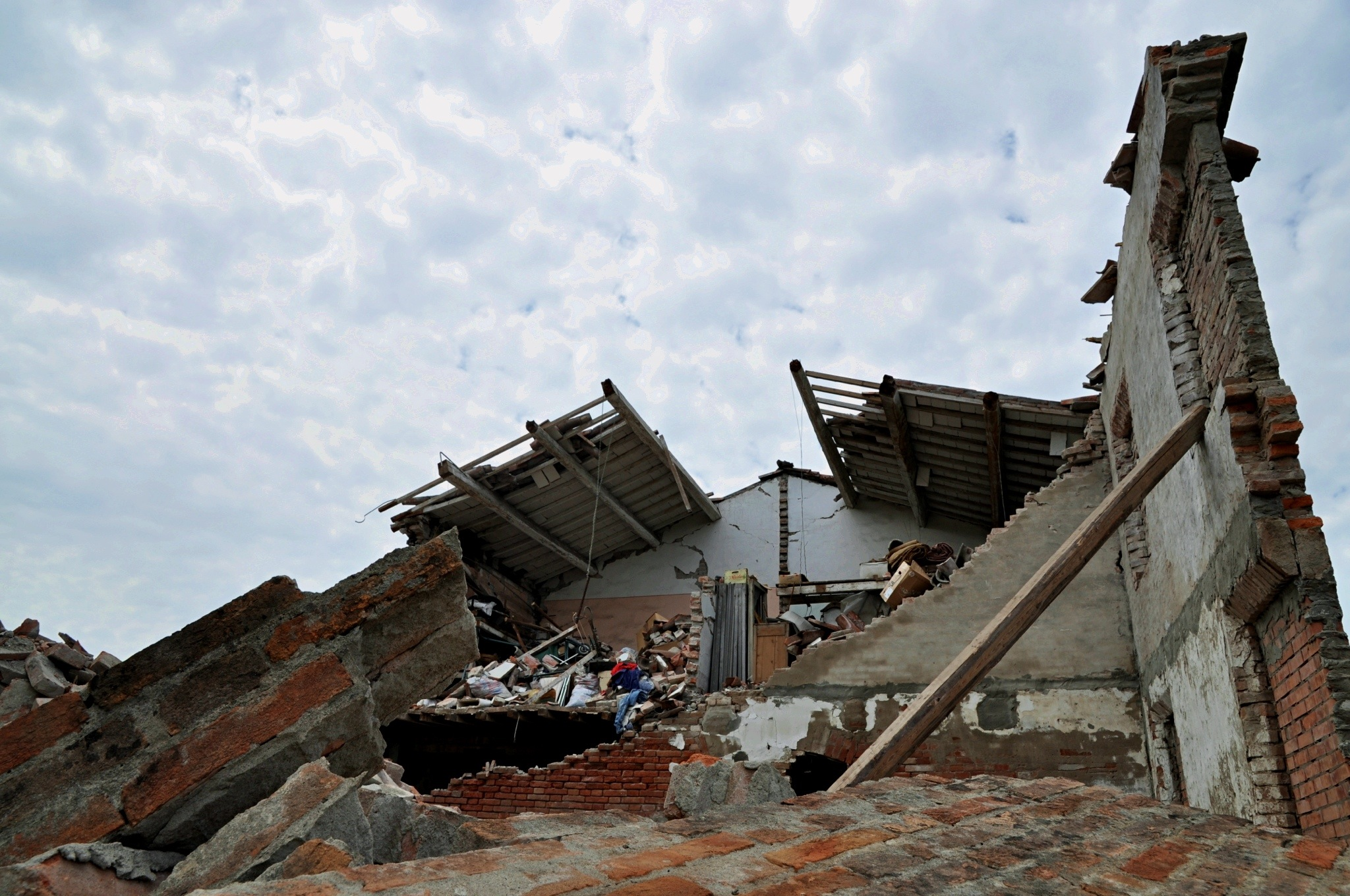
A destroyed house in Cento

Initial reports after the 20 May shock listed seven dead, including four workers at a factory in Ferrara, and about 5,000 people left homeless. At least 100 structures of historical significance have been damaged or destroyed. Many churches in towns around the epicentre suffered damage. One of the towers of Castello Estense, a moated medieval structure in the centre of Ferrara, was damaged in the earthquake. Half of a clock tower in Finale Emilia dating from the 13th century (known as the torre dei modenesi) fell down in the mainshock and the remaining part collapsed completely during an aftershock later that day. There was also significant damage to factories and agricultural land in the region.

Production of Grana Padano and Parmigiano-Reggiano hard cheeses was badly affected; approximately 300,000 wheels, with an estimated value of €200 million, were destroyed.

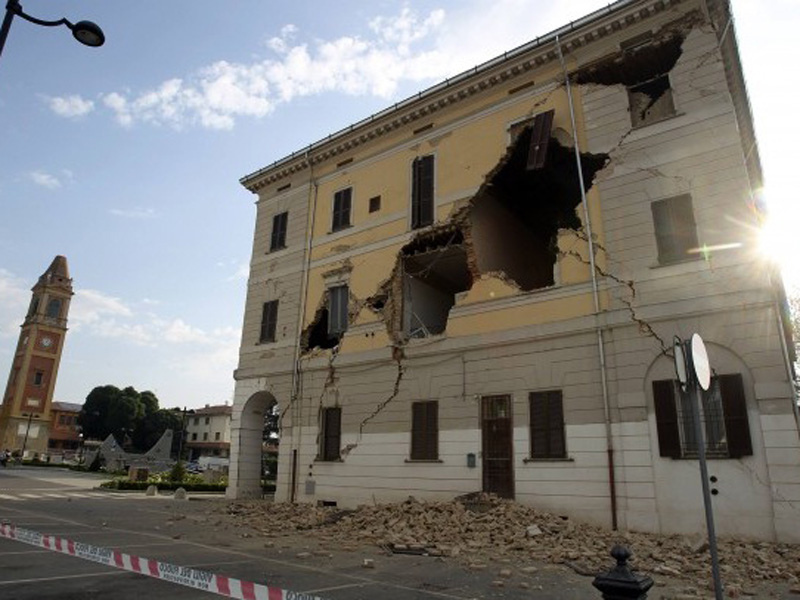
The damaged town hall of Sant'Agostino.

Five of the deaths were caused by the collapse of recently constructed factory buildings. Stefano Gresta, president of the National Institute of Geophysics and Volcanology, deemed it "unacceptable that modern constructions such as warehouses and industrial sheds have collapsed in an earthquake which was strong, but not exceptional". The area was not included in seismic hazard maps until 2003, when, after a reassessment, it was classified as "medium risk", with a 10% likelihood of such an earthquake in the next 450 years. A law introduced in 2006 imposed building standards appropriate for the seismic hazard classification, but few of the older buildings have been upgraded to meet these requirements.

The 29 May magnitude 5.8 earthquake left 18 people dead, more than 350 injured, and more than 15,000 homeless. The roof of the 15th-century cathedral of Mirandola, already damaged on 20 May, collapsed after the 29 May shock. The earthquake was felt in most of Northern Italy, triggering evacuation of schools and other buildings. Some buildings in the Modena province and neighbouring areas, already damaged in the first earthquake, collapsed.

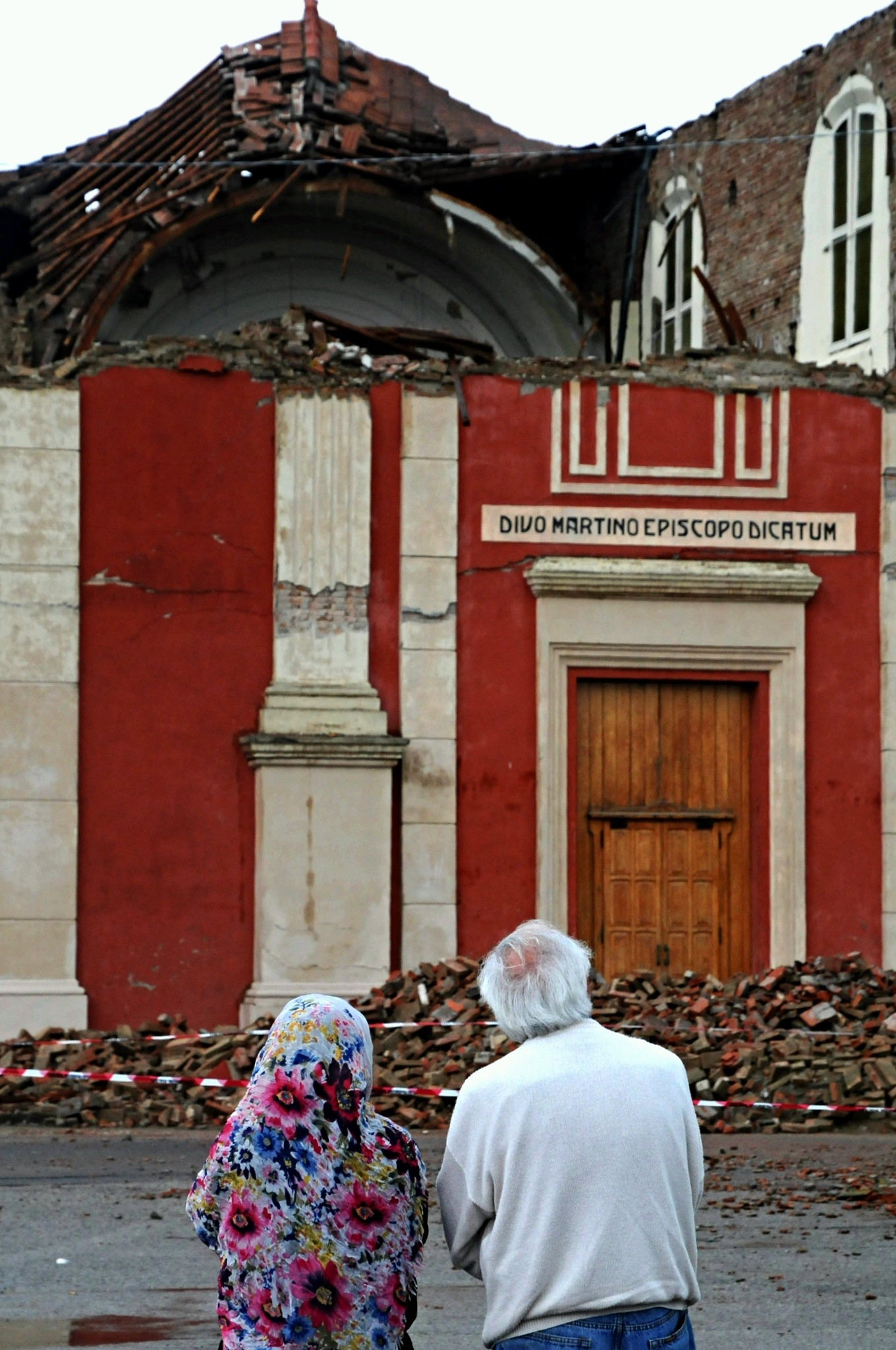
The damaged church of Saint Martin of Tours in Cento, Ferrara.

After the mainshock of 20 May, inspections were underway to determine which buildings were safe to reenter. The 29 May earthquake occurred during the daytime, when many people were working. As in the mainshock of 20 May, many of the dead in the 29 May earthquake were workers inside huge warehouses and factories. A local union representative has demanded an investigation to determine who was responsible for permitting the companies to resume operations.

Both the 20 and 29 May events caused damage to the neighbouring provinces of Bologna, Reggio Emilia, Rovigo and Mantua, where parts of the ducal palace were damaged.

An aftershock on the 3 June was felt throughout Northern Italy and caused the collapse of the 18th century clock tower in Novi di Modena, already imperilled by the earthquake of recent days.

The earthquake damage in Emilia "could exceed 4 billion" according to the vice-president of Confindustria Emilia-Romagna, Gaetano Maccaferri, who released these figures in testimony before the Senate Committee on Industry.

== See also ==
- List of earthquakes in 2012
- List of earthquakes in Italy
