= Sermide e Felonica =

Sermide e Felonica Sèrmad e Flonga (Emilian)
- Comune
- Comune di Sermide e Felonica
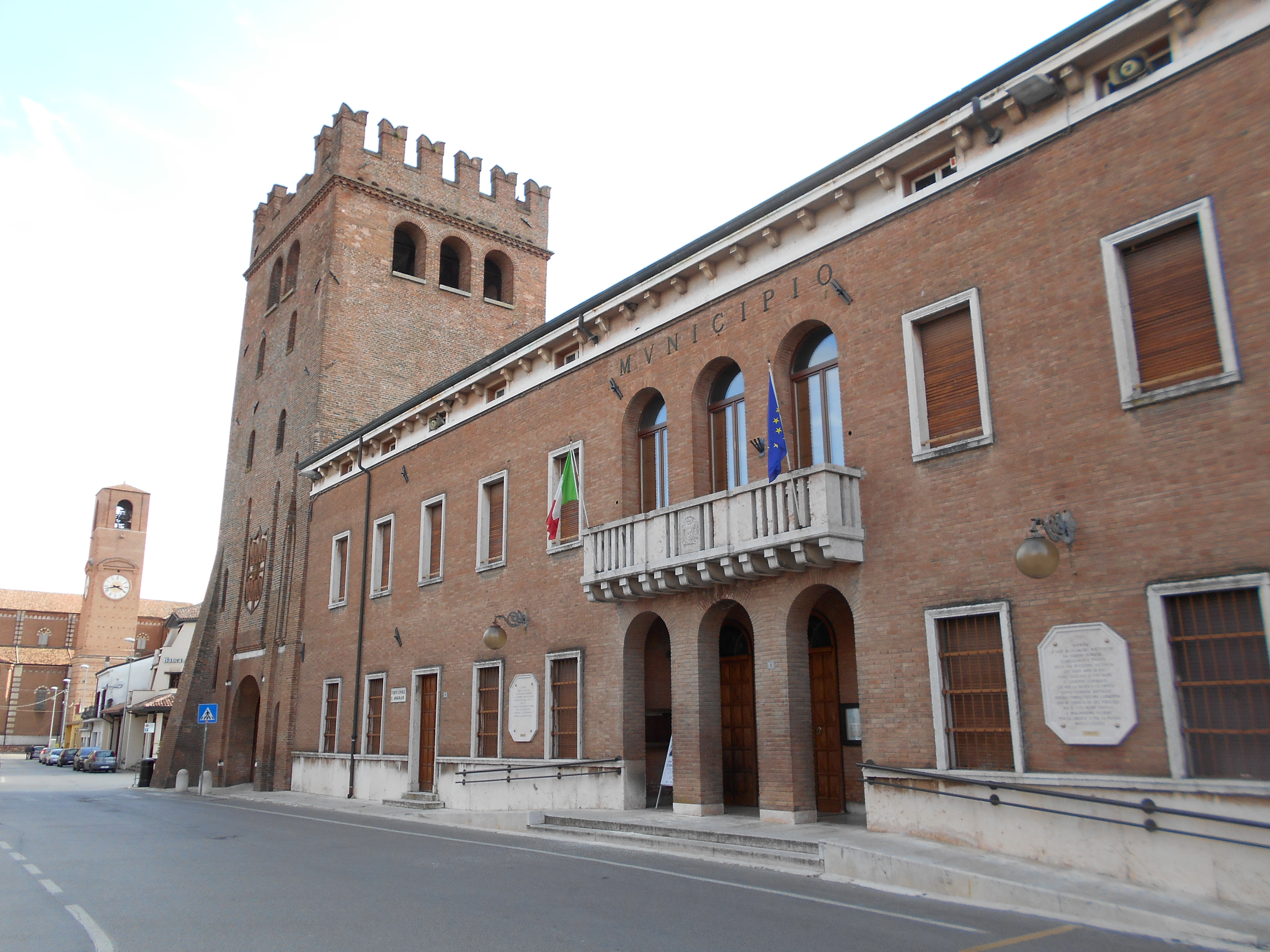
- Town hall, at Sermide.

- Location within Italy Location within Lombardy
- Coordinates: 44°59′21.11″N 11°19′6.43″E
- Country: Italy
- Region: Lombardy
- Province: Mantua (MN)
- Frazioni: Sermide, Felonica

Area
  - Total: 79.83 km^{2} (30.82 sq mi)

Population (31 July 2017)
  - Total: 7,383
  - Density: 92.48/km^{2} (239.5/sq mi)
- Time zone: UTC+1 (CET)
  - Summer (DST): UTC+2 (CEST)
- Postal code: 46028
- Dialing code: 0386
- Patron saint: St.Mary
- Saint day: May 31
- Website: Official website

Sermide e Felonica (Lower Mantovano and Ferrarese: Sèrmad e Flonga) is a comune in the Province of Mantua. It was created in 2017 after the merger of Sermide and Felonica.
