= Finale Emilia =

- Comune
- Comune di Finale Emilia
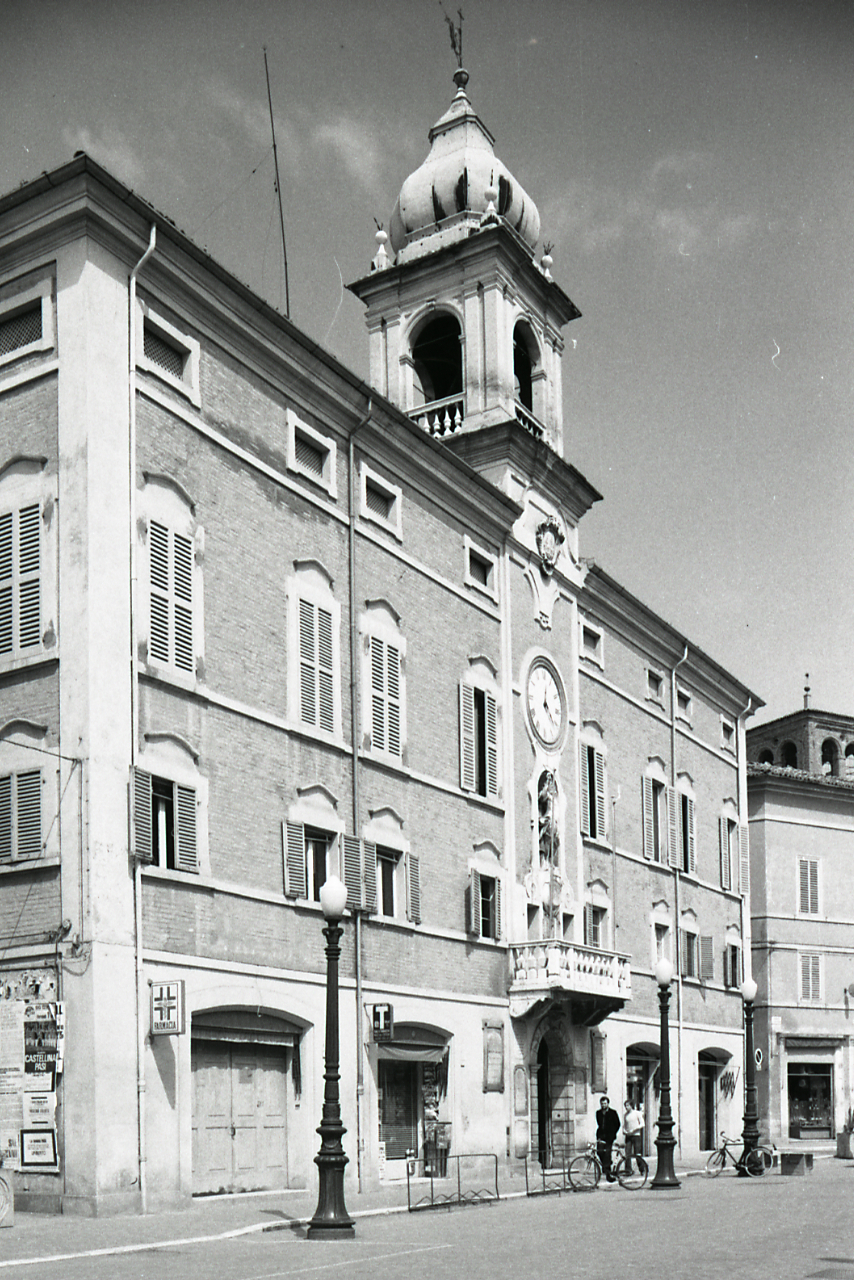
- The town hall in 1976.

- Flag Coat of arms

- Location within Italy Location within Emilia-Romagna
- Coordinates: 44°50′N 11°17′E
- Country: Italy
- Region: Emilia-Romagna
- Province: Modena (MO)
- Frazioni: Massa Finalese, Canaletto, Reno Finalese, Casumaro

Government
  - Mayor: Claudio Poletti

Area
  - Total: 105.13 km^{2} (40.59 sq mi)
- Elevation: 15 m (49 ft)

Population (31 August 2017)
  - Total: 15,573
  - Density: 148.13/km^{2} (383.66/sq mi)
- Demonym: Finalesi
- Time zone: UTC+1 (CET)
  - Summer (DST): UTC+2 (CEST)
- Postal code: 41034
- Dialing code: 0535
- Patron saint: Saint Zeno of Verona
- Saint day: 8 September
- Website: Official website

Finale Emilia (Finalese: Al Finàl; Modenese: Al Finèl) is a comune (municipality) in the Province of Modena, in the Italian region Emilia-Romagna, located about 35 kilometres (22 mi) north of Bologna and about 35 kilometres (22 mi) northeast of Modena.

Finale was struck by an earthquake on 20 May 2012, which destroyed or damaged several historical structures, such as the Torre dei Modenesi (a clock tower), and most of both the local castle and cathedral.

== Main sights ==
- Torre dei Modenesi (remains)
- Castello delle Rocche, also known as Rocca Estense, built in 1402 by will of Niccolò III of Este, marquis of Ferrara. It has a quadrangular plan with for towers and a central keep (originally built by Boniface III of Tuscany in medieval times). It is currently under restoration after the 2012 earthquake.

== Twin towns ==
- Grézieu-la-Varenne, France
- Villa Sant'Angelo, Italy
- Formigine, Italy

== People ==
- Jean-Baptiste Ventura (1794–1858) - general in Punjab Kingdom
- Gregorio Agnini (1856–1945) - founder member of Italian Socialist Party
- Giuseppe Pederiali (1937–2013) - writer
