= Terre del Reno =

- Comune
- Comune di Terre del Reno
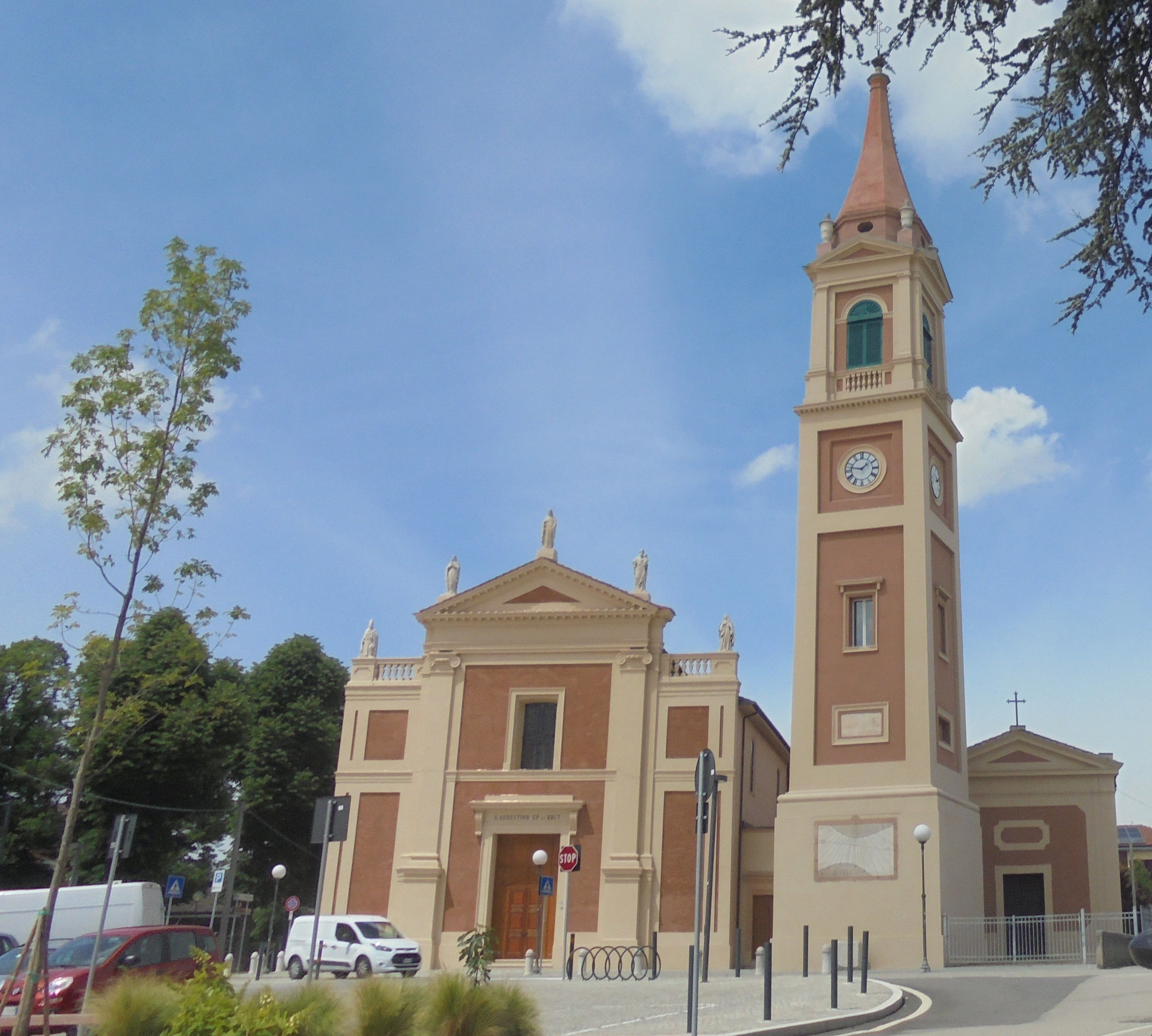
- Church of Saint Augustine in Terre del Reno

- Flag Coat of arms

- Location within Italy Location within Emilia-Romagna
- Country: Italy
- Region: Emilia-Romagna
- Province: Province of Ferrara (FE)
- Frazioni: Mirabello, Sant'Agostino, Dosso, Roversetto, San Carlo

Government
  - Mayor: Roberto Lodi

Population (Jan. 2017)
  - Total: 10,041
- Time zone: UTC+1 (CET)
  - Summer (DST): UTC+2 (CEST)
- Dialing code: 051 and 0532

Terre del Reno (Tèr dal Raggn in the native Emilian language) is a new comune (municipality) in the Province of Ferrara in the Italian region Emilia-Romagna. As of 1 January 2017, it has a population of 10.041.

Terre del Reno borders the following municipalities: Bondeno, Cento, Galliera, Pieve di Cento (BO), Poggio Renatico, Vigarano Mainarda.

The new municipality, from 1 January 2017, was made from the union of Mirabello and Sant'Agostino.
