= Sermide =

- Frazione
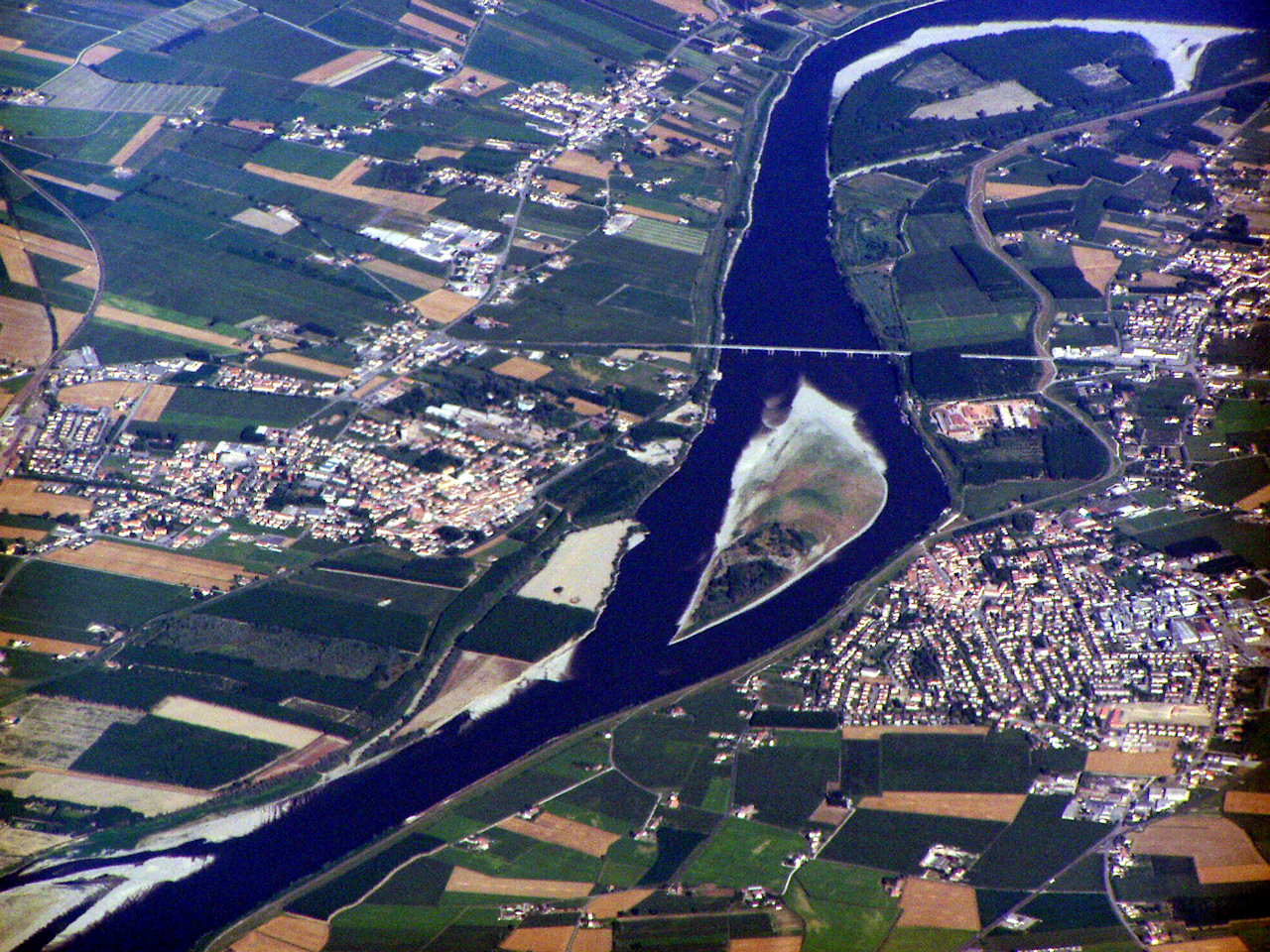
- Sermide on the left

- Location of Sermide in Italy
- Coordinates: 45°0′N 11°18′E
- Country: Italy
- Region: Lombardy
- Province: Province of Mantua (MN)
- Comune: Sermide e Felonica

Area
  - Total: 56.9 km^{2} (22.0 sq mi)
- Elevation: 13 m (43 ft)

Population (Dec. 2004)
  - Total: 6,533
  - Density: 115/km^{2} (297/sq mi)
- Demonym: Sermidesi
- Time zone: UTC+1 (CET)
  - Summer (DST): UTC+2 (CEST)
- Postal code: 46028
- Dialing code: 0386

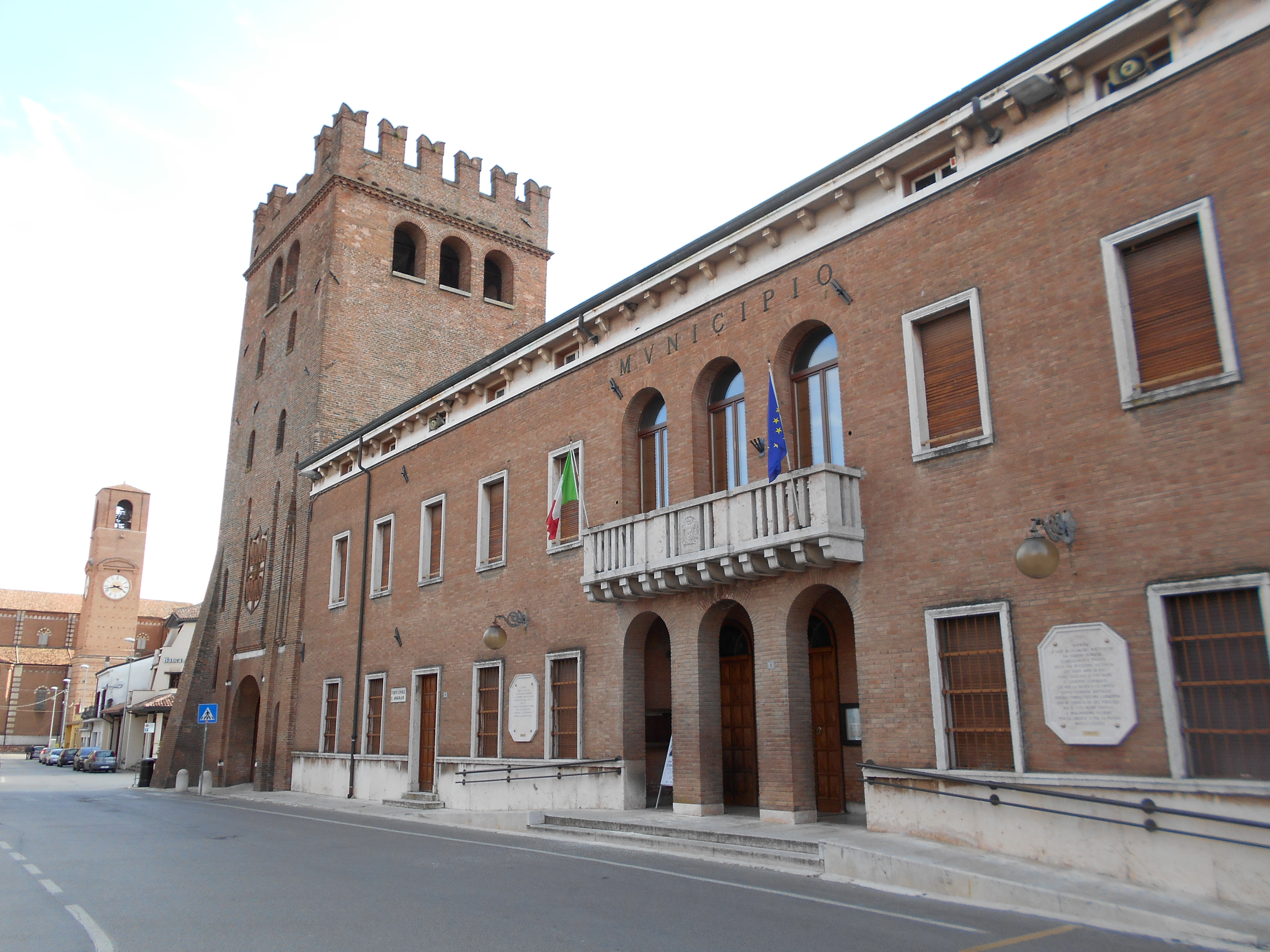
town hall

Sermide was a comune (municipality) in the Province of Mantua in the Italian region Lombardy, located about 180 kilometres (110 mi) southeast of Milan and about 45 kilometres (28 mi) southeast of Mantua. It is now a frazione of Sermide e Felonica since 2017.
