= Emilian language =

Unstandardized language spoken in Emilia, Italy

Emilian
- emigliân, emigliàn, emigliän
- Pronunciation: IPA: [emiˈʎa(ː)ŋ] or [emiˈʎæːŋ]
- Native to: Italy
- Region: Primarily Emilia-Romagna. Border variants spoken in near Lombardy, Tuscany and Veneto's provinces.
- Language family: Indo-European: Italic; Latino-Faliscan; Latinic; Romance; Italo-Western; Western Romance; Gallo-Iberian?; Gallo-Romance; Gallo-Italic; Emilian–Romagnol; Emilian
- Dialects: Bolognese; Ferrarese; Mantuan; Parmesan
- Writing system: Latin

Language codes
- ISO 639-3: egl
- Glottolog: emil1241
- Linguasphere: 51-AAA-oka ... -okh
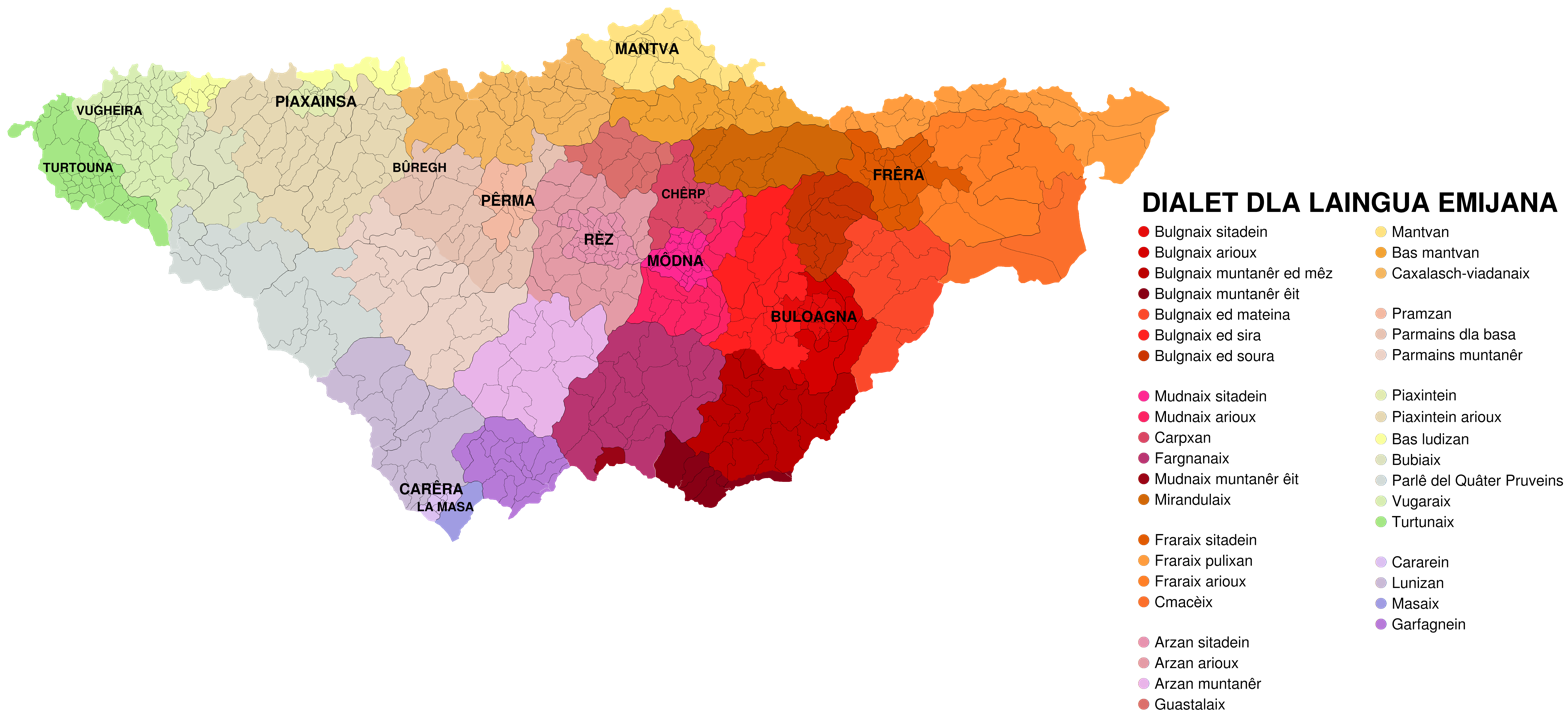

- Emilian is classified as Definitely Endangered by UNESCO Atlas of the World's Languages in Danger

Emilian (Reggiano, Parmesan and Modenese: emigliân; Bolognese: emigliàn; Piacentino: emigliän; Italian: emiliano) is a Gallo-Italic unstandardised language spoken in the historical region of Emilia, which is now in the western part of Emilia-Romagna.

Emilian has a default word order of subject–verb–object and both grammatical gender (masculine and feminine) and grammatical number (singular and plural). There is a strong T–V distinction, which distinguishes varying levels of politeness, social distance, courtesy, familiarity or insult. The alphabets, of which there are multiple, largely adapted from the Italian (Tuscan) one, generally use a considerable number of diacritics.

== Classification ==
Emilian is a Gallo-Italic language. Besides Emilian, the Gallo-Italic family includes Romagnol, Piedmontese, Ligurian and Lombard, all of which maintain a level of mutual intelligibility with Emilian.

=== Dialectal varieties ===
The historical and geographical fragmentation of Emilian communities, divided in many local administrations (as signorie then duchies, with reciprocal exchanges of land), has caused a high dialectal fragmentation, to the point the existence of an Emilian koiné has been questioned.

Linguasphere Observatory recognises the following dialects:

- Mantuan, spoken in all but the very north of the Province of Mantua in Lombardy. It has a strong Lombard influence.
- Vogherese (Pavese-Vogherese), spoken in the Province of Pavia in Lombardy. It is closely related phonetically and morphologically to Piacentine. It is also akin to Tortonese.
- Piacentine, spoken west of the River Taro in the Province of Piacenza and on the border with the province of Parma. The variants of Piacentine are strongly influenced by Lombard, Piedmontese, and Ligurian.
- Parmesan, spoken in the Province of Parma. Those from the area refer to the Parmesan spoken outside Parma as Arioso or Parmense, although today's urban and rural dialects are so mixed that only a few speak the original. The language spoken in Casalmaggiore in the Province of Cremona to the north of Parma is closely related to Parmesan.
- Reggiano (Arzân), spoken in the Province of Reggio Emilia, although the northern parts (such as Guastalla, Luzzara and Reggiolo) of the province are not part of this group and closer to Mantuan.
- Modenese, spoken in the centre of the Province of Modena, although Bolognese is more widespread in the Castelfranco area.
- Mirandolese, spoken in the northern part of the Province of Modena, it is very different from the Modenese dialect in the phonology, grammar and vocabulary.
- Bolognese, spoken in all the Metropolitan City of Bologna but the Romagnol comuni of: Imola, Dozza, Borgo Tossignano, Fontanelice, Castel del Rio, Mordano and Casalfiumanese (all beyond the river Santerno); in around Castelfranco Emilia (Modena); in the Province of Ferrara (Cento, Poggio Renatico, Sant'Agostino and Mirabello) and in Pavana (Province of Pistoia, Tuscany).
- Ferrarese, spoken in the Province of Ferrara (except for Cento and surroundings), southern Veneto, and Comacchio.

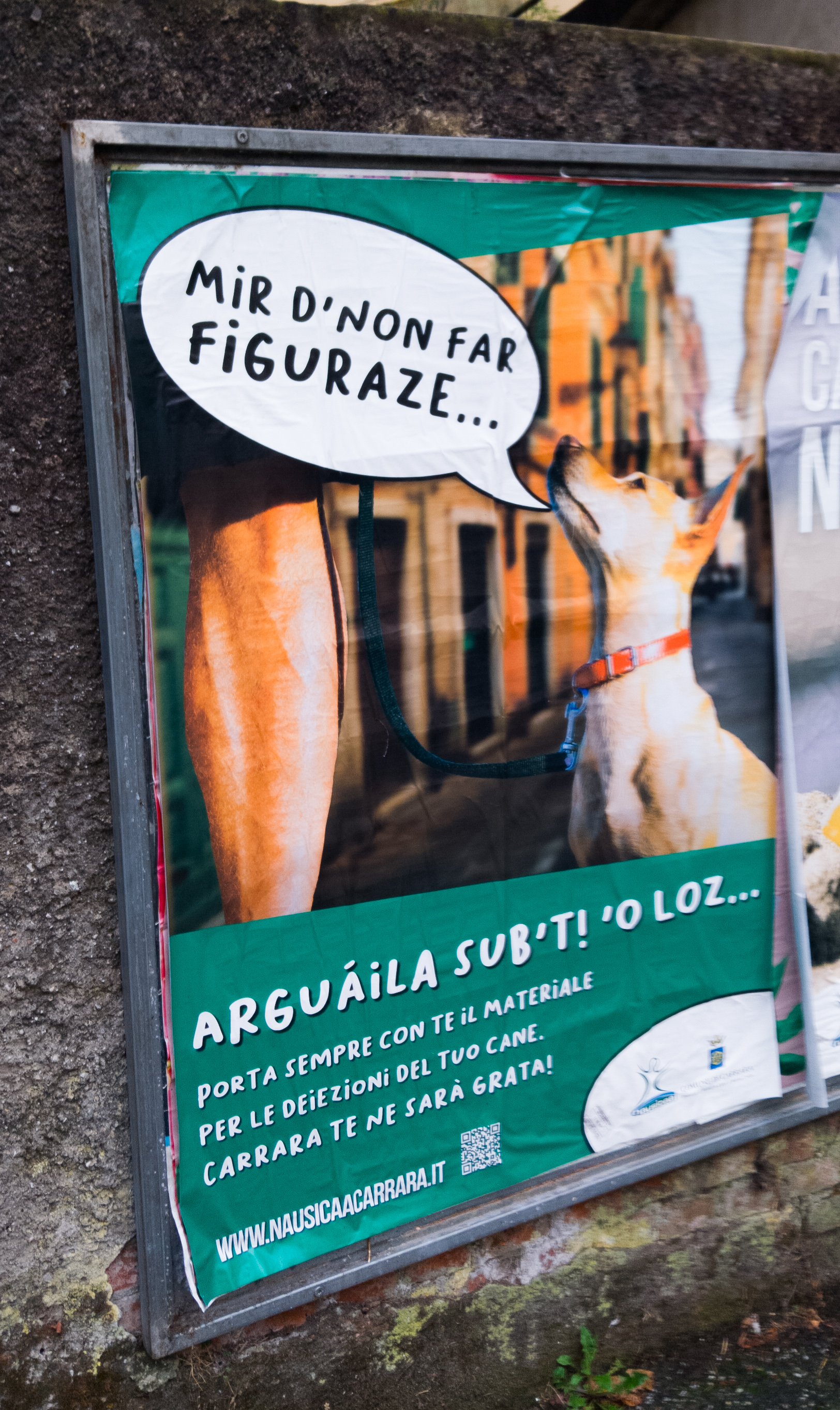
Poster in Carrarese dialect

- Carrarese and Lunigiano dialects, spoken in Carrara, Lunigiana, in almost all of the Province of Massa-Carrara in northwestern Tuscany, and a good portion of the Province of La Spezia in eastern Liguria. Historically, this region has been part of Tuscany and the duchies of Modena and Parma at different times, so it has a close economic relationship with the Emilian area and is geographically proximate due to the Magra and Vara rivers.

Other definitions include the following:

- Massese (mixed with some Tuscan features)
- Casalasco, spoken in Casalmaggiore, Lombardy.
- Comacchiese, as distinct from Ferrarese

== Vocabulary ==
There is no widespread standard orthography. Several major urban dialects will be compared with each other, with respective local orthographies and relative pronunciations.

Words in Emilian
| Bologna dialect | IPA | Ferrara dialect | IPA | Modena dialect | IPA | Parma dialect | IPA | Piacenza dialect | IPA | Reggio Emilia dialect | IPA | Italian | English |
|---|---|---|---|---|---|---|---|---|---|---|---|---|---|
| èlt | [ˈɛ̙ːlt] | alt | [ˈaɫt] | êlt | [ˈɛːlt] | ält | [ˈɛ̌lt] | ält | [ˈælt] | êlt | [ˈɛ̝ːlt] | alto | tall, high |
| lóng | [ˈlo̘ŋɡ] | lungh | [ˈɫuŋɡ] | lóngh, lángh | [ˈloŋɡ], [ˈlɐŋɡ] | lóngh | [ˈlõ̌ŋɡ] | lòngh | [ˈlɔ̃ɡ] | lòng | [ˈlɒŋɡ] | lungo, (lento) | long, slow |
| lèr(e)g | [ˈlɛ̙ːr(e̙)ɡ] | largh | [ˈɫarɡ] | lêr(e)gh | [ˈlɛːr(e)ɡ] | lärogh | [ˈlɛ̌ːʁɔɡ] | lärag | [ˈlæːʁɐɡ] | lêregh | [ˈlɛ̞ːreɡ] | largo | wide |
| tôr, a tûg/a tói | [ˈto̘ːr], [ɐ ˈtu̘ːɡ, ɐ ˈto̘j] | tór, a tógh | [ˈtoːr], [ɐ ˈtoːɡ] | tōr, a tōgh | [ˈtoːr], [ɐ ˈtoːɡ] | tór, a tógh | [ˈtǒːʁ], [ɐ ˈtǒːɡ] | tör, a tög | [ˈtoːʁ], [ɐ ˈtoːɡ] | tōr, a tōgh | [ˈtoːr], [ɐ ˈtoːɡ] | prèndere, prendo | to take, I take |
| dîr, a dégg, la dîṡ | [ˈdi̙ːr], [ɐ ˈde̙ɡː], [lɐ ˈdi̙ːz̠] | dir, a digh, la dis | [ˈdiːr], [ɐ ˈdiːɡ], [ɫɐ ˈdiːz̠] | dîr, a dégh, la dîś | [ˈdiːr], [ɐ ˈdeɡː], [lɐ ˈdiːz̠] | dir, a diggh, la diz | [ˈdǐːʁ], [ɐ ˈdīɡ(ː)], [lɐ ˈdǐːz̠] | dir, a digg, la diś | [ˈdiːʁ], [ɐ ˈdiɡː], [lɐ ˈdiːz̠] | dîr, a dégh, la dîş | [ˈdiːr], [ɐ ˈdeɡː], [lɐ ˈdiːz̠] | dire, dico, dice | to say, I say, she says |
| incû | [iŋˈku̘ː] | incuó | [iŋˈkwo] | incō | [iŋˈkoː] | incò | [ĩŋˈkɔ̄] | incö | [ĩˈko] | incō | [iŋˈkoː] | oggi | today |
| såul | [ˈs̠ʌwl] | sól | [ˈs̠oːɫ] | sōl | [ˈs̠oːl] | sól | [ˈs̠ǒːl] | sul | [ˈs̠uːl] | sòul | [ˈs̠oːl], [ˈs̠ɒwl] | sole | sun |
| lóṅna | [ˈlo̘ŋnɐ] | luna | [ˈɫuːnɐ] | lòuna | [ˈlɔwnɐ] | lón’na | [ˈlǒŋnɐ] | löina | [ˈlõjnɐ] | lòuna | [ˈlɒwnɐ] | luna | moon |
| pass | [ˈpɐs̠ː] | péss | [ˈpeːs̠] | páss | [ˈpɐs̠ː] | pess | [ˈpɛ̄s̠(ː)] | pëss | [ˈpos̠ː] | pès | [ˈpæs̠ː] | pesce | fish |
| | [] | | [] | | [] | | [] | | [] | | [] | | |

Names of months in Emilian
| Bologna dialect | IPA | Ferrara dialect | IPA | Modena dialect | IPA | Parma dialect | IPA | Piacenza dialect | IPA | Reggio Emilia dialect | IPA | Italian | English |
|---|---|---|---|---|---|---|---|---|---|---|---|---|---|
| al maiṡ, i mîṡ | [ɐl ˈmɐjz̠], [i ˈmi̙ːz̠] | al més, i mis | [ɐɫ ˈmeːz̠], [i ˈmiːz̠] | al mēś, i mēś | [ɐl ˈmeːz̠], [i ˈmeːz̠] | al méz, i méz | [ɐl ˈměːz̠], [i ˈměːz̠] | al méś, i méś | [ɐl ˈmeːz̠], [i ˈmeːz̠] | al mèiş, i mèiş | [ɐl ˈmæjz̠], [i ˈmæjz̠] | il mese, i mesi | the month, the months |
| żnèr | [ˈðnɛ̙ːr] | znar | [ˈðnaːr] | źnêr | [ˈz̪nɛːr] | znär | [ˈz̠nɛ̌ːʁ] | śnär | [ˈz̠næːʁ] | şnêr | [ˈz̠næːr] | gennaio | January |
| febrèr | [febˈrɛ̙ːr] | favrar | [fɐvˈraːr] | fervêr | [fɛrˈvɛːr] | farvär | [fɐʁˈvɛ̌ːʁ] | farvär | [fɐʁˈvæːʁ] | fervêr | [ferˈvæːr] | febbraio | February |
| mèrz | [ˈmɛ̙ːrθ] | marzz | [ˈmarθ] | mêrz | [ˈmɛːrs̪] | märs | [ˈmɛ̌ʁs̠] | märs | [ˈmæʁs̠] | mêrs | [ˈmæːrs̠] | marzo | March |
| avréll | [ɐvˈre̙lː] | avril | [ɐvˈriːɫ] | avrîl | [ɐvˈriːl] | avril | [ɐvˈʁǐːl] | avril | [ɐvˈʁiːl] | avrîl | [ɐvˈriːl] | aprile | April |
| mâż | [ˈmɐʌ̯ð] | maz | [ˈmaːð] | mâź | [ˈmaːz̪] | maz, mag’ | [ˈmǎːz̠], [ˈmǎːdʒ] | magg’ | [ˈmadːʒ] | mâş, mâg | [ˈmaːz̠], [ˈmaːdʒ] | maggio | May |
| żóggn | [ˈðo̘ɲː] | zugn | [ˈðuːɲ] | źógn | [ˈz̪oɲː] | zuggn | [ˈz̠ūɲ(ː)] | śügn, giügn | [ˈz̠yɲː], [ˈdʒyɲː] | şógn | [ˈz̠oɲː] | giugno | June |
| lói | [ˈlo̘jː] | luj | [ˈɫuːj] | lój | [ˈlojː] | lujj | [ˈlūj(ː)] | lüjj | [ˈlyjː] | lój | [ˈlojː] | luglio | July |
| agåsst | [ɐˈɡɐs̠ːt] | agóst | [ɐˈɡoːs̠t] | agást | [ɐˈɡɐs̠ːt] | agosst | [ɐˈɡɔ̄s̠t] | agust | [ɐˈɡus̠ːt] | agòst | [ɐˈɡɒs̠ːt] | agosto | August |
| setàmmber | [s̠eˈtɐmːber] | setembar | [s̠eˈtembɐr] | setámber | [s̠eˈtɐmber] | setémbor | [s̠eˈtẽ̌mbɔʁ] | setémbar | [s̠eˈtẽbɐʁ] | setèmber | [s̠eˈtæmber] | settembre | September |
| utåbber | [uˈtɐbːer] | utóbar | [uˈtoːbɐr] | utōber | [uˈtoːber] | otòbbor | [oˈtɔ̄b(ː)ɔʁ] | utùbbar | [uˈtubːɐʁ] | ůtòber | [ʊˈtɒbːer] | ottobre | October |
| nuvàmmber | [nuˈvɐmːber] | nuvémbar | [nuˈvembɐr] | nuvámber | [nuˈvɐmber] | novémbor | [noˈvẽ̌mbɔʁ] | nuvémbar | [nuˈvẽbɐʁ] | nůvèmber | [nʊˈvæmber] | novembre | November |
| dṡàmmber | [ˈdʒɐmːber] | dsémbar, dizzémbar | [ˈdz̠embɐr], [diˈθembɐr] | diciámber | [diˈtʃɐmber] | dzémbor, dicémbor | [ˈdz̠ẽ̌mbɔʁ], [diˈtʃẽ̌mbɔʁ] | dśémbar | [ˈdz̠ẽbɐʁ] | dicèmber | [diˈtʃæmber] | dicembre | December |

Numbers in Emilian
| Bologna dialect | IPA | Ferrara dialect | IPA | Modena dialect | IPA | Parma dialect | IPA | Piacenza dialect | IPA | Reggio Emilia dialect | IPA | Italian | English |
|---|---|---|---|---|---|---|---|---|---|---|---|---|---|
| ón, ónna | [ˈo̘ŋ], [ˈo̘nːɐ] | un, una | [ˈuŋ], [ˈuːnɐ] | ûn, óna | [ˈuːn], [ˈonːɐ] | vón, vunna | [ˈvȭ(ŋ)], [ˈvūn(ː)ɐ] | vöin, vünna | [ˈvõj], [ˈvynːɐ] | ûn, óna | [ˈuːn], [ˈonːɐ] | uno, una | one (m., f.) |
| dû, dåu | [ˈdu̘ː], [ˈdʌw] | du, dó | [ˈdu], [ˈdo] | dû, dō | [ˈduː], [ˈdoː] | du, dò | [ˈdū], [ˈdɔ̄] | dü, du | [ˈdy], [ˈdu] | dû, dòu | [ˈduː], [ˈdɒw, ˈdoː] | due | two (m., f.) |
| trî, trai | [ˈtri̙ː], [ˈtrɐj] | tri, tré | [ˈtri], [ˈtre] | trî, trē | [ˈtriː], [ˈtreː] | tri, trè | [ˈtʁī], [ˈtʁɛ̄] | tri, tré | [ˈtʁi], [ˈtʁe] | trî, trèi | [ˈtriː], [ˈtræj] | tre | three (m., f.) |
| quâter | [ˈkwɐʌ̯ter] | quàtar | [ˈkwaːtɐr] | quâter | [ˈkwaːter] | cuàtor | [ˈkwǎːtɔʁ] | quàttar | [ˈkwatːɐʁ] | quâter | [ˈkwaːter] | quattro | four |
| zénc | [ˈθe̙ŋk] | zzinch | [ˈθiŋk] | zînch | [ˈs̪iːŋk] | sinch | [ˈs̠ǐŋk] | sëincu | [ˈs̠ə̃jku] | sînch | [ˈs̠iːŋk] | cinque | five |
| sî | [ˈs̠i̙ː] | sié | [ˈs̠je] | sē | [ˈs̠eː] | séz | [ˈs̠ěːz̠] | séś | [ˈs̠eːz̠] | sē | [ˈs̠eː] | sei | six |
| sèt | [ˈs̠ɛ̙ːt] | set | [ˈs̠ɛːt] | sêt | [ˈs̠ɛːt] | sett | [ˈs̠ɛ̄t(ː)] | sett | [ˈs̠e̞tː] | sèt | [ˈs̠ætː] | sette | seven |
| òt | [ˈɔ̘ːt] | ot | [ˈɔːt] | ôt | [ˈɔːt] | ot | [ˈɔ̌ːt] | ott | [ˈɔtː] | ôt | [ˈɔːt] | otto | eight |
| nôv | [ˈno̘ːv] | nóv | [ˈnoːv] | nōv | [ˈnoːv] | nóv | [ˈnǒːv] | növ | [ˈnoːv] | nōv | [ˈnoːv] | nove | nine |
| dîṡ | [ˈdi̙ːz̠] | diés | [ˈdjez̠] | dēś | [ˈdeːz̠] | déz | [ˈděːz̠] | déś | [ˈdeːz̠] | dēş | [ˈdeːz̠] | dieci | ten |

== Phonology ==
=== Consonants ===
Consonants in plains dialects of Emilian (dialect of Bologna used as reference)
| | | Labial | Dental | Alveolar | Palatal (-alveolar) | Velar |
|---|---|---|---|---|---|---|
| Stop/ affricate | voiceless | p | t | | t͡ʃ | k |
| Stop/ affricate | voiced | b | d | | d͡ʒ | ɡ |
| Fricative | voiceless | f | θ | s | | |
| Fricative | voiced | v | ð | z | | |
| Sonorant | nasal | m | | n | ɲ | ŋ |
| Sonorant | median | | | r | j | w |
| Sonorant | lateral | | | l | ʎ | |

Consonants in mountain dialects of Emilian (dialect of Lizzano in Belvedere used as reference)
| | | Labial | Dental | Alveolar | Post-alv. | Palatal | Velar |
|---|---|---|---|---|---|---|---|
| Stop/ affricate | voiceless | p | t | t͡s | t͡ʃ | c | k |
| Stop/ affricate | voiced | b | d | d͡z | d͡ʒ | ɟ | ɡ |
| Fricative | voiceless | f | | s | ʃ | | |
| Fricative | voiced | v | | z | ʒ | | |
| Nasal | | m | | n | | ɲ | (ŋ) |
| Rhotic | | | | r | | | |
| Approximant | central | | | | | j | w |
| Approximant | lateral | | | l | | (ʎ) | |

- /ŋ/, while present as an allophone of /n/ before velars in most to all varieties, is only phonemic in certain dialects, including those of Bologna, Ferrara, and (debatably) Parma, where it can occur word-finally and contrast with /n/.
- The phonemes /ʃ, ʒ, c, ɟ/ are present in many dialects of the Apennines, but they are generally absent in dialects native to the plains. Their regular correspondences in plains dialects are, respectively, /s, z, t͡ʃ, d͡ʒ/.
- /t, d/ are dental [t̪, d̪]. On the other hand, /s, z/ are retracted alveolar [s̠, z̠].
- In the dialects in and around Ferrara, /l/ is strongly velarized [ɫ]. In the dialects of the mountains of the provinces of Modena and Bologna, /l/ is vocalized to [j] in coda position before labials and velars, similarly to what happens in Romagnol. Some dialects go even further and vocalize all instances of coda /l/.
- Affricate sounds /t͡s, d͡z/ can also be heard in place of the fricative sounds /θ, ð/ particularly among southern dialects, and are in fact the more conservative realization. West of Modena (including the dialects of Carpi and Sassuolo), as well as in Comacchio, /θ, ð/ merge with /s, z/ as [s̠, z̠].
- In the dialects of the provinces of Piacenza and Parma, an /r/ sound can be heard as either an alveolar trill [r], or as a uvular fricative [ʁ] sound. This realization is most widespread in and around Fidenza (PR).
- /ʎ/ can be analysed as an allophone of the sequence /lj/, as it alternates with /li/ and only ever occurs before a vowel. The sequence /nj/ is also often realized as [ɲ]; however, the phonemic status of /ɲ/ is undisputed, as it can also occur word-finally and before other consonants.

=== Vowels ===
Vowels vary greatly across different Emilian varieties, to the point where even the amount of vowels can range from as few as 7 (as in the dialect of Ferrara) to as many as 23 (as in the dialect of Valestra, RE).

In most dialects belonging to the Central Emilian subgroup (provinces of Reggio Emilia, Modena, and Bologna), vowel length is distinguished for the following vowels [iː eː ɛː aː ɔː oː uː]. There, after a short stressed vowel, the consonant is allophonically lengthened (but not doubled, as in Italian), e.g. /ˈmeːl/ [ˈmeːl] "honey", /ˈmel/ [ˈmelː] "thousand". In Western Emilian dialects (provinces of Piacenza and Parma), vowel length is neutralized word-finally, which has led dialectologists to analyse those dialects as having consonant length as the contrastive feature instead. Length contrasts have been receding in Parma in favour of pitch distinctions. No length distinctions of any kind are found in the dialect of Ferrara, in continuity with the bordering Venetian. The dialect of Comacchio, however, shows a contrast between monophthongs and diphthongs, analogous to that present in Western Romagnol.

==== Vowels in the urban dialect of Bologna ====
| | Front | Central | Back |
|---|---|---|---|
| Close | i iː | | u uː |
| Close-mid | e eː | | o oː |
| Open-mid | ɛ ɛː | | ɔ ɔː |
| Open | | a aː | |
| Diphthongs | | ai̯ | ʌu̯ |

- In unstressed position, only /a, e, i, o, u/ can occur. In stressed position, all 16 vowels are found. /ɛ/ and /ɔ/ only occur in recent unadapted Italian borrowings.
- Short vowels /i e ɛ a ɔ o u/ are normally realized as centralized [i̙ e̙ ɛ̙ ɐ ɔ̘ o̘ u̘]. Similarly, long vowels tend to be realized as diphthongs in which the first component is the centralized short counterpart, and the second is the non-centralized vowel. /aː/ is generally pronounced [ɐʌ̯].
- Until relatively recently, there were two additional phonemes, generally represented by ä /æ/ and å /ʌ/. Those have both merged with /a/ into [ɐ] in the urban dialect, but they are still distinguished outside the city walls and, regardless of variety, follow different patterns when it comes to vowel reduction and metaphony: ä reduces to /i/ when unstressed and is raised to /e/ under metaphony, while å reduces to /u/ and is raised to /o/ in the same conditions.

==== Vowels in the Parma dialect ====
| | Front | Central | Back |
|---|---|---|---|
| Close | i | | u |
| Close-mid | e | | o |
| Open-mid | ɛ | | ɔ |
| Open | | a | |

- All seven vowels occur and contrast in accentual position. In non-accentual position, /e/ and /ɛ/ are in complementary distribution, as are /o/ and /ɔ/: only close-mid vowels [e, o] appear before the accent, and only open-mid vowels [ɛ, ɔ] appear after it.
- The older generation maintains a contrast in consonant length that directly affects vowel length – accented short vowels occur before lengthened consonants and word-finally, and long vowels occur before unlengthened consonants. Long vowels are accompanied by a rise in pitch (or a fall in pitch in imperatives), while short vowels are accompanied by a flat pitch. In younger speakers of the urban dialect, these length distinctions are largely lost or applied inconsistently, making pitch-accent phonemic.
- Unaccented /a/ is often reduced to [ɐ], as is typical of Emilian varieties.
- Various dialects of the province show front rounded vowels /y/ and /ø/ in place of urban /u/ and /o/ (from Latin ŏ in open syllables), as well as /u/ in place of /o/ (from Latin ō), in continuity with the dialects in the province of Piacenza.

==== Vowels in the Piacenza dialect ====
| | Front | | Central | Back |
| | Unrounded | Rounded | Central | Back |
|---|---|---|---|---|
| Close | i | y | | u |
| Close-mid | e | (ø) | (ə) | o |
| Open-mid | ɛ | (ø) | (ə) | ɔ |
| Open | æ | | a | |

- Nasal equivalents of most vowels - /ã, ɛ̃, ẽ, ĩ, ɔ̃, õ, ũ, ỹ/, as well as the nasal diphthongs /ə̃i̯, õi̯/ are also present. The nasal diphthongs are often de-nasalized by urban speakers.
- Rounded front vowel sounds /y, ø, œ/ and a mid-central vowel sound /ə/ all occur, in various capacities, in the province of Piacenza. The urban dialect retains /y/, but merges the rest of these sounds into /o/.
- In unstressed position, /a, e, i, o, u, y/ occur. /e/ and /o/ are rare in those positions and are typically found in recent loanwords.

== Writing system ==
Emilian is written using a Latin script that has never been standardised, and spelling varies widely among the dialects.

The dialects were largely oral and rarely written until some time in the late 20th century; a large amount of written media in Emilian has been created since World War II.

== Bibliography ==
- Colombini, F. (2007). La negazione nei dialetti emiliani: microvariazione nell'area modenese (MA thesis). University of Padua.
- Rognoni, Luca (2013). "Il sistema fonologico del dialetto modenese". L'Italia dialettale: rivista di dialettologia italiana. Vol. 74. pp. 135–148. ISBN 9788846739957.
