= Mirabello, Emilia–Romagna =

Mirabello
- Frazione
- Location of Mirabello in Italy
- Coordinates: 44°49′N 11°28′E
- Country: Italy
- Region: Emilia-Romagna
- Province: Ferrara (FE)
- Comune: Terre del Reno

Area
  - Total: 16.1 km^{2} (6.2 sq mi)
- Elevation: 15 m (49 ft)

Population (Dec. 2004)
  - Total: 3,407
  - Density: 212/km^{2} (548/sq mi)
- Demonym: Mirabellesi
- Time zone: UTC+1 (CET)
  - Summer (DST): UTC+2 (CEST)
- Postal code: 44043
- Dialing code: 0532

Mirabello is a frazione of the comune (municipality) of Terre del Reno in the Province of Ferrara in the Italian region of Emilia-Romagna, located about 35 kilometres (22 mi) north of Bologna and about 12 kilometres (7 mi) west of Ferrara.

It was a separate comune until 1 January 2017
