= Groppo =

Groppo may refer to:

- Groppo (surname), Italian surname
- Groppo (music), in music a specific type of cadential trill
- Groppo, Riolunato, a frazione of the Riolunato municipality, Modena province, Italy
- Groppo Trail, a single engine, tandem seat, high wing ultralight Italian aircraft

== See also ==
- Gruppo (disambiguation)
- Punto a groppo, type of lace made without bobbins
