= Biagio =

Biagio is an Italian male given name. It may also refer to:

== People ==
- Biagio (archbishop), Archbishop of Torres
- Biagio Antonacci, Italian singer-songwriter
- Biagio Betti, Italian painter
- Biagio Black, American painter
- Biagio Brugi, Italian jurist
- Biagio Ciotto, American politician
- Biagio d'Antonio, Italian painter
- Biagio Falcieri, Italian painter
- Biagio Marin, Italian poet
- Biagio Marini, Italian violinist
- Biagio Messina, American filmmaker and TV producer
- Biagio Pelligra, Italian actor
- Biagio Pupini, Italian painter
- Biagio Rebecca, Italian painter
- Biagio Rossetti, Italian architect
- Luigi Di Biagio, Italian soccer player
- Saint Blaise, known in Italy as San Biagio
- Vlaho Getaldić, Croatian writer also known as Biagio Ghetaldi

== Places ==
- Monte San Biagio, Italian town
- San Biagio, Venice, church in Venice, Italy
- San Biagio della Cima, Italian village
- San Biagio di Callalta, Italian town
- San Biagio Platani, Italian village
- San Biagio Saracinisco, Italian village
