= Calavorno =

- Frazione
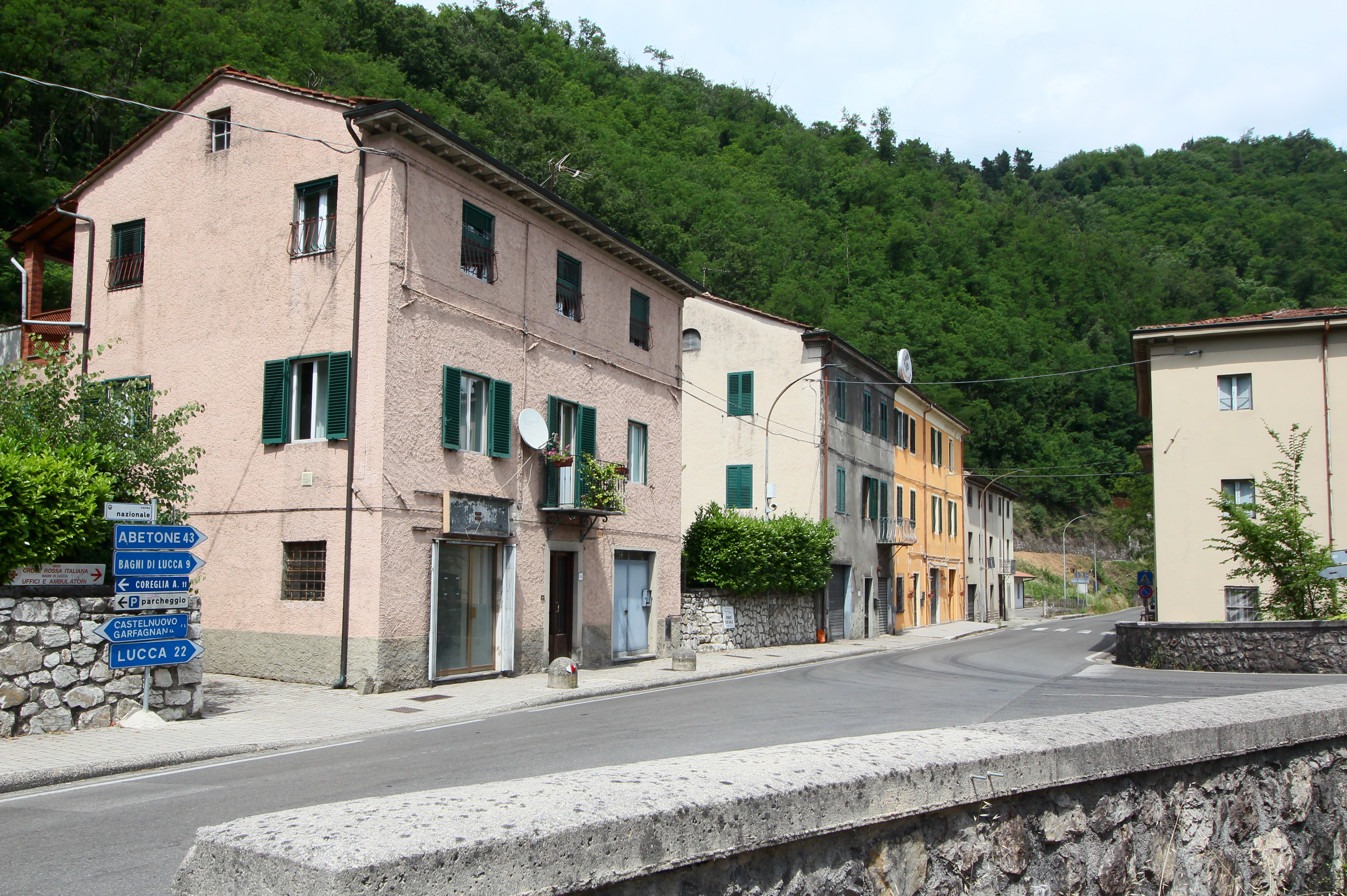

- Location of Calavorno in Italy
- Coordinates: 44°1′17″N 10°31′47″E
- Country: Italy
- Region: Tuscany
- Province: Lucca (LU)
- Comune: Coreglia Antelminelli
- Elevation: 119 m (390 ft)

Population
  - Total: 325
- Time zone: UTC+1 (CET)
  - Summer (DST): UTC+2 (CEST)
- Postal code: 55025
- Dialing code: (+39) 0583

Calavorno is a village in Tuscany, central Italy, administratively a frazione of the comune of Coreglia Antelminelli, province of Lucca.

Calavorno is about 26 km from Lucca and 10 km from Coreglia Antelminelli.

== Bibliography ==
- Emanuele Repetti (1833). "Calavorno (Calavurna)". Dizionario geografico fisico storico della Toscana (in Italian). Vol. 1. Florence. p. 383.
