= Lama Mocogno =

- Comune
- Comune di Lama Mocogno
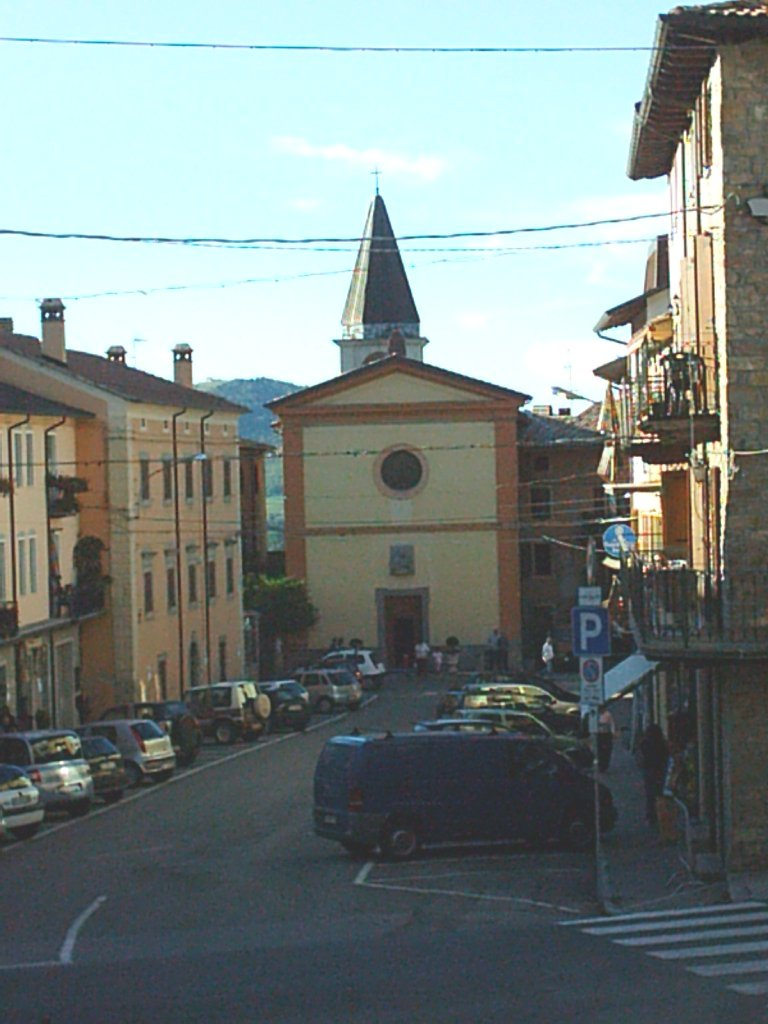

- Coat of arms

- Location within Italy Location within Emilia-Romagna
- Coordinates: 44°18′N 10°44′E
- Country: Italy
- Region: Emilia-Romagna
- Province: Modena (MO)
- Frazioni: Barigazzo, Borra, Cadignano, La Santona, Mocogno, Montecenere, Piane di Mocogno, Pianorso, Sassostorno, Vaglio

Government
  - Mayor: Arnaldo Ricchi

Area
  - Total: 63.8 km^{2} (24.6 sq mi)
- Elevation: 842 m (2,762 ft)

Population (31 July 2015)
  - Total: 2,760
  - Density: 43.3/km^{2} (112/sq mi)
- Demonym: Lamèsi
- Time zone: UTC+1 (CET)
  - Summer (DST): UTC+2 (CEST)
- Postal code: 41023
- Dialing code: 0536
- ISTAT code: 036018
- Patron saint: Saint Lucy
- Saint day: December 13th
- Website: Official website

Lama Mocogno (Frignanese: La Lama) is a comune (municipality) in the Province of Modena in the Italian region Emilia-Romagna, located about 50 kilometres (31 mi) southwest of Bologna and about 40 kilometres (25 mi) southwest of Modena. The Monte Cimone is located nearby.

Lama Mocogno borders the following municipalities: Montecreto, Palagano, Pavullo nel Frignano, Polinago, Riolunato.
