= Biasio =

Biasio is a surname. Notable people with the surname include:

- Mélanie De Biasio (born 1978), Belgian jazz singer, flutist and compose
- Daniel A. DiBiasio, American academic administrator serving as the 11th president of Ohio Northern University

== See also ==
- Biagio (disambiguation)
