= Lake della Ninfa =

Lake in Emilia-Romagna, Italy

Lago della Ninfa
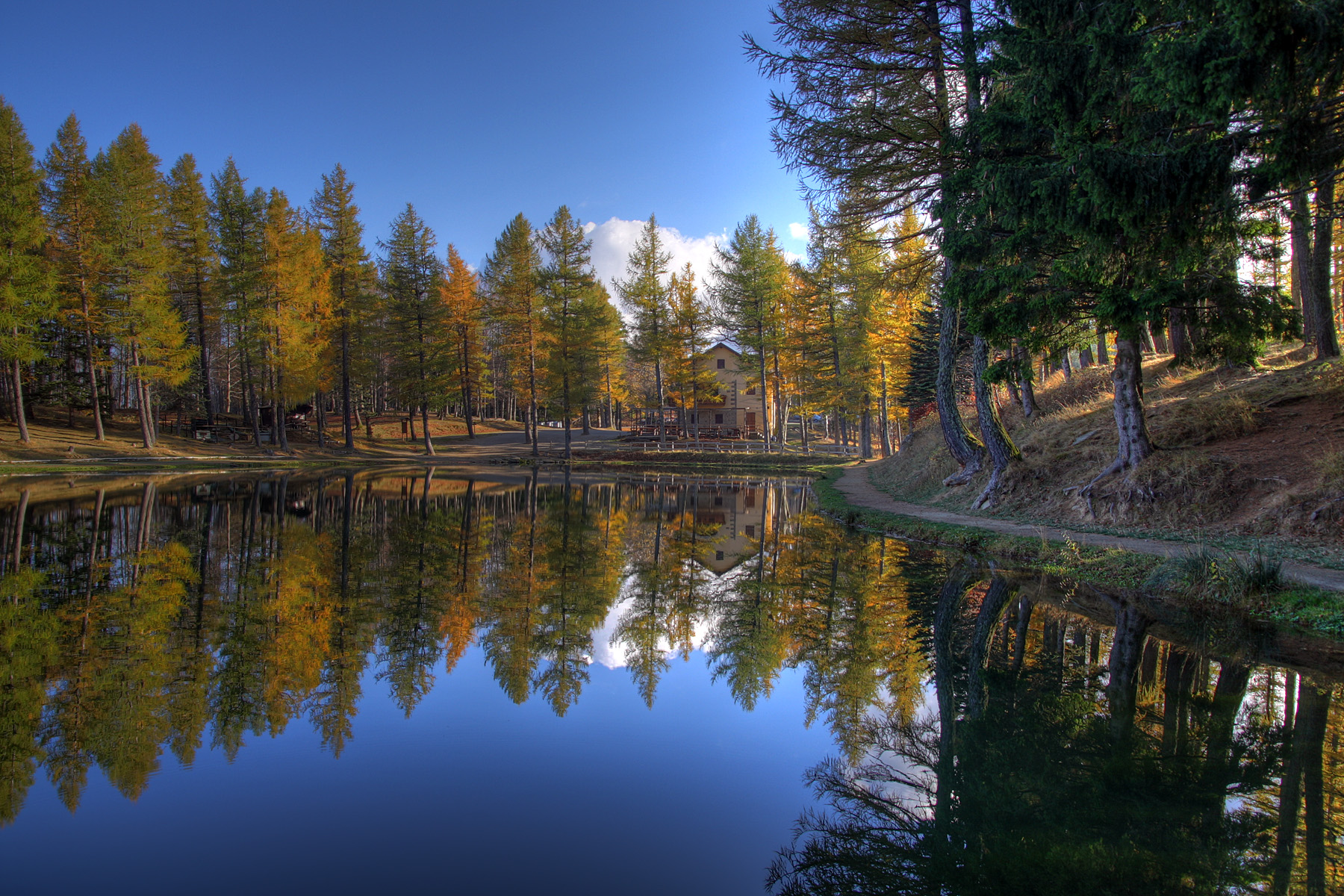
- Ninfa Lake in autumn
- Interactive map of Lago della Ninfa
- Location: Sestola, Province of Modena, Emilia-Romagna, Italy
- Coordinates: 44°12′39″N 10°43′30″E
- Type: Artificial lake, originally formed by a landslide
- Basin countries: Italy
- Surface area: 0.1536 km^{2} (0.0593 sq mi)
- Surface elevation: 1,500 m (4,900 ft)
- Settlements: Sestola

Lago della Ninfa is a lake that originated from a large landslide, now artificially maintained, located at 1,500 m (4,900 ft) altitude at the foot of Monte Cimone, in the municipality of Sestola, Province of Modena, Emilia-Romagna, Italy.

Once called Lago dei Budaloni, it took its current name from the refuge built on site in 1928, which referred to an ancient legend according to which a beautiful and wicked nymph lived in the lake, attracting hunters, shepherds, and travelers to drown them in the whirlpools she created in the waters.

The lake is now maintained artificially: to make it more attractive for tourism, the marsh vegetation at the bottom was removed, along with the thin natural silty-clay layer that waterproofed the bottom. This intervention caused the lake to drain. To remedy this, the bottom was asphalted, and the lake is artificially fed through a fountain to maintain a constant level.

It is surrounded by beech forests and coniferous woods, but in the past, the surrounding slopes were bare (as shown in some vintage postcards), with only a few ancient beech trees standing out, most of which were cut down during World War II by the Germans who needed wood during the occupation of Sestola. A surviving beech tree can still be admired near one of the adjacent refuges.

== Ski resort ==
Near the lake, there is an equipped ski resort belonging to the Cimone ski area. It consists of:

- a medium-difficulty alpine ski slope about 900 m (3,000 ft) long with a chairlift for ascent,
- a cross-country skiing track,
- a slope for children and beginners equipped with a moving walkway,
- a snow park for snowboarding,
- a paid baby park with inflatable games and a conveyor belt serving a small training field for children and a slope for descending with small rubber dinghies.
