= Coreglia Antelminelli =

- Comune
- Comune di Coreglia Antelminelli
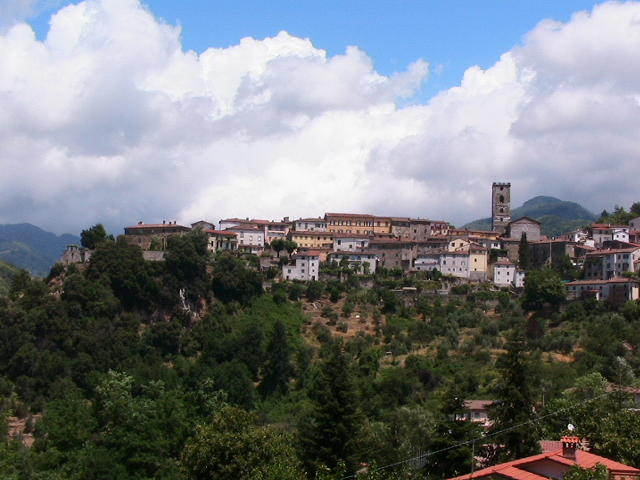

- Coat of arms

- Location within Italy Location within Tuscany
- Coordinates: 44°3′52″N 10°31′35″E
- Country: Italy
- Region: Tuscany
- Province: Lucca (LU)
- Frazioni: Calavorno, Ghivizzano, Gromignana, Lucignana, Piano di Coreglia, Tereglio, Vitiana

Government
  - Mayor: Valerio Amadei

Area
  - Total: 52.94 km^{2} (20.44 sq mi)
- Elevation: 595 m (1,952 ft)

Population (31 March 2017)
  - Total: 5,212
  - Density: 98.45/km^{2} (255.0/sq mi)
- Demonym: Coreglini
- Time zone: UTC+1 (CET)
  - Summer (DST): UTC+2 (CEST)
- Postal code: 55025
- Dialing code: 0583
- Website: Official website

Coreglia Antelminelli is a comune (municipality) in the Province of Lucca in the Italian region Tuscany, located about 70 kilometres (43 mi) northwest of Florence and about 25 kilometres (16 mi) north of Lucca.

Coreglia Antelminelli borders the following municipalities: Abetone Cutigliano, Bagni di Lucca, Barga, Borgo a Mozzano, Fiumalbo, Gallicano, Pievepelago. It is one of I Borghi più belli d'Italia ("The most beautiful villages of Italy").

== Main sights ==
- San Martino: Romanesque church built during 9th-10th-centuries
- Santi Pietro e Paolo: Romanesque church with interiors refurbished and frescoed in 19th-century
- Santa Maria Assunta: church contains a painted crucifix attributed to Berlinghiero Berlinghieri
