= Esperia alpine botanical garden =

Botanical garden in Sestola, Italy

Coordinates: 44.21592°N 10.72171°E

Esperia alpine botanical garden is a 3-hectare alpine botanical garden located at an elevation of 1500 meters at the Passo del Lupo, some 4 km from Sestola, Province of Modena, Emilia-Romagna, Italy. It is operated by the Club Alpino Italiano (CAI), Modena section.

The garden was first organized in 1952 as the Centro Erboristico Appenninico Sperimentale for the study of medicinal plants, grass, etc., and set within a natural beech forest at the foot of Monte Cimone. In 1980 it became today's botanical garden, and opened to the public. Its name, "Esperia", refers to the Garden of the Gods in Greek mythology.

Today the garden contains about 200 species of local and exotic plants, arranged in 32 flowerbeds, with a trail for the blind in Braille, and a section of medicinal plants. Of particular interest is the "Cimone roccera" which represents Cimone's sandstone and flora, and a pond containing crested newts.

== See also ==
- List of botanical gardens in Italy
