= Riolunato =

- Comune
- Comune di Riolunato
- Coat of arms

- Location within Italy Location within Emilia-Romagna
- Coordinates: 44°14′N 10°39′E
- Country: Italy
- Region: Emilia-Romagna
- Province: Modena (MO)
- Frazioni: Serpiano, Castello, Groppo, Castellino di Brocco, Centocroci.

Government
  - Mayor: Lorenzo Checchi

Area
  - Total: 45.2 km^{2} (17.5 sq mi)
- Elevation: 715 m (2,346 ft)

Population (31 May 2007)
  - Total: 734
  - Density: 16.2/km^{2} (42.1/sq mi)
- Time zone: UTC+1 (CET)
  - Summer (DST): UTC+2 (CEST)
- Postal code: 41020
- Dialing code: 0536
- Patron saint: James, son of Zebedee
- Saint day: 25 July
- Website: http://www.comune.riolunato.mo.it/

Riolunato (Riolunatese: Ardodlà) is a comune (municipality) in the Province of Modena in the Italian region Emilia-Romagna, located about 60 kilometres (37 mi) southwest of Bologna and about 50 kilometres (31 mi) southwest of Modena. It is overlooked from the south by the Monte Cimone. Its fraction Le Polle, about 1,300 metres (4,300 ft) high, is one of the most important stations in the Monte Cimone Ski resort.

Riolunato borders the following municipalities: Fiumalbo, Frassinoro, Lama Mocogno, Montecreto, Palagano, Pievepelago, Sestola.

== Traditions ==
"Maggio delle Ragazze" (May of the Girls). The event takes place every three years in two different moments. The first is during the night between 30 April and 1 May, and the second is usually the second Sunday of May. During the first part, the village's young men sing traditional refrains (hymns to spring and youth) in order to wish for a good season of prosperity and happiness.

== Twin towns ==
- Tórshavn, Faroe Islands

== See also ==
- Groppo (Riolunato)
