= Groppo, Riolunato =

Groppo
- Frazione
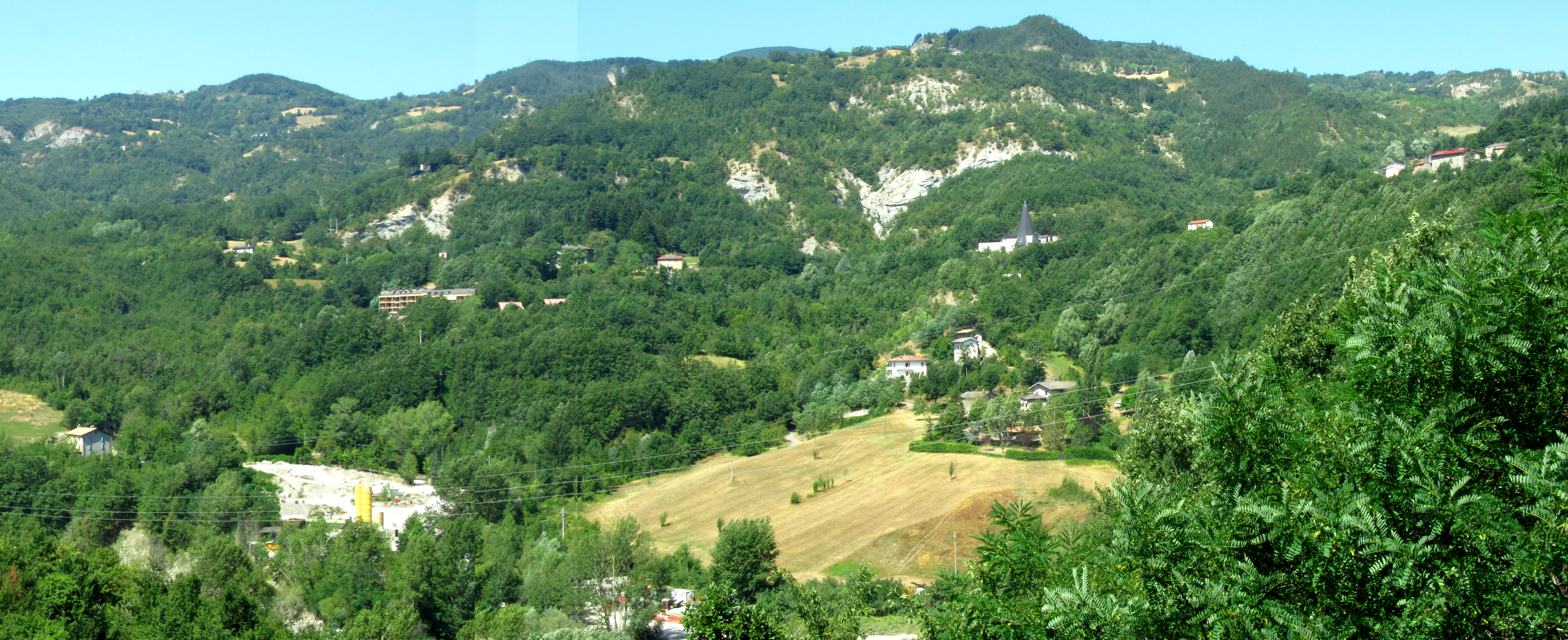

- Location of Groppo in Italy
- Country: Italy
- Region: Emilia-Romagna
- Province: Modena
- Comune: Riolunato
- Time zone: UTC+1 (CET)
  - Summer (DST): UTC+2 (CEST)
- Postal code: 41020
- Patron saint: St. Peter

Groppo is a district (frazione) of the Riolunato municipality (comune), located in Modena province, Emilia-Romagna region, Italy.

== Geography ==
Groppo is both an hamlet and a territory. The territory boundaries are: the Scoltenna creek (south-east); the Palagano territory, beyond the Giardini and Vandelli routes (north-west); the Pievepelago territory (south-west) and Roncombrellaro (north-east). As a territory, it includes Cabonargi and many other small inhabited areas and it is about 3 km^{2} wide.

== History ==
During the 15th century, Groppo was already a municipality, endowed with its own statutes. It became part of the municipality of Riolunato quite recently; in 1845 it was still part of the Pievepelago community, one of the five communities into which Frignano was divided (the others were Pavullo, Fanano, Sestola and Fiumalbo). In 1786–1787, a great landslide affected the town, reaching as far as the Scoltenna creek.

Notable natives of Groppo include Father Claudio Fini, famous in the second half of the sixteenth century as a theologian and preacher, a witness to the holiness of St. Aloysius Gonzaga; Saverio Cabonargi, a follower of Mazzini, who inspired the participation of the Frignanese mountain in the 1831 Modena revolution and Luigi Cabonargi (died 1852), a doctor in Rome and a friend of Stendhal.
