= San Giovanni Battista, Roncoscaglia =

Church building in Sestola, Italy

San Giovanni Battista is former-Roman Catholic parish church located in the frazione of Roncoscaglia in the Apennine hills above the town of Sestola in the province of Modena, region of Emilia-Romagna, Italy.

== History ==
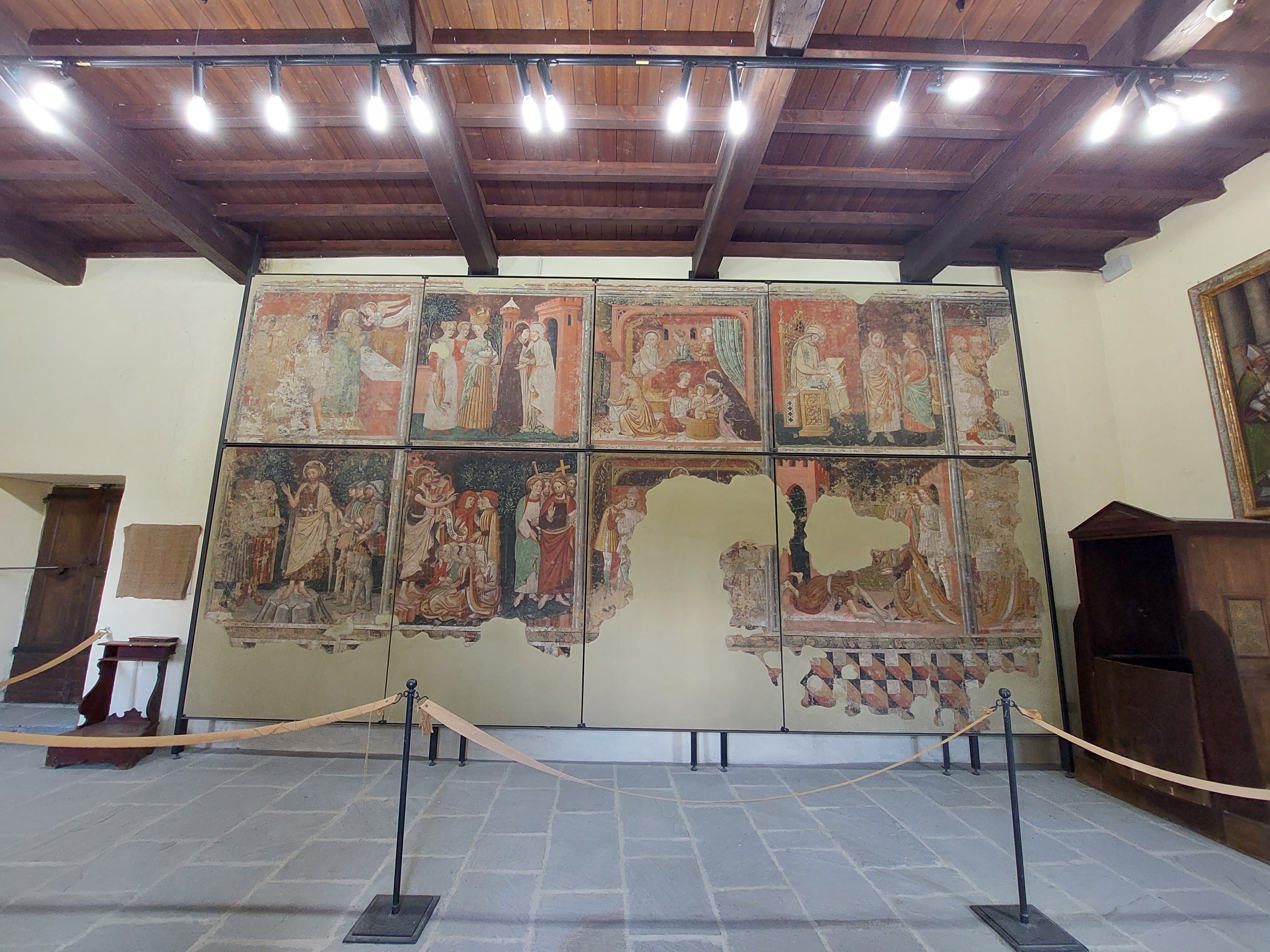
Detached frescoes formerly in San Giovanni Battista in Roncoscaglia

A church at the site was erected in 1405, with the remains, and atop the foundations of a former castle. The church once had a series of 15th-century frescoes depicting the Life of St John the Baptist; these were removed in 1857, and are now displayed in the Museo del Duomo of Modena. The simple, undecorated, stone church with a portico and its two-story bell-tower is now closed, and the roof is in danger of collapse. For some time, the parish functions were transferred to the Oratory of San Biagio.
