= Fiumalbo =

- Comune
- Comune di Fiumalbo
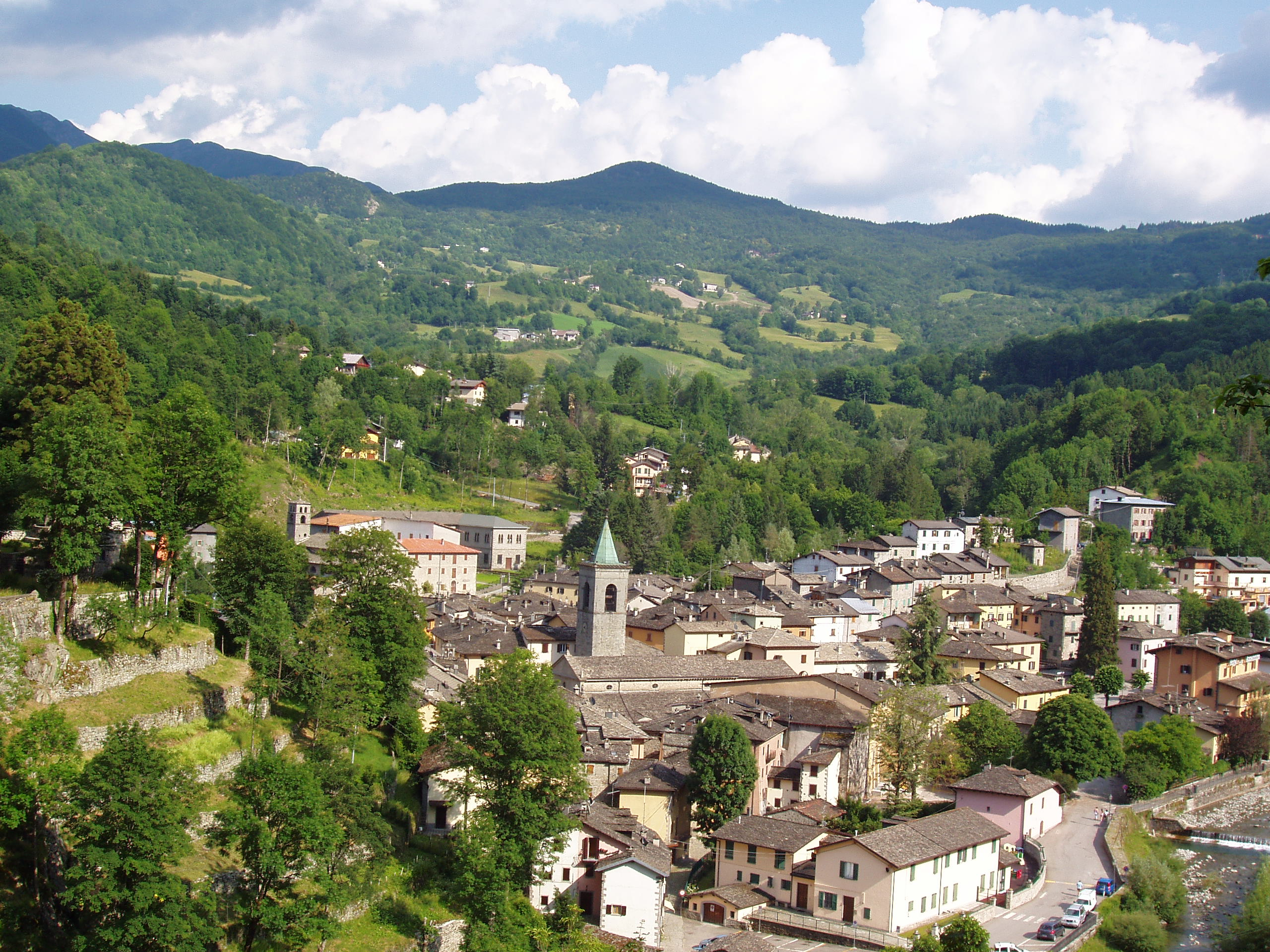

- Coat of arms

- Location within Italy Location within Emilia-Romagna
- Coordinates: 44°11′N 10°39′E
- Country: Italy
- Region: Emilia-Romagna
- Province: Modena (MO)
- Frazioni: Bivio di Fiumalbo (or Costolo), Caprili, Doccia del Cimone, Dogana (Nuova), Faidello, Fenecchio, Frescarolo, La Valle, Le Selve, Montalecchio, Roncopiano, Rotari, Ronchi, Ca' di gallo, San Michele, Versurone

Government
  - Mayor: Alessio Nizzi (lista civica)

Area
  - Total: 39.14 km^{2} (15.11 sq mi)
- Elevation (historical centre): 935 m (3,068 ft)

Population (31 August 2017)
  - Total: 1,241
  - Density: 31.71/km^{2} (82.12/sq mi)
- Demonym: Fiumalbini
- Time zone: UTC+1 (CET)
  - Summer (DST): UTC+2 (CEST)
- Postal code: 41022
- Dialing code: 0536
- Patron saint: Bartholomew the Apostle
- Saint day: 24 August
- Website: Official website

Fiumalbo is a comune (municipality) in the Province of Modena in the Italian region Emilia-Romagna, located about 70 kilometres (43 mi) southwest of Bologna and about 60 kilometres (37 mi) southwest of Modena.

Fiumalbo borders the following municipalities: Coreglia Antelminelli, Abetone Cutigliano, Fanano, Pievepelago, Riolunato, Sestola. It is one of I Borghi più belli d'Italia ("The most beautiful villages of Italy").

== History ==
Fiumalbo is a very old mountain village with almost 1,000 years of written history, but its origins are much older and have been lost over the centuries. A border town, it has experienced the events that have changed history with detachment and distance, considering those events unrelated to the history of the town.

Some sources report that the first inhabitants of the Fiumalbo Valley were the Ligurian-Frinians, who took refuge in the Modenese Apennines from the Po Valley in the 2nd century BC. The village of Fiumalbo is mentioned in an act of 1038, which sanctioned the cession of the 'Rocca che si chiama Fiumalbo' (fortress called Fiumalbo) by the Marquis Bonifacio di Canossa to the Bishop of Modena Viberto (Bonifacio was the father of Matilde di Canossa). In 1197 many people from Fiumalbo swore loyalty to the Municipality of Modena, making their territory and men available for any military needs. The oath was reconfirmed by the representatives of the Fiumalbo Community in 1205 and 1276.

Among the sites is the Romanesque church of San Bartolomeo Apostolo.
