= Gruppo =

Gruppo may refer to:

- Gruppo (music), a type of cadential trill in music
- groupset, a bicycle component manufacturer's organized collection of mechanical parts
- Leonard Gruppo (born 1942), a politician in Pennsylvania

== See also ==
- Groppo (disambiguation)
