= Abetone =

- Frazione
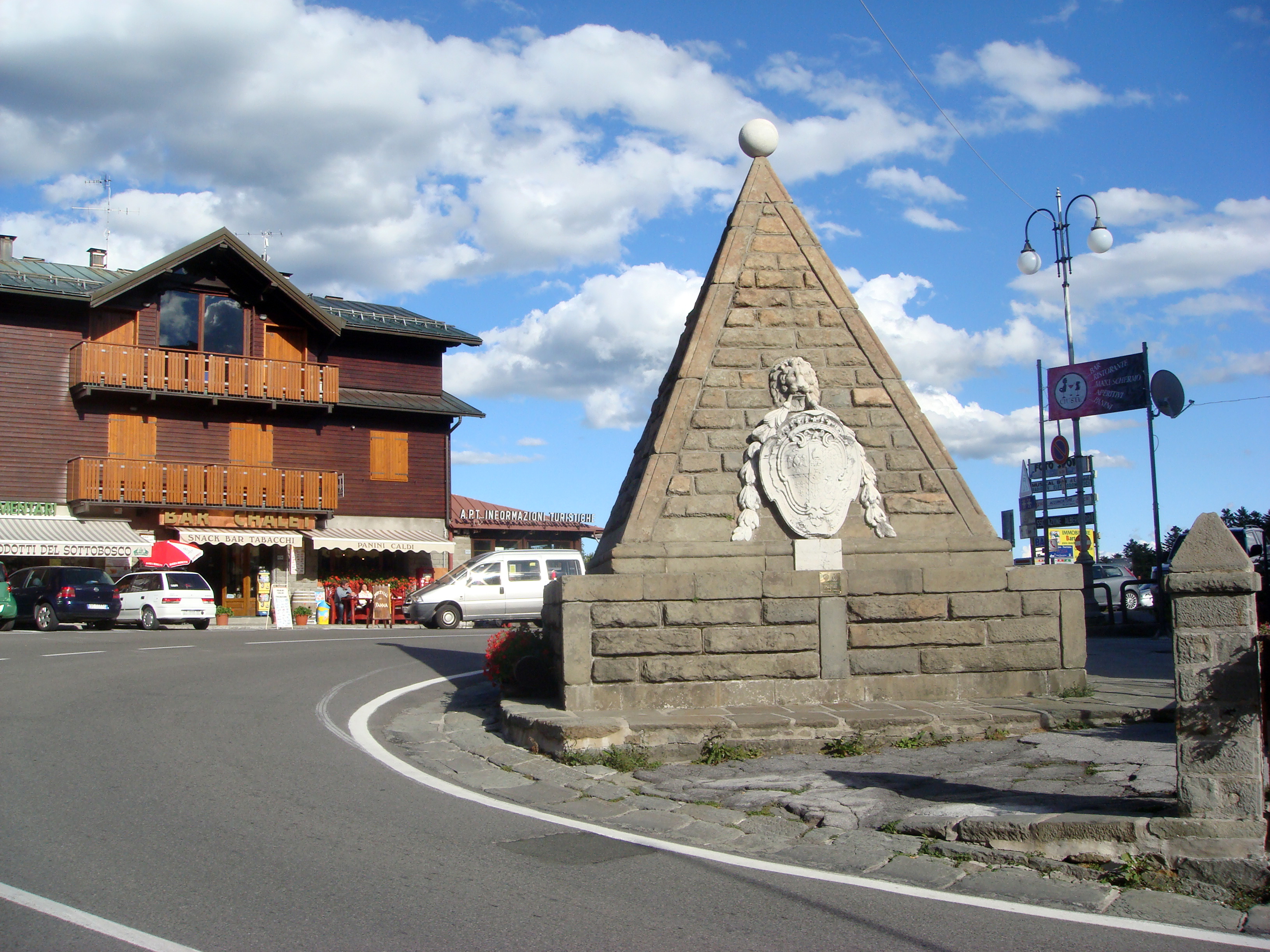
- Monument in Abetone

- Location of Abetone in Italy
- Coordinates: 44°9′46″N 10°39′55″E
- Country: Italy
- Region: Tuscany
- Province: Pistoia (PT)
- Comune: Abetone Cutigliano

Area
  - Total: 31.2 km^{2} (12.0 sq mi)
- Elevation: 1,388 m (4,554 ft)

Population (31 December 2011)
  - Total: 687
  - Density: 22.0/km^{2} (57.0/sq mi)
- Demonym: Abetonesi
- Time zone: UTC+1 (CET)
  - Summer (DST): UTC+2 (CEST)
- Postal code: 51021
- Dialing code: 0573
- Website: Official website

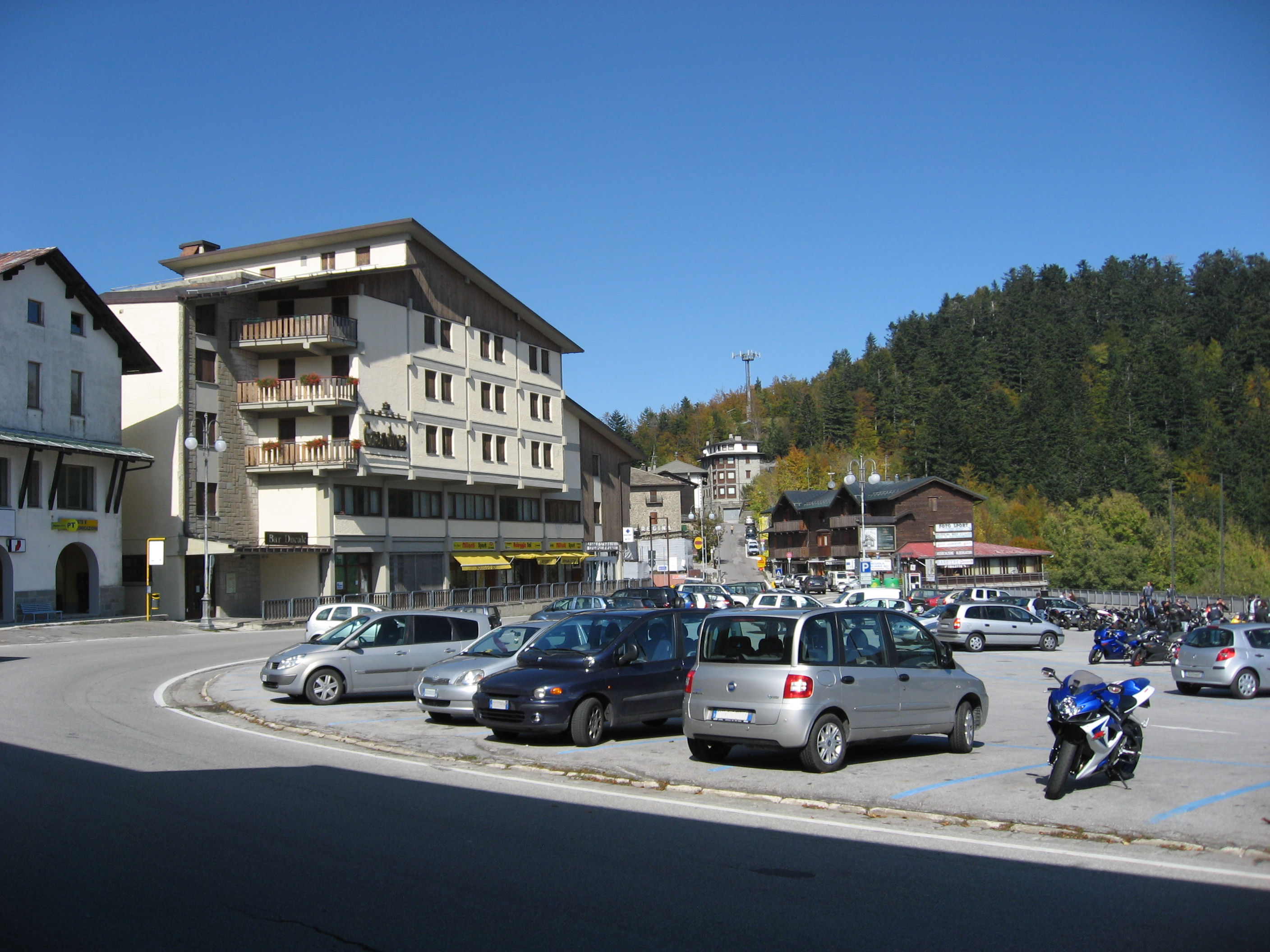
Abetone Pass

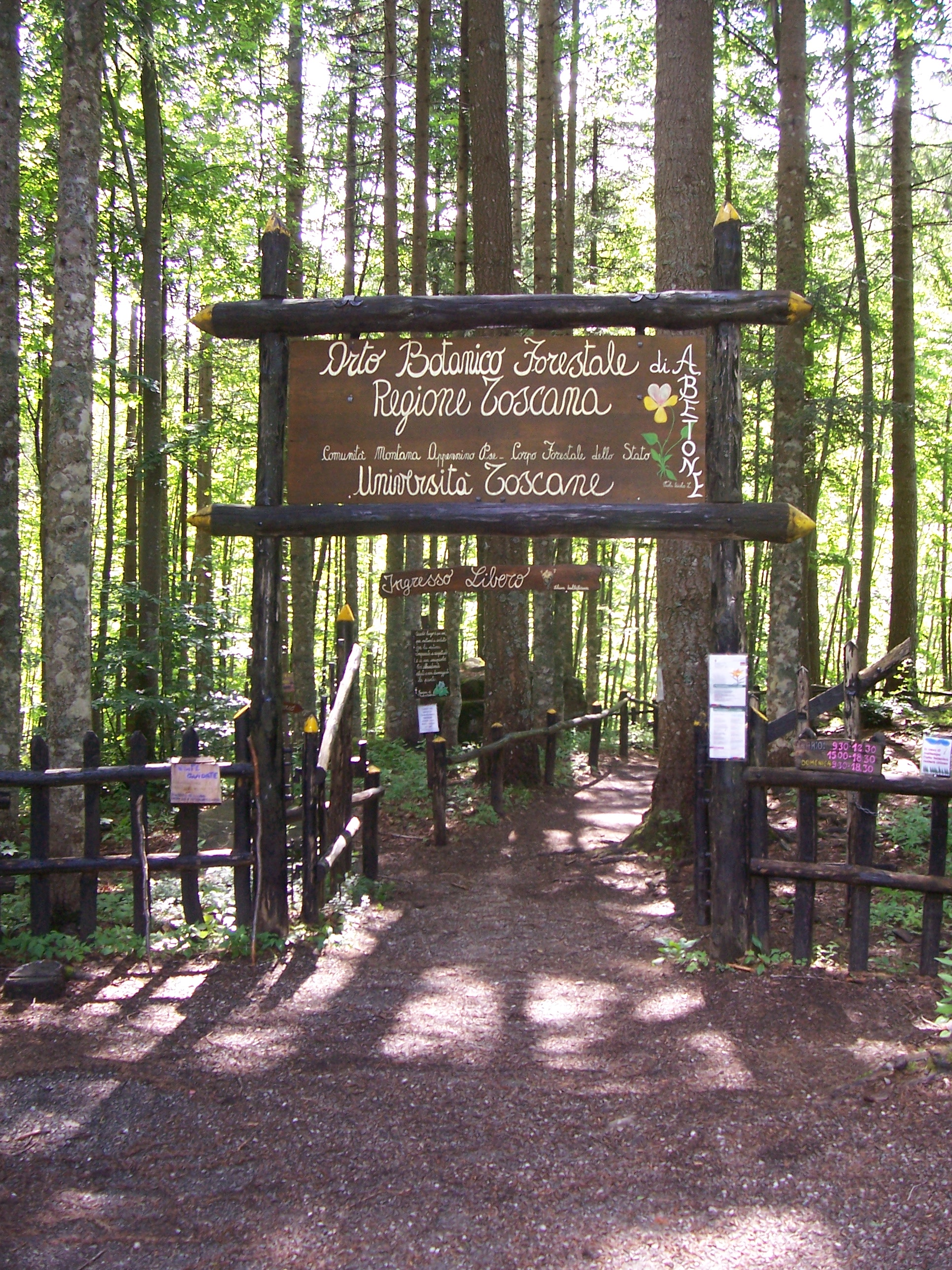
"Orto Botanico Forestale di Abetone" (Botanical Garden) - entry

Abetone was a comune (municipality) in the Province of Pistoia in the Italian region of Tuscany, located about 80 kilometres (50 mi) northwest of Florence and about 49 kilometres (30 mi) northwest of Pistoia. It has been a frazione of Abetone Cutigliano since 2017.

== History ==
Abetone (in Italian: "large fir") was founded as a custom post in 1732 on the highest point of the main road between the Grand Duchy of Tuscany and the Duchy of Modena. The name derives from a large tree, which was cut down to allow the construction to proceed.

Starting from the early 20th century, it became a popular skiing resort. Zeno Colò, an Italian skier, was born here in 1920.

Abetone served as the finish of the 5th Stage of the 2015 Giro d'Italia.

== Main sights ==
- Orto Botanico Forestale dell'Abetone, a botanical garden
- Monumento Internazionale alla Pace, a monument to peace
