= Montecreto =

- Comune
- Comune di Montecreto
- Coat of arms

- Location within Italy Location within Emilia-Romagna
- Coordinates: 44°15′N 10°43′E
- Country: Italy
- Region: Emilia-Romagna
- Province: Modena (MO)
- Frazioni: Acquaria, Magrignana, Strettara, Rovinella

Government
  - Mayor: Leandro Bonucchi

Area
  - Total: 31.2 km^{2} (12.0 sq mi)
- Elevation: 864 m (2,835 ft)

Population (31 July 2015)
  - Total: 946
  - Density: 30.3/km^{2} (78.5/sq mi)
- Demonym: Montecretesi
- Time zone: UTC+1 (CET)
  - Summer (DST): UTC+2 (CEST)
- Postal code: 41025
- Dialing code: 0536
- Patron saint: John the Baptist
- Saint day: 24 June
- Website: http://www.comune.montecreto.mo.it/

Montecreto (Frignanese: Muntcrêt) is a comune (municipality) in the Province of Modena in the Italian region Emilia-Romagna, located about 60 kilometres (37 mi) southwest of Bologna and about 50 kilometres (31 mi) southwest of Modena.

Montecreto borders the following municipalities: Lama Mocogno, Pavullo nel Frignano, Riolunato, Sestola.
