= Oratory of San Biagio, Roncoscaglia =

Church building in Roncoscaglia, Italy

The Oratory of San Biagio is Romanesque-style, Roman Catholic parish oratory or chapel or church located in the frazione of Roncoscaglia in the Apennine hills above the town of Sestola in the province of Modena, region of Emilia-Romagna, Italy.

== History ==
This oratory was erected in the 13th century and still retains sculpted images on the portal. Some of the carved images depict demons, hence a nickname of chiesa del diavolo. It is only open for certain festival days.
