= Giuseppe Castagnetti =

Italian politician and Franciscan tertiary (1909-1965)

Venerable Giuseppe Castagnetti TOSF
- Born: 15 March 1909; Montebaranzone, Prignano sulla Secchia, Modena, Kingdom of Italy
- Died: 22 June 1965 (aged 56); Prignano sulla Secchia, Modena, Italy

Giuseppe Castagnetti (15 March 1909 – 22 June 1965) was an Italian Roman Catholic. He served as a politician in his home of Modena where he served as the mayor of Prignano sulla Secchia from 1945 until his resignation in 1959. He became widely known for his ascetic life.

== Life ==
Giuseppe Castagnetti was born in Modena on 15 March 1909 to Antonio Castagnetti and Marianna Coderre as the fifth of nine children; he had at least one brother. Giuseppe began to work at an early age and he was sixteen when he began to follow his parents in their line of work in the dairy industry. His brother Dolfo died in 1933 and Giuseppe replaced him as a cheese-maker. At this stage, he had a sincere desire to join the missions after meeting missionaries in Portile; his father dissuaded him from this.

He married Giovannina Sghedoni on 11 February 1939 and the pair went on to have a total of twelve children together; two of his children - Annamaria and Gabriele - died at a young age. He took a pilgrimage to San Giovanni Rotondo in the hopes of meeting Pio of Pietrelcina, obtaining a healing from a stomach ailment that had long tormented him. Padre Pio began to spiritually guide Castagnetti and guided him through important decisions. He soon after joined Catholic Action.

Castagnetti served as a politician and was elected as the mayor of Prignano sulla Secchia from 1945 until his resignation in 1959. Appointed following World War II, he faced a dramatic situation in the form of infrastructure. He utilized the fullness of the treasury to repair what needed to be repaired after the damages of war and he made public appeals for donations. He managed to improve roads, electrical systems, a new town hall, post offices and schools.

In front of Padre Pio sometime later he pledged to wear sandals throughout his life. Castagnetti also became a member of the Third Order of Saint Francis. He died on 22 June 1965 and was hailed for his great faith and his rare show of Christian virtue.

== Beatification process ==
Castagnetti gained a strong reputation for an ascetic and pious life and was hailed after his death for his saintliness and a life in tune with the Franciscan charism. This led to frequent calls for his canonization.

The beatification process commenced on 25 September 2009 under Pope Benedict XVI which named him Servant of God. The process opened in a local diocesan tribunal on 21 December 2013 and it concluded its business on 12 June 2015. Pope Leo XIV issued a decree declaring him Venerable on 23 March 2026.
