= Orto Botanico Forestale dell'Abetone =

Botanical garden in Italy

Coordinates: 44°07′34″N 10°39′56″E

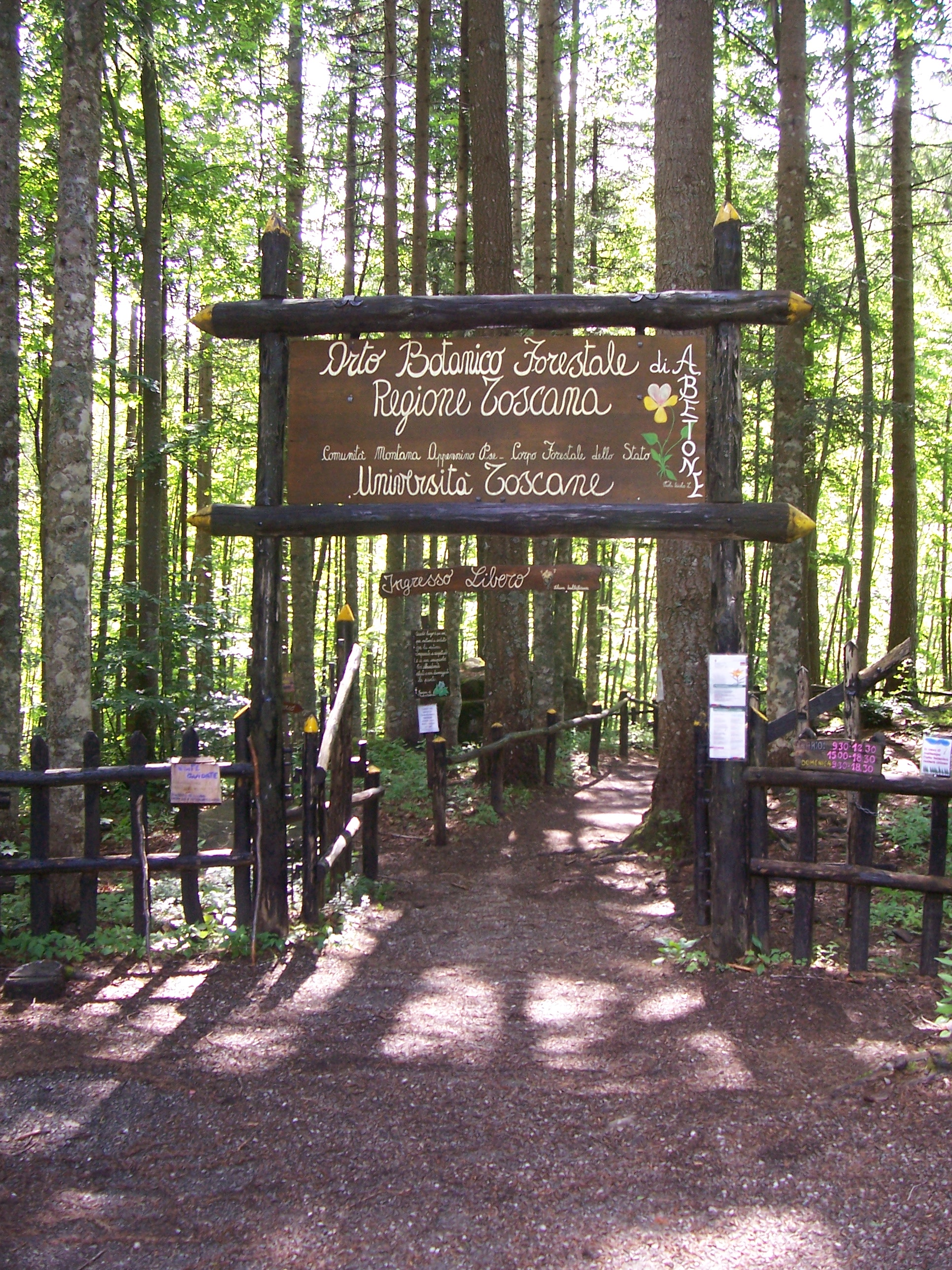
Orto Botanico Forestale dell'Abetone Entrance

The Orto Botanico Forestale dell'Abetone (1.4 hectares) is a botanical garden located in Fontana Vaccaia, Abetone Cutigliano, Province of Pistoia, Tuscany, central Italy.

It is open daily in the warmer months. The garden was inaugurated in 1987, and currently managed by a consortium formed of the Tuscany Region, State Forestry Corps, Mountain Community dell'Appennino Pistoiese, and the Universities of Florence, Pisa and Siena.

It contains about 300 plant species native to the northern Apennine Mountains, including blueberry, gentian, saxifrage, lily, moss and lichen, orchid, primrose, as well as fir, beech, birch, spruce, and willow. Species of interest include Abies alba, Caltha palustris, Fagus sylvatica, Gentiana asclepiadea, Gentiana kochiana, Gentiana purpurea, Gentiana verna, Laburnum anagyroides, Sorbus aucuparia, Picea abies, Pinguicula leptoceras, and Viola palustris.

== See also ==
- List of botanical gardens in Italy
