= San Bartolomeo Apostolo, Fiumalbo =

Roman Catholic parish church in Italy

Coordinates: 44°10′47.3″N 10°38′51.8″E

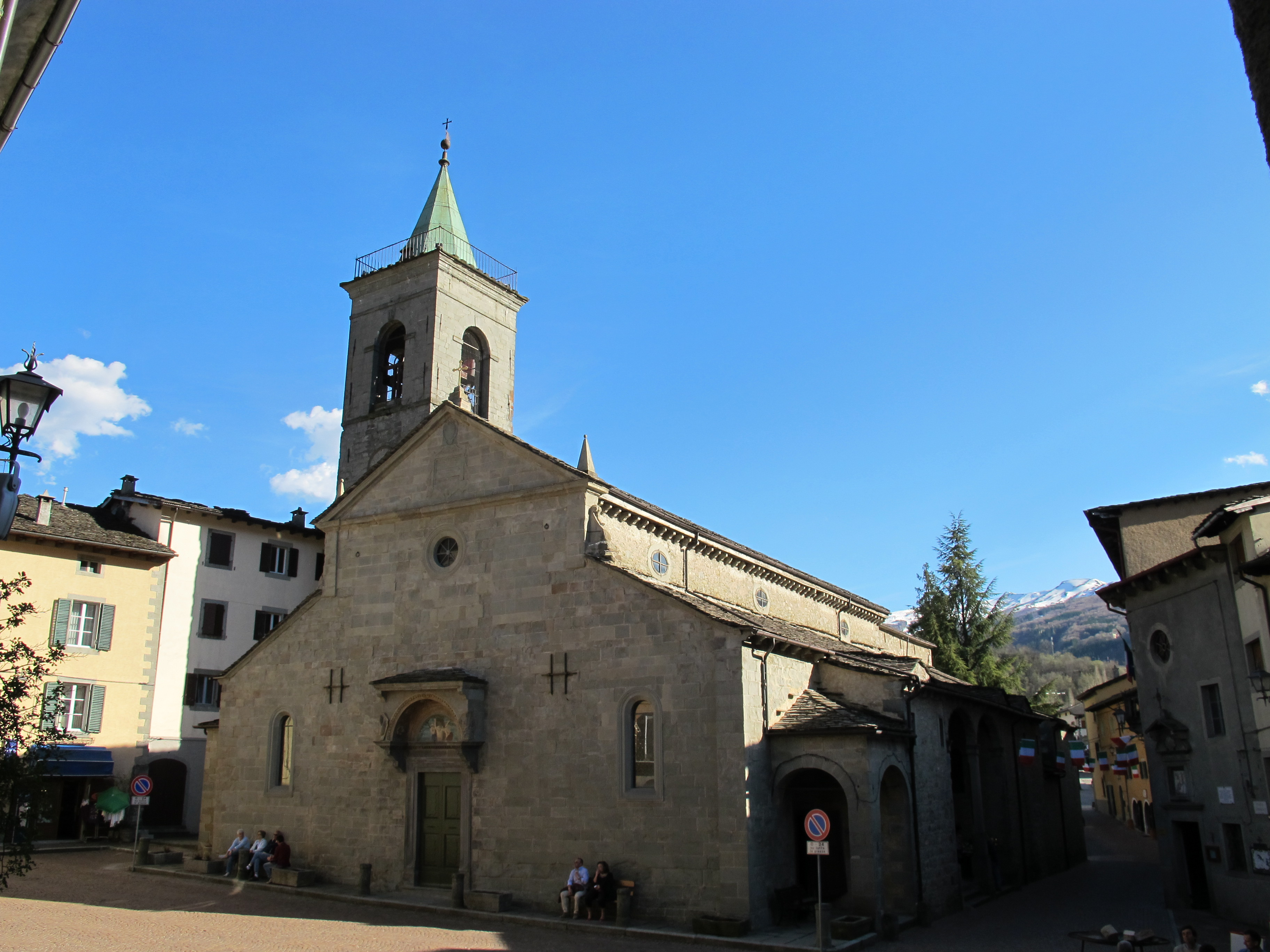
A view of the church

San Bartolomeo Apostolo is Roman Catholic parish church located in the town of Fiumalbo, province of Modena, in the region of Emilia-Romagna, Italy.

== History ==
A Romanesque church at the site has been documented since 1220. The church was reconstructed and reoriented from 1589 to 1592, with further work in 1630 and 1826. The apse remains of the earlier church. The main portal (1594) is made from carved stone. The interior has a nave and two aisles. The wooden ceiling is baroque. The walls contain sculpted spolia from the earlier church, including behind the main altar a relief depicting a lady on horseback with a warrior, which is said to depict Matilde di Canossa and the count Guido Guerra I, at the Battle of Sorbara. The church has a Madonna and Child, Young John the Baptist and Saints by Camillo Gavasseti. In the choir is a depiction of a Martyrdom of St Bartholemew by Adeodato Malatesta. The nearby Oratory of St Roch has paintings by maestro Savallino da Carpi, eseguiti nel 1535. On August 23–24 for the Feast of Saint Bartholomew, the festival of the saint includes a candlelight procession through the town to this church.
