= Santa Maria Assunta, Pievepelago =

Church building in Pievepelago, Italy

Santa Maria Assunta is Roman Catholic parish church located in the town of Pievepelago in the region of Emilia-Romagna, Italy.

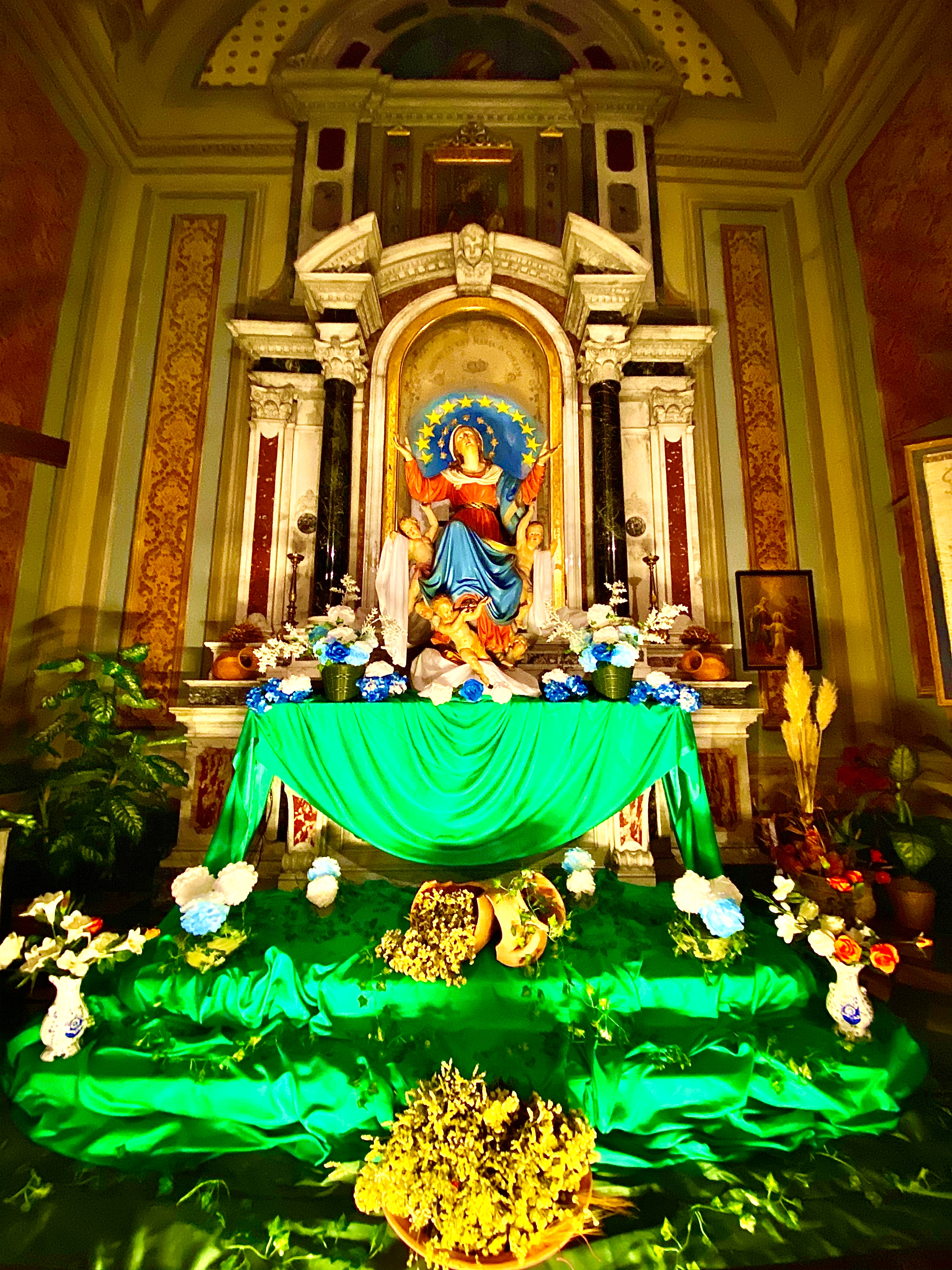
Plebana di Santa Maria Assunta di Pievepelago.

== History ==
A parish church at the site is documented since 1038, but little remains of that building. Construction of the present parish began 1868 designed by Cesare Costa, and was consecrated in 1874. The church houses a Glory of Santa Filomena by Adeodato Malatesta.

The counter facade has paintings depicting St Francis and the Immaculate Conception (1918) by Gaetano Bellei. The left transept has a reliquary urn for St Theodore in Neocalssic style by Gaetano Boccini. The main chapel has an altarpiece depicting the Virgin in Glory by the painter Carlo Rizzi. The church also houses a St Luigi Gonzaga (1853) by Luigi Asioli. Beside the church is the Oratory of San Luigi, built in 1754, and the Oratory of the Bianchi, built under the patronage of the empress of Austria in the late 1700s.
