= Cutigliano =

- Frazione
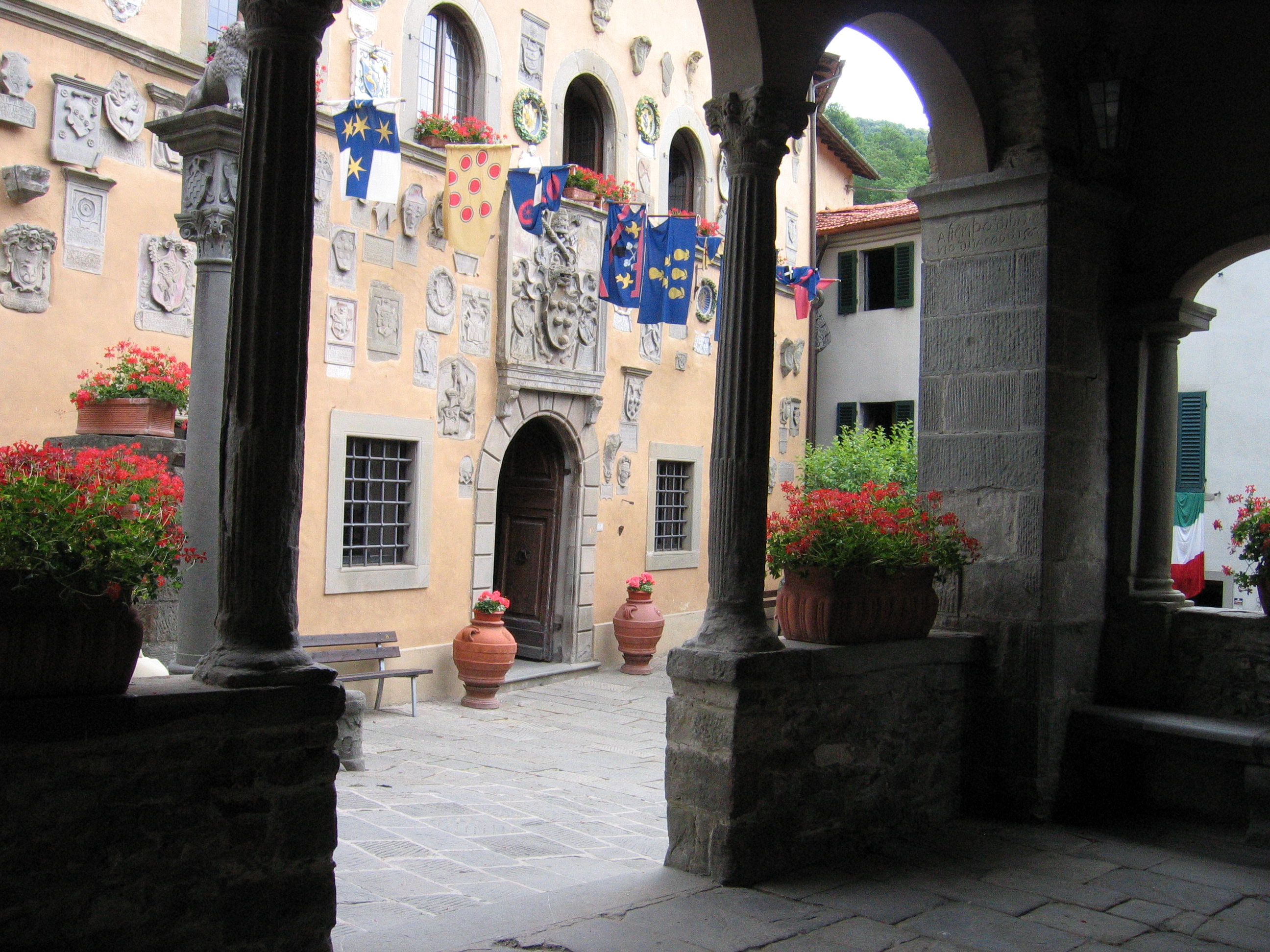

- Location of Cutigliano in Italy
- Coordinates: 44°6′N 10°45′E
- Country: Italy
- Region: Tuscany
- Province: Pistoia (PT)
- Comune: Abetone Cutigliano

Area
  - Total: 43.8 km^{2} (16.9 sq mi)
- Elevation: 678 m (2,224 ft)

Population (1 January 2007)
  - Total: 1,621
  - Density: 37.0/km^{2} (95.9/sq mi)
- Demonym: Cutiglianesi
- Time zone: UTC+1 (CET)
  - Summer (DST): UTC+2 (CEST)
- Postal code: 51024
- Dialing code: 0573
- Website: Official website

Cutigliano was a comune (municipality) in the province of Pistoia in the Italian region Tuscany, located about 50 kilometres (31 mi) northwest of Florence and about 25 kilometres (16 mi) northwest of Pistoia. It has been a frazione of Abetone Cutigliano since 2017.

== People ==
- Biagio Betti

== Monuments and places of interest ==
=== Religious buildings ===
- Madonna di Piazza church
- San Bartolomeo church

=== Civic Buildings ===
- Palazzo di Giustizia
- Palazzo del Capitano a Cutigliano
