= Feast of Saint Bartholomew =

Festival commemorating a Christian apostle

Saint Bartholomew's Day
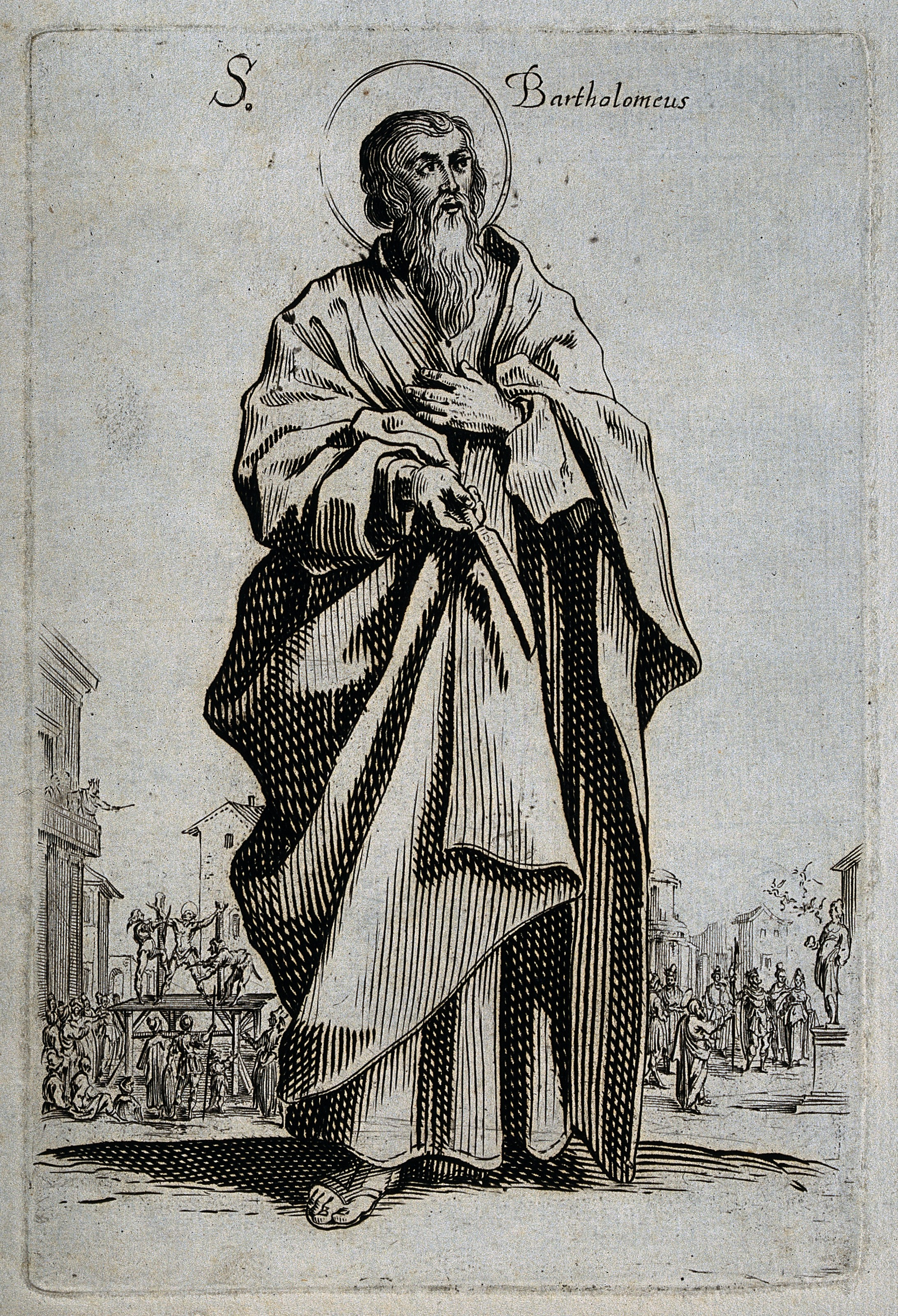
- Engraving of Saint Bartholomew
- Observed by: Catholic Church; Church of England; Eastern Orthodox Church Lutheran Church
- Type: Christian
- Date: August 24
- Frequency: Annual
- Related to: Bartholomew the Apostle

The Feast of Saint Bartholomew, also known as Saint Bartholomew's Day, is a Christian liturgical celebration of Bartholomew the Apostle which occurs yearly on August 24 of the liturgical calendars of the Catholic Church and the Church of England. The Eastern Orthodox liturgical calendar commemorates James on June 11.

The feast honors Saint Bartholomew, one of the twelve apostles of Jesus Christ, reflecting on his contributions to the early Christian Church and his unwavering faith.

== Background ==
Saint Bartholomew is traditionally identified with Nathanael, a figure mentioned in the Gospel of John who was introduced to Jesus by Philip. According to Christian tradition, Bartholomew was one of the first to recognize Jesus as the Messiah. His name, Bartholomew, is derived from the Aramaic "Bar-Talmai," meaning "son of Talmai."

Bartholomew's missionary work is believed to have taken him to various regions, including India, Armenia, and Persia. According to tradition, he met a martyr's death, though accounts of his martyrdom vary. Some sources suggest he was flayed alive and then beheaded, while others propose different methods of execution.

== Liturgical significance ==
In the Roman Catholic Church, the feast of Saint Bartholomew is a solemnity, which is a significant celebration in the liturgical calendar. It is a day set aside to reflect on the apostle's role in spreading Christianity and to seek his intercession. The feast day is observed with special liturgical services, including the Eucharist and prayers. It is also a time for the faithful to reflect on the virtues exemplified by Saint Bartholomew, such as his dedication and courage in the face of persecution.

In the Eastern Orthodox Church, the feast is celebrated with a similar sense of reverence, incorporating traditional hymns and readings that honor the apostle's memory. The Orthodox Church also commemorates Saint Bartholomew's contributions to the early Church and his role as a witness to Christ's teachings.

== Traditions and observances ==
=== Local devotion ===
The Feast of Saint Bartholomew is marked by various local customs and traditions. In some places, processions, feasts, and special prayers are part of the observance. In certain regions, Saint Bartholomew is venerated as the patron saint of specific towns, and local celebrations often reflect these associations.

==== Lipari since 580 ====
In 580, the remains of the Apostle were transported to the island of Lipari, Italy. Since then, his feast is kept on the day of his arrival which was one day after his feast on the August 25.

==== Benevento since 809 ====
In 809, his remains sheltered from Arab invasions in Sicily, by bringing them to Benevento on the continent, before reaching Rome where she still rests. To this day, a yearly celebration is kept to honor this translation of his relics.

==== Fiumalbo since 1220 ====
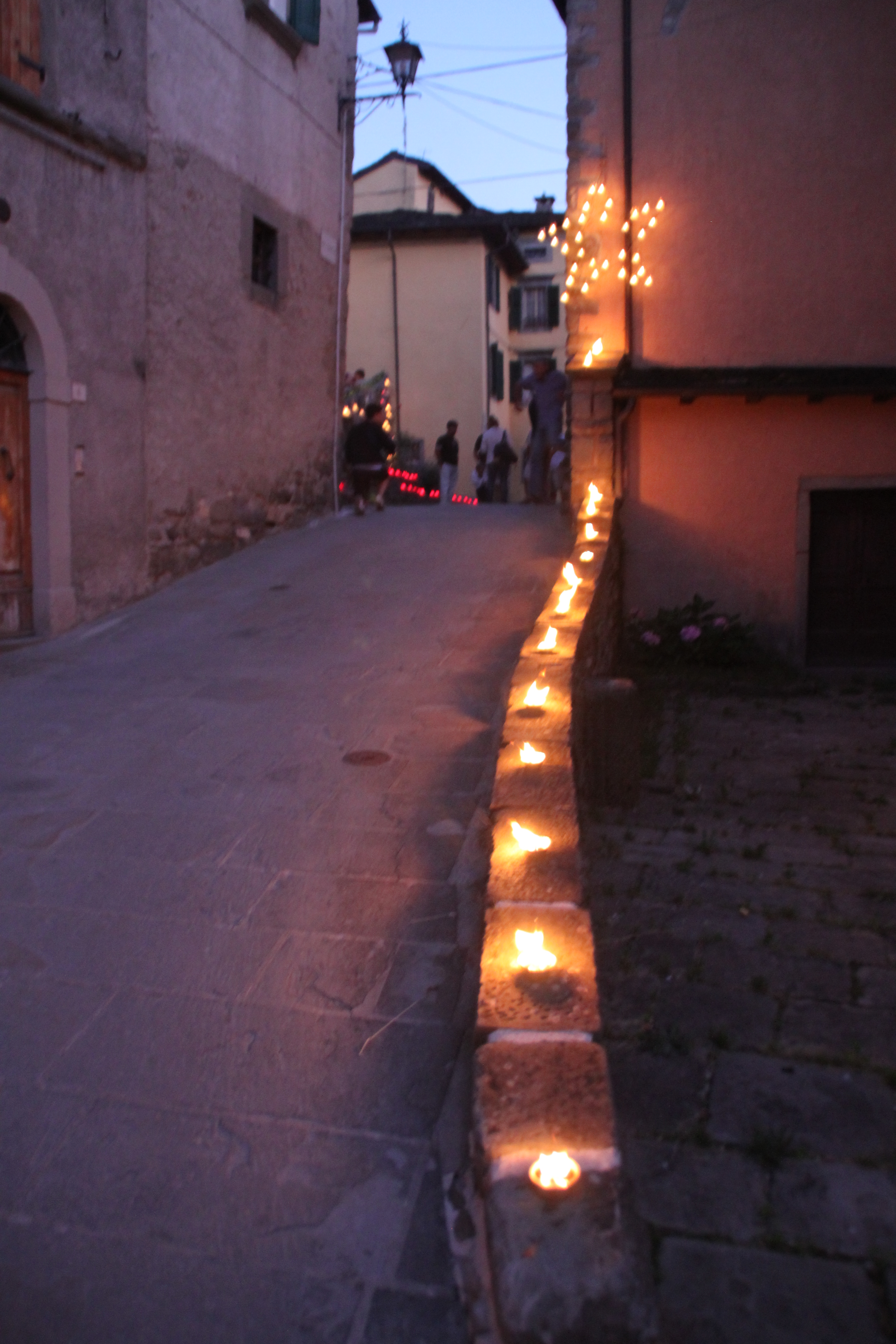
Road to Aia Chioccia in Fiumalbo on Bartholomew the Apostle's day's eve 2011, lit by candles as per tradition.

A Romanesque church dedicated to San Bartolomeo Apostolo in Fiumalbo is documented since 1220. On the evening of the eve of the patronal feast of Saint Bartholomew on August 23, the entire town of Fiumalbo is lit up with fire in a centuries-old tradition. Torches, lights, and candles illuminate the streets of the ancient medieval village.

The mirage of the river is surreal, on which thousands of candles burn, transforming it into an incandescent watercourse. The view of the ancient fortress that overlooks the town is also suggestive, the promontory where it stands is completely illuminated with large torches. This landscape is the backdrop to the Procession with the statue of the Saint accompanied by the ancient Confraternities of tine dressed in white and red, in traditional costumes and with banners that have been preserved for centuries.

At the end of the evening, a fireworks display takes place. On August 24, the traditional fair with stalls takes place, followed by the tombola that concludes the celebrations.

==== Corsica since the 16th century ====
In Corsica, the feast of Saint Bartholomew is one of the largest procession of the summer season. The medieval chapel of San Bertuli overlooks the Conca d'Orezza at an altitude of 1074 m. On August 24, the faithful from all over the region come there to express their devotion in the purest tradition. As celebrated by the Confraternities of Bonifacio. The penitents carry an 800 kg (2000 lb) processional throne dating to the 17th century. A poem in Ligurgian dialect goes as such:

L'omi suta stimpinavinu.

Ma i stanghi, eli cantavinu.

San Burtumia ira ben purtaiu.

Da tanti seculi cusci e sempri staiu.

=== Art ===
Artistic representations of Saint Bartholomew often depict him holding a flaying knife, a reference to his reputed martyrdom. His iconography may also include elements that highlight his role as an apostle and his commitment to spreading the Christian faith.

== Legacy: the feast and the massacre ==
The Feast of Saint Bartholomew serves as a reminder of the early apostles' sacrifices and their foundational role in the Christian faith. It provides an opportunity for believers to reflect on the qualities of Saint Bartholomew and to seek inspiration from his example. His story underscores themes of faith, mission, and perseverance, which continue to resonate in Christian teachings and practice. The legacy of Saint Bartholomew and the significance of his feast day extend beyond the liturgical calendar, influencing Christian art, literature, and communal practices. The apostle's life and martyrdom continue to inspire devotion and reflection among Christians worldwide. However, the feast of Saint Bartholomew is also marred by the stain of the massacre which occurred on the same date in 1572.

== Gallery ==
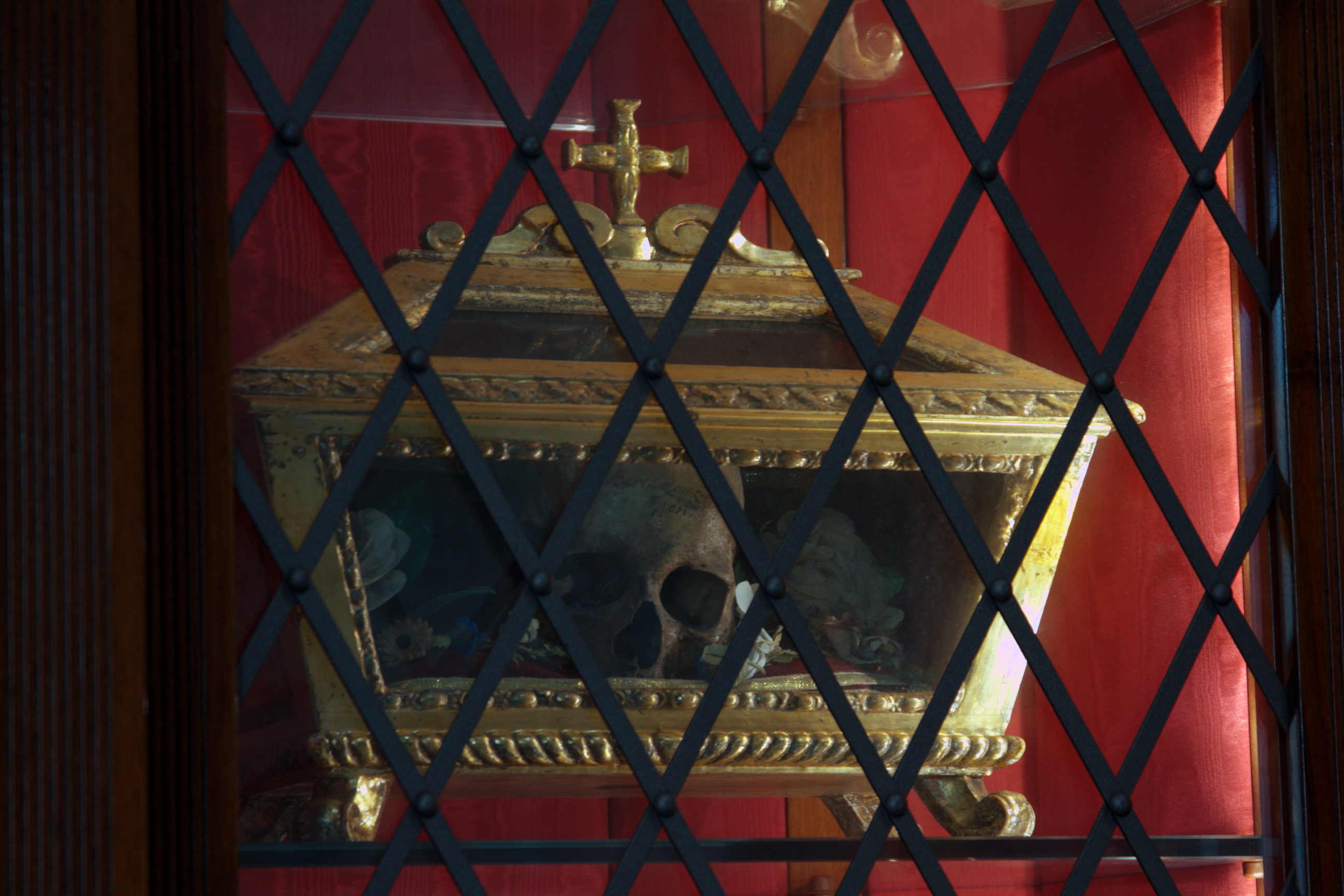
Relics of Saint Bartholomew in Camposanto, Pisa

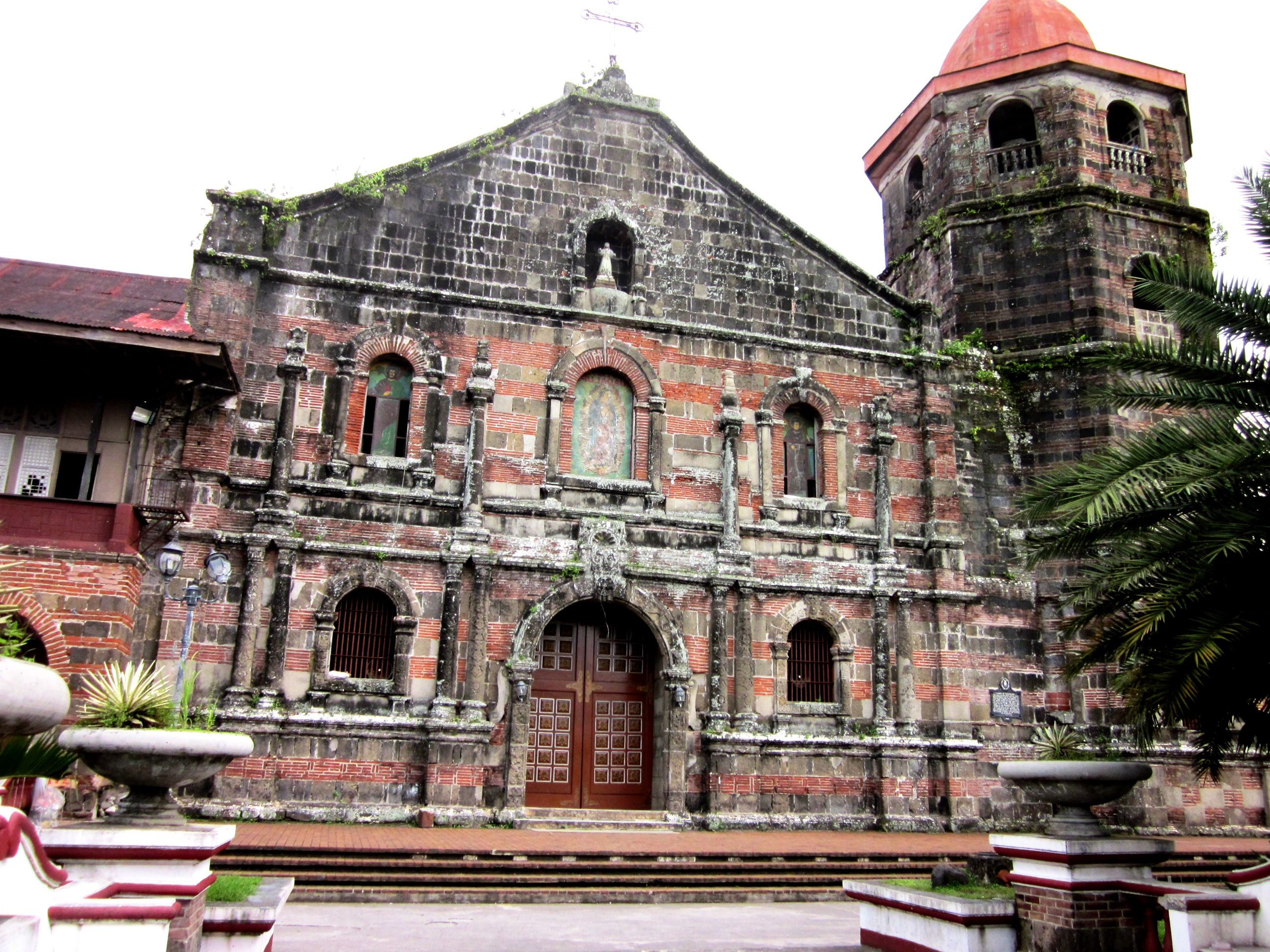
Saint Bartholomew the Apostle Parish Church, is a Roman Catholic church in Nagcarlan, Laguna, Philippines

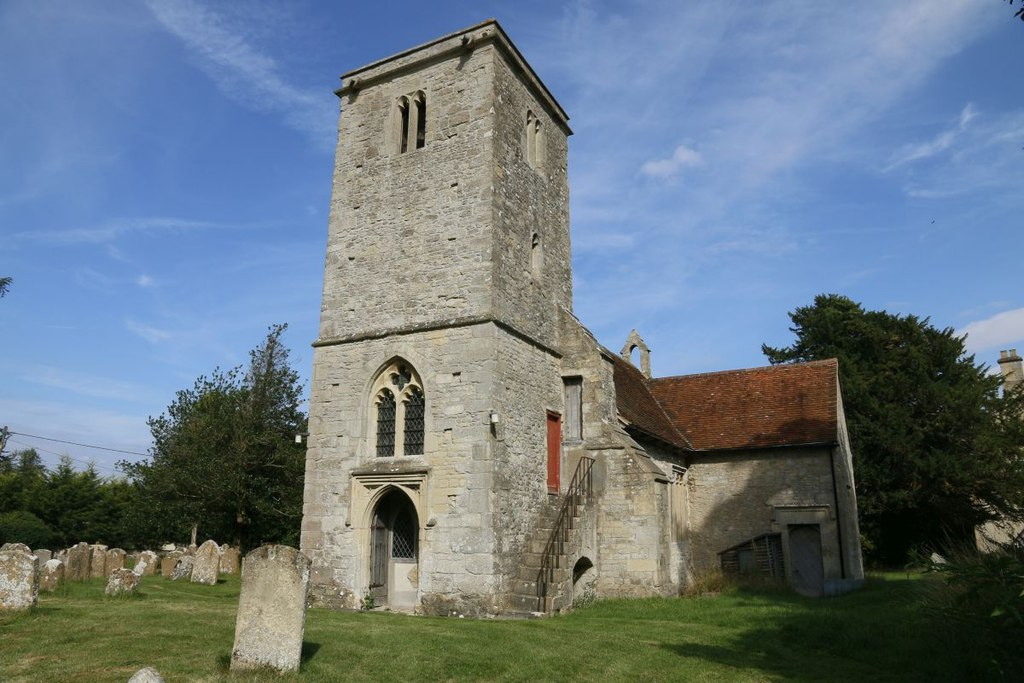
The tower on Saint Bartholomew in Holton, United Kingdom

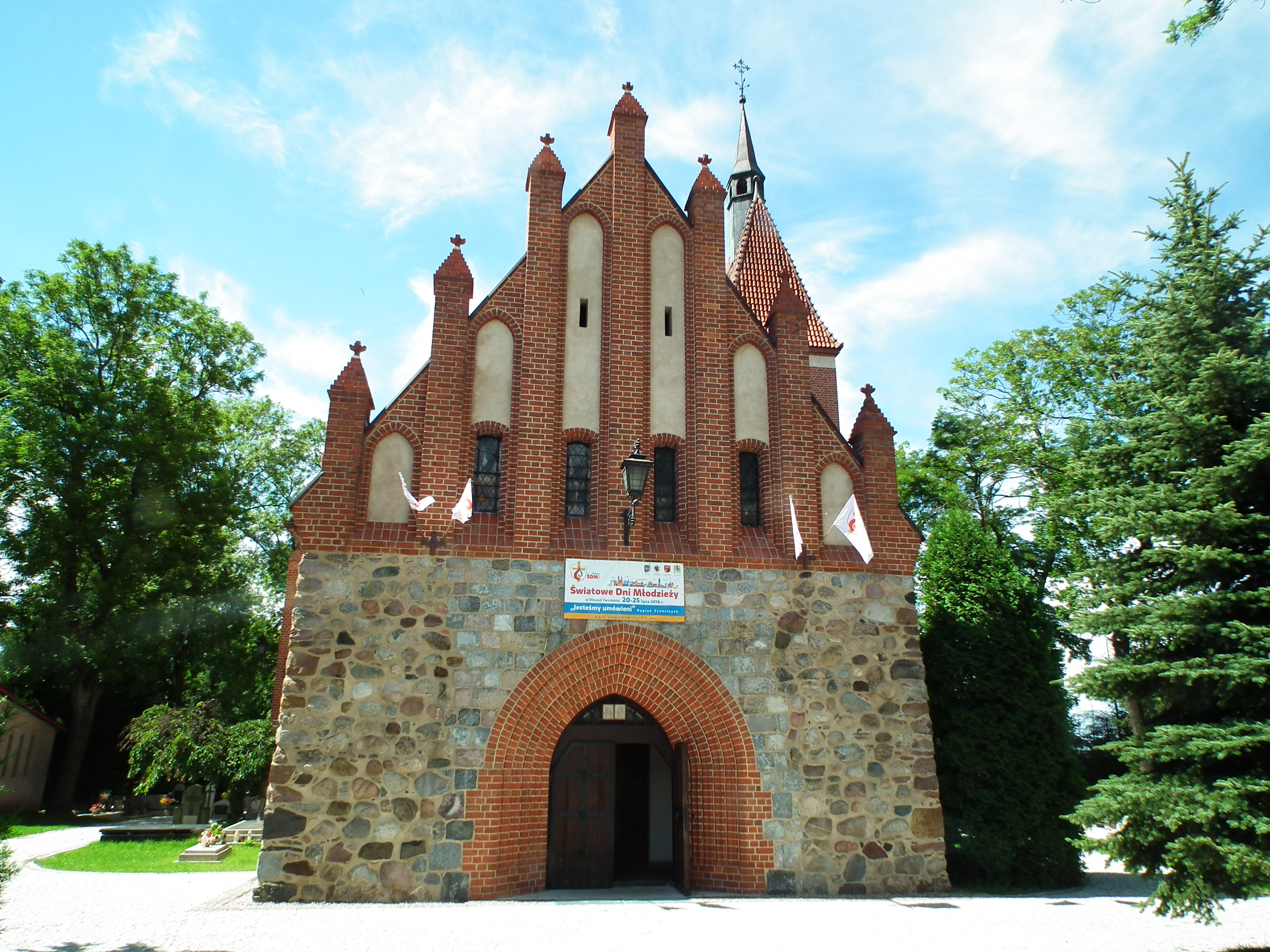
Saint Bartholomew church in Unisław, Poland

== See also ==
- St. Bartholomew's Day massacre
