= Prignano sulla Secchia =

- Comune
- Comune di Prignano sulla Secchia
- Location within Italy Location within Emilia-Romagna
- Coordinates: 44°26′N 10°41′E
- Country: Italy
- Region: Emilia-Romagna
- Province: Modena (MO)
- Frazioni: Saltino, Morano, Castelvecchio, Montebaranzone, Pigneto, Sassomorello, Pescarola

Government
  - Mayor: Mauro Fantini

Area
  - Total: 80.5 km^{2} (31.1 sq mi)
- Elevation: 560 m (1,840 ft)

Population (31 December 2010)
  - Total: 3,813
  - Density: 47.4/km^{2} (123/sq mi)
- Demonym: Prignanesi
- Time zone: UTC+1 (CET)
  - Summer (DST): UTC+2 (CEST)
- Postal code: 41048
- Dialing code: 0536
- Patron saint: St. Lawrence
- Saint day: August 10
- Website: Official website

Prignano sulla Secchia (Modenese: Prignân; locally Pérgnân) is a comune (municipality) in the Province of Modena in the Italian region Emilia-Romagna, located about 50 kilometres (31 mi) west of Bologna and about 30 kilometres (19 mi) southwest of Modena. It is in the Modenese Apennines, in the valley of the Secchia river.

Prignano sulla Secchia borders the following municipalities: Baiso, Castellarano, Palagano, Polinago, Sassuolo, Serramazzoni, Toano.

== Notable people ==
- Giuseppe Castagnetti (1909–1965), Roman Catholic politician
