= Groppo (surname) =

Groppo is a surname. Notable people with the surname include:

- John Groppo (1921–2013), American mason contractor, businessman, and politician
- Marco Groppo (born 1960), Italian professional cyclist

== See also ==
- Groppo (music), a type of cadential trill in music
