= Punto a groppo =

Precursor to bobbin lace

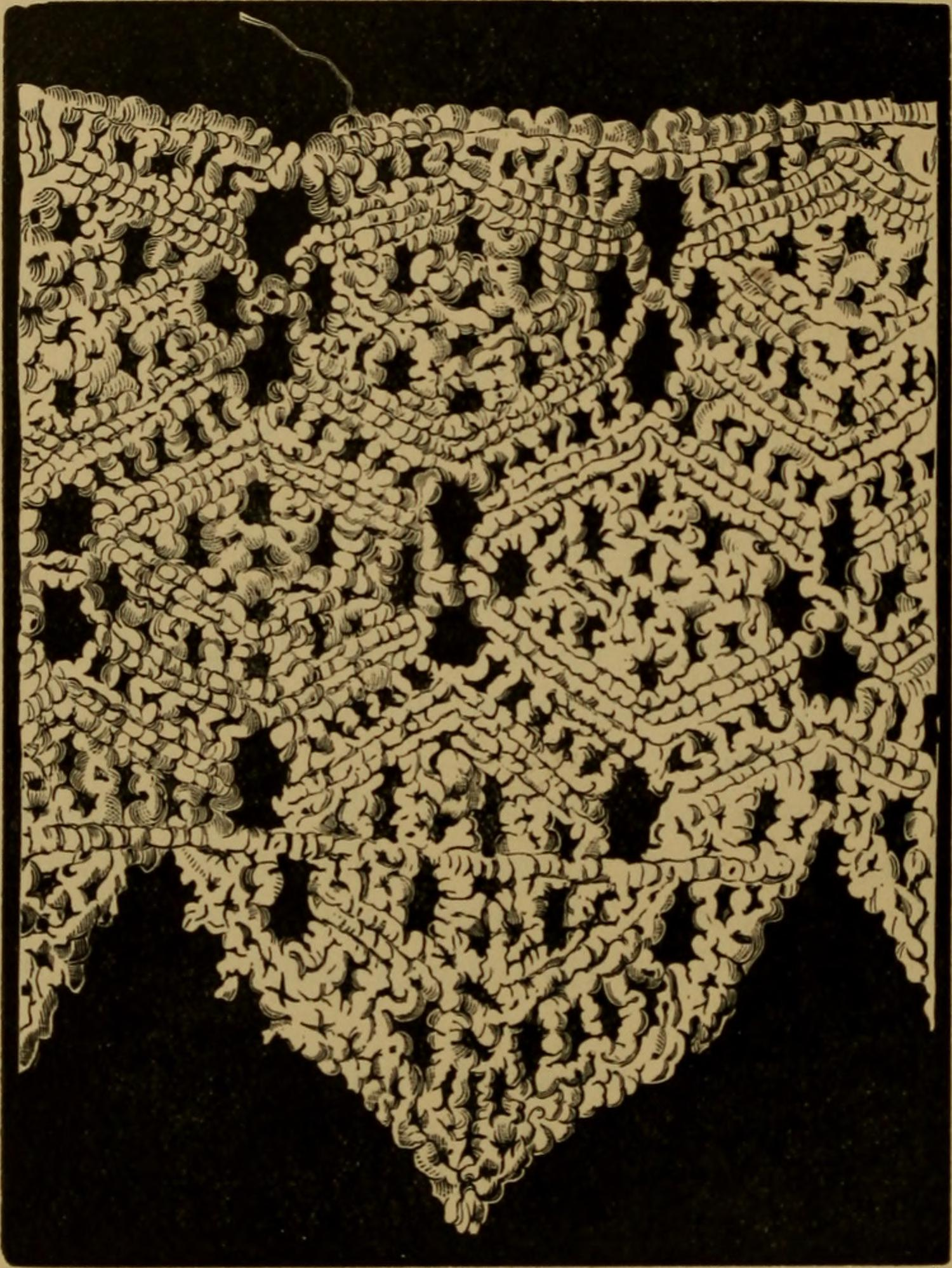
1902 illustration of punto a groppo

Punto a groppo (Italian, "knotted lace") is type of lace made without bobbins (weights). It originated in Italy, possibly Milan, in the 16th century and usually incorporated geometric patterns. It is the precursor to bobbin lace. Remaining samples of this lace are rare.

Punto a groppo was typically used for edging. Although related to macramé, which is knotted by hand, punto a groppo was likely created with a needle.

Punto a groppo was also called gropo, gruppo, gropari, and point noué.
