= Biagio Brugi =

Italian jurist

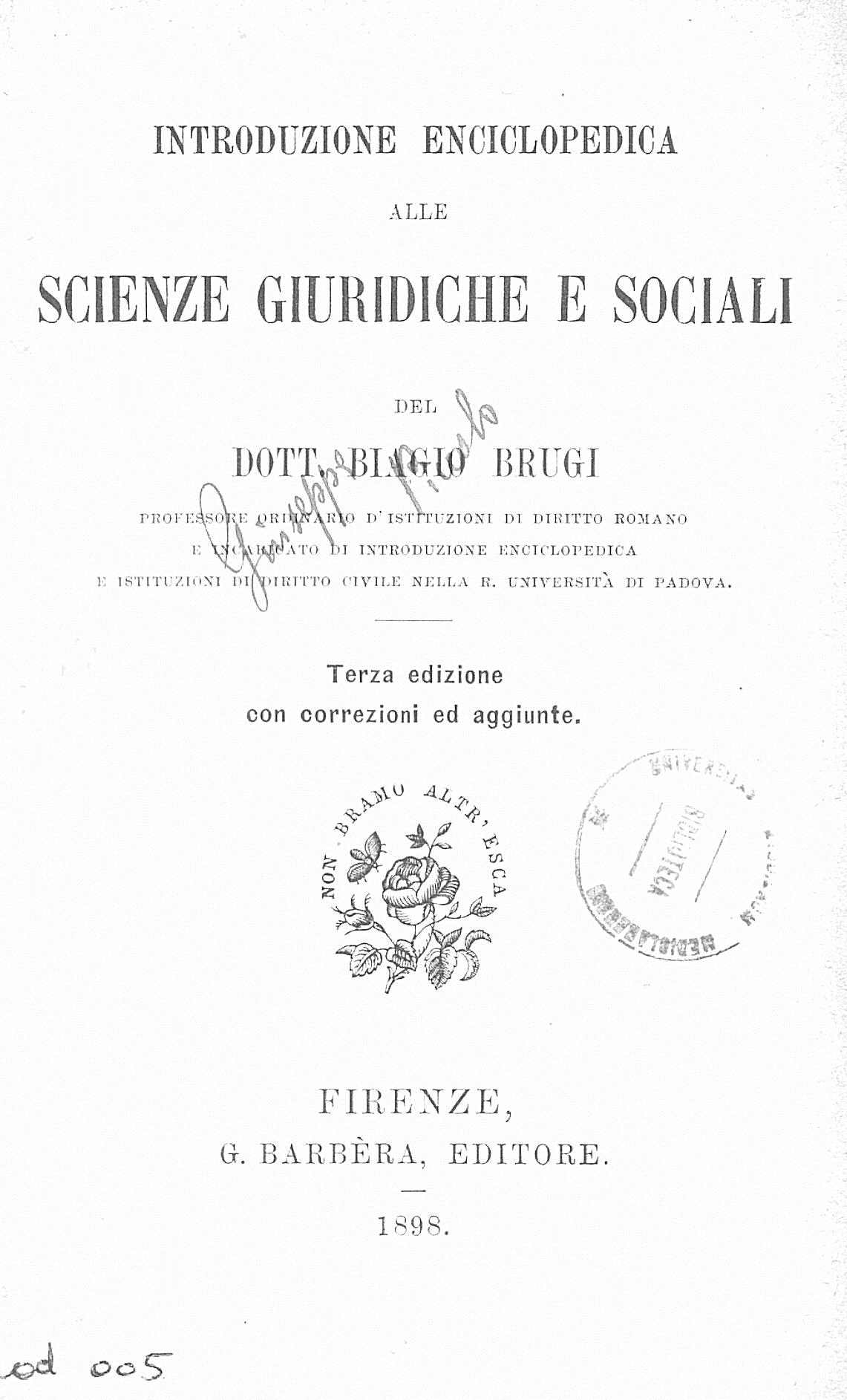
Introduzione enciclopedica alle scienze giuridiche e sociali, 1898

Biagio Brugi (1855 – 1934) was an Italian jurist. He taught Roman law at Catania (1882), Padua (1885) and Pisa (1918–30). He was a student of Filippo Serafini.

His works underline the relevance of Roman law for contemporary jurisprudence. His influential 1891 textbook Introduzione enciclopedica alle scienze giuridiche e sociali nel sistema della giurisprudenza emphasised the importance of research in the political and social sciences for the study of law.

Brugi was a member of the Accademia dei Lincei, the Istituto Veneto and of several foreign academies, as well as government commissions. In 1928 he was made a senator for life.

== Works ==
- Introduzione enciclopedica alle scienze giuridiche e sociali (in Italian). Firenze: Barbèra. 1898.

== Bibliography ==
- Torre, Stefania (2001). "Biagio Brugi". In Michael Stolleis (ed.). Juristen: ein biographisches Lexikon; von der Antike bis zum 20. Jahrhundert (in German) (2nd ed.). München: Beck. p. 106. ISBN 3-406-45957-9.
