= Biagio Betti =

Italian painter

Biagio Betti (1535–1605) was an Italian painter of the late-Renaissance or Mannerist period. He was born in Cutigliano. He became, in 1557, a monk of the order of the Theatines of San Silvestro al Quirinale, and his works are principally confined to the monastery of that order in Rome.

In Rome, he became a pupil of Daniele da Volterra. In the refectory of the Theatine monastery, he painted the Miracle of the Loaves and Fishes which was restored by Paolo Anesi in 1847; and in the library, Christ disputing with the Doctors. He is said to have been prized by Pope Clement VIII.
