= Palagano =

- Comune
- Comune di Palagano
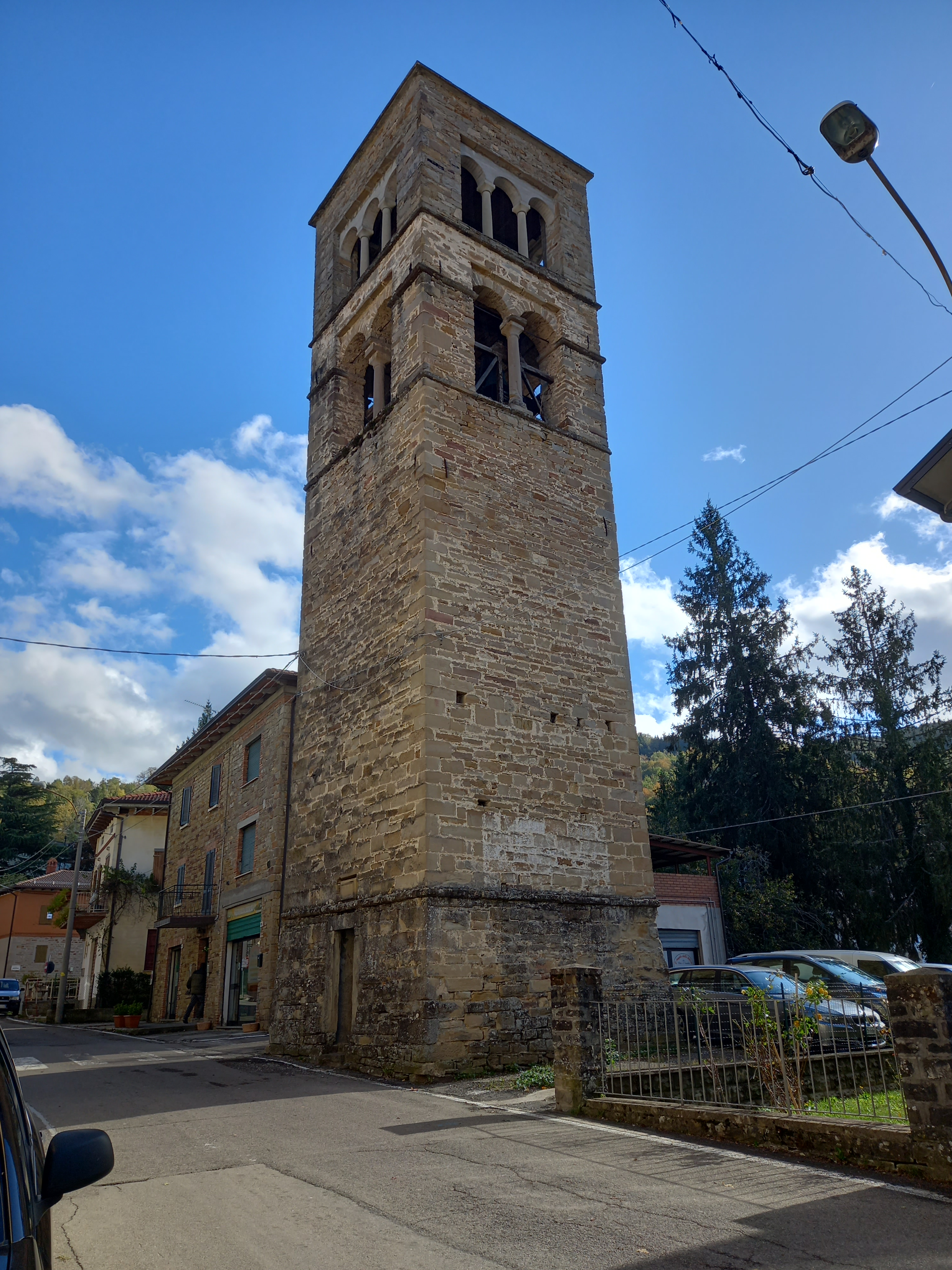

- Location within Italy Location within Emilia-Romagna
- Coordinates: 44°19′N 10°39′E
- Country: Italy
- Region: Emilia-Romagna
- Province: Province of Modena (MO)
- Frazioni: Boccassuolo, Costrignano, Monchio, Savoniero, Susano

Government
  - Mayor: Fabio Braglia

Area
  - Total: 60.4 km^{2} (23.3 sq mi)
- Elevation: 705 m (2,313 ft)

Population (Dec. 2004)
  - Total: 2,455
  - Density: 40.6/km^{2} (105/sq mi)
- Demonym: Palaganesi
- Time zone: UTC+1 (CET)
  - Summer (DST): UTC+2 (CEST)
- Postal code: 41046
- Dialing code: 0536
- Website: Official website

Palagano (Frignanese: Palaghen) is a comune (municipality) in the Province of Modena in the Italian region Emilia-Romagna, located about 60 kilometres (37 mi) southwest of Bologna and about 45 kilometres (28 mi) southwest of Modena. As of 31 December 2004, it had a population of 2,455 and an area of 60.4 square kilometres (23.3 mi^{2}).

The municipality of Palagano contains the frazioni (subdivisions, mainly villages and hamlets) Boccassuolo, Costrignano, Monchio, Savoniero, and Susano.

Palagano borders the following municipalities: Frassinoro, Lama Mocogno, Montefiorino, Polinago, Prignano sulla Secchia, Riolunato, Toano.

== Demographic evolution ==
Historical population

Year	Pop.	±%
1861	2,792	—
1871	3,634	+30.2%
1881	3,882	+6.8%
1901	4,552	+17.3%
1911	4,877	+7.1%

Year	Pop.	±%
1921	5,255	+7.8%
1931	5,165	−1.7%
1936	4,814	−6.8%
1951	4,867	+1.1%
1961	4,022	−17.4%

Year	Pop.	±%
1971	2,798	−30.4%
1981	2,495	−10.8%
1991	2,381	−4.6%
2001	2,466	+3.6%

Source: Data from ISTAT

== Twin towns ==
Palagano is twinned with:

- Carqueiranne, France
