= Biagio Black =

American painter

- Born: California, United States
- Occupation: Artist

Biagio Black is an American artist who is based in New York and Los Angeles. Black is best known for his distinctive large format portraits of fashion icons that include Vivienne Westwood, Kate Moss, Keira Knightley, and Marion Cotillard. Black's work has mostly been featured in Los Angeles and New York City.

His work is characterized by deconstructing his subjects into intricate patterns of flat-fields that appear as a kind of color topography from up-close, yet from a distance, comes together to form a whole image – at times photorealistic and at other times highly stylized.

While living in Paris, Black gained recognition in the fashion industry after completing a video art piece for Kate Moss. Ford Models commissioned Black to do a series of illustrations of their L.A. based models including a portrait of model, Chanel Iman. Printed on Fords Models' comp cards, his unique illustrations gained collector status within the L.A. fashion community. Thereafter, Black selected ten of the illustrations and created 6-ft tall painted versions for a series entitled, "New Faces". Black's “New Faces” along with multiple portraits from other collections was featured in a special exhibition at the Los Angeles MOCA in 2009 during Downtown LA Fashion Week.

Black states he draws inspiration from Warhol, Rauschenberg, Bill Sienkiewicz, punk, movie posters, product design, and Pop Culture.

== Art ==
In 2003, while in Paris and Milan, Black produced and directed video pieces for models Kate Moss and Tetyana Brazhnyk.

In 2004, Ford Models: Los Angeles commissioned Black to do a series of illustrations of their models, including a portrait of the model Chanel Iman. The illustrations were printed on Ford's model comp cards, which gained a collector status within the Los Angeles fashion community.

Ford Models sponsored an art show created by Black to showcase the work. Ten illustrations were selected by Black to be created into 6-foot (1.8 m) tall painted versions for a series entitled, "New Faces". All ten paintings along with mixed media video projections were featured at Montmartre Lounge in Hollywood on March 17, 2005, as part of a special LA Fashion Week event, sponsored by General Motors and Ford Models.

Black's “New Faces” collection was the showcased at the 4th Annual Little Black Dress Gala at the W Hotel Los Angeles in Westwood on June 7, 2005. “Every painting in Biagio’s New Faces exhibit captures the essence of being a woman. Their bold colors and expressive complexions showcase every aspect of a woman’s personality: from the sexy vixen to the girl next door,” said Emmy Cortes, the event organizer in a press release. “I feel that his artwork echoes the range of the classic “little black dress” from the formal gala to the casual dinner with a friend.” Little Black Dress is an annual international event that allows fashion designers the opportunity to raise money for Stop Cancer, the charitable organization chaired by former Paramount Pictures President, Sherry Lansing.

In September 2008, Black’s series, “JUNOESQUE”, created specifically for the 7th Annual Little Black Dress charity event, featured 6-foot tall portraits of celebrities including Keira Knightley, Eva Green, and Marion Cotillard in little black dresses. The Los Angeles Times made mention of Black's work, "Young Hollywood-inspired pop art paintings by L.A. artists Biagio Black..."

In a press release Black stated, “These pieces range from cool to dark dreams. Iconic, distant, soulful. These women are pop culture royalty. The fact that these classism killers are fashionable is inevitable. These iconographic works offer images in simple hi-contrast forms that follow essence,” notes Black.

In 2009 Black received a commission for a portrait of fashion designer Vivienne Westwood, for a special event for Westwood's Anglomania collection at Em&Co in Hollywood. A collection of his work from multiple series was featured in a special exhibition at the Los Angeles MOCA in 2009 during Downtown LA Fashion Week (Oct 13th – Oct 15th).

In 2015, Black completed a portrait of James F. Goldstein, which is displayed at the Sheats Goldstein Residence in Beverly Hills. The Black portrait is part of collection that includes artists James Turrell, Xavier Veilhan, and Bernar Venet.

== Education ==
Studying both engineering and art, Black received his BS in mechanical engineering from The Cooper Union for the Advancement of Arts in Sciences. Immediately after, he began doing innovative work in the world of graphic art and mixed media design. As one of his first high-profile projects, Black created and designed the Who Wants to Be a Millionaire? Flash game for ABC. The success of the game gained Black industry notice leading him to start his own company – Modstar Productions, an interactive agency based in Manhattan. Modstar's client list includes Viacom, Warner Bros., Ford Models, HBO, Def Jam, and Cirque du Soleil.

== Press ==
- "Interview: Biagio Black, POP Goes the Easel", laist.com, LAist, archived from the original on 10 January 2016
- Xenos, Christina (27 February 2016), "Inside John Lautner's Sheats-Goldstein House", SoCalPulse.com, People Magazine
- Silverman, Stephen M., "Runway Model Recovering from Bus Accident", People.com: Celebrity News, People Magazine, archived from the original on 19 March 2008
- Davis, Lawrence, "Little Black Dress Returns to Los Angeles", lasplash.com: Splash Magazines, Splash Magazines
- Weinger, Erin (14 September 2008), "Little Black Dress", Los Angeles Times
