= Pievepelago =

- Comune
- Comune di Pievepelago
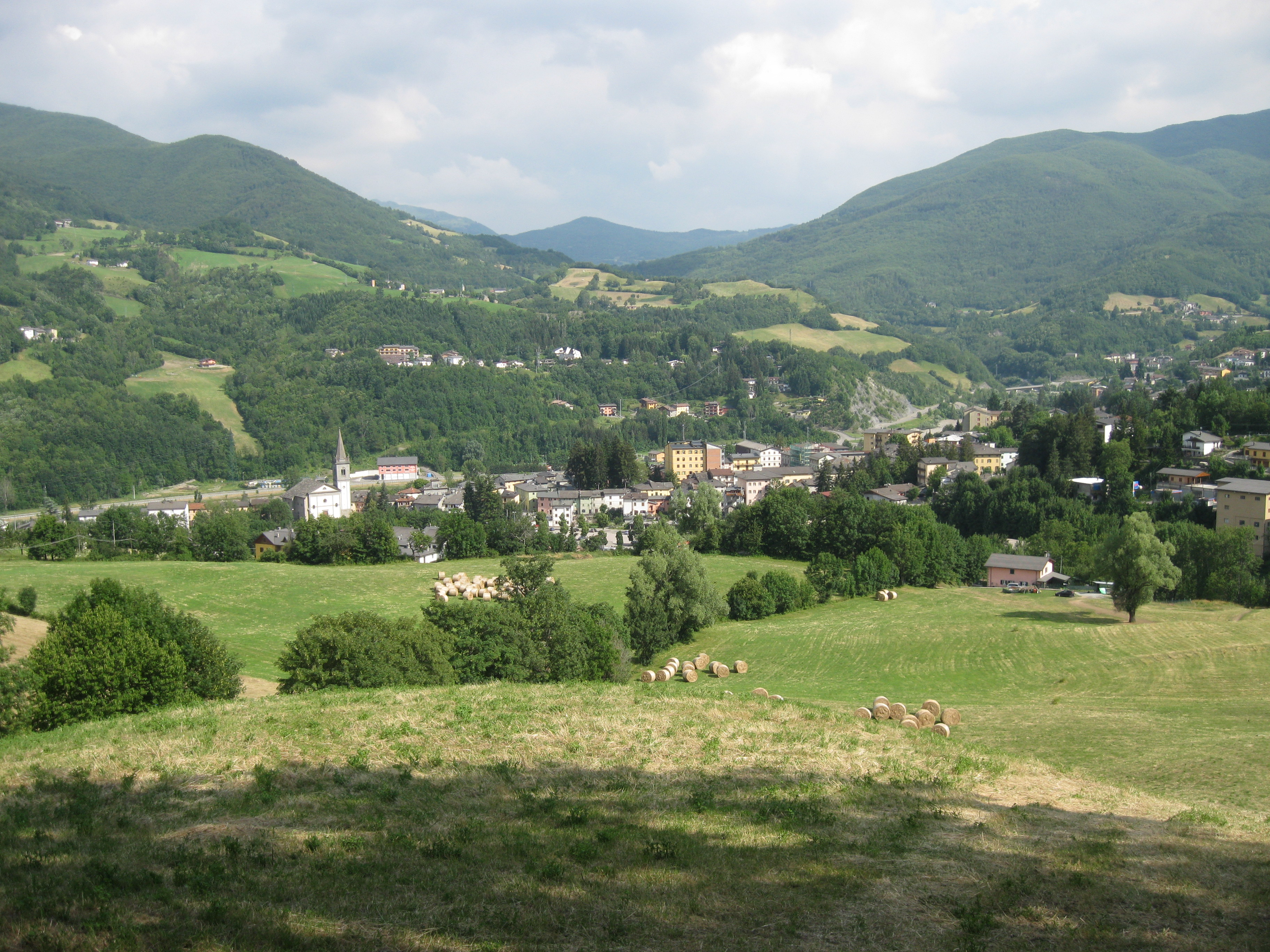
- View of Pievepelago

- Coat of arms

- Location within Italy Location within Emilia-Romagna
- Coordinates: 44°12′N 10°37′E
- Country: Italy
- Region: Emilia-Romagna
- Province: Modena (MO)
- Frazioni: Roccapelago, Sant'Andreapelago, Sant'Annapelago, Tagliole

Government
  - Mayor: Corrado Ferroni

Area
  - Total: 76.54 km^{2} (29.55 sq mi)
- Elevation: 701 m (2,300 ft)

Population (31 July 2015)
  - Total: 2,228
  - Density: 29.11/km^{2} (75.39/sq mi)
- Demonym: Pievaroli
- Time zone: UTC+1 (CET)
  - Summer (DST): UTC+2 (CEST)
- Postal code: 41027
- Dialing code: 0536
- Patron saint: St. Mary and St. Theodore
- Saint day: 15 August and First Sunday in September
- Website: Official website

Pievepelago (Frignanese: La Piéva or Piêvpèlegh) is a comune (municipality) in the Province of Modena in the Italian region of Emilia-Romagna in the heart of the northern Apennine Mountains. Situated on the Scoltenna River, in a mountain valley, it is a tourist resort crossed by the Via Vandelli.

It is about 70 kilometres (43 mi) southwest of Bologna, about 60 kilometres (37 mi) southwest of Modena, about 60 kilometres (37 mi) north of Lucca and about 70 kilometres (43 mi) northwest of Florence. It has a population of about 2200 inhabitants, spread among the main town and its frazioni, Sant'Annapelago, Roccapelago, Sant'Andreapelago and Tagliole.

== History ==
Pievepelago is of medieval origins. The first document which attests the presence of a village in the valley belongs to the 10th century. The name of the village came from the presence of the pieve (rural church) of Santa Maria Assunta since its early years. In the 18th century, two roads, Via Vandelli and Giardini, were built in order to join Tuscany to the north of Italy by cutting across the Apennines. That development increased trade a lot in the valley, and brought the town greater prestige and population. During World War II Pievepelago was on the Gothic line, and many inhabitants fought as partisans to free the valley. A monument celebrating the victims of the war is located in the center of town.

== Sport ==
Pievepelago is a local mountain outdoor activity centre. In winter the most practised sport is skiing, in the ski resort of Sant'Annapelago or in the larger ones of Abetone and Monte Cimone. In summer trekking can be performed in the Frignano Wild Park. The excursions usually starts at the glacial lakes in Tagliole Valley up to the peaks of Monte Riolunato and Monte Giovo, which is the second highest mountain in the region.

== Nature ==
This territory also contains a variety of fauna like, such as golden eagles. Near Pievepelago there is the Santo Lake, an area of naturalistic interest and also a starting point for excursions.

== Museums ==
In 2010 some mummified human remains were found in the crypt of the church in Roccapelago. Today the local castle houses the Museo delle Mummie where this archaeological find is exhibited.

== People ==
- Palmiro Serafini (born 1945), ski mountaineer and cross-country skier
