= Monte Cimone =

Mountain in Italy

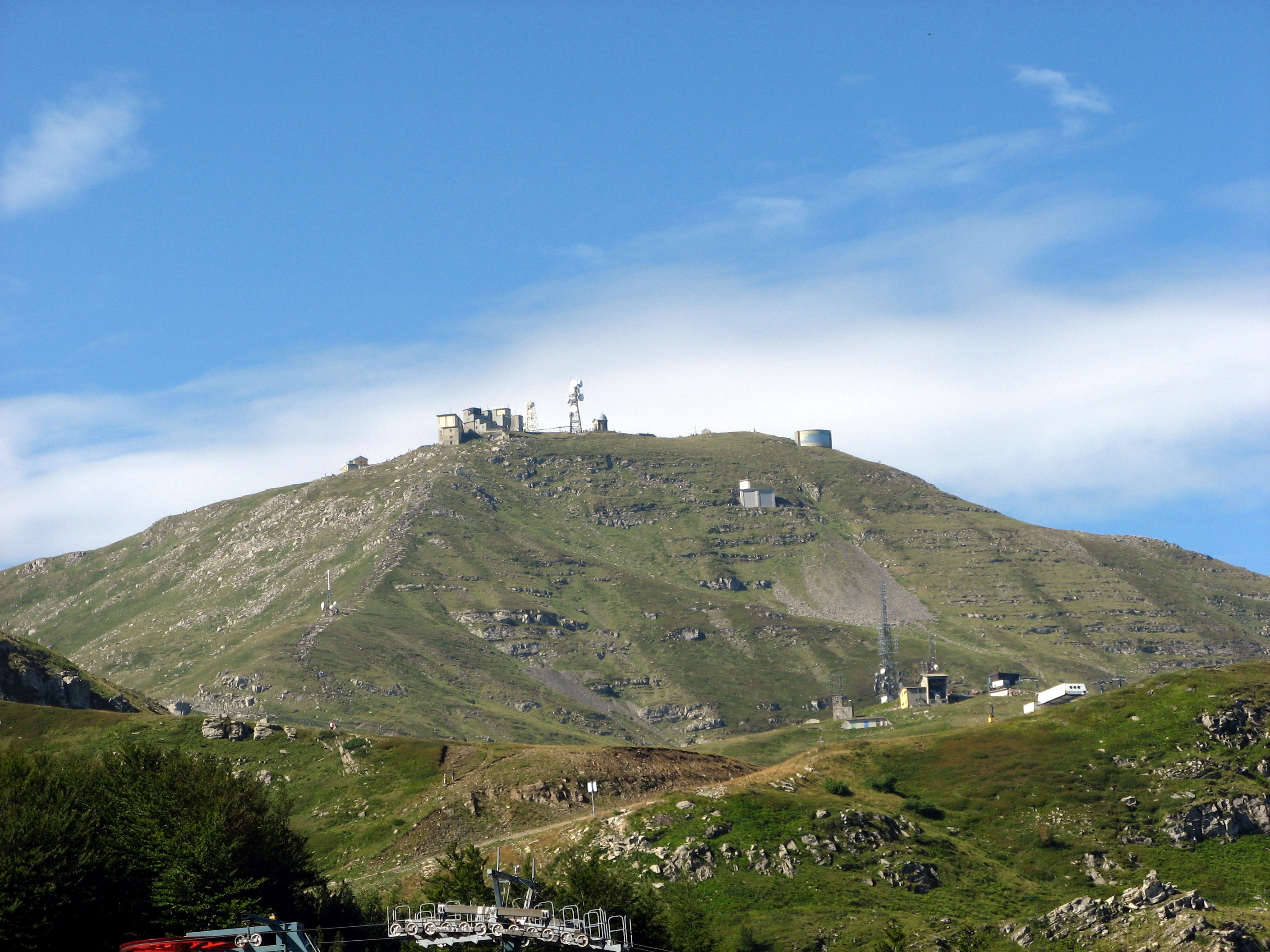
- Monte Cimone

Highest point
- Elevation: 2,165 m (7,103 ft)
- Prominence: 1,577 m (5,174 ft)
- Isolation: 168.35 km (104.61 mi)
- Listing: Ultra
- Coordinates: 44°11′38″N 10°42′05″E

Geography
- Location within Italy
- Location: Emilia-Romagna, Italy
- Parent range: Tuscan-Emilian Apennines

Climbing
- First ascent: 1569, by count Guidinello Montecuccoli

Monte Cimone is the highest mountain in the northern Apennines, of Italy.

== Geography ==
The mountain has an elevation of 2,165 m and is also the highest point in the Emilia-Romagna region of Italy.

It encompasses the comuni of Fiumalbo, Sestola, Fanano and Riolunato in the province of Modena. Its interior houses a military structure; for this reason, during the Cold War, access to the peak was forbidden.

During World War II it was a German radar site and anti-aircraft gun battery. Later it was used as a communications relay site by the U.S. Air Force, until removed in 2008.

=== Climate ===
Due to altitude, the climate is subarctic (Köppen: Dfc), similar to other high mountains in the Alps. The annual average temperature is 3.5 °C (38.3 °F), the hottest month in August is 12.2 °C (54.0 °F), and the coldest month is −3.6 °C (25.5 °F) in February. The annual precipitation is 490.7 millimetres (19.32 in), of which October is the wettest with 74.07 millimetres (2.92 in), while April is the driest with only 19.7 millimetres (0.78 in).

Climate data for Monte Cimone, elevation: 2,165 m or 7,103 ft, 1991-2020 normals, extremes 1935–present
Month	Jan	Feb	Mar	Apr	May	Jun	Jul	Aug	Sep	Oct	Nov	Dec	Year
Record high °C (°F)	11.8 (53.2)	12.0 (53.6)	11.2 (52.2)	13.0 (55.4)	19.0 (66.2)	22.0 (71.6)	24.4 (75.9)	24.0 (75.2)	21.2 (70.2)	17.2 (63.0)	17.0 (62.6)	12.6 (54.7)	24.4 (75.9)
Mean daily maximum °C (°F)	−1.0 (30.2)	−1.6 (29.1)	0.6 (33.1)	2.8 (37.0)	7.3 (45.1)	12.0 (53.6)	14.9 (58.8)	14.8 (58.6)	9.8 (49.6)	6.7 (44.1)	2.4 (36.3)	−0.3 (31.5)	5.7 (42.3)
Daily mean °C (°F)	−3.0 (26.6)	−3.6 (25.5)	−1.6 (29.1)	0.7 (33.3)	5.0 (41.0)	9.5 (49.1)	12.1 (53.8)	12.2 (54.0)	7.5 (45.5)	4.5 (40.1)	0.5 (32.9)	−2.4 (27.7)	3.5 (38.3)
Mean daily minimum °C (°F)	−5.0 (23.0)	−5.8 (21.6)	−3.5 (25.7)	−1.1 (30.0)	2.9 (37.2)	7.2 (45.0)	9.7 (49.5)	10.0 (50.0)	5.5 (41.9)	2.6 (36.7)	−1.3 (29.7)	−4.2 (24.4)	1.4 (34.5)
Record low °C (°F)	−22.2 (−8.0)	−21.8 (−7.2)	−21.0 (−5.8)	−14.8 (5.4)	−10.0 (14.0)	−4.6 (23.7)	−1.4 (29.5)	−1.8 (28.8)	−5.8 (21.6)	−11.2 (11.8)	−17.0 (1.4)	−20.0 (−4.0)	−22.2 (−8.0)
Average precipitation mm (inches)	24.7 (0.97)	30.0 (1.18)	23.7 (0.93)	19.7 (0.78)	34.0 (1.34)	43.6 (1.72)	46.6 (1.83)	41.3 (1.63)	66.8 (2.63)	74.1 (2.92)	58.4 (2.30)	27.9 (1.10)	490.7 (19.32)
Average precipitation days (≥ 1.0 mm)	4.50	5.57	4.64	5.14	6.34	5.75	5.00	5.47	7.10	7.77	8.00	5.48	70.76
Average relative humidity (%)	68.8	71.0	74.6	76.7	75.6	72.5	69.5	69.6	75.6	74.6	75.4	72.6	73.0
Average dew point °C (°F)	−8.7 (16.3)	−8.7 (16.3)	−5.7 (21.7)	−2.8 (27.0)	1.1 (34.0)	4.7 (40.5)	6.6 (43.9)	6.7 (44.1)	3.4 (38.1)	-0.0 (32.0)	−3.9 (25.0)	−7.2 (19.0)	−1.2 (29.8)
Mean monthly sunshine hours	185.1	192.4	226.3	191.4	204.6	222.3	244.3	239.6	198.3	203.7	155.7	168.3	2,431.9
Source 1: NOAA
Source 2: Temperature estreme in Toscana

== Skiing ==
It is a frequented winter ski resort. In the resort there are 31 ski trails for a total length of more than 50 km (the longest trail is 3,6 km) served by 26 lifts. Ski season starts usually at the beginning of December (often in the last week end of November) and ends in the middle of April. The resort is composed by six different area (Passo del Lupo, Polle, Cimoncino, Lago Ninfa, Montecreto and Pian del Falco) well-linked by trails and lifts. Famous trails are the no. 9-Nord Funivia (red trail, length 1,9 km), no. 10-Direttissima (black trail, length 1,7 km), no. 17-Sette Fontane (red/black trail, length 2,7 km) and no. 5-Delle Aquile (red-black trail, length 2,7 km). The resort is frequented also by snowboarders as it hosts a large snowpark in Passo del Lupo's area (with a half pipe 85 mt length, woops, two jump rail, three kink box, three box, three C box, four double tube, one triple kink box, one kink, one rainbow box, one triple kink, kicker three-12m, one-16m, one spine 20m 3 box in line 6m), plus two minor snowparks in the areas of Lago Ninfa and Polle.

== See also ==
- List of European ultra prominent peaks
- List of Italian regions by highest point
- Lake della Ninfa
