= Sestola =

- Comune
- Comune di Sestola
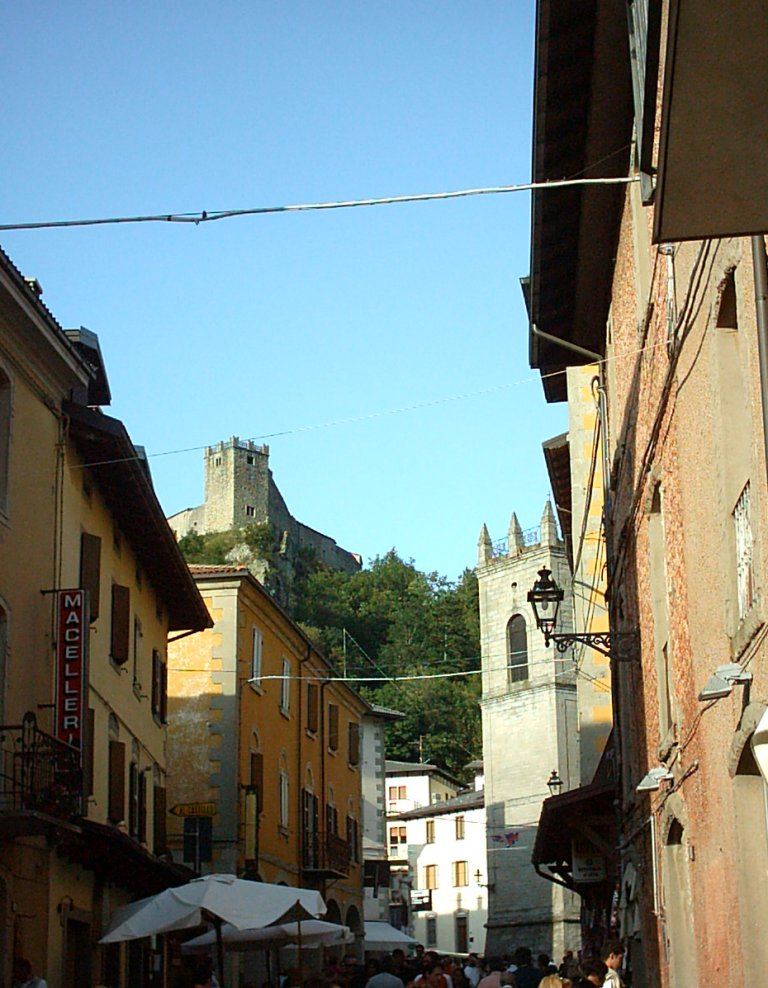

- Location within Italy Location within Emilia-Romagna
- Coordinates: 44°14′N 10°46′E
- Country: Italy
- Region: Emilia-Romagna
- Province: Modena (MO)
- Frazioni: Casine, Castellaro, Rocchetta Sandri, Roncoscaglia, Vesale

Government
  - Mayor: Magnani Fabio

Area
  - Total: 52.47 km^{2} (20.26 sq mi)
- Elevation: 1,020 m (3,350 ft)

Population (31 December 2014)
  - Total: 2,500
  - Density: 48/km^{2} (120/sq mi)
- Demonym: Sestolesi
- Time zone: UTC+1 (CET)
  - Summer (DST): UTC+2 (CEST)
- Postal code: 41029
- Dialing code: 0536
- Website: Official website

Sestola (Sestolese: Sèstula; Frignanese: Sèstla) is a comune (municipality) in the province of Modena, in the Italian region of Emilia-Romagna, located about 60 kilometres (37 mi) southwest of Bologna and about 50 kilometres (31 mi) southwest of Modena. It is located near the Monte Cimone and other mountains of the northern Apennines separating Emilia and Tuscany.

Sestola borders the following municipalities: Fanano, Fiumalbo, Lizzano in Belvedere, Montecreto, Montese, Pavullo nel Frignano, Riolunato.

== Main sights ==
- Fortress, rebuilt in the 16th century but dating to several centuries before.
- Giardino Botanico Alpino "Esperia"
- San Nicola di Bari church

== Climate ==
Climate data for Sestola (1991–2020)
Month	Jan	Feb	Mar	Apr	May	Jun	Jul	Aug	Sep	Oct	Nov	Dec	Year
Mean daily maximum °C (°F)	4.8 (40.6)	5.8 (42.4)	9.7 (49.5)	12.7 (54.9)	18.1 (64.6)	22.0 (71.6)	25.1 (77.2)	24.9 (76.8)	19.4 (66.9)	14.0 (57.2)	9.0 (48.2)	5.1 (41.2)	14.2 (57.6)
Daily mean °C (°F)	2.0 (35.6)	2.4 (36.3)	5.9 (42.6)	8.9 (48.0)	13.8 (56.8)	17.7 (63.9)	20.5 (68.9)	20.5 (68.9)	15.5 (59.9)	10.9 (51.6)	6.3 (43.3)	2.6 (36.7)	10.6 (51.0)
Mean daily minimum °C (°F)	−0.9 (30.4)	−1.1 (30.0)	2.1 (35.8)	5.1 (41.2)	9.5 (49.1)	13.4 (56.1)	15.9 (60.6)	16.0 (60.8)	11.6 (52.9)	7.8 (46.0)	3.5 (38.3)	0.1 (32.2)	6.9 (44.4)
Average precipitation mm (inches)	105 (4.1)	107 (4.2)	111 (4.4)	144 (5.7)	113 (4.4)	99 (3.9)	68 (2.7)	89 (3.5)	118 (4.6)	163 (6.4)	180 (7.1)	133 (5.2)	1,430 (56.2)
Average precipitation days (≥ 1.0 mm)	9	8	9	11	10	8	5	6	8	10	13	10	107
Source 1: Istituto Superiore per la Protezione e la Ricerca Ambientale (precipitation 1951–1980)
Source 2: Climi e viaggi (precipitation days)

== See also ==
- San Giovanni Battista, Roncoscaglia
