= Abetone Cutigliano =

- Comune
- Comune di Abetone Cutigliano
- Location within Italy Location within Tuscany
- Coordinates: 44°06′01″N 10°45′23″E
- Country: Italy
- Region: Tuscany
- Province: Pistoia (PT)
- Frazioni: Abetone, Bicchiere, Casotti-Ponte Sestaione, Cecchetto, Cutigliano (municipal seat), Doganaccia, Faidello, Fontana Vaccaia, La Secchia, Le Regine, Melo, Pian degli Ontani, Pian dei Sisi, Pian di Novello, Pianosinatico, Rivoreta, Val di Luce

Government
  - Mayor: Diego Petrucci

Area
  - Total: 74.94 km^{2} (28.93 sq mi)

Population (30 June 2017)
  - Total: 2,083
  - Density: 27.80/km^{2} (71.99/sq mi)
- Time zone: UTC+1 (CET)
  - Summer (DST): UTC+2 (CEST)
- Postal code: 51024
- Dialing code: 0573
- Website: Official website

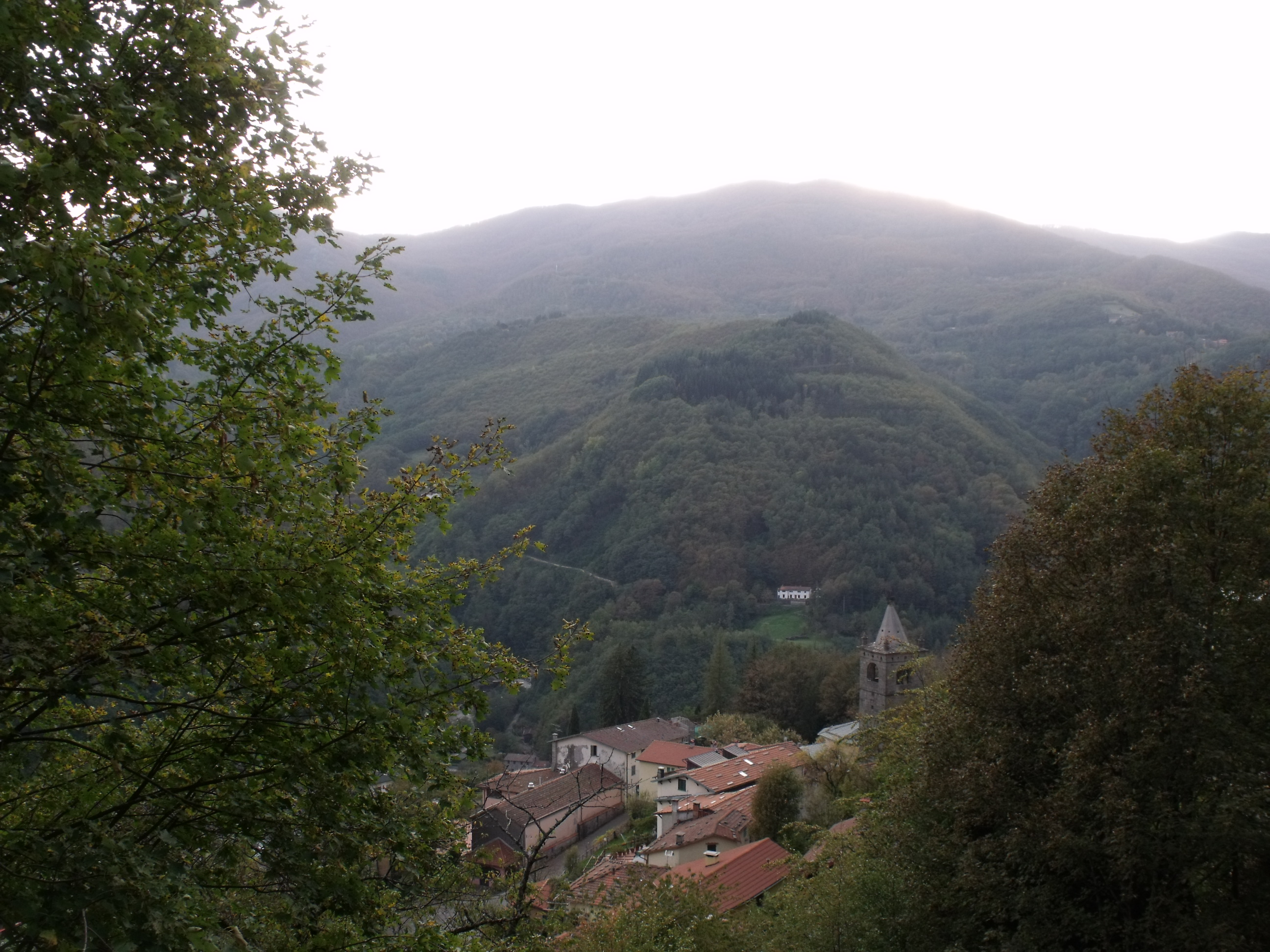
Panorama of Cutigliano

Abetone Cutigliano is a comune (municipality) in the Province of Pistoia in the Italian region of Tuscany. It was established in 2017 through the merger of the former communes of Abetone and Cutigliano.
