= Electromagnetism =

Fundamental interaction between charged particles

In physics, electromagnetism is an interaction that occurs between particles with electric charge via electromagnetic fields. The electromagnetic force is one of the four fundamental forces of nature. It is the dominant force in the interactions of atoms and molecules. Electromagnetism describes and relates the three distinct but closely intertwined phenomena of electricity, magnetism, and optics. In the study of electromagnetism these phenomena are described by the 3 sub-disciplines: electrostatics, magnetostatics, and electrodynamics.

The electromagnetic force is responsible for many chemical and physical phenomena observed in daily life. The electrostatic attraction between atomic nuclei and their electrons holds atoms together. Electric forces also allow different atoms to combine into molecules. Meanwhile, magnetic interactions between the spin and angular momentum magnetic moments of electrons also play a role in chemical reactivity; such relationships are studied in spin chemistry. Electromagnetism also plays several crucial roles in modern technology: electrical energy production, transformation and distribution; light, heat, and sound production and detection; fiber optic and wireless communication; sensors; computation; electrolysis; electroplating; and mechanical motors and actuators.

Electromagnetism has been studied since ancient times to explain the electric phenomena of lightning and static electricity and the magnetic phenomenon of the attraction between magnetized pieces of iron ore and of compasses. In the 18th and 19th centuries scientists developed the mathematical relationships between these phenomena and electric charges and currents. They also showed that electrical and magnetic phenomena were related and could create self-sustaining electromagnetic waves which forms visible light and other forms of electromagnetic radiation including Gamma-rays, x-rays, ultraviolet, visible, infrared radiation, microwaves and radio waves.

In the modern era, scientists continue to refine the theory of electromagnetism to account for the effects of modern physics, including quantum mechanics and relativity. The theoretical implications of electromagnetism, particularly the requirement that observations remain consistent when viewed from various moving frames of reference (relativistic electromagnetism) and the establishment of the speed of light based on properties of the medium of propagation (permeability and permittivity), helped inspire Einstein's theory of special relativity in 1905. Quantum electrodynamics (QED) modifies Maxwell's equations to be consistent with the quantized nature of matter. In QED, changes in the electromagnetic field are expressed in terms of discrete excitations, particles known as photons, the quanta of light.

Mathematically, electromagnetism is described by electromagnetic fields. These are quantities that describe the electrical (electric field) and magnetic (magnetic field) influence at a given location and time.

== A fundamental force ==
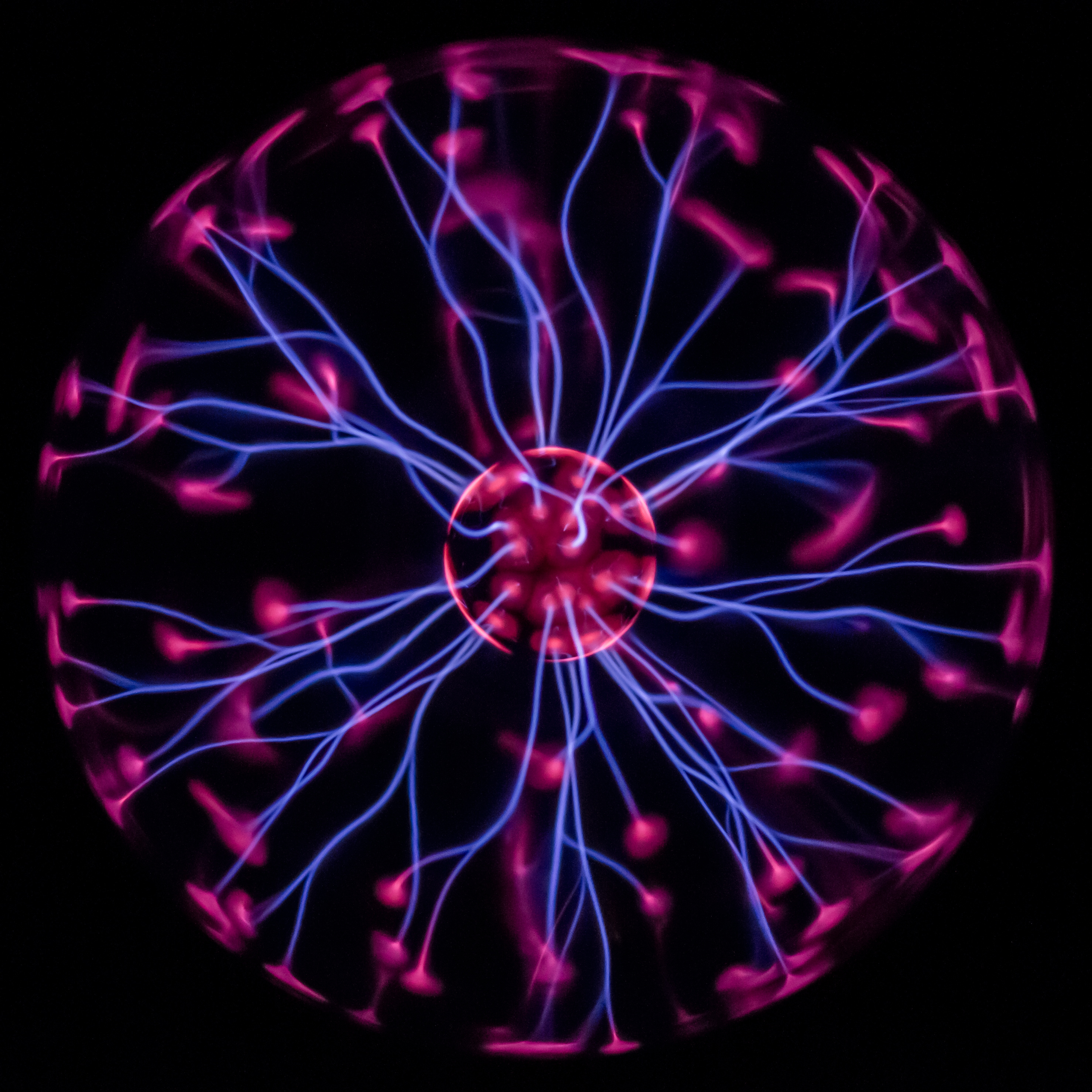
Electromagnetic interactions are responsible for the glowing filaments in this plasma globe.

The electromagnetic force is the second strongest of the four known fundamental forces and has unlimited range. All other forces, known as non-fundamental forces (e.g., friction, contact forces) are derived from the four fundamental forces. At high energy, the weak force and electromagnetic force are unified as a single interaction called the electroweak interaction.

Most of the forces involved in interactions between atoms are explained by electromagnetic forces between electrically charged atomic nuclei and electrons. The electromagnetic force is also involved in all forms of chemical phenomena.

Electromagnetism explains how materials carry momentum despite being composed of individual particles and empty space. The forces we experience when "pushing" or "pulling" ordinary material objects result from intermolecular forces between individual molecules in our bodies and in the objects.

The effective forces generated by the momentum of electrons' movement is a necessary part of understanding atomic and intermolecular interactions. As electrons move between interacting atoms, they carry momentum with them. As a collection of electrons becomes more confined, their minimum momentum necessarily increases due to the Pauli exclusion principle. The behavior of matter at the molecular scale, including its density, is determined by the balance between the electromagnetic force and the force generated by the exchange of momentum carried by the electrons themselves.

== Electromagnetic fields ==
The phenomena of electromagnetism is described mathematically using electromagnetic fields. An electromagnetic field (also EM field) is a physical field, varying in space and time, that represents the electric and magnetic influences generated by and acting upon electric charges. The field at any point in space and time can be regarded as a combination of an electric field and a magnetic field. Because of the interrelationship between the fields, a disturbance in the electric field can create a disturbance in the magnetic field which in turn affects the electric field, leading to an oscillation that propagates through space, known as an electromagnetic wave.

There are 6 mathematical quantities which are used to describe electromagnetic fields in 3 distinct cases. The electric field, E, and magnetic flux density, B are used to describe the electromagnetic fields in cases where all the charges are known directly such as the electromagnetic field in a vacuum. To describe the case where the charges inside of a material respond to applied electric and magnetic fields, it is useful to define the electric displacement field, D and magnetic field strength, H, in addition to E and B. Finally, it is sometimes useful to describe electromagnetic fields not in terms of force but in terms of potential energy and momentum. In this case, the electromagnetic field is represented by the electric potential, V, and the magnetic vector potential, A, respectively.

Lorentz force F on a charged particle (of charge q) in motion (instantaneous velocity v). The E field and B field vary in space and time.

=== Force on an electric charge due to electromagnetic fields ===
The force, F. on a charge particle of charge q moving at speed v in an electromagnetic field is given by the Lorentz force(SI definition of quantities (Note: In SI units, B is measured in teslas (symbol: T). In Gaussian-cgs units, B is measured in gauss (symbol: G). H is measured in amperes per metre (A/m) in SI units, and in oersteds (Oe) in cgs units.)): $\mathbf{F} = q \left(\mathbf{E} + \mathbf{v} \times \mathbf{B}\right)$

Here, × is the vector cross product, and all quantities in bold are vectors.

The Lorentz force can be used to define both the electric field E and the magnetic flux density B.

=== Electromagnetic fields in matter ===
When dealing with electromagnetic fields in matter it is often useful to introduce 2 other fields, in addition to E and B. Since matter is made of particles with both electric charge and intrinsic magnetic moment it responds to an applied electromagnetic field to produce its own electromagnetic field. The details are complicated but often can be described by introducing an electric displacement field, D to complement E and a magnetic field strength, H, to complement B.

=== Electric potential formulation ===
In advanced formulations of electromagnetism and to simplify certain calculations it is often useful to reformulate the electromagnetic field in terms of electric potential energy and momentum instead of force. Here, the electromagnetic fields of interest are the electric potential, V, and the magnetic vector potential A. These are related to E and B by:
$$\begin{align}
\mathbf{E} &= - \nabla V - \frac { \partial \mathbf{A} } { \partial t } \\[1ex]
\mathbf{B} &= \nabla \times \mathbf{A}
\end{align}$$
where ∇ is the gradient, ∇⋅ is the divergence, and ∇× is the curl.

== Electrostatics ==
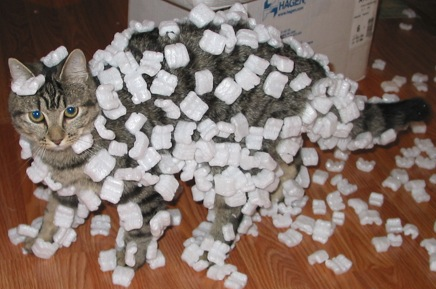
Foam peanuts clinging to a cat's fur due to static electricity. The cat's fur becomes charged due to the triboelectric effect. The electric field of the charged fur causes polarization of the molecules of the foam due to electrostatic induction, resulting in a slight attraction of the light plastic pieces to the fur. This effect is also the cause of static cling in clothes.

Electrostatics is a branch of physics that studies slow-moving or stationary electric charges on macroscopic objects where quantum effects can be neglected. Under these circumstances, the electric field, electric potential, and the charge density are related without complications from magnetic effects.

Since classical antiquity, it has been known that some materials, such as amber, attract lightweight particles after rubbing. The Greek word ḗlektron (ἤλεκτρον), meaning 'amber', was thus the root of the word electricity. Electrostatic phenomena arise from the forces that electric charges exert on each other. Such forces are described by Coulomb's law.

There are many examples of electrostatic phenomena, from those as simple as the attraction of plastic wrap to one's hand after it is removed from a package, to the apparently spontaneous explosion of grain silos, the damage of electronic components during manufacturing, and photocopier and laser printer operation.

== Magnetostatics ==
Magnetostatics is the study of magnetic fields in systems where the currents are steady (not changing with time). It is the magnetic analogue of electrostatics, where the charges are stationary. The magnetization need not be static; the equations of magnetostatics can be used to predict fast magnetic switching events that occur on time scales of nanoseconds or less. Magnetostatics is even a good approximation when the currents are not static – as long as the currents do not alternate rapidly. Magnetostatics is widely used in applications of micromagnetics such as models of magnetic storage devices as in computer memory.

== Electrodynamics ==
In 1600, William Gilbert proposed, in his De Magnete, that electricity and magnetism, while both capable of causing attraction and repulsion of objects, were distinct effects. Mariners had noticed that lightning strikes had the ability to disturb a compass needle. The link between lightning and electricity was not confirmed until Benjamin Franklin's proposed experiments in 1752 were conducted on 10 May 1752 by Thomas-François Dalibard of France using a 40-foot-tall (12 m) iron rod instead of a kite and he successfully extracted electrical sparks from a cloud.

One of the first to discover and publish a link between human-made electric currents and magnetism was Gian Romagnosi, who in 1802 noticed that connecting a wire across a voltaic pile deflected a nearby compass needle. However, the effect did not become widely known until 1820, when Ørsted performed a similar experiment. Ørsted's work influenced Ampère to conduct further experiments, which eventually gave rise to a new area of physics: electrodynamics. By determining a force law for the interaction between elements of electric current, Ampère placed the subject on a solid mathematical foundation.

A theory of electromagnetism, known as classical electromagnetism, was developed by several physicists during the period between 1820 and 1873, when James Clerk Maxwell's treatise was published, which unified previous developments into a single theory, proposing that light was an electromagnetic wave propagating in the luminiferous ether. In classical electromagnetism, the behavior of the electromagnetic field is described by a set of equations known as Maxwell's equations, and the electromagnetic force is given by the Lorentz force law.

The general solutions to Maxwell's equations are given by Jefimenko's equations, which provide the expressions for the electric and magnetic fields created by an arbitrary distribution of electric charges and currents. These equations notably take into account the fact that the fields propagate at the speed of light c.

One of the peculiarities of classical electromagnetism is that it is difficult to reconcile with classical mechanics, but it is compatible with special relativity. According to Maxwell's equations, the speed of light in vacuum is a universal constant that is dependent only on the electrical permittivity and magnetic permeability of free space. This violates Galilean invariance, a long-standing cornerstone of classical mechanics. One way to reconcile the two theories (electromagnetism and classical mechanics) is to assume the existence of a luminiferous aether through which the light propagates. However, subsequent experimental efforts failed to detect the presence of the aether. After important contributions of Hendrik Lorentz and Henri Poincaré, in 1905, Albert Einstein solved the problem with the introduction of special relativity, which replaced classical kinematics with a new theory of kinematics compatible with classical electromagnetism. (For more information, see History of special relativity.)

In addition, relativity theory implies that in moving frames of reference, a magnetic field transforms to a field with a nonzero electric component and conversely, a moving electric field transforms to a nonzero magnetic component, thus firmly showing that the phenomena are two sides of the same coin. Hence the term "electromagnetism". (For more information, see Classical electromagnetism and special relativity and Covariant formulation of classical electromagnetism.)

Today a few problems in electromagnetism remain unsolved. These include: the lack of magnetic monopoles, Abraham–Minkowski controversy, the location in space of the electromagnetic field energy, and the mechanism by which some organisms can sense electric and magnetic fields.

=== Extension to nonlinear phenomena ===
The Maxwell equations are linear, in that a change in the sources (the charges and currents) results in a proportional change of the fields. Nonlinear dynamics can occur when electromagnetic fields couple to matter that follows nonlinear dynamical laws. This is studied, for example, in the subject of magnetohydrodynamics, which combines Maxwell theory with the Navier–Stokes equations. Another branch of electromagnetism dealing with nonlinearity is nonlinear optics.

== Quantities and units ==
Here is a list of common units related to electromagnetism:

- ampere (electric current, SI unit)
- coulomb (electric charge)
- farad (capacitance)
- henry (inductance)
- ohm (resistance)
- siemens (conductance)
- tesla (magnetic flux density)
- volt (electric potential)
- watt (power)
- weber (magnetic flux)

In the electromagnetic CGS system, electric current is a fundamental quantity defined via Ampère's law and takes the permeability as a dimensionless quantity (relative permeability) whose value in vacuum is unity. As a consequence, the square of the speed of light appears explicitly in some of the equations interrelating quantities in this system.

SI electromagnetism quantities and units
Symbol	Name of quantity	Unit name	Symbol	Base units
E	energy	joule	J = C⋅V = W⋅s	kg⋅m^{2}⋅s^{−2}
Q	electric charge	coulomb	C	A⋅s
I	electric current	ampere	A = C/s = W/V	A
J	electric current density	ampere per square metre	A/m^{2}	A⋅m^{−2}
U, ΔV; Δϕ; E, ξ	potential difference; voltage; electromotive force	volt	V = J/C	kg⋅m^{2}⋅s^{−3}⋅A^{−1}
R; Z; X	electric resistance; impedance; reactance	ohm	Ω = V/A	kg⋅m^{2}⋅s^{−3}⋅A^{−2}
ρ	resistivity	ohm metre	Ω⋅m	kg⋅m^{3}⋅s^{−3}⋅A^{−2}
P	electric power	watt	W = V⋅A	kg⋅m^{2}⋅s^{−3}
C	capacitance	farad	F = C/V	kg^{−1}⋅m^{−2}⋅A^{2}⋅s^{4}
Φ_{E}	electric flux	volt metre	V⋅m	kg⋅m^{3}⋅s^{−3}⋅A^{−1}
E	electric field strength	volt per metre	V/m = N/C	kg⋅m⋅A^{−1}⋅s^{−3}
D	electric displacement field	coulomb per square metre	C/m^{2}	A⋅s⋅m^{−2}
ε	permittivity	farad per metre	F/m	kg^{−1}⋅m^{−3}⋅A^{2}⋅s^{4}
χ_{e}	electric susceptibility	(dimensionless)	1	1
p	electric dipole moment	coulomb metre	C⋅m	A⋅s⋅m
G; Y; B	conductance; admittance; susceptance	siemens	S = Ω^{−1}	kg^{−1}⋅m^{−2}⋅s^{3}⋅A^{2}
κ, γ, σ	conductivity	siemens per metre	S/m	kg^{−1}⋅m^{−3}⋅s^{3}⋅A^{2}
B	magnetic flux density, magnetic induction	tesla	T = Wb/m^{2} = N⋅A^{−1}⋅m^{−1}	kg⋅s^{−2}⋅A^{−1}
Φ, Φ_{M}, Φ_{B}	magnetic flux	weber	Wb = V⋅s	kg⋅m^{2}⋅s^{−2}⋅A^{−1}
H	magnetic field strength	ampere per metre	A/m	A⋅m^{−1}
F	magnetomotive force	ampere	A = Wb/H	A
R	magnetic reluctance	inverse henry	H^{−1} = A/Wb	kg^{−1}⋅m^{−2}⋅s^{2}⋅A^{2}
P	magnetic permeance	henry	H = Wb/A	kg⋅m^{2}⋅s^{–2}⋅A^{–2}
L, M	inductance	henry	H = Wb/A = V⋅s/A	kg⋅m^{2}⋅s^{−2}⋅A^{−2}
μ	permeability	henry per metre	H/m	kg⋅m⋅s^{−2}⋅A^{−2}
χ	magnetic susceptibility	(dimensionless)	1	1
m	magnetic dipole moment	ampere square meter	A⋅m^{2} = J⋅T^{−1}	A⋅m^{2}
σ	mass magnetization	ampere square meter per kilogram	A⋅m^{2}/kg	A⋅m^{2}⋅kg^{−1}

Formulas for physical laws of electromagnetism (such as Maxwell's equations) need to be adjusted depending on what system of units one uses. This is because there is no one-to-one correspondence between electromagnetic units in SI and those in CGS, as is the case for mechanical units. Furthermore, within CGS, there are several plausible choices of electromagnetic units, leading to different unit "sub-systems", including Gaussian, "ESU", "EMU", and Heaviside–Lorentz. Among these choices, Gaussian units are the most common today, and in fact the phrase "CGS units" is often used to refer specifically to CGS-Gaussian units.

== Applications ==
The theory of electromagnetism is used to understand and design electric circuits, magnetic circuits, and semiconductor devices.

== History ==
=== Ancient world ===
Investigation into electromagnetic phenomena began about 5,000 years ago. There is evidence that the ancient Chinese, Mayan, and potentially even Egyptian civilizations knew that the naturally magnetic mineral magnetite had attractive properties, and many incorporated it into their art and architecture. Ancient people were also aware of lightning and static electricity, although they had no idea of the mechanisms behind these phenomena. The Greek philosopher Thales of Miletus discovered around 600 B.C.E. that amber could acquire an electric charge when it was rubbed with cloth, which allowed it to pick up light objects such as pieces of straw. Thales also experimented with the ability of magnetic rocks to attract one another, and hypothesized that this phenomenon might be connected to the attractive power of amber, foreshadowing the deep connections between electricity and magnetism that would be discovered over 2,000 years later. Despite all this investigation, ancient civilizations had no understanding of the mathematical basis of electromagnetism, and often analyzed its impacts through the lens of religion rather than science (lightning, for instance, was considered to be a creation of the gods in many cultures).

=== 19th century ===
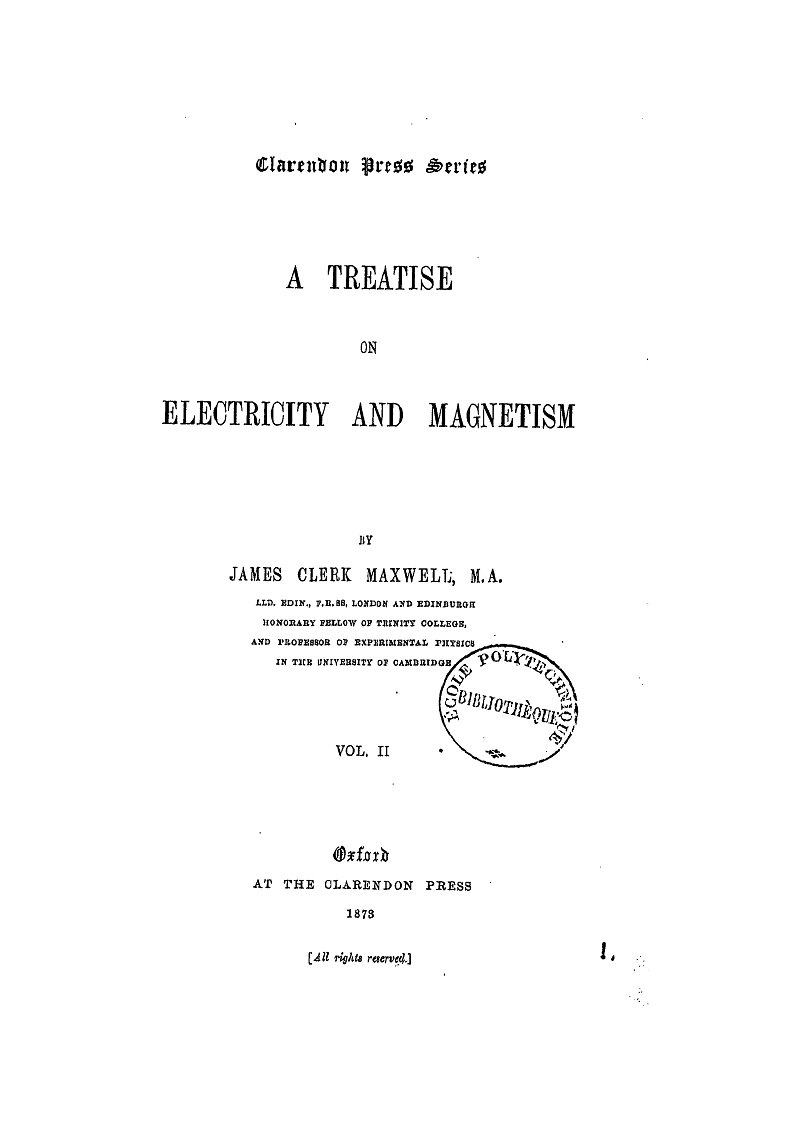
Cover of A Treatise on Electricity and Magnetism

Electricity and magnetism were originally considered to be two separate forces. This view changed with the publication of James Clerk Maxwell's 1873 A Treatise on Electricity and Magnetism in which the interactions of positive and negative charges were shown to be mediated by one force. There are four main effects resulting from these interactions, all of which have been clearly demonstrated by experiments:

1. Electric charges attract or repel one another with a force inversely proportional to the square of the distance between them (Coulomb's law): opposite charges attract, like charges repel.
2. Magnetic poles (or states of polarization at individual points) attract or repel one another in a manner similar to positive and negative charges and always exist as pairs: every north pole is yoked to a south pole.
3. An electric current inside a wire creates a corresponding circumferential magnetic field outside the wire. Its direction (clockwise or counter-clockwise) depends on the direction of the current in the wire.
4. A current is induced in a loop of wire when it is moved toward or away from a magnetic field, or a magnet is moved towards or away from it; the direction of current depends on that of the movement.

In April 1820, Hans Christian Ørsted observed that an electrical current in a wire caused a nearby compass needle to move. At the time of discovery, Ørsted did not suggest any satisfactory explanation of the phenomenon, nor did he try to represent the phenomenon in a mathematical framework. However, three months later he began more intensive investigations. Soon thereafter he published his findings, proving that an electric current produces a magnetic field as it flows through a wire. The CGS unit of magnetic induction (oersted) is named in honor of his contributions to the field of electromagnetism. His findings influenced French physicist André-Marie Ampère's developments of a single mathematical form to represent the magnetic forces between current-carrying conductors.

This unification, which was observed by Michael Faraday, extended by James Clerk Maxwell, and partially reformulated by Oliver Heaviside and Heinrich Hertz, is one of the key accomplishments of 19th-century mathematical physics. It has had far-reaching consequences, one of which was the understanding of the nature of light. Unlike what was proposed by the electromagnetic theory of that time, light and other electromagnetic waves are at present seen as taking the form of quantized, self-propagating oscillatory electromagnetic field disturbances called photons. Different frequencies of oscillation give rise to the different forms of electromagnetic radiation, from radio waves at the lowest frequencies, to visible light at intermediate frequencies, to gamma rays at the highest frequencies.

== See also ==
- Abraham–Lorentz force
- Aeromagnetic surveys
- Computational electromagnetics
- Double-slit experiment
- Electrodynamic droplet deformation
- Electromagnet
- Electromagnetic induction
- Electromagnetic wave equation
- Electromagnetic scattering
- Electromechanics
- Geophysics
- Introduction to electromagnetism
- Magnetostatics
- Magnetoquasistatic field
- Optics
- Relativistic electromagnetism
- Wheeler–Feynman absorber theory
