= Mazzotta =

Mazzotta is an Italian surname. Notable people with the surname include:

- Anna Mazzotta (born 1970), British artist
- Antonio Mazzotta (born 1989), Italian footballer
- Federico Mazzotta (1839–1897), Italian painter
- Giuseppe Mazzotta, American historian
- Peppino Mazzotta (born 1971), Italian actor
- Riccarda Mazzotta (born 1986), Swiss cyclist
- Roberto Mazzotta (born 1940), Italian economist and politician
