= Arturo Faldi =

Italian painter (1856–1911)

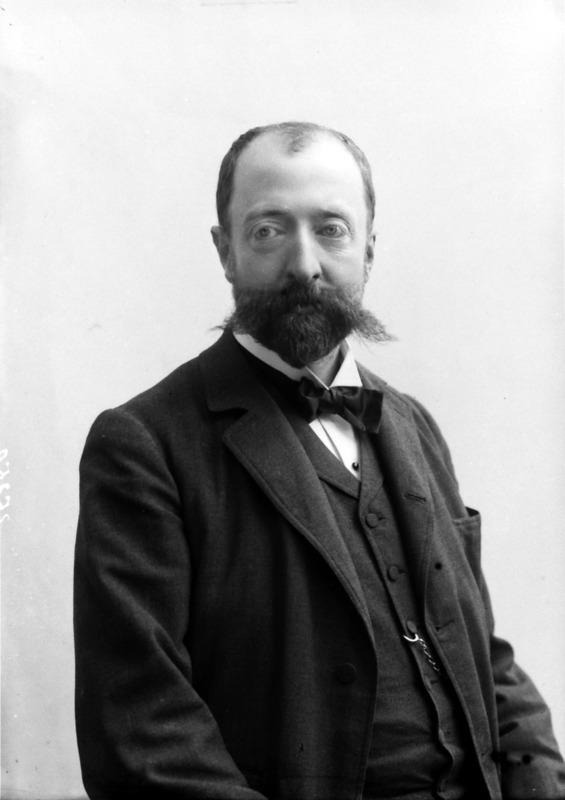
Arturo Faldi; photograph by Mario Nunes Vais

Arturo Faldi (27 July 1856, Florence, Grand Duchy of Tuscany - 30 May 1911, Florence) was an Italian painter; associated with the Macchiaioli.

== Biography ==
He studied at the Accademia di Belle Arti di Firenze, where his primary instructors were Giovanni Muzzioli and Michele Gordigiani. Until 1880, he focused on historical, Biblical, and mythological scenes; influenced by the works of Stefano Ussi.

In 1881, with "La Trecciaiuola" (The Braiding), he began to approach the more natural style practiced by the Macchiaioli. He exhibited the painting at the Salon in Paris, under the title "Paysanne d'Italie" (Italian Peasant Woman). Its success encouraged him to continue producing works on similar realistic themes and views of the Tuscan countryside. In pursuit of inspiration, he moved his studio outside Florence. His first full exhibition in this new style came the following year, in Rome. In 1888, a similar exhibition in Bologna earned him the title of "Honorary Academician" at the Accademia di Belle Arti there.

In 1892, two of his paintings were purchased on behalf of King Umberto I: "Luna di Miele" (Honeymoon), which was donated to the Turin Civic Gallery of Modern and Contemporary Art, and "Dio li Accompagni" (God Go with Them), donated to the National Gallery of Modern Art in Rome. In 1896, he was awarded a gold medal at the Große Berliner Kunstausstellung. In 1900, he obtained a bronze medal at the Exposition Universelle in Paris. He produced some illustrations for a new edition of the Divine Comedy from 1900 to 1902. By 1905, he had begun repeating his major themes, with small variations.

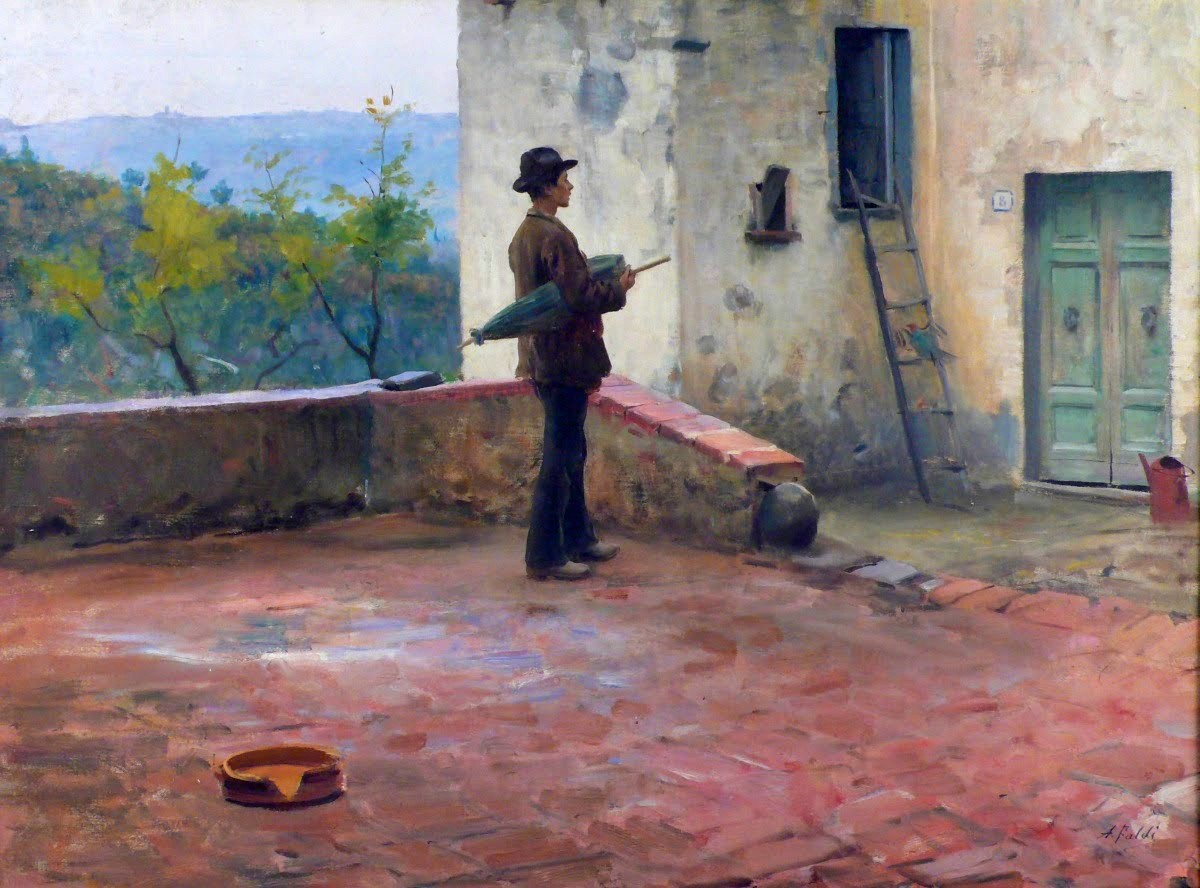
Waiting

He moved his studio to Porto Venere in 1907, to make studies for seascapes. In his later years, he taught at his alma mater, the Florence Academy, and served as its president.
