= Near field =

Near field may refer to:

- Near-field (mathematics), an algebraic structure
- Near-field region, part of an electromagnetic field
- Near field (electromagnetism)
  - Magnetoquasistatic field, the magnetic component of the electromagnetic near field
  - Near-field communication (NFC) using the magnetic component of the electromagnetic near field (magnetoquasistatic field)

== See also ==
- Near-field magnetic induction communication, a technique for deliberately limited-range communication between devices
  - Near-field communication (NFC), a set of application protocols based on this
- Near-field optics
- Near-field scanning optical microscope
