= Geminiano Mundici =

Italian painter (1823–1908)

Geminiano Mundici (December 26, 1823 – 1908) was an Italian painter, active mainly in his native Modena.

== Biography ==
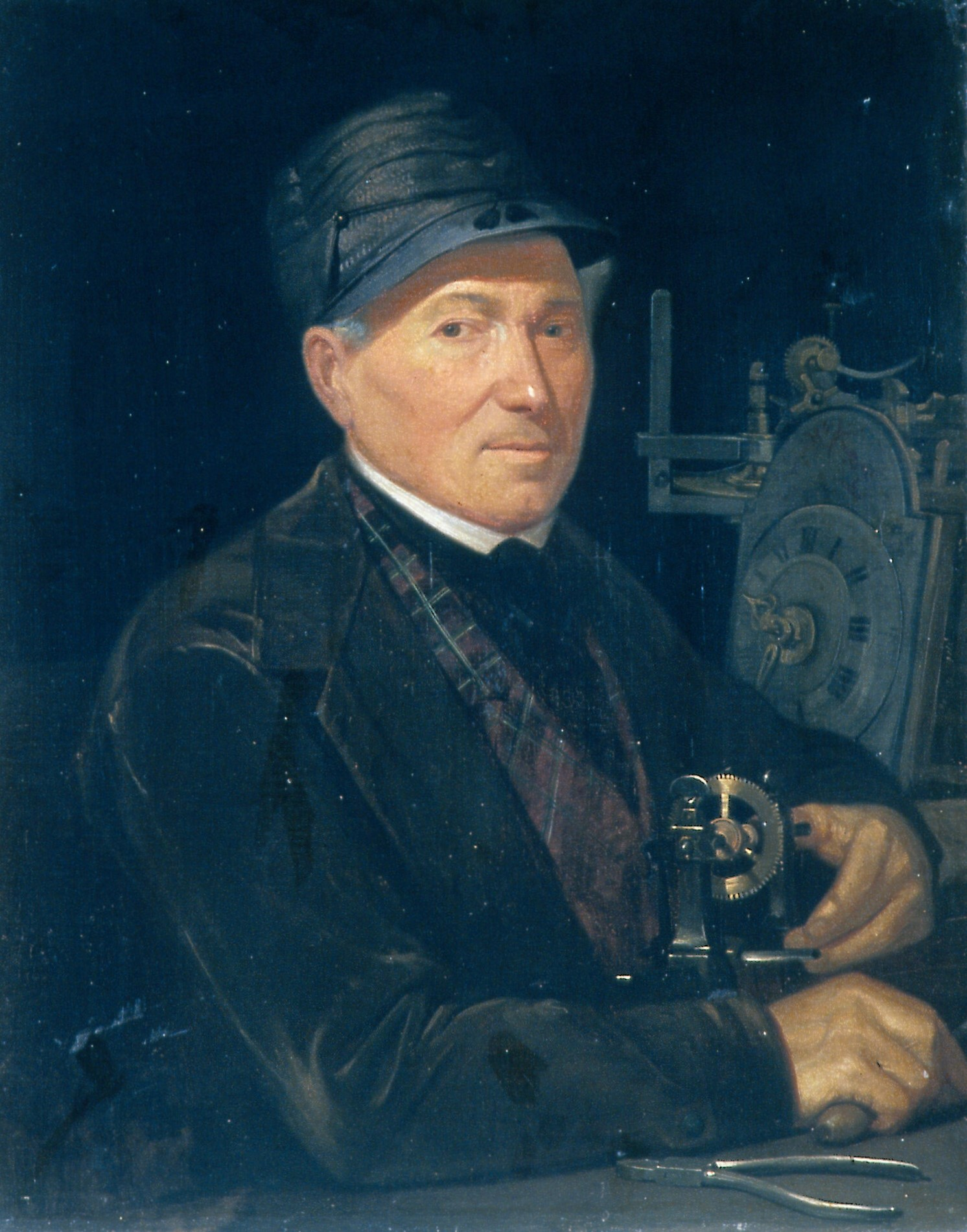
Geminiano Mundici, Portrait of Giacomo Gavioli, founder of Gavioli & Cie

Geminiano first studied under Adeodato Malatesta in the Accademia Atestina di Belle Arti in Modena. In 1844 he won the first prize award for painting with religious subject, depicting Joseph interprets the dreams of the Pharaoh's Eunuchs. His silver medallion, Tasso in his last days at Sant'Onofrio also won awards. In 1847 he defeated fellow alumni Antonio Simonazzi and Giuseppe Zattera in a competition, with his painting of Tasso meets his sister Cornelia. The painting is still in the Institute of Fine Arts.

He was granted a stipend and traveled to Venice. He joined the rebellions of 1848, and suffered exile in England until 1857. On his return to Modena, Duke Francesco V commissioned frescoes for the Ducal Palace of Modena recalling the visit of the Pope Pius VII to Modena. Once Modena came under the Savoyard dynasty, he painted frescoes depicting the Battle of Palestro and the Entry of Delegates from Reggio and Modena to Turin. He was named professor of design for the Regia Scuola Militare of Modena.

Among other works were

- Martyrdom of St Bartholemew
- Vestition of St Wilhelm of Aquitaine (1852)
- Episode during captivity in Jerusalem (1857)
- Jesus in the Orchard (1866)
- Dante explains his love for Beatrice to Florentine Women (1866)
- The Decameron (1866)
- Miracle of Capernaum (1870)
- Death of St Joseph (1870)

He died in Assisi.
