= Giovanni Muzzioli =

Italian painter (1854–1894)

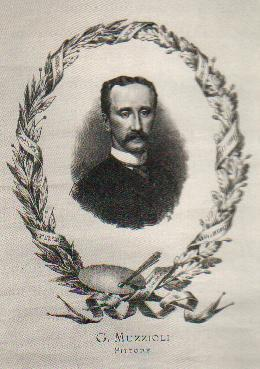
Giovanni Muzzioli's self-portrait

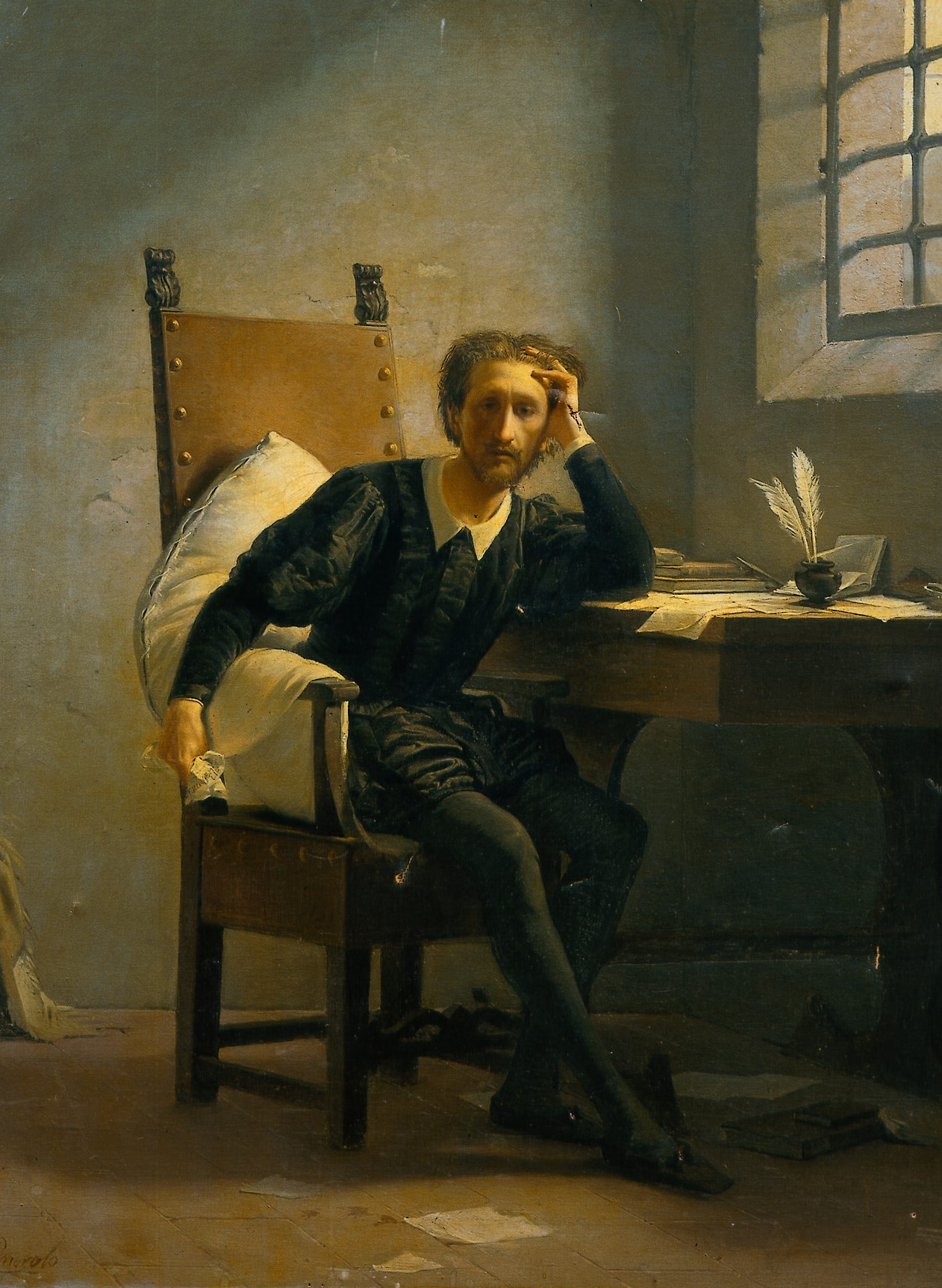
Torquato Tasso nell'ospedale di Sant'Anna, oil on canvas, 1872

Giovanni Muzzioli (10 February 1854 – 5 August 1894) was an Italian painter.

== Biography ==
Muzzioli was born in Modena, after his family had moved from Castelvetro. At the age of 15 years, he began to attend the local Academy of Fine Arts of Modena, working under Antonio Simonazzi and Asioli. At the age of seventeen (1871), years later, he gained the Poletti scholarship entitling him to four years residence in Rome studying at the Accademia di San Luca, working first under professor Podesti, and later after 1874 under professor Coghetti. In Rome, he painted an Abraham and Sarah at the court of the Pharaoh, a painting which he sent back to Modena.

Soon thereafter, he moved to Florence, where he remained for the rest of his life. After his return to Modena, Muzzioli visited the Paris Exhibition, and came under the influence of Sir Lawrence Alma-Tadema, and began painting subjects from classical history of Greece and Rome. He painted Poppea che si fa portare la Testa of Ottavia, which was exhibited in Florence, 1876. At Turin, in 1880, he displayed a canvas of The Magdalen, which he completed for the Della Valle brothers of Modena. His first important pictures were In the Temple of Bacchus and Funeral Rites in Egypt (1881, Milan Exhibition), where the former won a prize of 1,000 lire, and was praised by the critic Cesare Cantù as the most simple and equilibrated of the exhibition. The critic, Jarro, said of the same painting: "We discern (here) the man who knows how to find the word of his own, who says what he has in mind, without violence of words, or turbulence in voice. He captures the epoch, the people, the environment, with a truth, with enviable evidence, (there is here) no phantasmagoria, none of the sophisticated pomp of a scenographer."

At the Esposizione of Venice of 1887, he exhibited September Sun, while in 1888 to Bologna, he sent the Funeral of Britannicus. This latter painting was bought by signor Lionello Cavalieri of Ferrara, and is considered his masterpiece, and was much lauded at the Bologna Exhibition. Another notable work by Muzzioli was Le feste dì Flora.

From 1878 to his death in 1894, Muzzioli lived in Florence, where he painted the altarpiece for the church of Santi Senesio e Teopompo, Castelvetro di Modena. Muzzioli was named professor of the Academies of Modena, Florence, and other cities. Among the painters he influenced was Eugenio Zampighi.
