= Federico Mazzotta =

Italian painter (1839–1897)

- Born: 1839; Naples
- Died: 1897 (aged 57–58); Naples

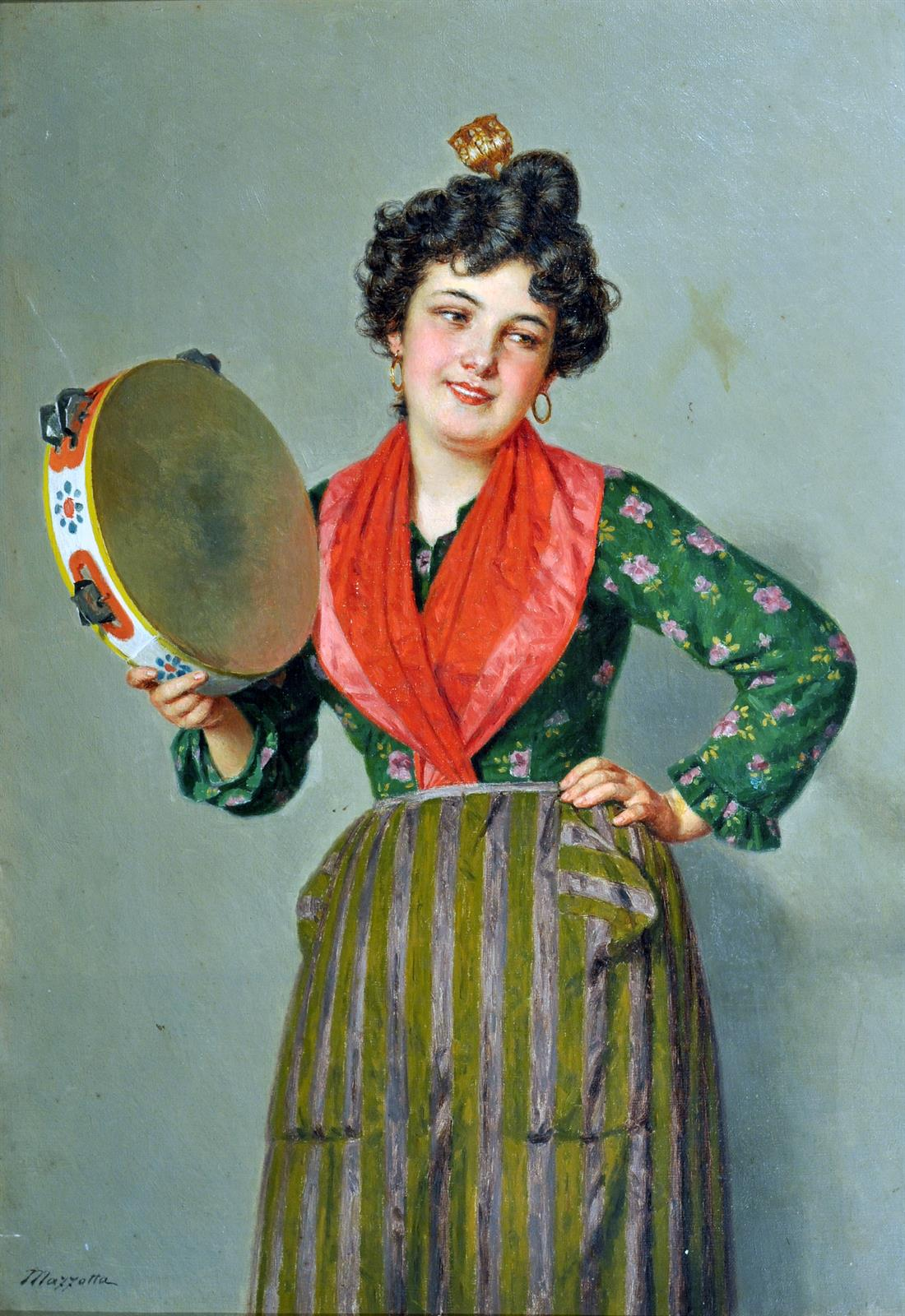
Peasant woman

Federico Mazzotta (1839–1897) was an Italian painter, mainly of genre subjects, but also historic and Neo-Pompeian themes.

He was born in Naples and was a resident of Capua. In 1884, at Turin, he exhibited: Un disastro and Un piccolo disastro. In 1886 at Milan, in 1886, he displayed Un trovatello and Il pomo morsicato, and in 1887 at Venice: In campagna.

At the 1866 Promotrice in Naples, he displayed Margherita Pusterla and her jailer. Ten years later at the exhibitions of Genova and Milano, he displayed a Dionysius, Tyrant of Syracuse. he painted a La tarantella (1873) in Naples, and Il Sandalo (Neo-Pompeian) (1876) for the Promotrice di Genova.

== External works ==
- Mazzotta's works listed at ArtNet
