= Antonio Bruno =

Italian painter

Antonio Bruno was an Italian painter of the Renaissance period. He was born in Modena or Correggio, and painted at Parma in the manner of Correggio, of whom, if not a pupil, he was a great imitator and contemporary, as one of his works is dated 1530. He painted a Madonna and Saints for the parish church in Santi Senesio e Teopompo, Castelvetro di Modena.

Antonio Bruni refers to both a poet (1593–1635) from Apulia; and also a painter (1767–1825).
