= Antonio Simonazzi =

Italian painter

Antonio Simonazzi (April 24, 1824 - 1908) was an Italian painter, active mainly in his native Modena.

== Biography ==
Antonio Simonazzi first studied under Adeodato Malatesta in the Accademia Atestina di Belle Arti in Modena. In 1841 he won the first prize award in elements of figure and ornamentation. Three years later, his painting depicting David surprises Saul in the tent also won awards. This painting is now exhibited in the Istituto d’Arte Venturi of Modena. He then traveled about Italy, studying briefly with Giuseppe Bezzuoli in Florence, and Pietro Selvatico in Venice. Returning to Modena after his travels, in 1847 he lost in a competition of alumni to Geminiano Mundici, but his painting of Santa Cecilia, was placed in the Chiesa del Voto of Modena.

Antonio took a position as instructor in the Academy of Fine Arts. For the church of the Riformati in Cesena, he painted a Sant'Antonio di Padova. He also painted a San Felice for the Cappuccini in Bologna. Among other works:

- Il Gregge
- Cacciata d'Atolo
- Il Carcere Politico
- Boccacio
- Il Riposo in Egitto
- La Lavandaie

Among his pupils were Giovanni Muzzioli, Eugenio Zampighi, Augusto Valli, and Federico Schianchi.
