= Federico Schianchi =

Italian painter (1858–1918)

Federico Schianchi (Modena, October 6, 1858 - Rome, December 28, 1918) was an Italian painter, specializing in vedute in oil and water colors of Rome and Italian countryside.

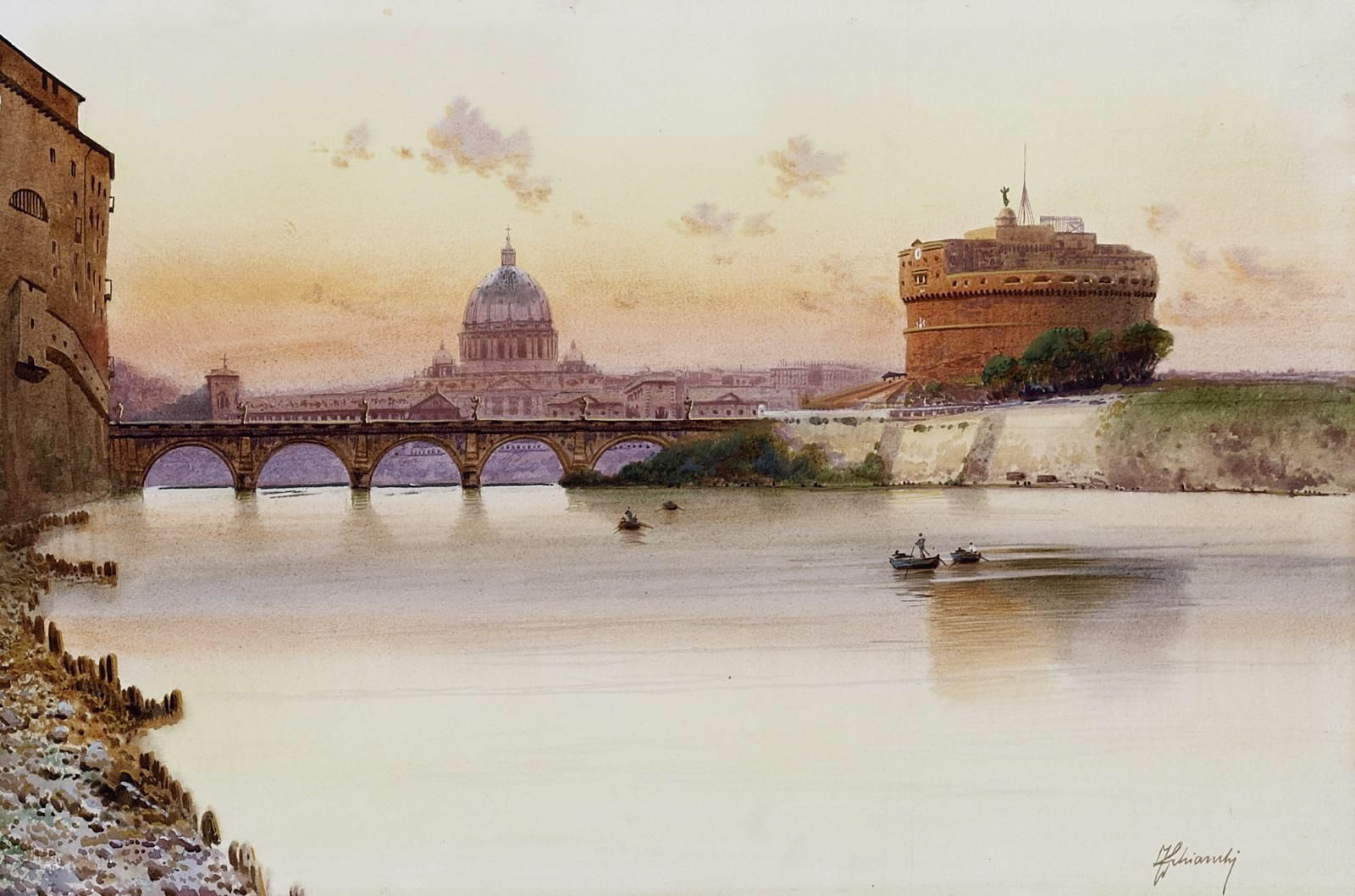
Vedute of Tiber and Castel Sant'Angelo (watercolor).

== Biography ==
He trained initially at the Modenese Institute of Fine Arts starting in 1878. There he was mentored by Antonio Simonazzi, who taught design, and the painter Ferdinando Manzini, who taught ornamentation. He moved to Rome in 1887.
