= Santi Senesio e Teopompo, Castelvetro di Modena =

Church in Castelvetro di Modena, Italy

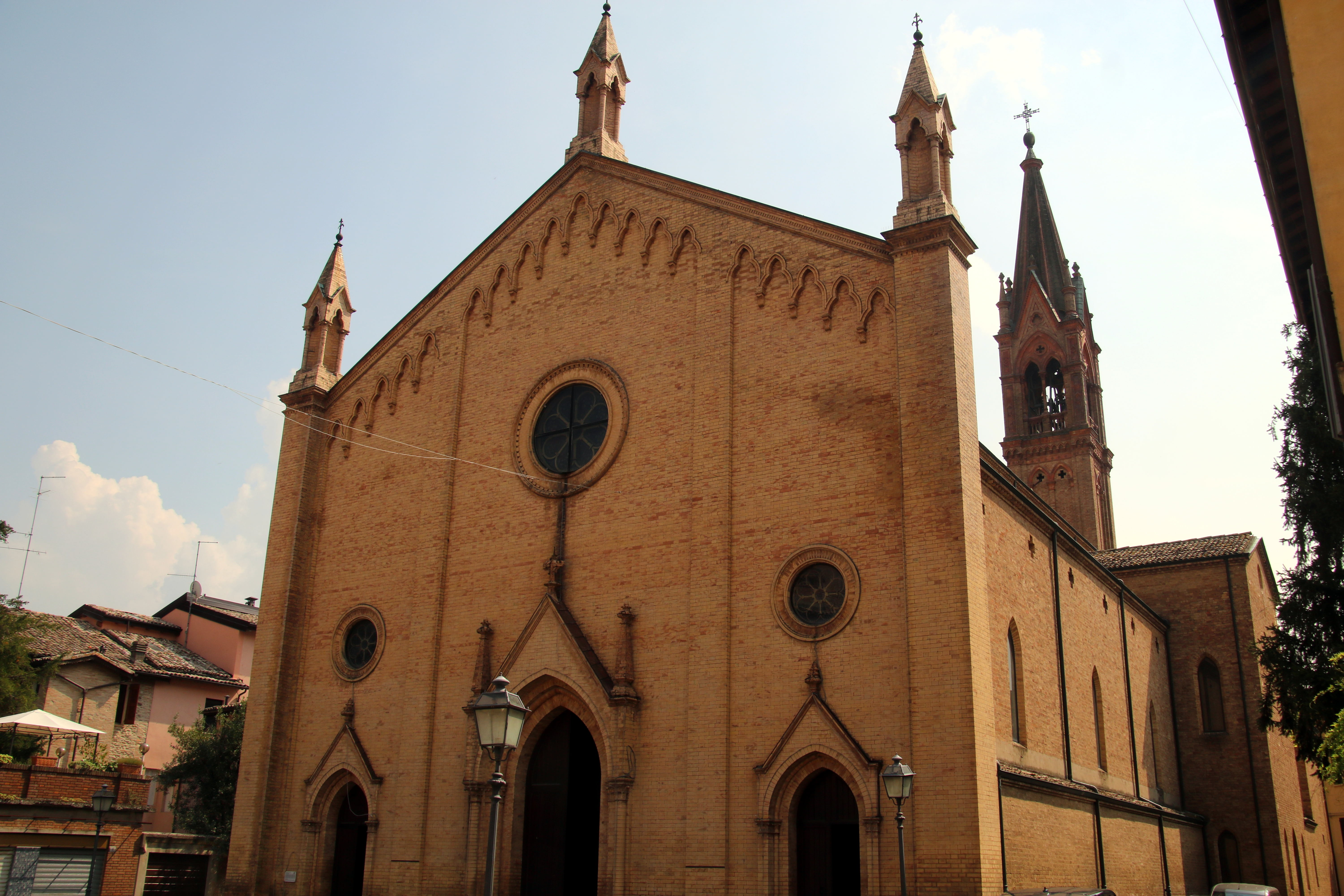
Chiesa dei Santi Senesio e Teopompo (Castelvetro di Modena) 05.jpg

Santi Senesio e Teopompo is a Roman Catholic parish church located in the town of Castelvetro di Modena in the province of Modena, region of Emilia-Romagna, Italy.

== History ==
This church was a small oratory or small church, that served as the private chapel of the Rangoni family, and was located next to the palace inside the town walls. With the influx of the population to within the protective walls. This became the town's church with the abandonment of Santa Maria del Gherlo, an ancient church (documented 996) which had been located outside the walls.

Santi Senesio e Teopompo was rebuilt after an earthquake in 1501. In 1613, a belltower was added. Further restructuring occurred in 1758, and in 1907, the church was restructured in Gothic style by Carlo Barbieri.

The first chapel on the left had fresco fragments of a 16th-century Madonna and Child; the other, the Martyrdom of St Peter, in the style of Dosso Dossi. Other canvases include a main altarpiece San Teopompo baptizes the Magus Teona by Giovanni Muzzioli. The church has a Madonna and Saints by Antonio Bruno.
