= Eugenio Zampighi =

Italian painter and photographer

Eugenio Zampighi (1859–1944) was an Italian painter and photographer, mainly of genre subjects.

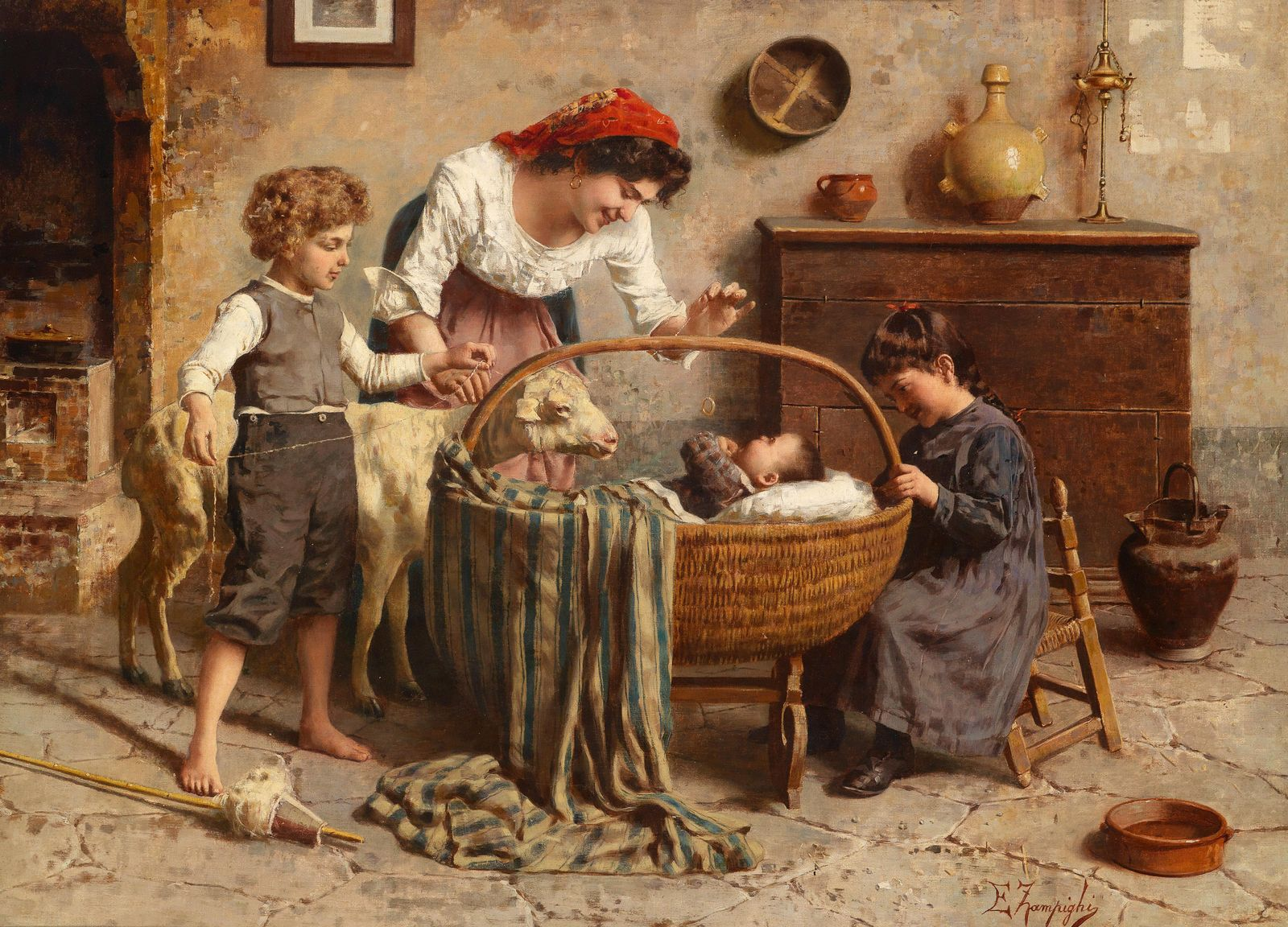
Idyllic Family Scene with Newborn

== Biography ==
He was born in Modena and enrolled at the Academy of Fine Arts in Modena under Antonio Simonazzi. At a very young age and from his early history paintings on he was influenced by the verist Modenese painter Giovanni Muzzioli. After winning the Poletti Prize for painting in 1880, with his entry, A Retiarius (net-man) gladiator wounded in a Flavian Amphitheater, he had the opportunity of continuing his studies first in Rome and later in Florence where he settled permanently in 1884. During the 1880s, he began to produce a repertoire of genre scenes, which had an extraordinary success on the art market and brought him international commissions. He was influenced by the style of Gaetano Chierici, and by the Florentine Macchiaioli School.

His intense work as a photographer was for the most part geared to his painting and took place mainly in his studio with the aid of models in peasant costume or the dress of the common people. After taking these photographs the artist used them to create a joyous and idyllic image of Italian rural life, devoid of any hint of social criticism, which was so greatly appreciated by foreign tourists that this led him to produce a series of the same retardataire stereotypes right into the early decades of the 20th century.

Zampighi died in Maranello, Modena, in 1944.

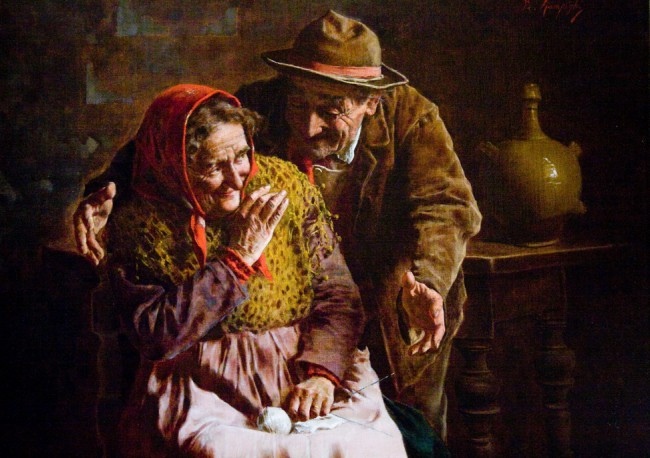

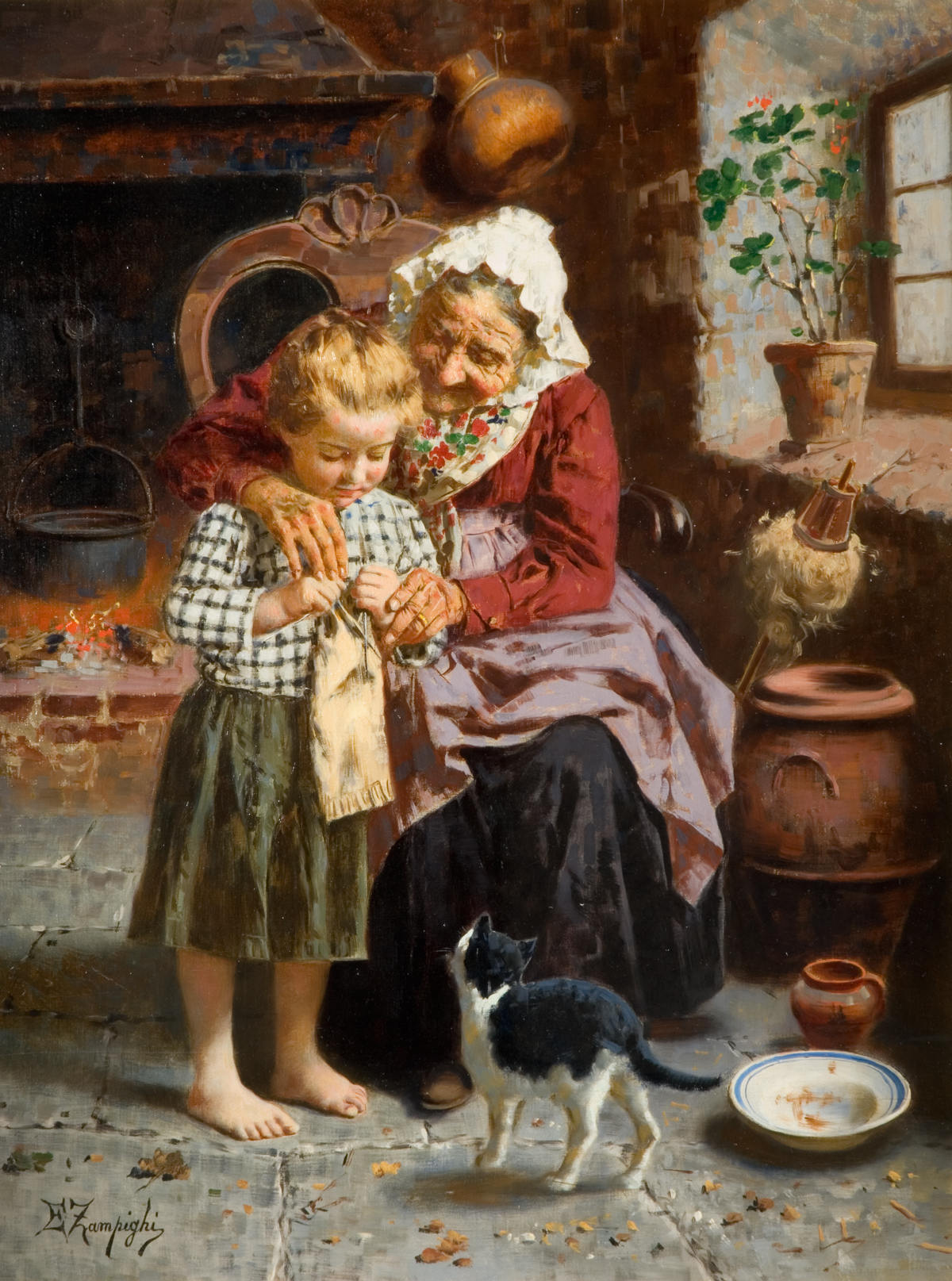
Her First Lesson

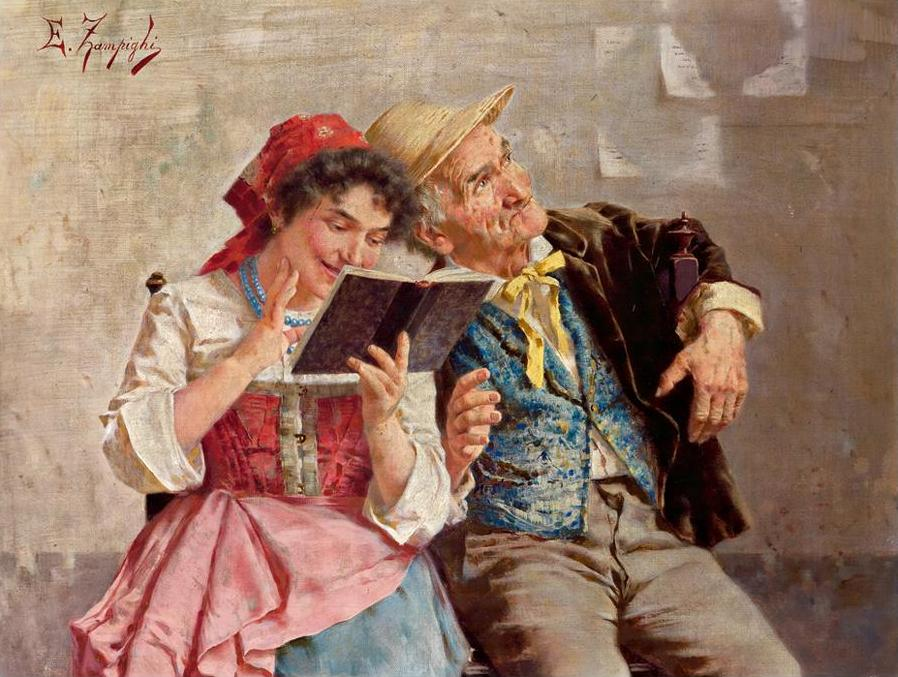

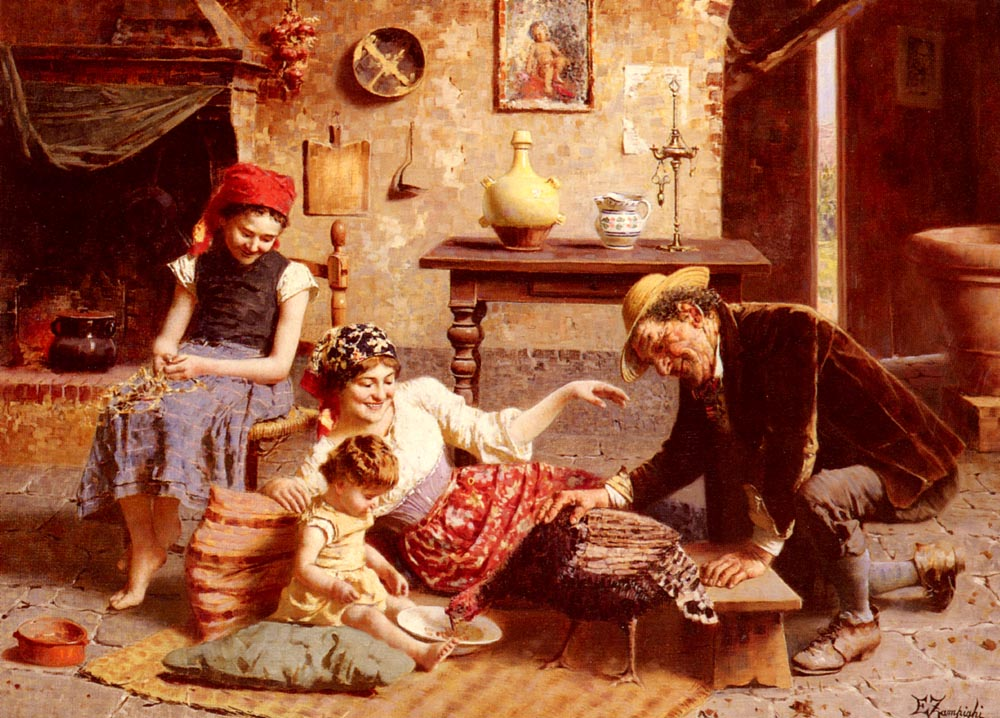
A Happy Family

== Bibliography ==
- Elena Lissoni, Eugenio Zampighi, online catalogue Artgate by Fondazione Cariplo, 2010, CC BY-SA (source for the first revision of this article).
