= Margherita Pusterla =

1838 Italian novel by Cesare Cantù

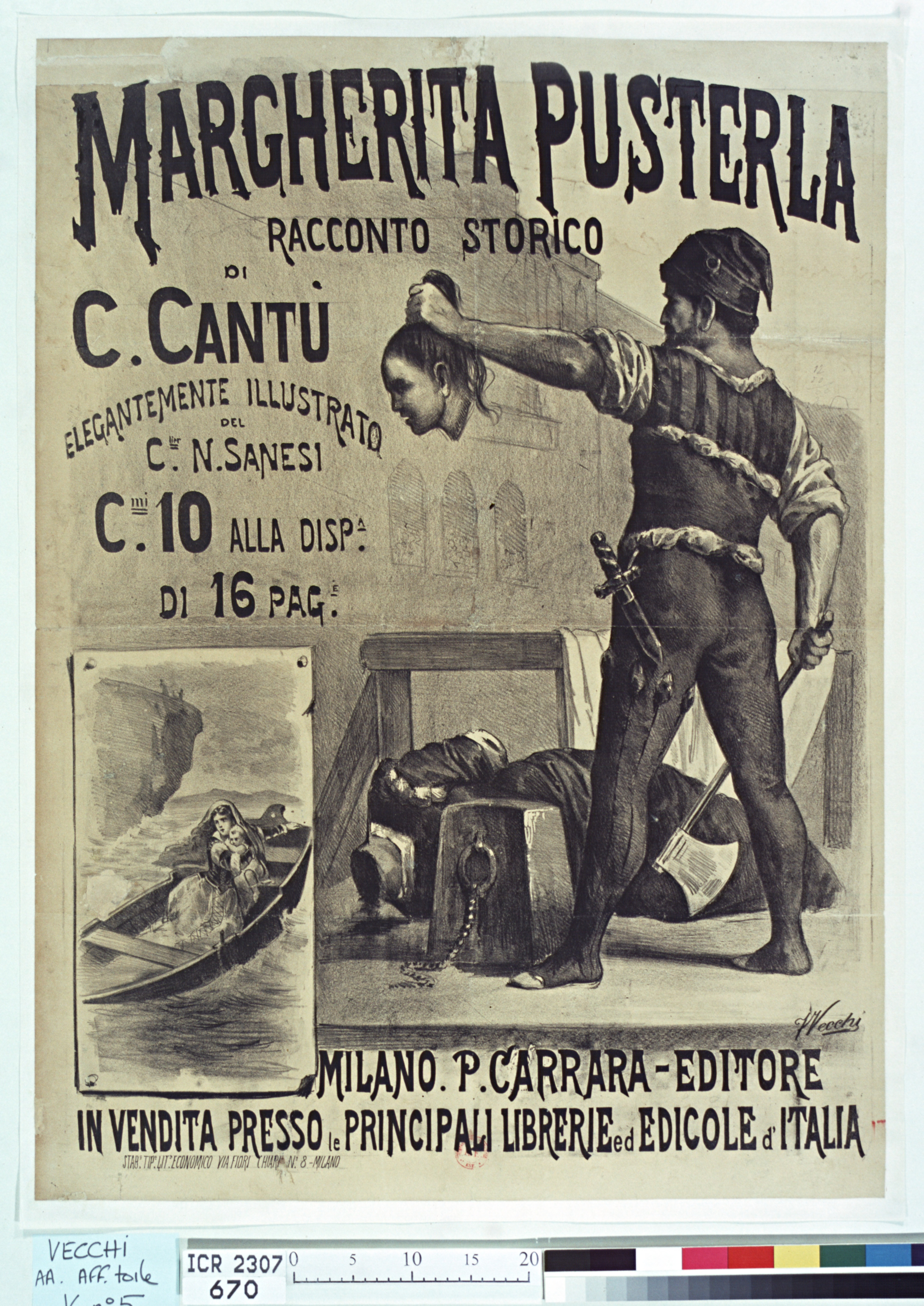
- Frontispiece of 1890 edition
- Author: Cesare Cantù
- Language: Italian
- Genre: Historical novel
- Set in: Lombardy, 1340-41
- Publication date: 1838
- Publication place: Lombardy–Venetia

Margherita Pusterla is an Italian historical novel by Cesare Cantù, first published in 1838. It is set in the Duchy of Milan in the fourteenth century. For many years it was the most popular novel in Italy after Alessandro Manzoni's masterpiece, The Betrothed.

== Writing and publication ==
Margherita Pusterla was written between 1833 and 1834 while the author, Cesare Cantù, was in prison on charges of conspiracy against the Austrian government. Composed under great difficulties, suppressed by the Austrian authorities who felt themselves attacked through this work, the novel was not published until 1838. The work was a great success and was translated in different languages.

== Plot summary ==
The novel is set in the mid-14th century – a period which had already been treated in Tommaso Grossi's Marco Visconti (1834), to which novel Cantù alludes in his own work. It is based on actual events that happened in Milan between the years 1340 and 1341. The scene is laid in Milan during the reign of Luchino Visconti. Luchino attempts to seduce Margherita, the wife of the rich and noble Francescolo Pusterla. Rebuffed by her, the tyrant seeks revenge by sending to the scaffold husband, wife and their young son, a mere child, after having had the parents condemned for treason against the state and conspiracy against his life. Vain are the attempts to save his master and mistress by the devoted young squire, Alpinolo, and the efforts to deter the vindictive Luchino from his cruel purpose on the part of the good monk Fra Buonvicino (modelled on the character of Fra Cristoforo from The Betrothed).

The book owes its success to the splendid pictures of medieval life and to the pathos and horror of its situations. The execution of Margherita Pusterla, a powerful but revolting scene, has been much admired. For a historian of no mean ability, Cantù, as has been justly pointed out by Mazzoni, makes curious blunders and takes singular liberties with his sources. Written when Romanticism was supreme in Italy, Margherita Pusterla recalls in many of its particulars Alessandro Manzoni's The Betrothed, while attempting to rival the vast panoramas, the highly colored realism and the violent contrasts of Victor Hugo's Notre-Dame de Paris.

== Bibliography ==
- Chandler, Bernard (1999). "Cantù, Cesare". In Peter Bondanella; Julia Conway Bondanella (eds.). Cassell Dictionary Italian Literature. A&C Black. pp. 99–101.
- Milanini, Claudio (2014). "La contraddizione nei romanzi di Cesare Cantù". Da Porta a Calvino. Saggi e ritratti critici. LED Edizioni Universitarie. pp. 71–88. ISBN 978-8879166874.
