= Cesare Cantù =

Italian historian

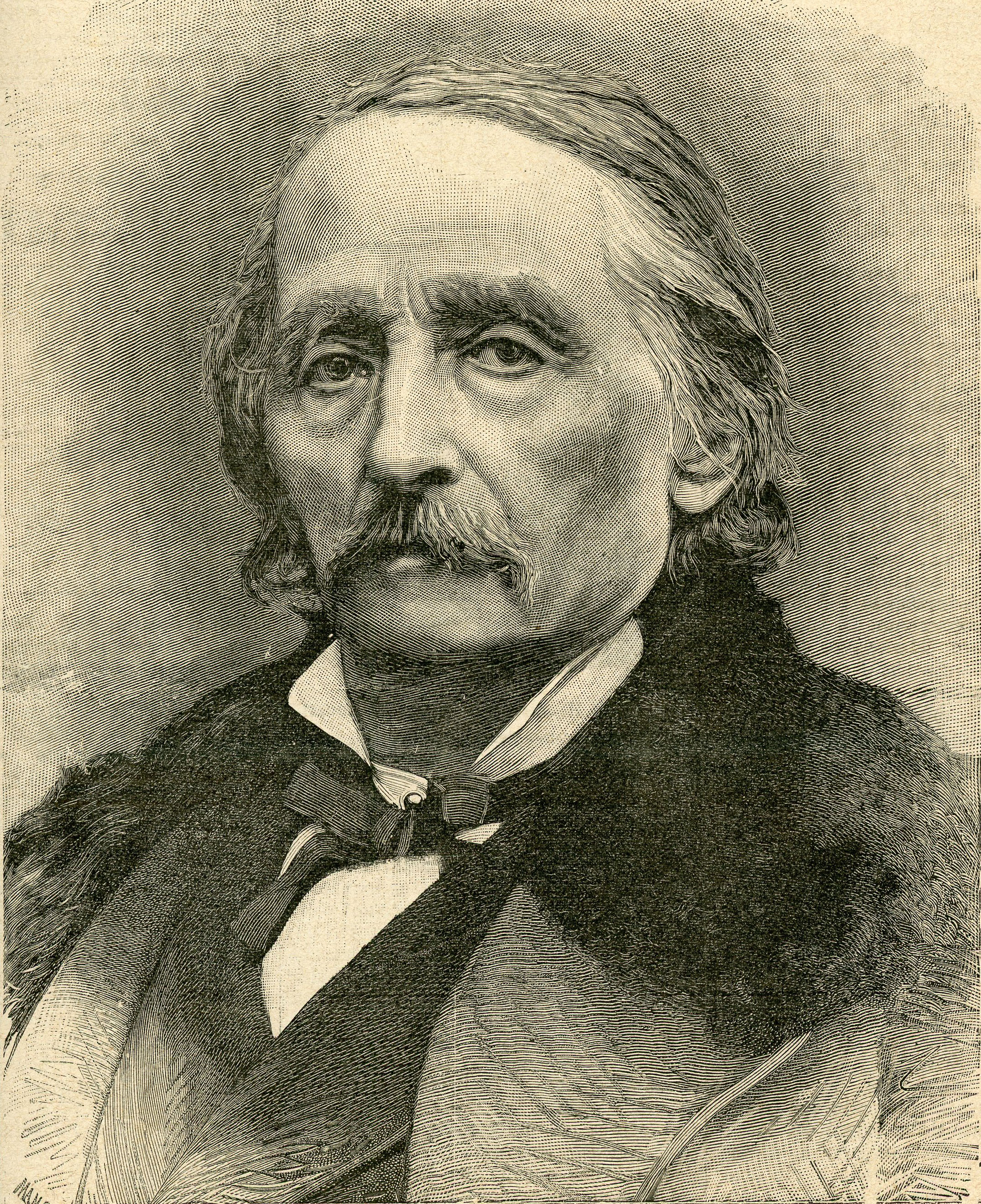
- Cesare Cantù
- Born: 5 December 1804; Brivio, Italian Republic
- Died: 11 March 1895 (aged 90); Milan, Kingdom of Italy
- Occupations: Historian, archivist, writer, novelist
- Movement: Romanticism
- Parent(s): Celso Cantù and Rachele Cantù (née Gallavresi)

Academic background
- Education: Barnabite College of St. Alexander, Milan

Academic work
- Institutions: State Archives of Milan
- Notable works: Margherita Pusterla (1838)

Signature
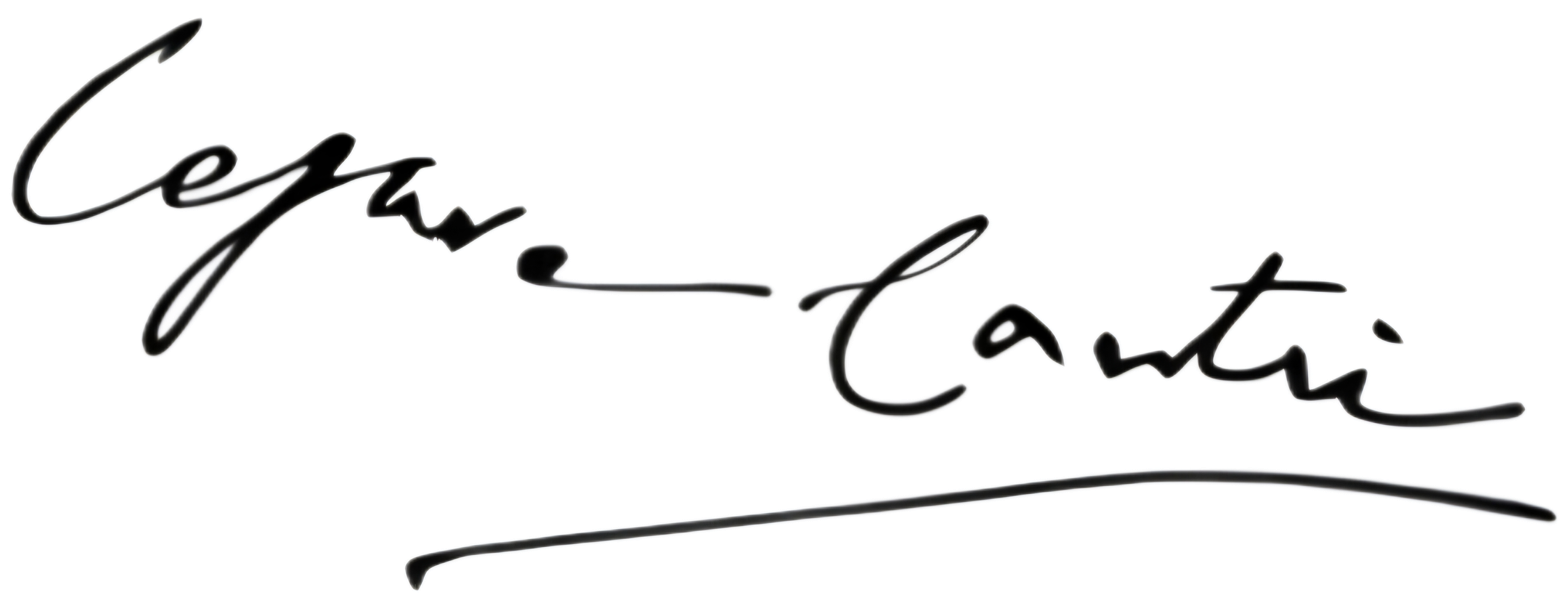

Cesare Cantù (Italian pronunciation: [ˈtʃeːzare kanˈtu, ˈtʃɛː-]; December 5, 1804 – March 11, 1895) was an Italian historian, writer, archivist and politician. An immensely prolific writer, Cantù was one of Italy's best-known and most important Romantic scholars.

== Biography ==
Cantù was born December 5, 1804, at Brivio, near Como in Lombardy. The eldest of ten children, he belonged to an old though impoverished family. He studied in Milan, at the Barnabite College of St. Alexander, and began his career as a teacher. In 1822 he began teaching literature at the liceo in his native Brivio. He went on to teach in Como, and in 1832 in Milan. His first literary essay (1828) was a romantic poem entitled Algiso, and in the following year, he produced a Storia della città e della diocesi di Como in two volumes (Como, 1829). Shortly afterwards appeared Ragionamenti sulla Storia Lombarda nel secolo XVII (Milan, 1832), which was published later under the title Commento storico ai Promessi Sposi di A. Manzoni, o la Lombardia nel secolo XVII. The death of his father then left him in charge of a large family, and he worked very hard both as a teacher and a writer to provide for them. His prodigious literary activity led to his falling under the suspicions of the Austrian police, who thought he was a member of Young Italy, and he was arrested in 1833.

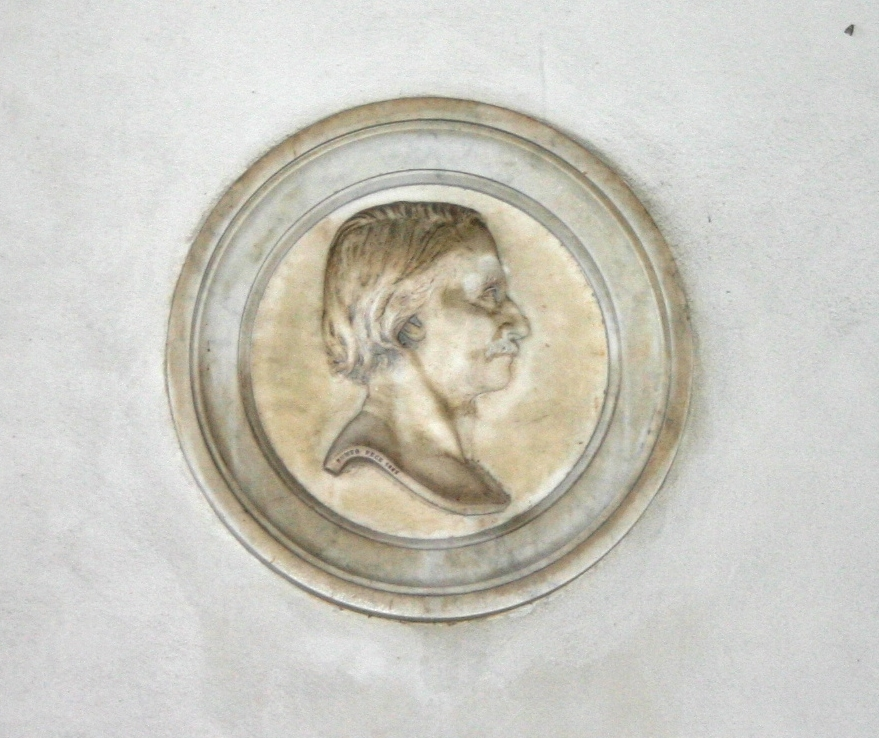
Cesare Cantù.

While in prison, writing materials were denied him, but he managed to write on rags with a tooth-pick and candle smoke, and thus composed the historical novel Margherita Pusterla (Milan, 1838). On his release a year later, as he was prohibited from teaching, literature became his only recourse. In 1836 the Turinese publisher, Giuseppe Pomba, commissioned him to write a universal history, which his vast reading enabled him to do. In six years the work was completed in seventy-two volumes, and immediately achieved a general popularity; the publisher made a fortune out of it, and Cantù's royalties amounted, it is said, to 300,000 lire (£12,000). The work was often reprinted, and has been translated into English, German, French, and Spanish.

It is the first historical work by an Italian which, in a well-finished and vigorous style, gives a philosophical treatment of the development of all civilized peoples from the remotest times to the pontificate of Pius IX. In 1846 Cantù published a successful collection of poems for children entitled Fior di memoria pei bambini. He collaborated with the most important Italian academic journals, including the Annali universali di statistica, directed by Gian Domenico Romagnosi, the Antologia, directed by Giovan Pietro Vieusseux, and the Ricoglitore italiano e straniero, which mainly dealt with historical and literary subjects.

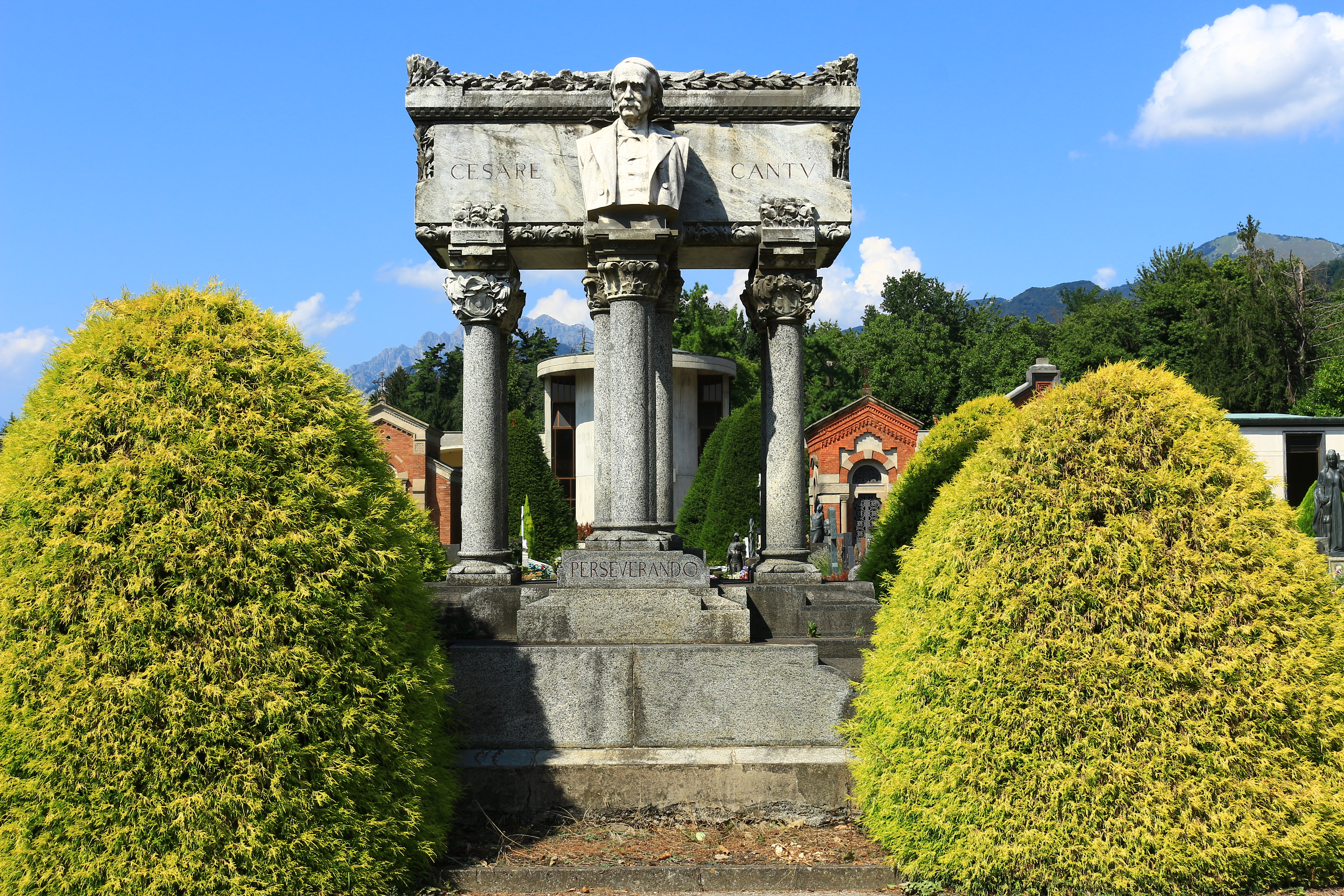
Grave of Cesare Cantù in the cemetery of his hometown, Brivio

Just before the revolution of 1848, being warned that he would be arrested, he fled to Turin, but after the Five Days he returned to Milan and edited a paper called La Guardia Nazionale. Between 1849 and 1850 he published his Storia degli Italiani (Turin, 1855) and many other works. In 1857 the archduke Maximilian tried to conciliate the Milanese by the promise of a constitution, and Cantù was one of the few Liberals who accepted the olive branch, and went about in company with the archduke. This act was regarded as treason and caused Cantù much annoyance in later years. He continued his literary activity after the formation of the Italian kingdom, producing volume after volume until his death. He was a member of Parliament from 1859 to 1861. A staunch Catholic, Cantù opposed the bill establishing civil marriage and was one of the few MPs to vote against the separation of church and state. In 1873 he founded the Lombard historical society, and was appointed superintendent of the State Archives of Milan. On 27 February 1867 Cantù was elected corresponding member of the Institut de France and in 1875 he became a member of the Accademia Nazionale dei Lincei.

Cantù died in Milan on March 11, 1895, and was buried in his hometown of Brivio. Cantù showed the influence of the Romantic school, of which Alessandro Manzoni is the most important representative, and he sought to combine Church and State, politics and religion. The effect of the Romantic movement is particularly evident in those works in which Cantù treated the history of Italy of his own time, as in: Storia dei cent'anni, 1750-1850 (5 vols., Florence, 1851); Storia degli Italiani (3 vols., Turin, 1879). His brother Ignazio (1810-1877) was, like him, a teacher and prolific writer, principally of historical and educational works of a strongly moralizing nature. His best-known fiction is the historical novel Il marchese Annibale Perrone (1842), which, like its Manzonian model, is set in the 17th century.

== Works ==
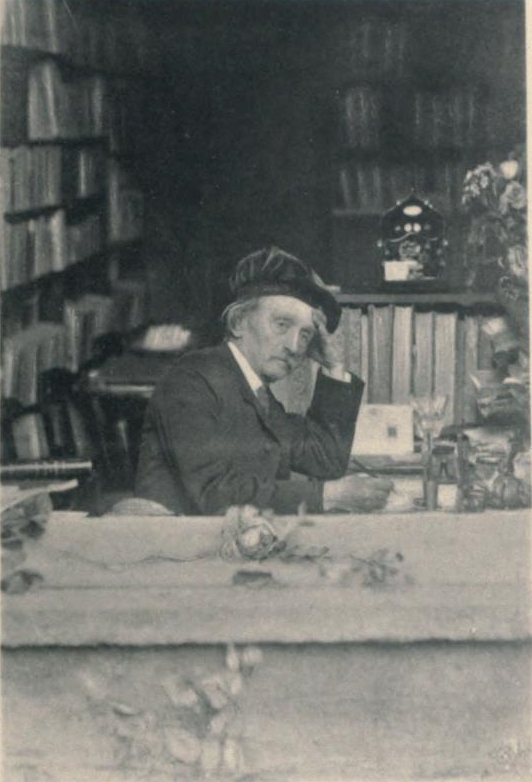
Cesare Cantù in his private study

- Algiso (1828).
- Epigramma (1829).
- I Morti di Torino (1831).
- Sul Romanzo Storico (1831).
- Di Victor Hugo e del Romanticismo in Francia (1833).
- Isotta (1833).
- Storia della Dominazione degli Arabi e dei Mori in Ispagna e Portogallo (1833).
- Lord Byron (1833).
- I Crociati a Venezia (1833).
- L'Incontro del Tigre (1834).
- La Madonna d'Imbevera (1835).
- Chateaubriand (1835).
- Rimembranze di un Viaggio in Oriente (1835).
- Le Glorie delle Belle Arti (1835).
- Stefano Gallini (1836).
- Un Viaggio Piovoso (1836).
- I Giovinetti (1836).
- Soria della Caduta dell'impero Romano e della Decadenza della Civiltà (1836).
- Inni (1836).
- Lombardia Pittoresca (1836–38).
- Una Buona Famiglia (1837).
- Il Galantuomo (1837).
- Il Buon Fanciullo (1837).
- Il Giovinetto Drizzato alla Bontà, al Sapere, all'industria (1837).
- Margherita Pusterla (1838).
- Processo Originale degli Untori nella Peste del 1630 (1839).
- Il Letterato (1839).
- Storia Universale (1840–47).
- Di un Nuovo Testo del Giorno di Giuseppe Parini (1841).
- Della Letteratura Italiana (1841).
- Beniamino Franklin (1841).
- La Setajuola (1841).
- Sei Novelle (1841).
- Cronache Milanesi (1842).
- Parini e il suo Secolo (1842).
- Milano e il suo Territorio (1844).
- Novelle Lombarde (1846).
- Fior di Memoria pei Bambini (1846).
- Influenza che Beccaria e Verri Esercitano sulla Condizione Economica Morale del Loro Paese (1846).
- Trattato dei Monumenti di Archeologia e Belle Arti (1846).
- Racconti (1847).
- I Carnevali Milanesi (1847).
- Semplice Informazione (1848).
- Discorso (1848).
- Storia degli Ultimi Tempi (1848).
- La Sollevazione di Milano (1848).
- Storia di Cento Anni, 1750–1850 (1851).
- Ezzelino da Romano (1852).
- Il Bambino (1853).
- La Croce (1854).
- L'Abate Parini e la Lombardia nel Secolo Passato: Studi (1854).
- Storia degli Italiani (1854–56).
- Scorsa di un Lombardo negli Archivi di Venezia (1856).
- Storia di Milano (1857–61).
- Grande Illustrazione del Lombardo-Veneto (1857–61).
- Ai Suoi Elettori (1860).
- Notizie sopra Milano (1860).
- Vincenzo Monti (1861).
- La Contessa Ortensia Carletti nata Liberatore (1862).
- Tommaso Grossi (1862).
- Beccaria e il Diritto Penale (1862).
- Storia della Letteratura Greca (1863).
- Del Diritto nella Storia (1863).
- Il Tempo dei Frencesi, 1796–1815 (1864).
- Opere Minori (1864).
- Storia della Letteratura Latina (1864).
- La Religione e la Critica (1864).
- Sul Giuramento Politico e la Siberia della Scienza (1865).
- Le Elezioni in Italia (1865).
- Sull'origine della Lingua Italiana (1865).
- Storia della Letteratura Italiana (1865).
- Il Principe Eugenio (1865).
- Gli Eretici d'Italia (1865–66).
- Due Politiche (1866).
- Vite Parallele di Mirabeau e Washington (1867).
- Alcuni Italiani Contemporanei Delineati (1868).
- Paesaggi e Macchiette (1868).
- I Doveri di Scuola (1868).
- Il Caffè (1868).
- Il Thè (1868).
- Carta e Libri (1868).
- Del Progresso Positivo (1869).
- Poesie (1870).
- L'Arte e il Pudore (1870).
- Buon Senso e Buon Cuore (1870).
- Antologia Militare (1870).
- Portafoglio d'un Operaio (1871).
- La Quistione Sociale (1871).
- Sulla Questione Operaia (1871).
- Il Patriota Popolano (1872).
- Della Indipendenza Italiana (1872–77).
- Cantate Sacre sulla Passione di Cristo (1873).
- Gli Archivi e la Storia (1873).
- Esempi di Bontà (1873).
- Italiani Illustri (1873–74).
- Narrazioni Scelte di Tito Livio (1875).
- I Lombardi, il Barbarossa e la Battaglia di Legnano (1876).
- Attenzione! (1876).
- Il Convento di Pontida (1876).
- Il Papa e gli Errori del Secolo (1876).
- Gli Ultimi trent'anni (1879).
- Manuale di Storia Italiana (1879).
- Dialogo dei Morti ed Altri Opuscoli di Luciano (1882).
- Nuove Esigenze di una Storia Universale (1882).
- Onoranze ai Vivi (1883).
- Novelle Brianzuole (1883).
- Il Fedone di Platone (1883).
- Niccolò Machiavelli (1885).
- Lavoro e Socialisno (1885).
- Antichi e Moderni (1888).
- Della Letteratura delle Nazioni (1889–91).
- Biografia del Padre Girard (1891).
- Lettere di Uomini Illustri per Demetrio Gramantieri (1894).
