= Magnetoquasistatic field =

Type of electromagnetic field where a slow oscillating magnetic field is dominate

A magnetoquasistatic field is a class of electromagnetic field in which a slowly oscillating magnetic field is dominant. A magnetoquasistatic field is typically generated by low-frequency induction from a magnetic dipole or a current loop. The magnetic near-field of such an emitter behaves differently from the more commonly used far-field electromagnetic radiation. At low frequencies the rate of change of the instantaneous field strength with each cycle is relatively slow, giving rise to the name "magneto-quasistatic". The near field or quasistatic region typically extends no more than a wavelength from the antenna, and within this region the electric and magnetic fields are approximately decoupled.

Weakly conducting non-magnetic bodies, including the human body and many mineral rocks, are effectively transparent to magnetoquasistatic fields, allowing for the transmission and reception of signals through such obstacles. Also, long-wavelength (i.e. low-frequency) signals are better able to propagate round corners than shorter-wave signals. Communication therefore need not be line-of-sight.

The communication range of such signals depends on both the wavelength and the electromagnetic properties of the intervening medium at the chosen frequency, and is typically limited to a few tens of meters.

== Physical principles ==
The laws of primary interest are Ampère's circuital law (with the displacement current density neglected) and the magnetic flux continuity law. These laws have associated with them continuity conditions at interfaces. In the absence of magnetizable materials, these laws determine the magnetic field intensity H given its source, the current density J. H is not everywhere irrotational. However, it is solenoidal everywhere.

== Equipment design ==
A typical antenna comprises a 50-turn coil around a polyoxymethylene tube with diameter 16.5 cm, driven by a class E oscillator circuit. Such a device is readily portable when powered by batteries. Similarly, a typical receiver consist of an active receiving loop with diameter of one meter, an ultra-low-noise amplifier, and a band-pass filter.

In operation the oscillator drives current through the transmitting loop to create an oscillating magnetic field. This field induces a voltage in the receiving loop, which is then amplified.

Because the quasistatic region is defined within one wavelength of the electromagnetic source, emitters are limited to a frequency range between about 1 kHz and 1 MHz. Reducing the oscillating frequency increases the wavelength and hence the range of the quasistatic region, but reduces the induced voltage in the receiving loops which worsens the signal-to-noise ratio. In experiments carried out by the Carnegie Institute of Technology, the maximum range reported by was 50 meters.

== Applications ==
=== Resonant inductive coupling ===
In resonant coupling, the source and receiver are tuned to resonate at the same frequency and are given similar impedances. This allows power as well as information to flow from the source to the receiver. Such coupling via the magnetoquasistatic field is called resonant inductive coupling and can be used for wireless energy transfer.

Applications include induction cooking, induction charging of batteries and some kinds of RFID tag.

=== Communications ===
Conventional electromagnetic communication signals cannot pass through the ground. Most mineral rock is neither electrically conducting nor magnetic, allowing magnetic fields to penetrate. Magnetoquasistatic systems have been successfully used for underground wireless communication, both surface-to-underground and between underground parties.

At extremely low frequencies, below about 1 kHz, the wavelength is long enough for long-distance communication, although at a slow data rate. Such systems have been installed in submarines, with the local antenna comprising a wire up to several kilometers in length and trailed behind the vessel when at or near the surface.

=== Position and orientation tracking ===
Wireless position tracking is being increasingly used in applications such as navigation, security, and asset tracking. Conventional position tracking devices use high frequencies or microwaves, including global positioning systems (GPS), ultra-wide band (UWB) systems, and radio frequency identification systems (RFID), but these systems can easily be blocked by obstacles in their path. Magnetoquasistatic positioning takes advantage of the fact that the fields are largely undisturbed when in the presence of human beings and physical structures, and can be used for both position and orientation tracking for ranges up to 50 meters.

To accurately determine the orientation and position of a dipole/emitter, allowance must be made not only for the field pattern generated by the emitter, but also for the eddy-currents they induce in the earth, which create secondary fields detectable by the receivers. By using complex image theory to correct this field generation from earth, and by using frequencies on the order of a few hundred kilohertz to obtain the required signal-to-noise ratio (SNR), it is possible to analyze the position of the dipole through azimuthal orientation, $\theta$, and inclination orientation, $\phi$.

A Disney research team has used this technology to effectively determine the position and orientation of an American football, something not traceable through conventional wave propagation techniques due to human body obstruction. They inserted an oscillator-driven coil, around the diameter of the center of the ball, to generate the magnetoquasistatic field. The signal was able to pass undisturbed through multiple players.
