= List of municipalities of the Metropolitan City of Bologna =

The following is a list of the 55 municipalities (comuni) of the Metropolitan City of Bologna in the region of Emilia-Romagna in Italy.

== List ==
Municipality	Population (2026)	Area (km²)	Density
Alto Reno Terme	7,179	73.62	97.5
Anzola dell'Emilia	12,414	36.60	339.2
Argelato	9,573	35.10	272.7
Baricella	7,207	45.48	158.5
Bentivoglio	5,855	51.11	114.6
Bologna	391,473	140.86	2,779.2
Borgo Tossignano	3,231	29.27	110.4
Budrio	18,494	120.19	153.9
Calderara di Reno	13,767	40.75	337.8
Camugnano	1,911	96.60	19.8
Casalecchio di Reno	35,359	17.33	2,040.3
Casalfiumanese	3,361	82.03	41.0
Castel d'Aiano	1,969	45.26	43.5
Castel del Rio	1,224	52.58	23.3
Castel di Casio	3,348	47.33	70.7
Castel Guelfo di Bologna	4,473	28.61	156.3
Castel Maggiore	18,479	30.90	598.0
Castel San Pietro Terme	20,702	148.42	139.5
Castello d'Argile	6,694	29.07	230.3
Castenaso	16,670	35.73	466.6
Castiglione dei Pepoli	5,499	65.76	83.6
Crevalcore	14,210	102.75	138.3
Dozza	6,513	24.23	268.8
Fontanelice	1,910	36.56	52.2
Gaggio Montano	4,931	58.67	84.0
Galliera	5,776	37.15	155.5
Granarolo dell'Emilia	13,117	34.37	381.6
Grizzana Morandi	3,947	77.40	51.0
Imola	69,702	205.02	340.0
Lizzano in Belvedere	2,295	85.45	26.9
Loiano	4,589	52.41	87.6
Malalbergo	9,403	53.82	174.7
Marzabotto	6,926	74.53	92.9
Medicina	16,817	159.11	105.7
Minerbio	8,959	43.07	208.0
Molinella	15,910	127.84	124.5
Monghidoro	3,934	48.29	81.5
Monte San Pietro	10,845	74.69	145.2
Monterenzio	6,169	105.26	58.6
Monzuno	6,433	65.01	99.0
Mordano	4,588	21.45	213.9
Ozzano dell'Emilia	14,416	64.95	222.0
Pianoro	17,852	107.13	166.6
Pieve di Cento	7,431	15.94	466.2
Sala Bolognese	8,451	45.64	185.2
San Benedetto Val di Sambro	4,268	66.47	64.2
San Giorgio di Piano	9,771	30.43	321.1
San Giovanni in Persiceto	28,195	114.41	246.4
San Lazzaro di Savena	32,950	44.72	736.8
San Pietro in Casale	13,206	65.86	200.5
Sant'Agata Bolognese	7,345	34.79	211.1
Sasso Marconi	14,829	96.45	153.7
Valsamoggia	32,258	178.14	181.1
Vergato	7,946	59.94	132.6
Zola Predosa	19,516	37.75	517.0

== See also ==
- List of municipalities of Emilia-Romagna
- List of municipalities of Italy
