= Province of Bologna =

Former province of Italy

Coordinates: 44°29′38″N 11°20′34″E

Provincia di Bologna
- Province of Kingdom of Italy and Republic of Italy
- 1859–2014
- Flag Coat of arms

- Map highlighting the location of the province of Bologna in Italy
- Capital: Bologna
- Area
  - Coordinates
  - 2015: 3,702.32 km^{2} (1,429.47 sq mi)
- Population
  - 2015: 1,004,323
- History
  - Established: 30 November 1859
  - Disestablished: 31 December 2014
- Today part of: Metropolitan City of Bologna

The province of Bologna (Italian: provincia di Bologna) was a province in the Emilia-Romagna region of Italy. Its provincial capital was the city of Bologna. The province of Bologna covered an area of 3,702.32 square kilometres (1,429.47 mi^{2}) and had a total population of 1,004,323 inhabitants as of 31 December 2014, giving it a population density of 271.27 inhabitants per square kilometre. It was replaced by the Metropolitan City of Bologna starting from January 2015.

== Geography ==
The province of Bologna was one of nine provinces in the region of Emilia-Romagna in northwestern Italy from 1859 to 2014. It was bounded on the east by the Province of Ravenna, the Province of Ferrara lies to the north and the Province of Modena lies to the west. To the south were the Province of Florence, the Province of Prato and the Province of Pistoia, all in the region of Tuscany. The Province stretches from the alluvial Po Plain into the Apennine Mountains; the highest point was the province is the peak of Corno alle Scale in the commune of Lizzano in Belvedere, which is 1,945 metres (6,381 ft) above sea level.

Coat of Arms of 1933

== List of comuni ==
- Alto Reno Terme
- Anzola dell'Emilia
- Argelato
- Baricella
- Bentivoglio
- Bologna
- Borgo Tossignano
- Budrio
- Calderara di Reno
- Camugnano
- Casalecchio di Reno
- Casalfiumanese
- Castel d'Aiano
- Castel del Rio
- Castel di Casio
- Castel Guelfo di Bologna
- Castel Maggiore
- Castel San Pietro Terme
- Castello d'Argile
- Castenaso
- Castiglione dei Pepoli
- Crevalcore
- Dozza
- Fontanelice
- Gaggio Montano
- Galliera
- Granarolo dell'Emilia
- Grizzana Morandi
- Imola
- Lizzano in Belvedere
- Loiano
- Malalbergo
- Marzabotto
- Medicina
- Minerbio
- Molinella
- Monghidoro
- Monte San Pietro
- Monterenzio
- Monzuno
- Mordano
- Ozzano dell'Emilia
- Pianoro
- Pieve di Cento
- Sala Bolognese
- San Benedetto Val di Sambro
- San Giorgio di Piano
- San Giovanni in Persiceto
- San Lazzaro di Savena
- San Pietro in Casale
- Sant'Agata Bolognese
- Sasso Marconi
- Valsamoggia
- Vergato
- Zola Predosa

== See also ==
- Metropolitan City of Bologna
