= Castello d'Argile =

- Comune
- Comune di Castello d'Argile
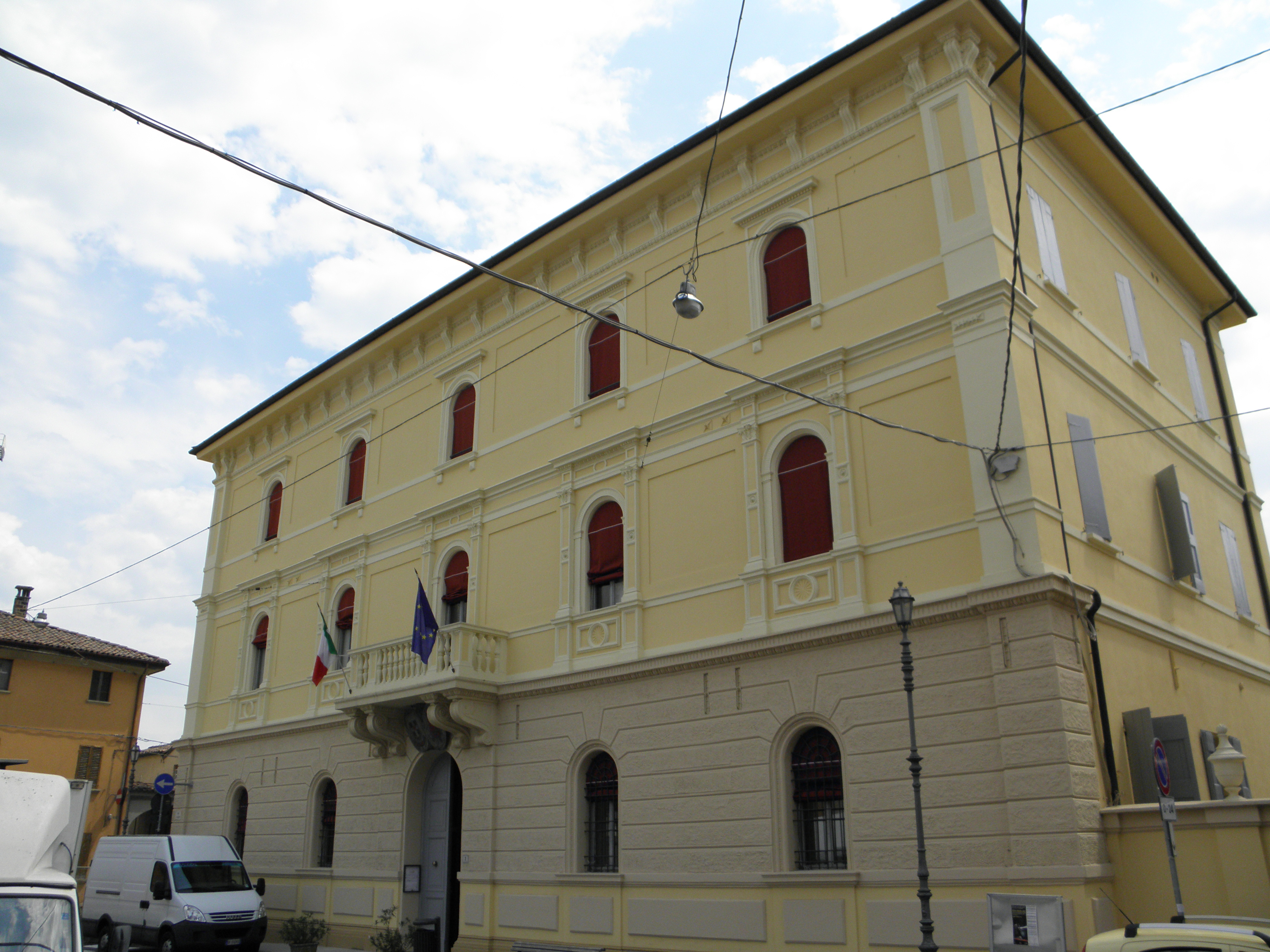
- Town hall.

- Coat of arms

- Location within Italy Location within Emilia-Romagna
- Coordinates: 44°41′N 11°18′E
- Country: Italy
- Region: Emilia-Romagna
- Metropolitan city: Bologna (BO)

Government
  - Mayor: Alessandro Erriquez

Area
  - Total: 29.1 km^{2} (11.2 sq mi)
- Elevation: 23 m (75 ft)

Population (30 June 2017)
  - Total: 6,509
  - Density: 224/km^{2} (579/sq mi)
- Demonym: Argilesi
- Time zone: UTC+1 (CET)
  - Summer (DST): UTC+2 (CEST)
- Postal code: 40050
- Dialing code: 051
- Website: Official website

Castello d'Argile (Northern Bolognese: Castèl d'Èrzen) is a comune (municipality) in the Metropolitan City of Bologna in the Italian region Emilia-Romagna, located about 20 kilometres (12 mi) north of Bologna.

Castello d'Argile borders the following municipalities: Argelato, Cento, Pieve di Cento, Sala Bolognese, San Giorgio di Piano, San Giovanni in Persiceto, San Pietro in Casale.
