= Civico Orto Botanico "Ulisse Aldrovandi" =

Botanical garden in Emilia-Romagna, Italy

Coordinates: 44.6333°N 11.1833°E

The Civico Orto Botanico "Ulisse Aldrovandi", also known as Civico Giardino Botanico "Ulisse Aldrovandi", is a municipal botanical garden located at Vicolo Baciadonne 1 I-40017 San Giovanni in Persiceto, Emilia-Romagna, Italy.

The garden was established in 1985, and named in honor of celebrated natural historian Ulisse Aldrovandi. It now contains about 300 types of plants local to the Po Valley and Emilia-Romagna, as well as an astronomical observatory, planetarium, museum with collection of meteorites and other stones, all of which form part of the Museo del Cielo e della Terra.

== See also ==
- List of botanical gardens in Italy
