= Monte San Pietro =

- Comune
- Comune di Monte San Pietro
- Location within Italy Location within Emilia-Romagna
- Coordinates: 44°28′N 11°12′E
- Country: Italy
- Region: Emilia-Romagna
- Metropolitan city: Bologna (BO)

Government
  - Mayor: Monica Cinti

Area
  - Total: 74.7 km^{2} (28.8 sq mi)
- Elevation: 112 m (367 ft)

Population (30 November 2017)
  - Total: 10,972
  - Density: 147/km^{2} (380/sq mi)
- Demonym: Montesampietrini or Sampietrini
- Time zone: UTC+1 (CET)
  - Summer (DST): UTC+2 (CEST)
- Postal code: 40050
- Dialing code: 051
- Website: Official website

Monte San Pietro (Medial Mountain Bolognese: Måunt San Pîtr) is a comune (municipality) in the Metropolitan City of Bologna in the Italian region Emilia-Romagna, located about 12 kilometres (7 mi) southwest of Bologna.

Monte San Pietro borders the following municipalities: Marzabotto, Sasso Marconi, Valsamoggia, Zola Predosa.
