= Metropolitan City of Bologna =

Metropolitan City of Bologna, located in the Emilia-Romagna region

Metropolitan City of Bologna Città metropolitana di Bologna (Italian)
- Metropolitan City
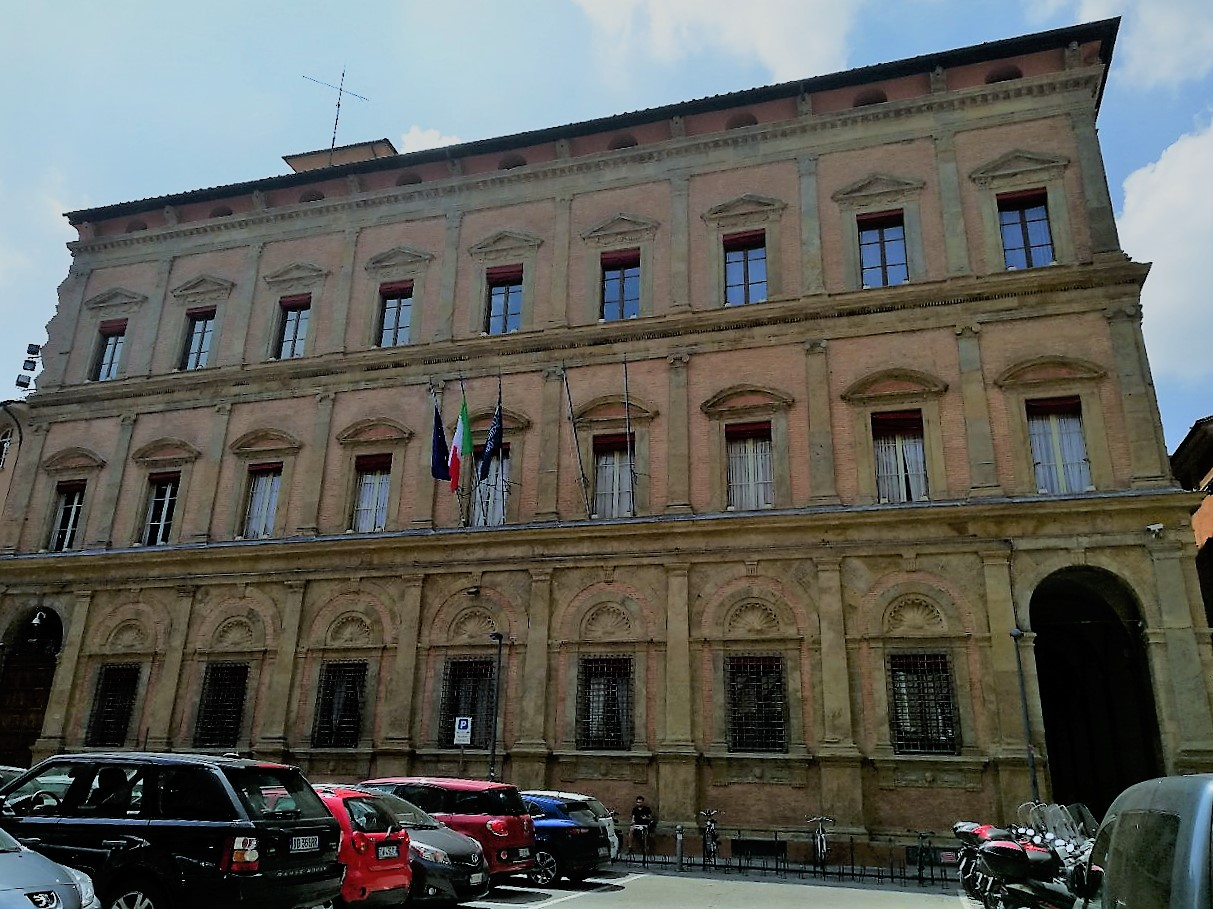
- Palazzo Malvezzi, the Metropolitan City seat

- Flag Coat of arms

- Location of the Metropolitan City of Bologna in Italy
- Coordinates: 44.4939°N 11.3428°E
- Country: Italy
- Region: Emilia-Romagna
- Capital(s): Bologna
- Municipalities: 55

Government
  - Metropolitan mayor: Matteo Lepore

Area
  - Total: 3,702.32 km^{2} (1,429.47 sq mi)

Population (2026)
  - Total: 1,024,290
  - Density: 276.662/km^{2} (716.550/sq mi)

GDP
  - Metro: €39.502 billion (2015)
  - Per capita: €38,918 (2015)
- Time zone: UTC+1 (CET)
  - Summer (DST): UTC+2 (CEST)
- Postal code: 40121/40141 (Bologna), 40010–40069 (other municipalities)
- Telephone prefix: 051, 0534, 0542
- ISO 3166 code: IT-BO
- Vehicle registration: BO
- ISTAT: 237
- Website: Official website

The Metropolitan City of Bologna (Italian: città metropolitana di Bologna) is a metropolitan city in the region of Emilia-Romagna in Italy. Its capital is de facto the city of Bologna, though the body does not explicitly outline it. It was created by the reform of local authorities (Law 142/1990) and established by the Law 56/2014, replacing the province of Bologna. It has been operative since 1 January 2015. With a population of 1,024,290, it is the 8th-largest metropolitan city in Italy.

The Metropolitan City is headed by the Metropolitan Mayor (sindaco metropolitano) and by the Metropolitan Council (consiglio metropolitano).

== History ==
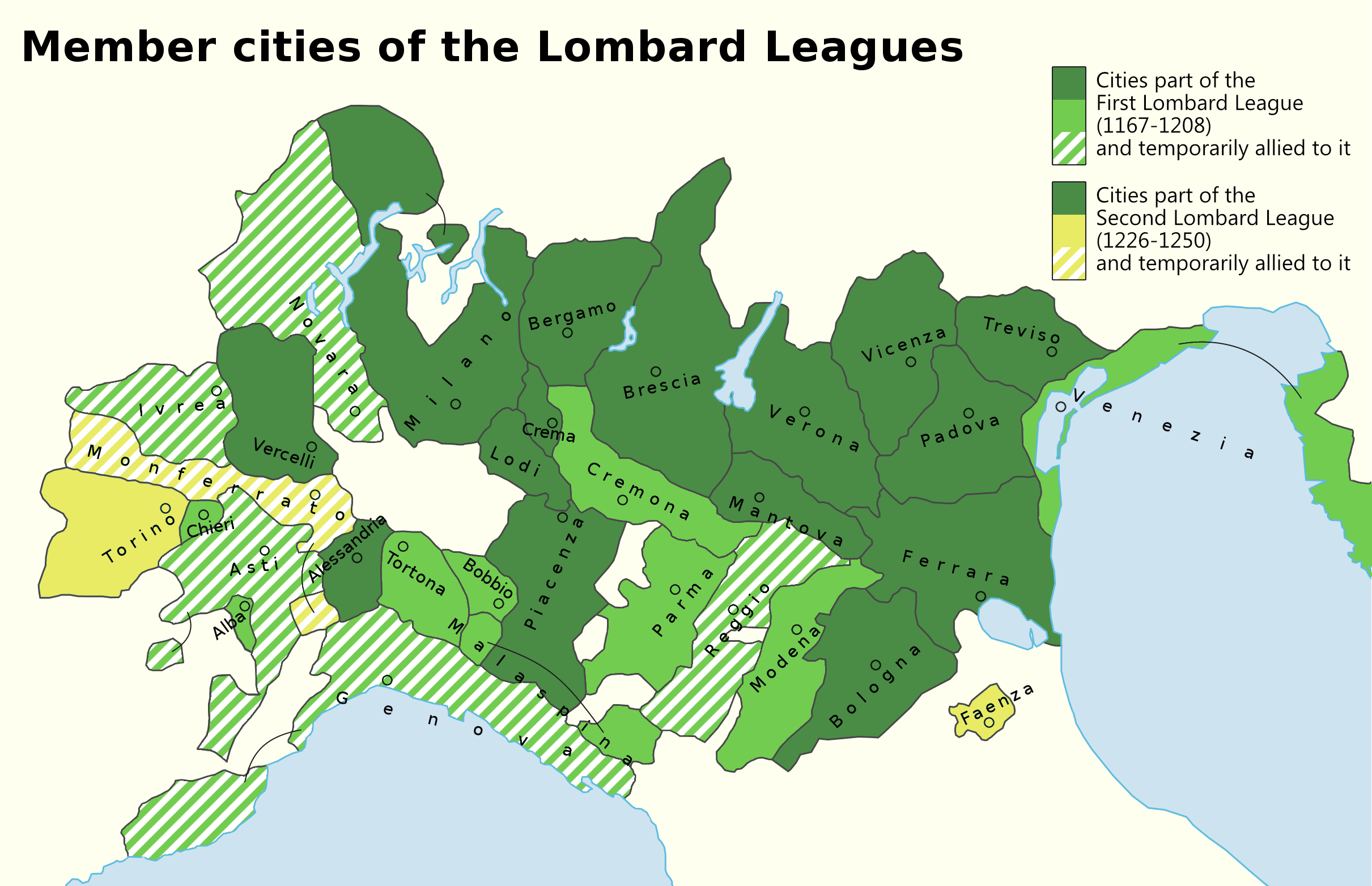
Member cities of the first and second Lombard League.

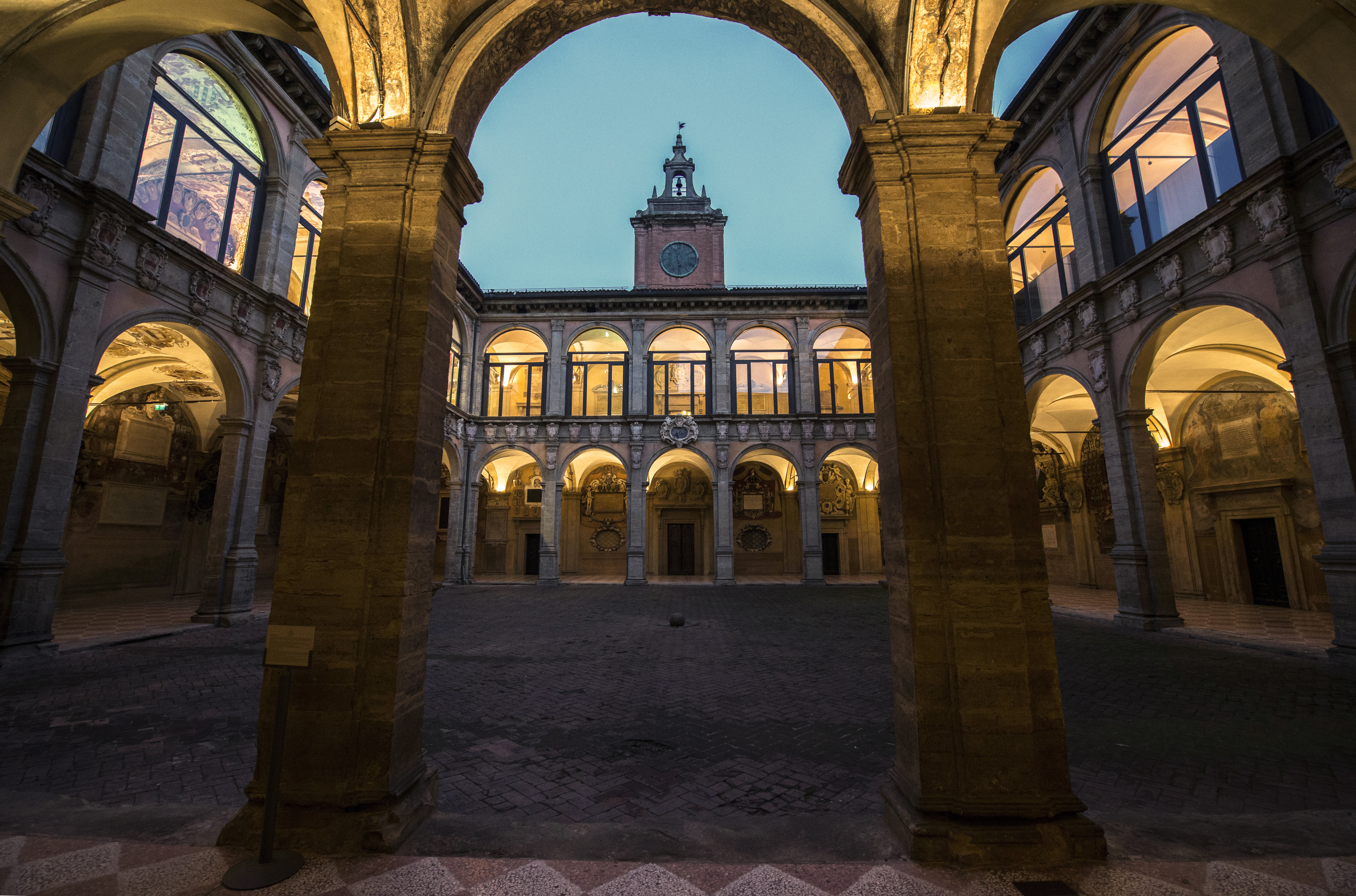
The University of Bologna, founded in 1088, is the world's oldest university in continuous operation.

Remains of the Iron Age Villanovan culture were discovered near Bologna by archaeologists in 1853. The city was settled by the Etruscans and named Velzna, later Felsina. In the 6th century BCE, Felsina was known for its markets and trade. It was invaded by the Gallic Boii tribe in this period, who developed the agricultural output of the region. The Romans began their conquest of the region around 220 BCE and were successful by the 180s BCE; upon their capture of Felsina, it was renamed Bononia. After Rome fell in 476 CE and the region suffered barbarian invasions, Bononia was made a fortress.

The city was owned by Charlemagne but was given to the Holy See in 774. Later, the Holy Roman Empire controlled the city and it became known as Bologna. Bologna became a commune by 1114, but it desired independence and in 1176 it joined the Lombard League, an alliance opposed to the Holy Roman Empire's influence. Emperor Frederick I recognised its desire for independence and granted it some autonomy. It joined the Second Lombard League to defeat Frederick II in 1249. Bologna became part of the Papal States in 1506 and joined the Kingdom of Italy upon Italian unification in the 19th century.

The University of Bologna, founded in 1088, is the world's oldest university in continuous operation; its speciality was Roman and canon law, and it set standards in the way it was organised and the curriculum that was followed by universities in Italy.

== Geography ==
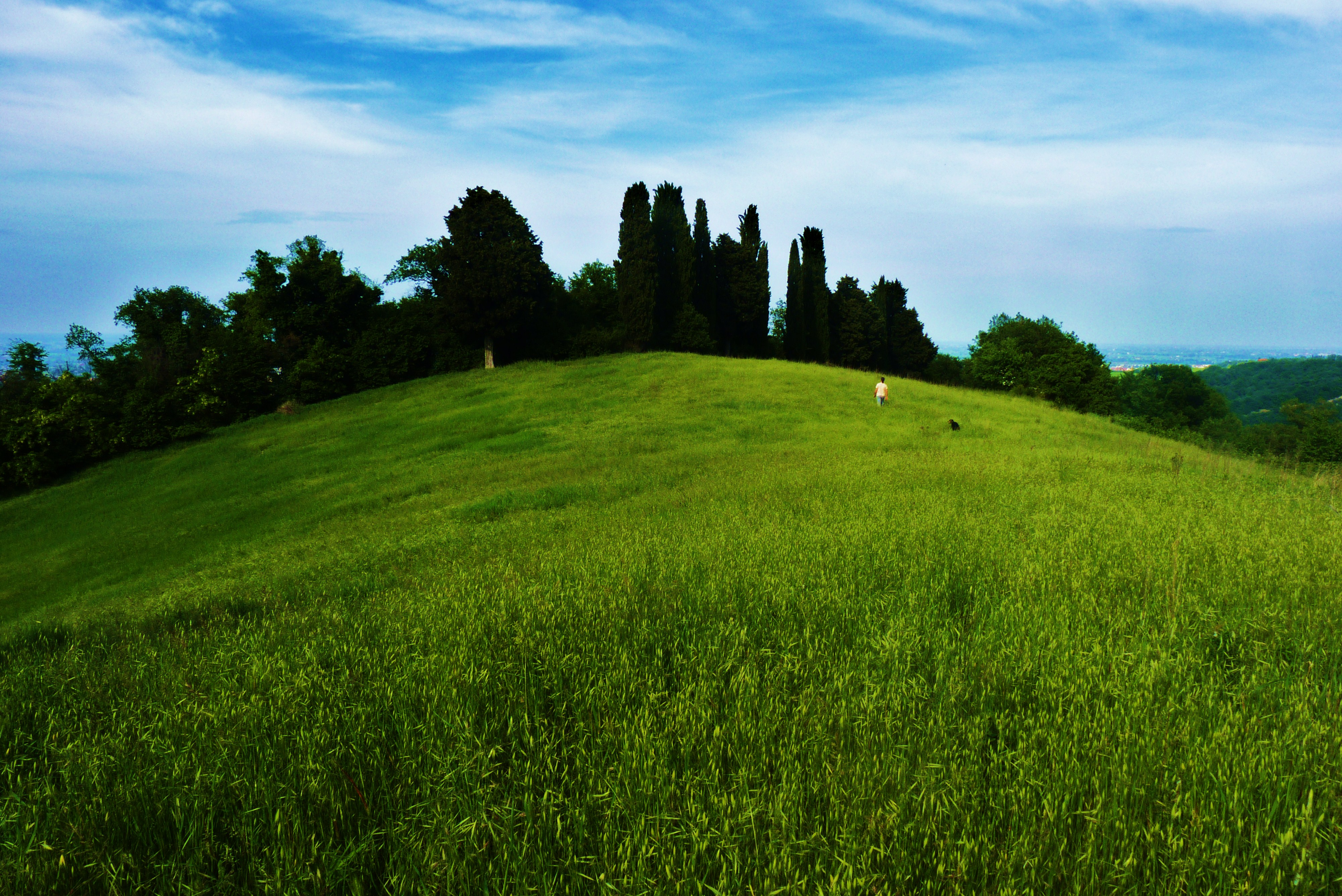
Hills around Bologna

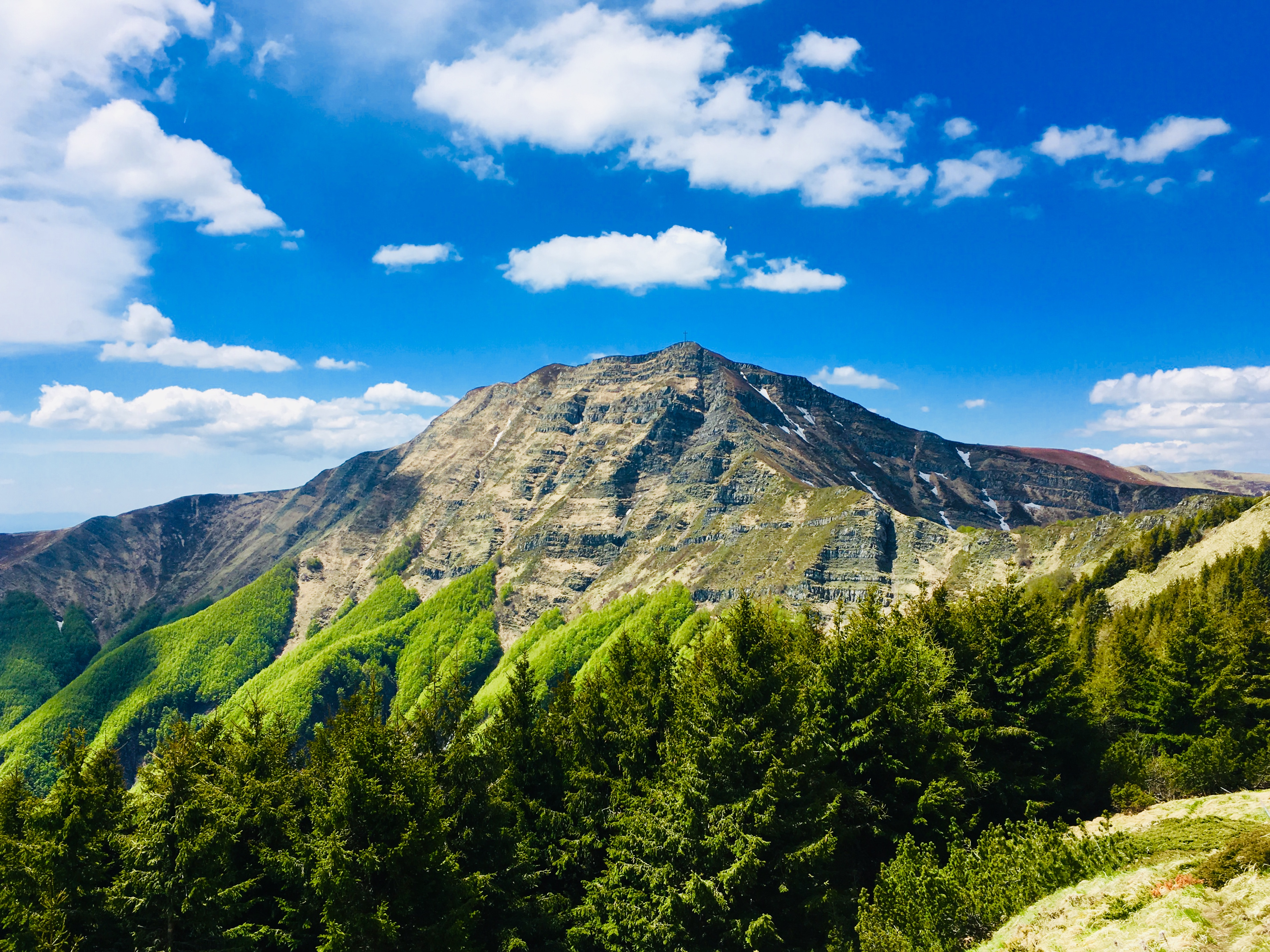
Corno alle Scale

The Metropolitan City of Bologna is part of the region of Emilia-Romagna in northwestern Italy. It is in the centre of the region and is bounded on the east by the province of Ravenna, while the province of Ferrara lies to the north and the province of Modena lies to the west. To the south are the Metropolitan City of Florence, the province of Prato and the province of Pistoia, all in the region of Tuscany.

The metropolitan territory is largely flat, and stretches from the alluvial Po Plain into the Apennine Mountains; the highest point in the metropolitan city is the peak of Corno alle Scale in the commune of Lizzano in Belvedere, at 1,945 metres (6,381 ft) above sea level. The municipality with the lowest average altitude is Molinella which is 8 metres above sea level. The municipality with the highest average altitude is Monghidoro 841 metres above sea level.

The metropolitan city of Bologna includes south-eastern Emilia and seven municipalities whose territory is entirely included in the historical-geographical region of Romagna: Borgo Tossignano, Casalfiumanese, Castel del Rio, Dozza, Fontanelice, Imola and Mordano. The provincial territory extends mainly across plains and hills. The mountain occupies 21.3% of the province, against a regional average of 25%, and is divided between the Bolognese Apennines and the Imola Apennines.

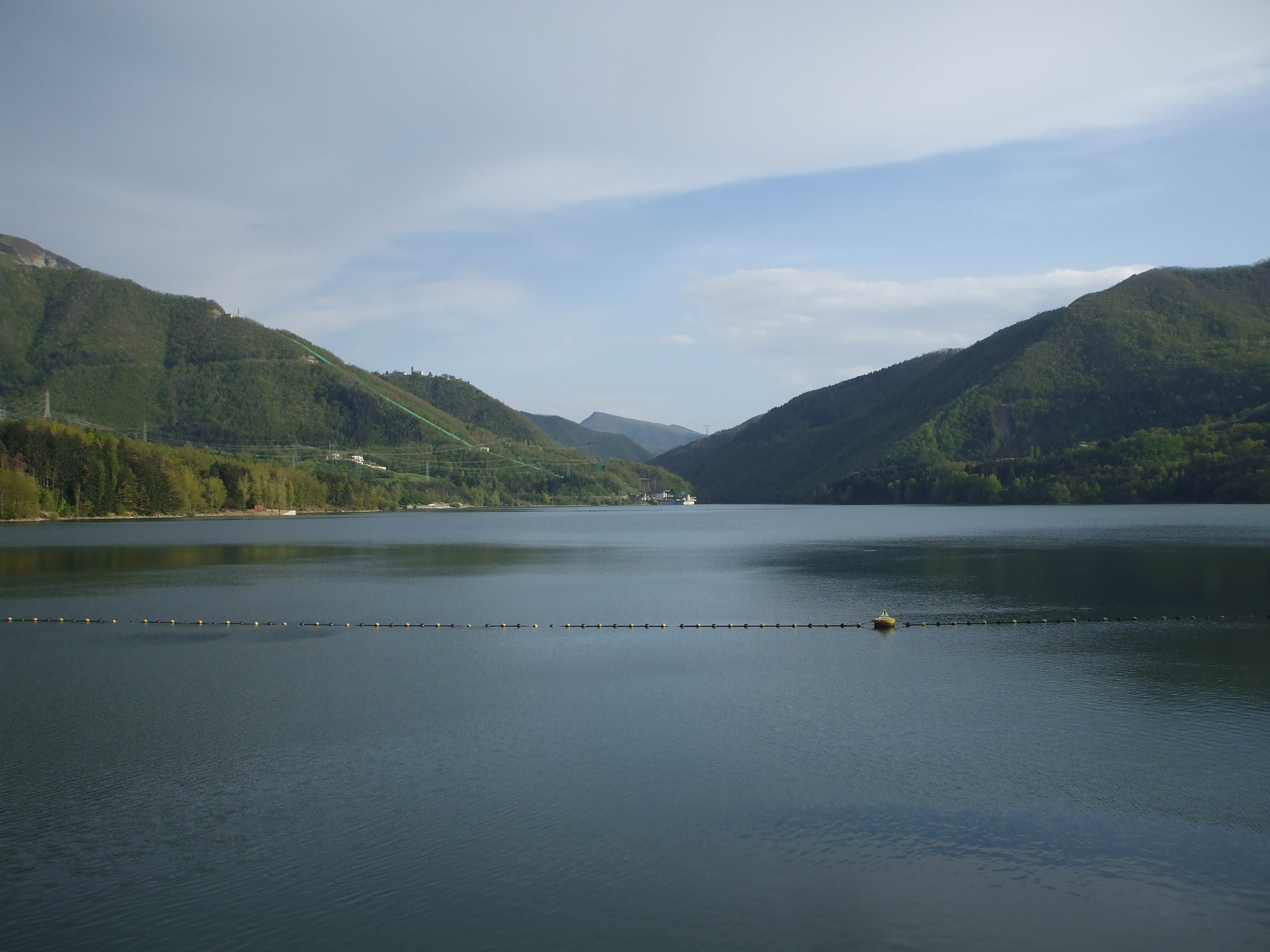
Suviana and Brasimone lakes regional park

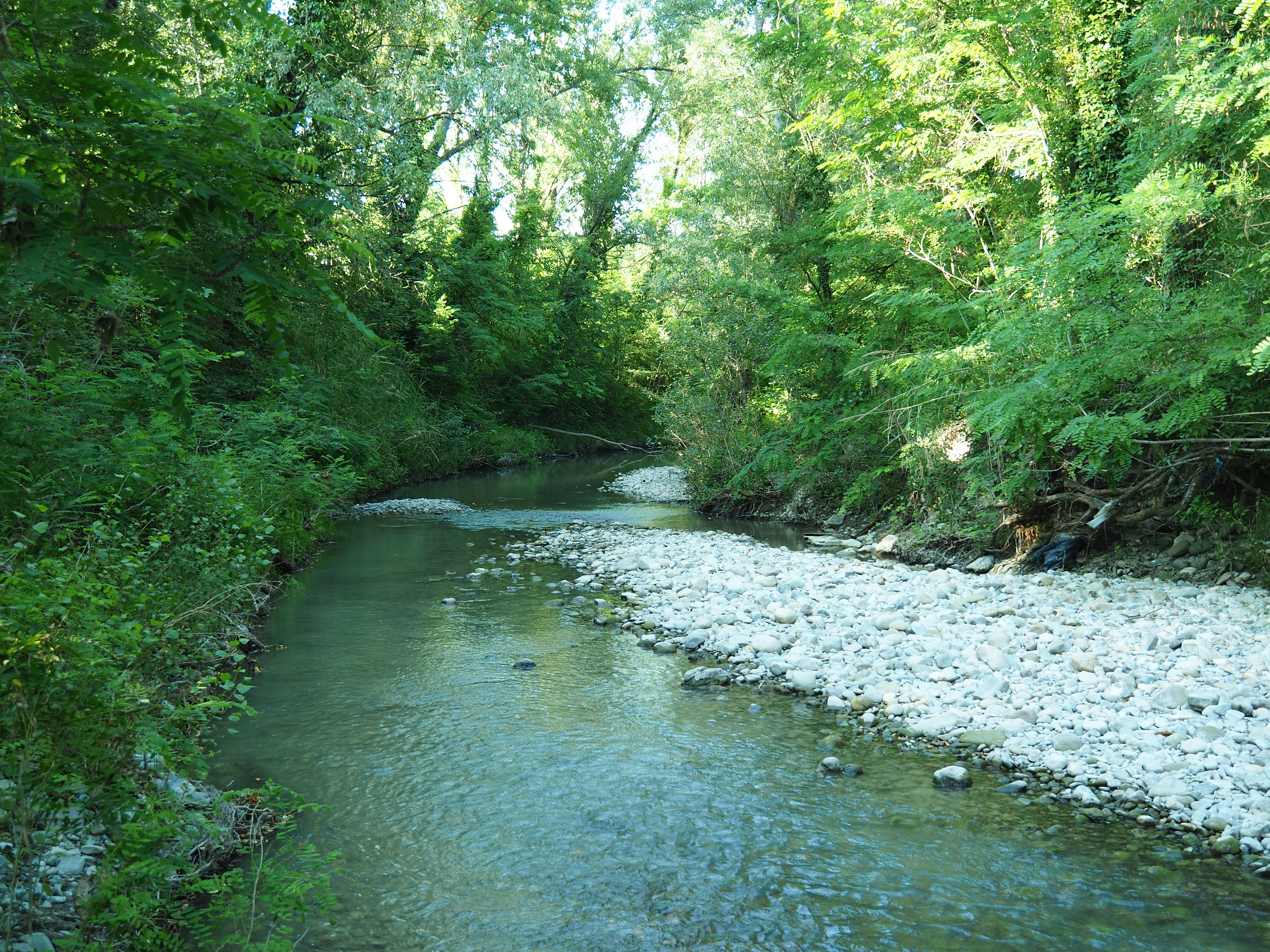
Molino Grande River Oasis

The main rivers that cross the territory are the Reno (211 km), which collects almost all the waters of the Bolognese area, the Santerno (85 km), the Idice (77 km), the Sillaro (66 km), the Savena (54 km), the Samoggia (53 km) and the Setta (40 km). Worthy of note for its particularity is the Dardagna torrent, the only river in the territory of the metropolitan city which, flowing into the Panaro, is part of the Po water basin.

In the extensive hill system, two ridges stand out which are located transversally to the main valleys: the Pliocene Buttress and the Chalk Vein. Characteristic are the gullies, hilly formations dug by the flow of rain on the clayey slopes of different densities, present along the Chalk Vein on the hills from Reggio nell'Emilia to the province of Rimini.

=== Natural areas ===
The flora and fauna heritage of the metropolitan area is managed through a system represented by 21 protected areas and 31 sites of community importance. The total surface area in October 2004 amounted to 710.684 acres (equal to 19.36% of the provincial surface area). Inside the Metropolitan city of Bologna are present 5 Regional Parks (Corno alle Scale, Gessi Bolognesi and Calanchi dell'Abbadessa, Monte Sole, Monteveglio Abbey, Suviana and Brasimone Lake), 2 Provincial Parks (Montovolo, La Martina), 1 Nature Reserve (Countrafforte Nature Reserve Pliocene), 13 Ecological Rebalancing Areas (ARE). Furthermore, 70 different species among those listed in Annex I of the "Birds" Directive have been registered in the area.

== Demographics ==
Historical population
Year	Pop.	±%
1861	415,217	—
1871	445,251	+7.2%
1881	460,835	+3.5%
1901	520,750	+13.0%
1911	575,632	+10.5%
1921	634,388	+10.2%
1931	687,669	+8.4%
1936	714,705	+3.9%
1951	763,907	+6.9%
1961	841,474	+10.2%
1971	918,844	+9.2%
1981	930,284	+1.2%
1991	906,856	−2.5%
2001	915,225	+0.9%
2011	976,243	+6.7%
2021	1,010,812	+3.5%
Source: ISTAT

As of 2026, the population is 1,024,290, of which 48.7% are male, and 51.3% are female. Minors make up 14.1% of the population, and seniors make up 25.2%.

=== Immigration ===
As of 2025, immigrants make up 15.2% of the total population. The 5 largest foreign countries of birth are Romania, Morocco, Moldova, Albania, and Pakistan.

== Government ==
=== List of metropolitan mayors ===
N.	Portrait	Metropolitan Mayor	Term start	Term end	Party
1		Virginio Merola (1955–)	1 January 2015	11 October 2021	Democratic Party
2		Matteo Lepore (1980–)	11 October 2021	Incumbent	Democratic Party

=== Municipalities ===
Map of the cultural districts of the Metropolitan City of Bologna

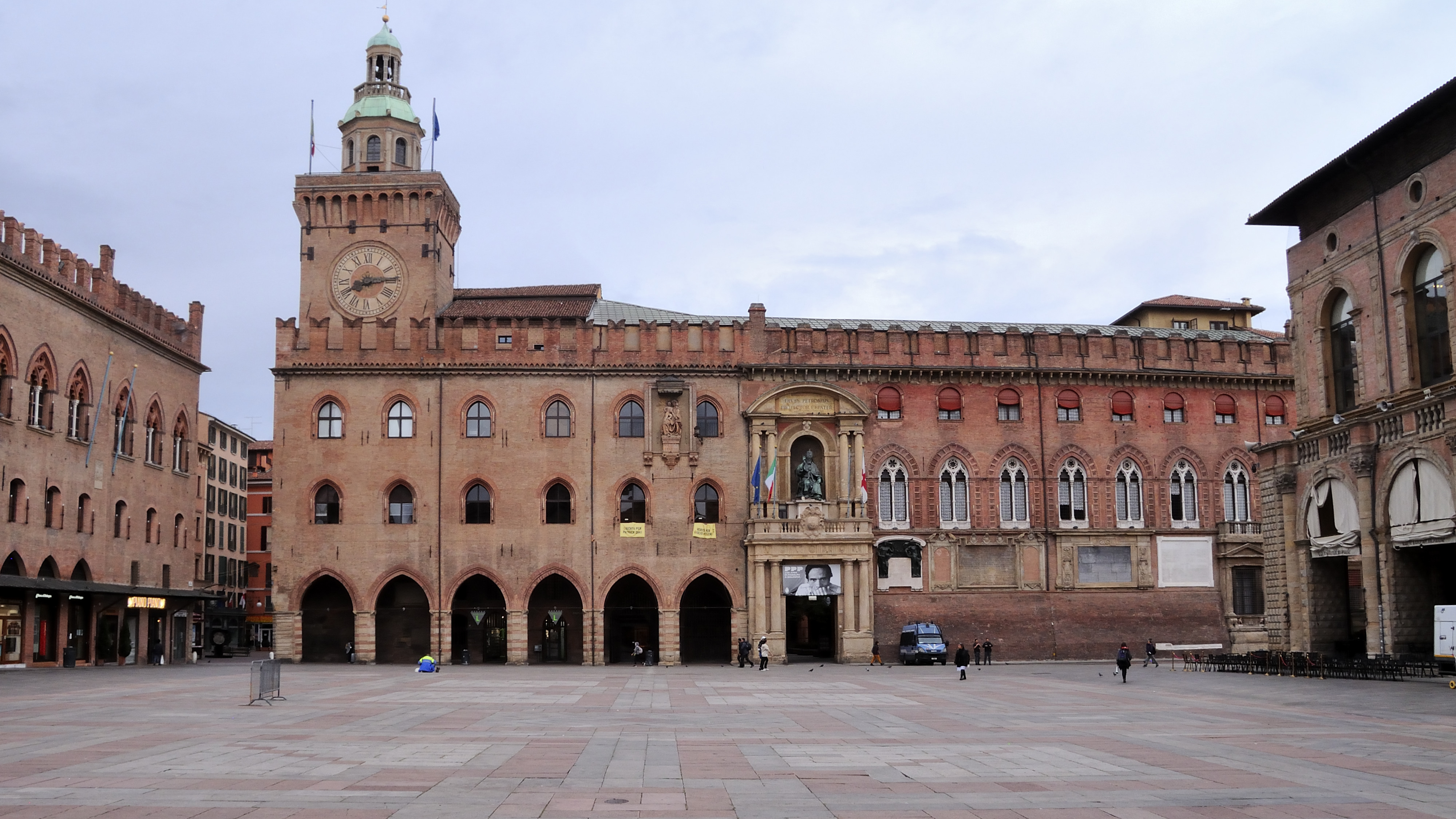
Bologna

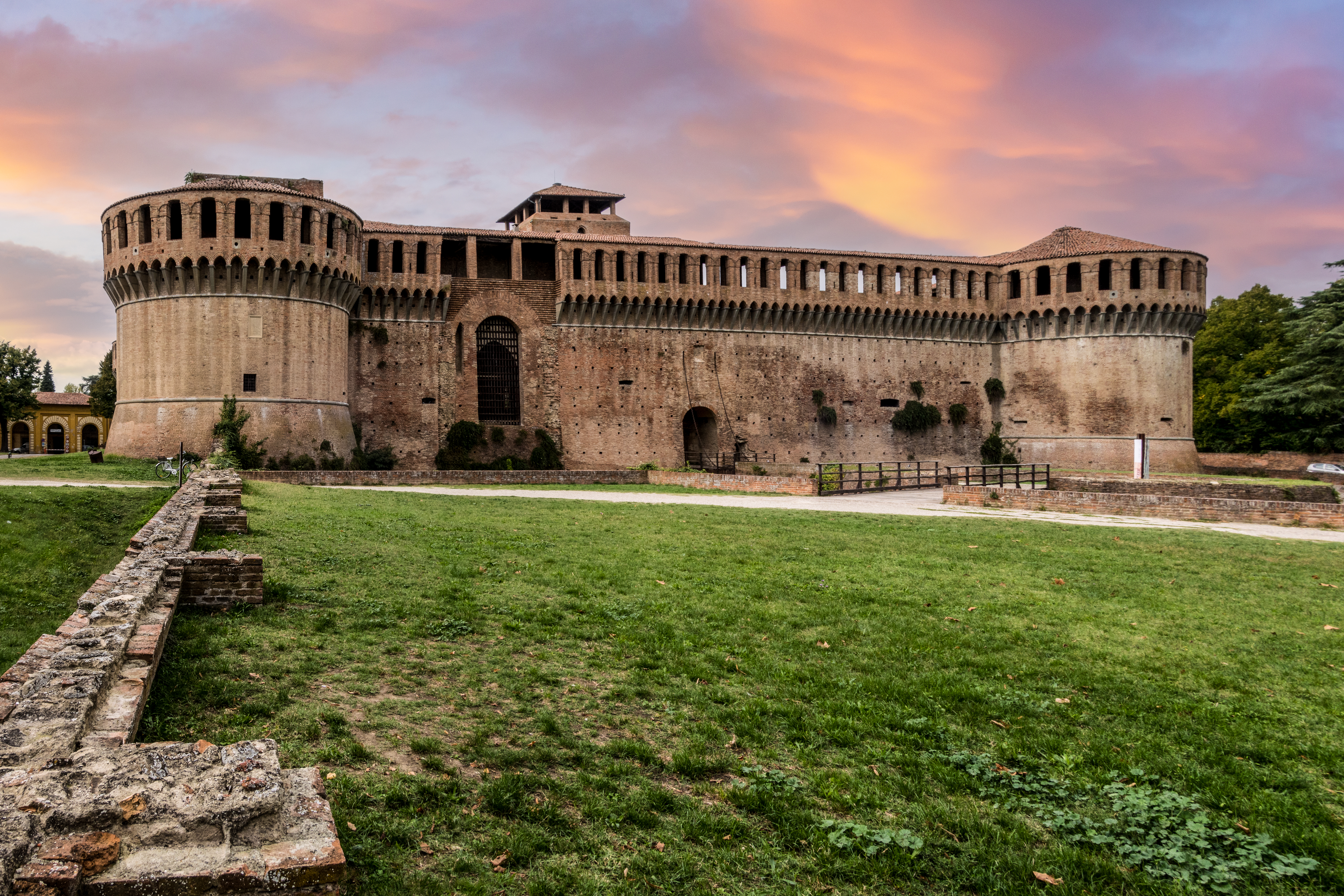
Imola

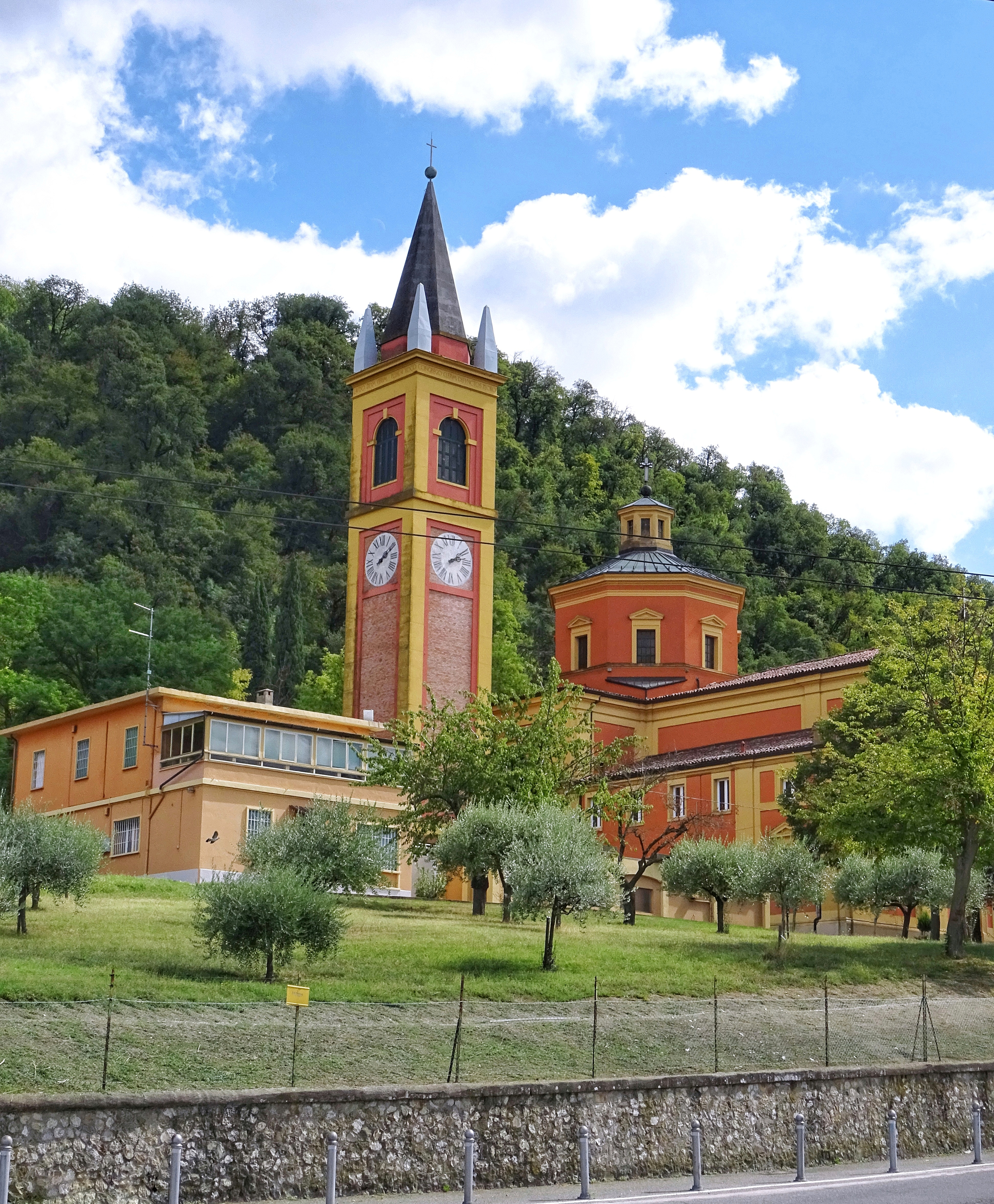
Casalecchio di Reno

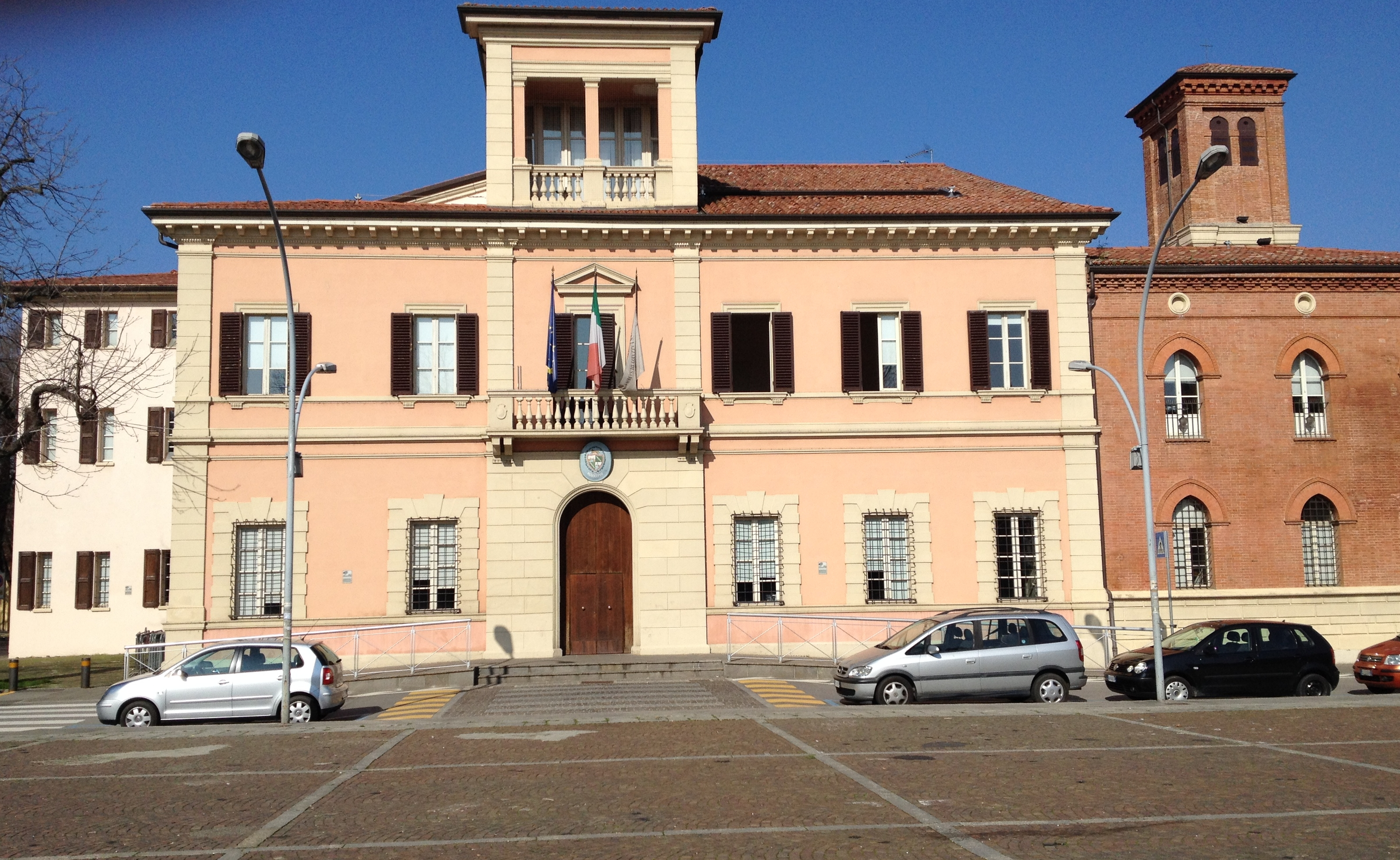
San Lazzaro di Savena

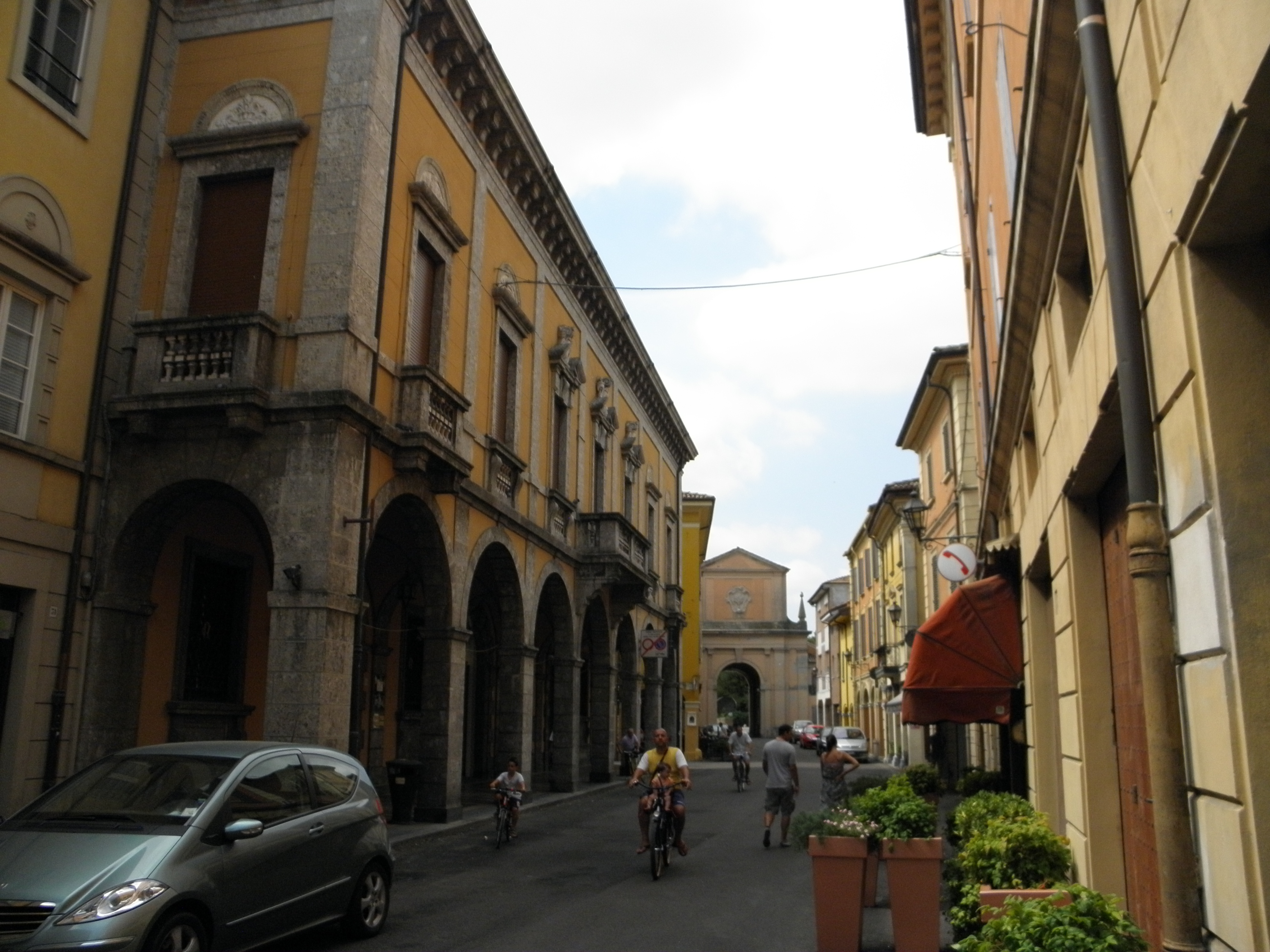
San Giovanni in Persiceto

The metropolitan city has 55 municipalities:

- Alto Reno Terme
- Anzola dell'Emilia
- Argelato
- Baricella
- Bentivoglio
- Bologna
- Borgo Tossignano
- Budrio
- Calderara di Reno
- Camugnano
- Casalecchio di Reno
- Casalfiumanese
- Castel d'Aiano
- Castel del Rio
- Castel di Casio
- Castel Guelfo di Bologna
- Castel Maggiore
- Castel San Pietro Terme
- Castello d'Argile
- Castenaso
- Castiglione dei Pepoli
- Crevalcore
- Dozza
- Fontanelice
- Gaggio Montano
- Galliera
- Granarolo dell'Emilia
- Grizzana Morandi
- Imola
- Lizzano in Belvedere
- Loiano
- Malalbergo
- Marzabotto
- Medicina
- Minerbio
- Molinella
- Monghidoro
- Monte San Pietro
- Monterenzio
- Monzuno
- Mordano
- Ozzano dell'Emilia
- Pianoro
- Pieve di Cento
- Sala Bolognese
- San Benedetto Val di Sambro
- San Giorgio di Piano
- San Giovanni in Persiceto
- San Lazzaro di Savena
- San Pietro in Casale
- Sant'Agata Bolognese
- Sasso Marconi
- Valsamoggia
- Vergato
- Zola Predosa

== Economy ==
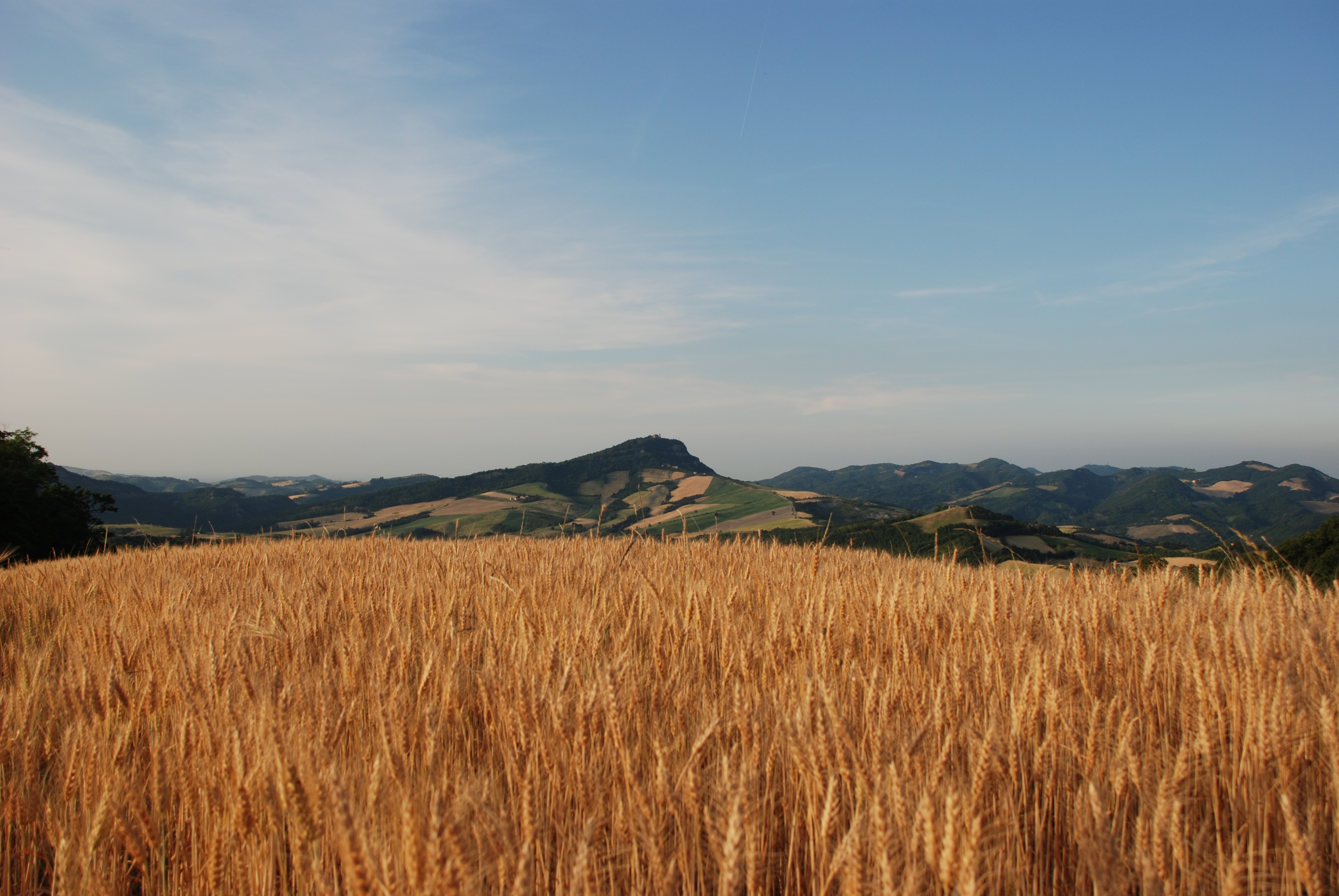
Wheat fields in Pianoro

The driving sectors of the regional economy are: agriculture (vegetables, cereals – the famous DOP potato from Budrio), breeding (pigs and cattle) and small and medium industry in the food, mechanical, ceramic and electronics.

In the motor sector, companies such as motorcycle manufacturing company Ducati, luxury sports cars and SUVs based in Sant'Agata Bolognese Lamborghini (The company is owned by the Volkswagen Group through its subsidiary Audi), Italian bicycle, scooter and motorcycle company based in San Lazzaro di Savena Malaguti, the italian headquarters of Volvo, Saab Italia, motorcycle manufacturer Moto Morini (from 1937 to 2014), and bus manufacturer BredaMenarinibus are based here.

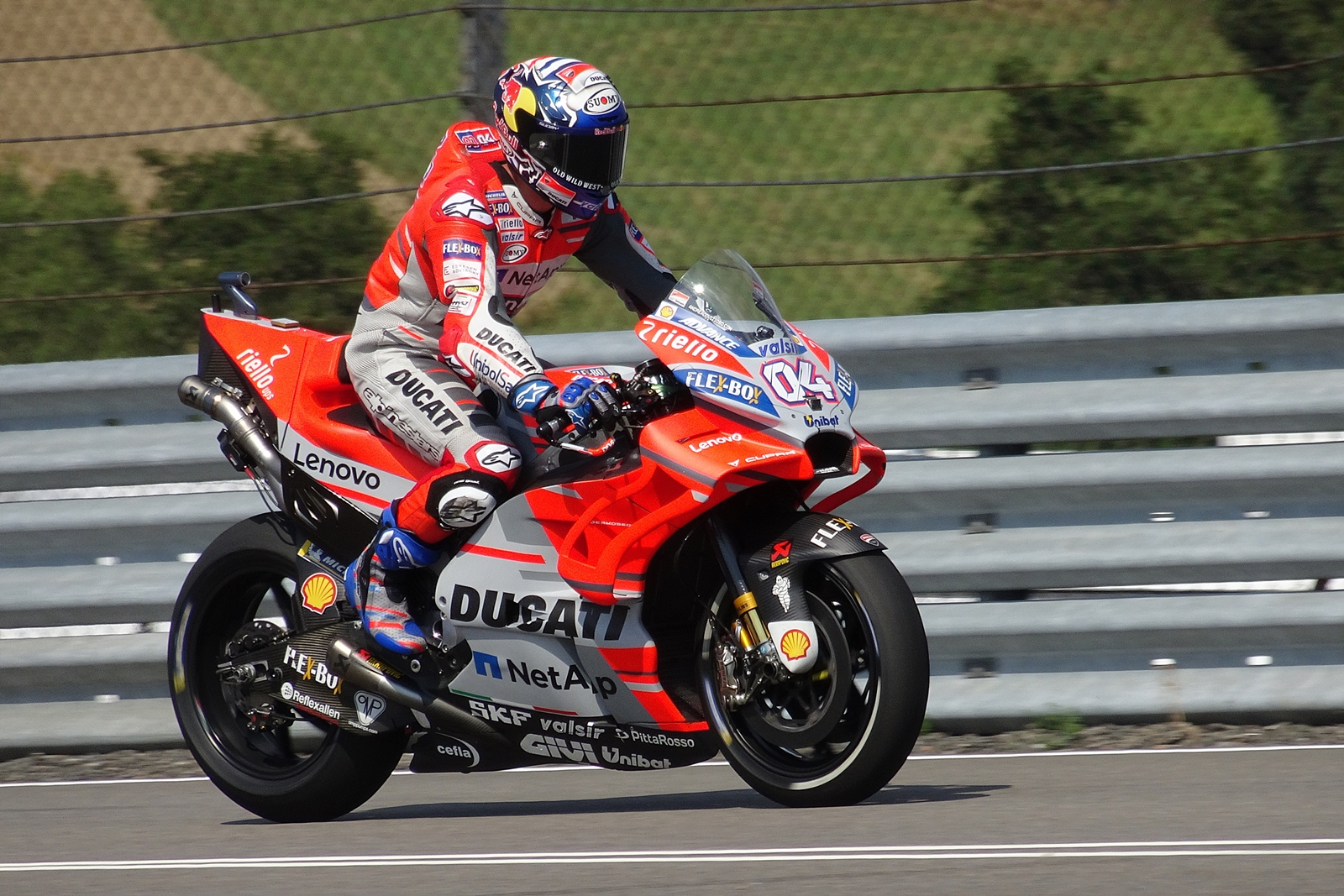
Ducati Desmosedici by Ducati Corse, one of the most successful motorcycle racing team in history

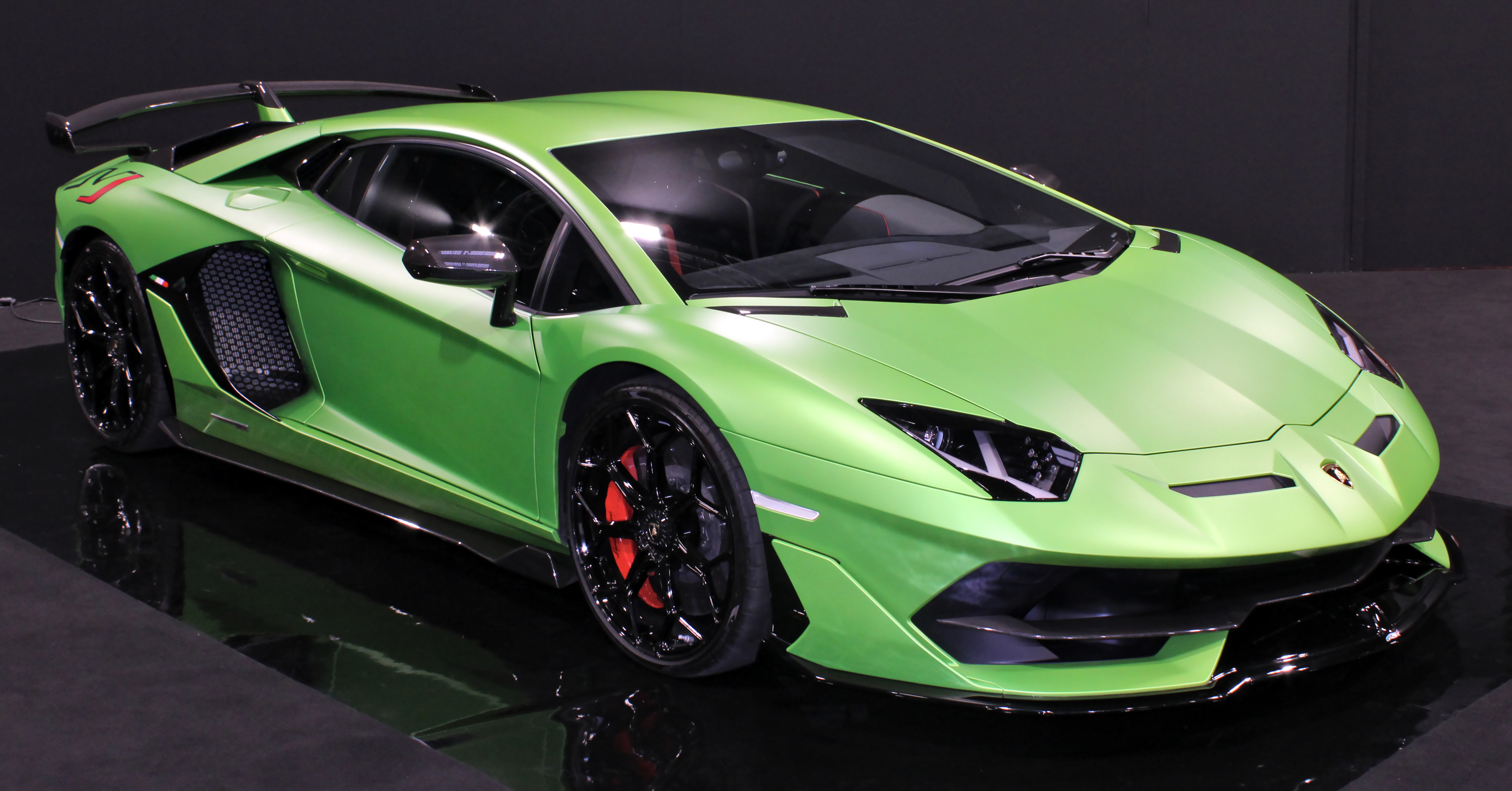
Lamborghini Aventador

In the metalworking sector there are Malossi, Marzocchi, Paioli, Minarelli, Viro, while in the electronic machinery and automatic machines sector, Saeco, Datalogic, Beghelli, FAAC, IMA, SACMI, Marchesini.

Among the highly relevant agri-food industries in Bologna we find: in the food sector Granarolo, Fabbri, Segafredo Zanetti, Montenegro, Valsoia, the Conserve Italia consortium (to which the Cirio, Yoga, Valfrutta, Derby Blue and Jolly Colombani), Eridania, Alcisa, Cremino maker Majani, Carpigiani, Cerelia Acqua Minerale, as well as the national offices of the food cooperatives Coop (Italy), Conad and Sigma, SISA and Despar.

In recent years, numerous start-ups in the field of information and communication technologies have been created in the Emilian capital.

Of note are the activities of the Bologna Fair, where international events are organised, the infrastructure of the Bologna Interport for the loading and unloading of goods arriving in containers from the port of Ravenna and the Centergross of Funo, founded in 1977 and a of the major commercial citadels of Europe.

== Transport ==
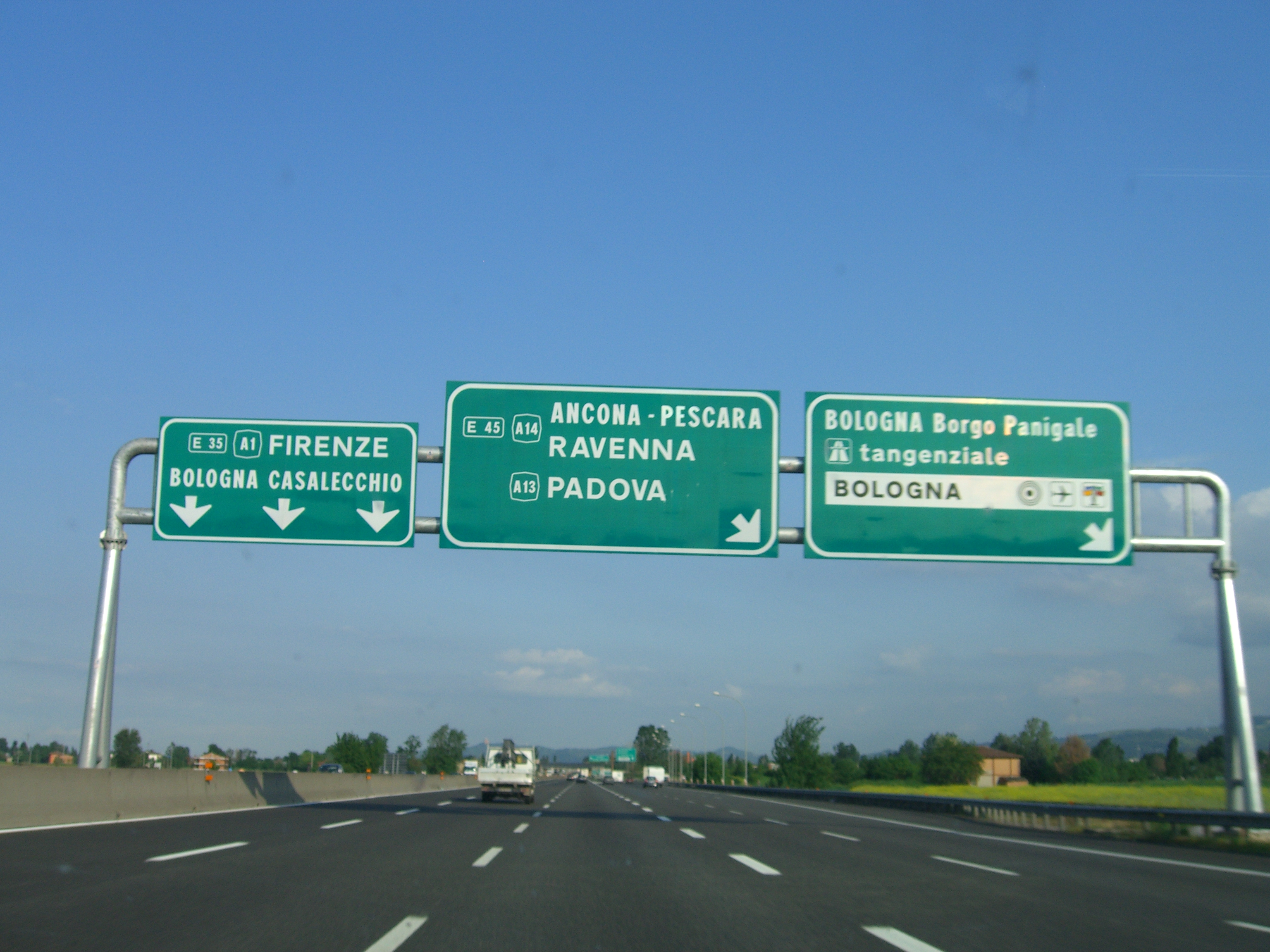
Autostrada A1 near Bologna

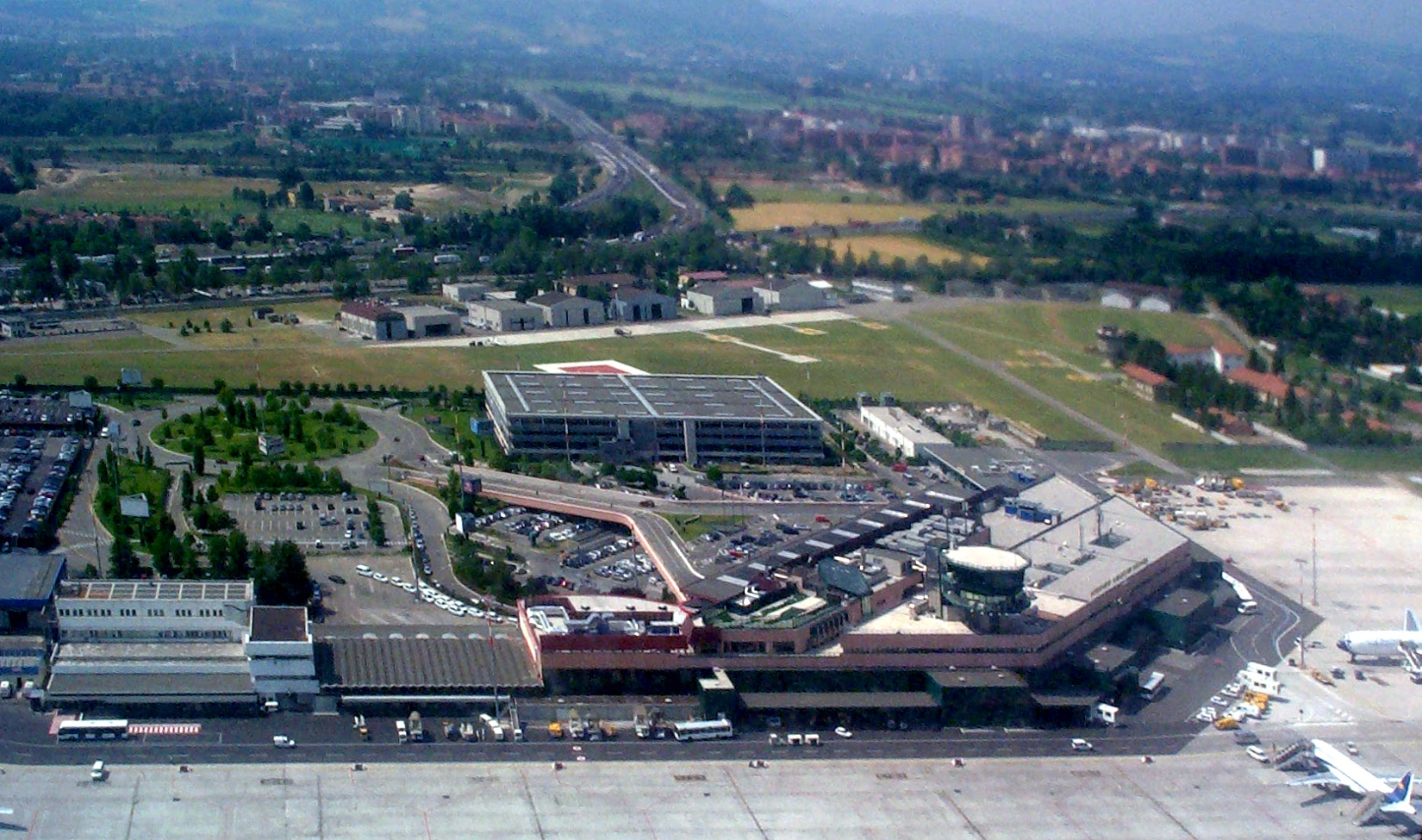
Bologna Guglielmo Marconi Airport

=== Motorways ===
- Autostrada A1: Milan-Naples
- Autostrada A13: Bologna-Padua
- Autostrada A14: Bologna -Taranto

=== Railway lines ===
- Milan–Bologna high-speed railway
- Bologna–Florence high-speed railway
- Casalecchio–Vignola railway
- Milan–Bologna railway
- Verona–Bologna railway
- Padua–Bologna railway
- Bologna–Ancona railway
- Bologna–Florence railway

=== Airports ===
- Bologna Guglielmo Marconi Airport

== See also ==
- Province of Bologna
