= San Giovanni in Persiceto =

- Comune
- Comune di San Giovanni in Persiceto
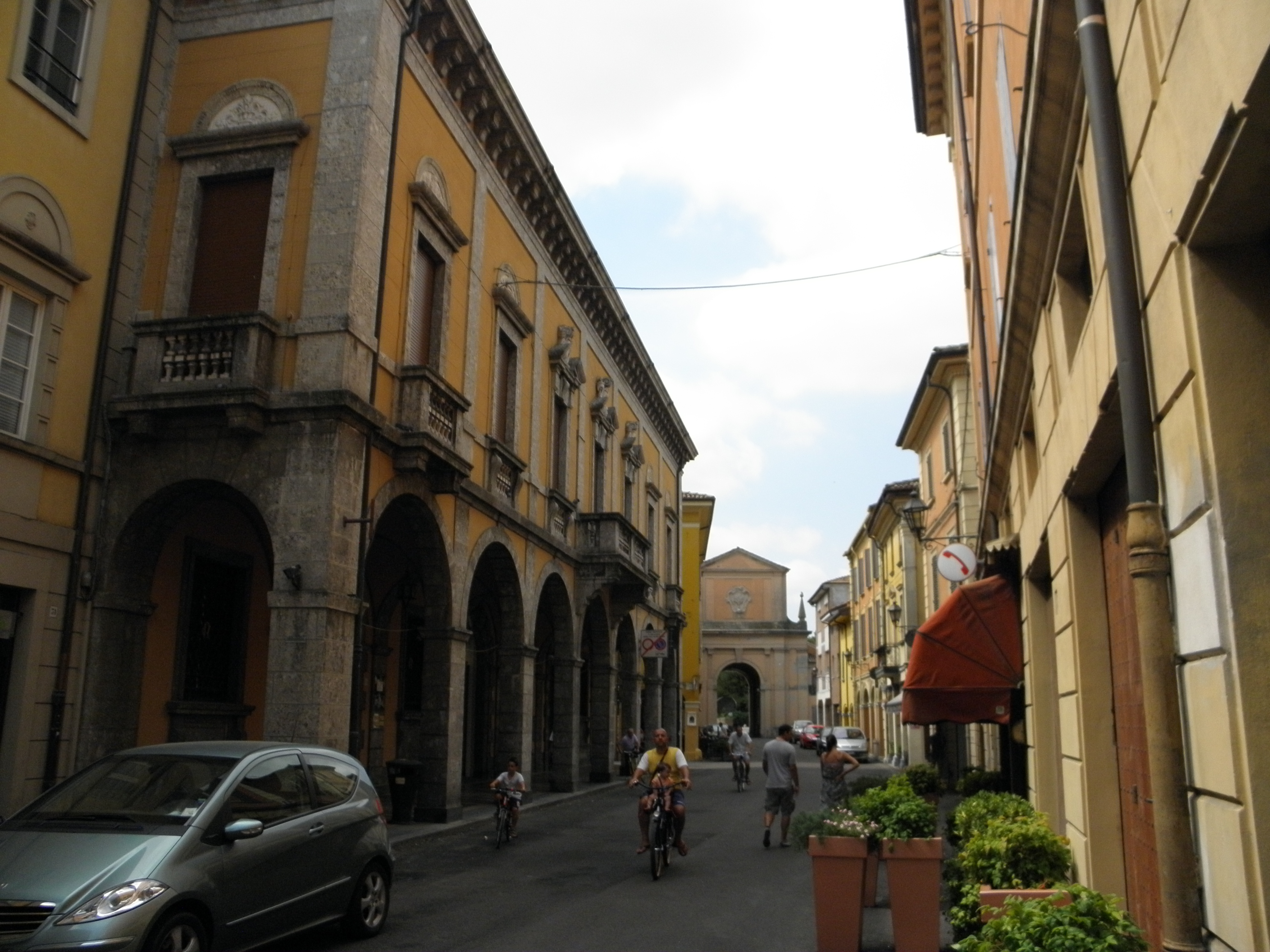

- Flag Coat of arms

- Location within Italy Location within Emilia-Romagna
- Coordinates: 44°38′N 11°11′E
- Country: Italy
- Region: Emilia-Romagna
- Metropolitan city: Bologna (BO)
- Frazioni: Amola, Arginone, Biancolina, Castagnolo, Castelletto, La Villa, Le Budrie, Lorenzatico, San Matteo della Decima, Tivoli, Zenerigolo

Government
  - Mayor: Lorenzo Pellegatti

Area
  - Total: 114.41 km^{2} (44.17 sq mi)
- Elevation: 21 m (69 ft)

Population (1 January 2017)
  - Total: 28,186
  - Density: 246.36/km^{2} (638.07/sq mi)
- Demonym: Persicetani
- Time zone: UTC+1 (CET)
  - Summer (DST): UTC+2 (CEST)
- Postal code: 40017
- Dialing code: 051
- Patron saint: St. John the Baptist
- Saint day: June 24
- Website: Official website

San Giovanni in Persiceto (from 1912 to 1927: Persiceto; Western Bolognese: San Żvân) is a comune (municipality) in the Metropolitan City of Bologna, in the Italian region of Emilia-Romagna.

Located in the northern part of the Metropolitan City, bordering with the provinces of Modena and Ferrara, San Giovanni in Persiceto is surrounded by the municipalities of Anzola dell'Emilia, Castelfranco Emilia, Castello d'Argile, Cento, Crevalcore, Sala Bolognese and Sant'Agata Bolognese.

== History ==
=== Middle Ages ===
The most ancestral records claim the town was first populated by Gauls, but later occupied by the Romans. The area appears to have been depopulated after the fall of the Western Roman Empire. The flooded plain remained uncultivated until the rule of the Exarchate of Ravenna, when lands were drained again. The Byzantines also built a defensive line in the territory against the Lombards, but c. 727, under King Liutprand, the Lombards overran the Castrum Persiceta. In the 728 Liutprand created the duchy of Persiceto. It is likely that the village formed as the traditional Borgo Rotondo (Round Village) under this new rule. With the fall of the Lombard Kingdom in 774 the early-medieval district of Persiceto (later San Giovanni in Persiceto), that stretched up to stream Samoggia, fell under the rule of the County of Modena, then the Abbey of Nonantola exercised its power on the territory, and since the 9th century it was handed over to the County of Bologna. Likely that around the half of that century the parish church of San Giovanni was built by the Bishops of Bologna.

Also in the 9th century, the Abbots of Nonantola (western side) and Bishops of Bologna (eastern side) gave out the first "ad meliorandum" grants of swampy and untilled land to the inhabitants of Persiceto; these lands would form the future Partecipanza agraria (Agricultural Attendance). After a brief autonomy (11–12th century), San Giovanni in Persiceto again came under political control of Bologna, till at the beginning of the 16th century, it ultimately subjected to the Papal rule.

In the 13th and 14th centuries, the 'castle' or 'land' of S. Giovanni in Persiceto was enlarged by a second circle of walls outside the Borgo Rotondo and by expanded settlements, surrounded, like the castle, by ditches, gates and palisades. However, because of the rebellion of the inhabitants of Persiceto, ever since the 1420s, the High Council of Bologna decreed that the external villages and its palisades had to be removed, the ditches filled up and all buildings that might be used as fortress had to be destroyed.

The ring villages were destroyed by 1481, under the rule of Giovanni II Bentivoglio; while over the years the castle expanded to its present shape with new bastions and embankments. At the end of the 15th century, the Bentivoglio using designs of Gaspare Nadi, built the present city hall, acquired by the Community in 1612. In the final years of Bentivoglio's rule, a canal to help drain the boggy lowlands of Sant'Agata Bolognese, Crevalcore and San Giovanni in Persiceto, was completed: this canal, the Cavamento, made large swaths of northern Persiceto tillable and habitable, so that by the 1470s, the new parish of San Matteo della Decima and its church were built. The inhabitants of Persiceto thankfully donated to Giovanni Bentivoglio a vast piece of land, on which later the mansion and castle of la Giovannina was built.

=== Modern age ===
Between the 15–16th century hemp culture and weaving expanded; and new crops such as mulberry, rice, and maize, were introduced. Landownership became more concentrated and sharecropping system consolidated, though the latter has been limited by the existence of Participants on a wide area. During the 16th century the Persiceto was overrun by foreign armies; the Agricultureal Attendance Institute Partecipanza was founded and a sharing of the common lands that took place every nine years was enhanced; the city centre underwent a process of impoverishment, whereas the weekly market on Wednesday kept flourishing thanks to old privileges. The local oligarchy of new families' faithful to the Church and subject to the Reggimento of Bologna and the Papal Legacy was established.

In the following two centuries, the castle interior underwent reconstruction; many broletti ('little kitchen-gardens') among the buildings disappeared in favour of new houses. Old medieval buildings were also destroyed, while some others were irreversibly modified. New churches and convents were built (among the other things, with the demolition of the old parish, a collegiate church was rebuilt there). The Ospedale del SS. Salvatore (now G. G. Croce Town Library and historical archive) was built on the grounds of the old fortress. The town theatre was built.

The incompetence of Papal governance impeded the development of the agriculture, whereas in other zones of the Po river valley advances in cultivation during half of the 18th century enhanced agricultural and economic progress. In Persiceto we can pinpoint samples of early rural industry: for centuries the inhabitants of Persiceto had cultivated hemp, not only for local production (together with cloth machining) for the weekly market, but also hemp which came from other places (such as Cento and Crevalcore) that was included in the trade. The surplus production of cloth was mostly exported to Venice.

=== French Revolutionary Wars ===
Persiceto was occupied by Revolutionary French troops in 1796, and the parishes of Persiceto and of Sant'Agata Bolognese were divided among into four cantons. The town of San Giovanni in Persiceto was briefly part of the Department of the Alta Padusa, with Cento as chief town (1797). Later it became the seat of the District of the Samoggia. Between 1798 and 1799 the community life was upset by plunderings, turmoils and seizures. In 1799, after the retreat of the French and of their allies of the Cisalpine republic, Persiceto was invaded by Russians and Austrians, who quickly restored the ancien régime. However, in 1800 the District of Samoggia was restored. With the establishment of the Italian Republic (1802) San Giovanni in Persiceto was again under the Deputy Prefecture established in Cento. In the first years of the Ottocento and at the establishment of the Kingdom of Italy (March 1805) calm came back into the territory of the Persiceto, but this was again overturned in 1814 by the fall of Napoleon until the Papal government was restored in July 1815.

Between 1796 and 1815, although the structures of the boards of direction and their denominations were changed, in Persiceto mostly the same families did the same civil service: they were clearly fit for adaptation. Within the same years the feudal privileges and the tithe were abolished, the pieces of land belonging to the Church were forfeited and the landed property was accumulated. The rice culture, with its following crisis of the sharecropping system, was expanded and so did even the agricultural day-labourers. With the restoration of the Papal rule remarkable works for the improvement of the "Castle" were started and in 1838 Pope Gregory XVI bestowed the title of city on San Giovanni. In 1857 Pius IX visited the town.

=== Persiceto after unification ===
Persiceto provided some volunteers in the wars of Independence even before the region was annexed to the Kingdom of Sardinia in 1860; but when the hated grist-tax was reintroduced by the national government, in San Giovanni in Persiceto, an insurrection of peasants developed on 7 January 1869). Meanwhile, some handicraft shops had become larger and were turned into factories that employed hundreds of workers: for instance, nail blacksmiths became big managers and started producing iron beds and furniture that were sold even abroad, so that San Giovanni in Persiceto merited the name of little Manchester of the Emilia. Over the last decades of the 19th Century public education was expanded, the traditional classical education was substituted by a technical school, the Società di mutuo soccorso (Company for mutual aid) among handicraft and factory workers was founded; during Carnival in 1874 the first fancy dress convoys were held, in 1876 the Società ginnastica Persicetana (Gymnastical Society of Persiceto); in 1877 the Cassa di Risparmio was opened to the public and ten years later the railway track between Bologna and Persiceto of the railroad Bologna/Verona was opened.

The past 150 years of Persiceto have seen pitched fights for land; the working classes shifted then from rebellion into organization: after the Comune of Paris (1871) in 1872 a new section of the Fascio operaio organized by the former Garibaldi soldier Teobaldo Buggini was established, a close friend of Andrea Costa; in 1873 the first strike by local factory workers was recorded; in 1874 internationalists of Persiceto tried to take part into the bakunian movement of Bologna; after the slump of the Anarchical International Movement the Società di sostentamento tra gli operai ('Workers' compensation society', the first local egalitarian socialist group) and in 1891 the Cooperativa braccianti that worked until the 1970s of the Novecento. In 1892 the 1st of May was celebrated for the first time with a private meeting. In 1893 the socialist section was founded. In 1896 an electoral committee to back up the socialist candidate to the Camera dei deputati (House of Representatives) was established. In 1898 the socialists regained the management of the Cooperativa braccianti by now run by liberals. At the beginning of the 20th century, the first resistance unions of blue collars and farmers were founded; the foundation of the Cooperativa operai metallurgici ('Metalworkers' cooperative') traces back to 1904 and it could escape the hostile interferences of the fascist regime. In the 1980s it reached high productivity and trading levels (the mark COM is known all around the world). The modern political parties that developed their propaganda even with the help of many famous local papers turned out to be particularly lively and quarrelsome. In 1904 in the borough of San Giovanni in Persiceto for the first time a socialist representative was elected (Giacomo Ferri). In the same year the first Casa del Popolo was inaugurated. In 1907 even the ruling of the Comune was handed over to the Socialists (as an anticlerical inspiration it was named, from 1912 to 1927, Persiceto).

After World War I land disputes again recurred, during which the massacre of Decima by public forces (5 April 1920) was carried out; in the political and social challenges particularly the fascists resorted to force against the socialists and their institution: many people of Persiceto had to leave the country because of their antifascist resentments or had to undergo jail or confinement.

=== World War II and after ===
During World War II, especially during the 20 months of the German occupation, resistance against the Nazis and the fascists developed in Persiceto and local partisans in the 63rd Garibaldi brigade sabotaged the transit of Nazi-fascist trucks and cars along the main road Bologna Verona Brennerpass, the passage of train convoys on the railway, electric lines and phone lines. The partisan forces underwent heavy losses after the mopping-up operations in Amola (5 December 1944), in Borgata Città (7 December) and in many other opportunities. At the end of the war, the night of 20 April 1945, partisan brigades took control of warehouses and factories to prevent their destruction by German troops in retreat, whereas the Allied troops entered the town the following night. After liberation, the inhabitants of Persiceto took part with commitment and interest in the political and social fights. In the elections, the left-wing parties (the communist and the socialist), prevailed and ruled together the municipality until 1980; the country fights record again force acts; heavy ideologies have riven the town. After the 1950s San Giovanni in Persiceto, a centre of agricultural production known for its markets (when in the Foro Boario thousands of cattle were gathered), underwent deep transformation from a mainly agricultural economy to an industrial and trading economy. The countryside was depopulated and the city expanded, which became the place of many high school addresses; after some decades of oblivion, the city library was born again; an important intermunicipal centre of sport plants and an extremely modern astronomical observatory were founded thereafter.

Nowadays, just 10 kilometres (6.2 mi) away from the Northern suburbs of Bologna, San Giovanni in Persiceto is part of the economic hub of the capital city of Emilia-Romagna, linked to Bologna by frequent train journeys.

== Main sights ==
- Civico Orto Botanico "Ulisse Aldrovandi", a botanical garden
- Astronomical Observatory and Planetarium
- The American English School

== Notable people ==
- Marco Belinelli (born 1986), basketball player with the San Antonio Spurs (NBA);
- Alberto Bergamini (1871–1962), director of Il Giornale d'Italia and liberal senator;
- Raffaele Pettazzoni (1883–1959), historian of religions and academic;

== Trivia ==
- In Sturmtruppen, a famous Italian comic strip written by Bonvi, San Giovanni in Persiceto is the birthplace of one of the main characters, the Fiero Alleaten Galeazzo Musolesi.
- On 7 July 1969, the town of San Giovanni in Persiceto was chosen by the first section of the criminal court in Palermo where forced to send to the stay for four years, Salvatore Totò Riina. In the same year Riina started the hiding, before reaching the place of confinement.
- Main-belt minor planet 69245 Persiceto is named after the town.
