= Mordano =

- Comune
- Comune di Mordano
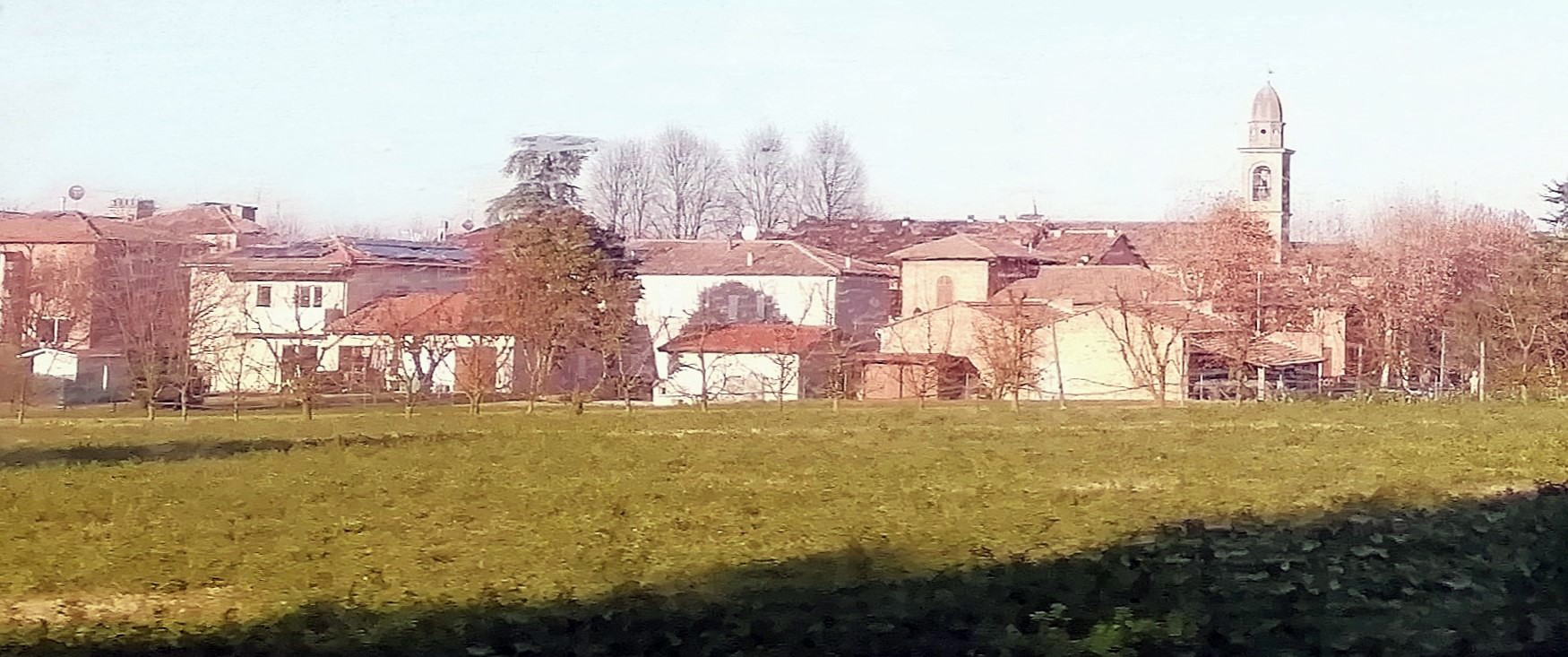

- Location within Italy Location within Emilia-Romagna
- Coordinates: 44°24′N 11°49′E
- Country: Italy
- Region: Emilia-Romagna
- Metropolitan city: Bologna (BO)
- Frazioni: Bubano

Government
  - Mayor: Stefano Golini (Partito Democratico) since 8 June 2009

Area
  - Total: 21 km^{2} (8.1 sq mi)
- Elevation: 21 m (69 ft)

Population (31 May 2007)
  - Total: 4,402
  - Density: 210/km^{2} (540/sq mi)
- Demonym: Mordanesi
- Time zone: UTC+1 (CET)
  - Summer (DST): UTC+2 (CEST)
- Postal code: 40027
- Dialing code: 0542
- Website: Official website

Mordano (Romagnol: Murdè or Murdèn) is a town and comune in Emilia Romagna (Italy), situated in the province of Bologna. The municipality is organized in two major villages: Mordano and Bubano.

== History ==
An intense activity of centuriation was performed by the Romans in the area and this is still visible nowadays: the streets of the countryside are organized in a squared lattice, every square has a side of about 715 meters (0.444 miles).

Reclaim of land is attested during the 11th and 12th centuries, creating the massa Bibani: a little village (Bubanus) grew around this new partition of cultivable land. Later, a castle was built up in this location.

The presence of a castle in Mordano is attested during the 15th century.

Both castles were then annexed in the domain of Caterina Sforza in 1488. In 1494, king Charles VIII of France destroyed the castle of Mordano, but it was unable to conquer the one of Bubano, bolstered by Caterina Sforza and transformed into a strong fortress.

During the following centuries, Mordano and Bubano were part of the domain of the Church and the two municipalities were joined. During this period, also the castle of Bubano was gradually demolished and nowadays only the main tower (known as Torrione Sforzesco) still exists.

In 1860 the municipality of Mordano became part of the newborn kingdom of Italy.

== Events ==
Around the year, several public events occur in the municipality of Mordano

- Sagra dell'Agricoltura (Agriculture celebration), since 1981. Mordano, last week of May.
- Palio del Torrione (Palio of the defensive tower), since 1997. Bubano, third week of June.
- Rock a Tutta Birra (Beer festival), since 1994. Chiavica, first week of September.

== Twin towns – sister cities ==
Mordano is twinned with:

- Mezőhegyes, Hungary, since 1990
