= Molinella =

- Comune
- Comune di Molinella
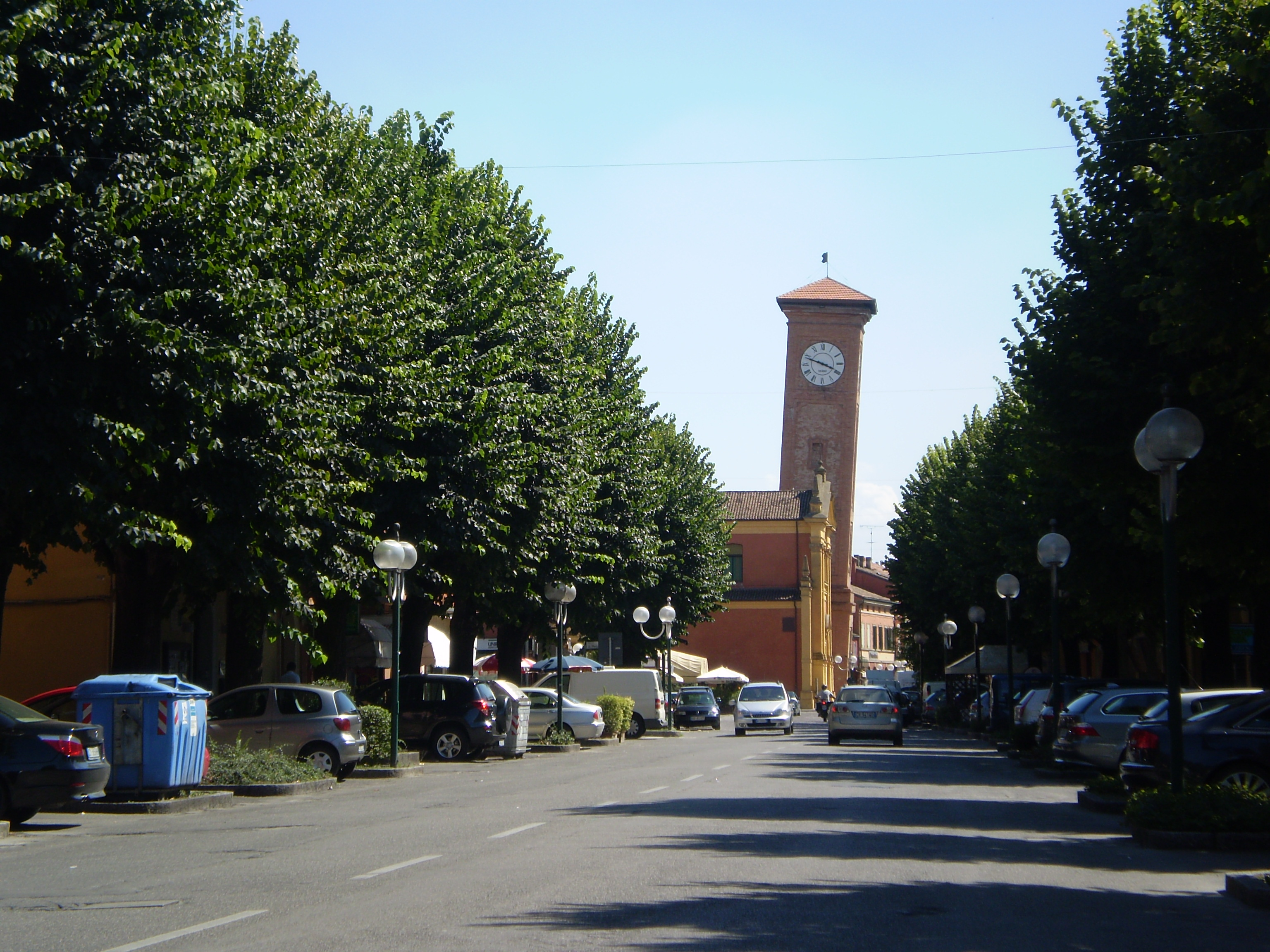

- Location within Italy Location within Emilia-Romagna
- Coordinates: 44°37′N 11°40′E
- Country: Italy
- Region: Emilia-Romagna
- Metropolitan city: Bologna (BO)
- Frazioni: Marmorta, San Martino in Argine, San Pietro Capofiume, Selva Malvezzi

Government
  - Mayor: Bruno Bernardi (since 2024)

Area
  - Total: 127.84 km^{2} (49.36 sq mi)
- Elevation: 8 m (26 ft)

Population (31 March 2018)
  - Total: 15,607
  - Density: 122.08/km^{2} (316.19/sq mi)
- Demonym: Molinellesi
- Time zone: UTC+1 (CET)
  - Summer (DST): UTC+2 (CEST)
- Postal code: 40062
- Dialing code: 051
- Patron saint: St. Matthew
- Saint day: September 25.
- Website: Official website

Molinella (Bolognese: Mulinèla or La Mulinèla) is a comune (municipality) part of Metropolitan City of Bologna in the Italian region Emilia-Romagna, located about 30 kilometres (19 mi) northeast of Bologna.

Molinella borders the following municipalities: Argenta, Baricella, Budrio, Medicina.

Molinella is situated in a rural area on the old San Donato Road (which in the past connected Bologna with Argenta and its port on the Po di Primaro). The municipality is crossed on the northern side by the Reno River and it is surrounded by several marshes and canals.

The town has a railway station on the Bologna-Portomaggiore Railway.

== History ==
The name Molinella comes from the Italian word for mill, molino; That is because during the Middle Ages there were a large number of watermills in this area.

The village was created before the 14th century on a hillock between the marshes of Marmorta and Marrara just south of the Po di Primaro river. The village was a "Customs place" on the border between the provinces of Bologna and Ferrara until the 18th century. It was also one of the few access points to the ferries which crossed the Po di Primaro.

It remained for long time one of the most isolated villages in the province of Bologna. The construction of the railway in the 19th century was the first step for the development of the village, which is nowadays a little town with high standards of living.

== Climate ==
On 12 January 1985, the official weather station of San Pietro Capofiume recorded the absolute low temperature of Italy for a lowland place: −28.8 °C (−19.8 °F).
