= Pieve di Cento =

- Comune
- Comune di Pieve di Cento
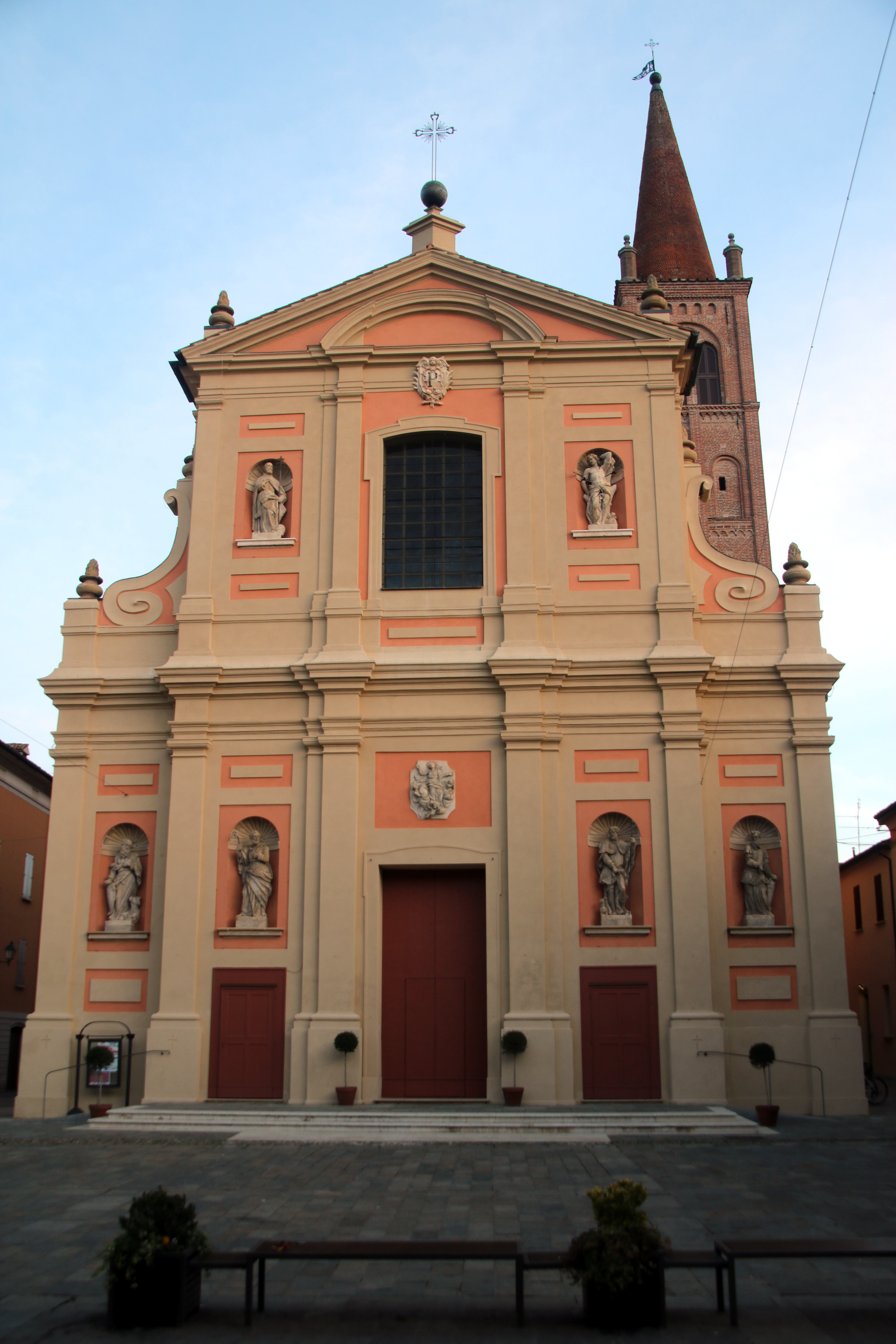
- Saint Mary's Church

- Coat of arms

- Location of Pieve di Cento in Italy Pieve di Cento (Emilia-Romagna)
- Coordinates: 44°43′N 11°19′E
- Country: Italy
- Region: Emilia-Romagna
- Metropolitan city: Bologna (BO)

Government
  - Mayor: Luca Borsari (PD)

Area
  - Total: 15.94 km^{2} (6.15 sq mi)
- Elevation: 18 m (59 ft)

Population (31 March 2018)
  - Total: 7,075
  - Density: 443.9/km^{2} (1,150/sq mi)
- Demonym: Pievesi
- Time zone: UTC+1 (CET)
  - Summer (DST): UTC+2 (CEST)
- Postal code: 40066
- Dialing code: 051
- ISTAT code: 37048
- Patron saint: St. Joseph
- Saint day: 19 March
- Website: Official website

Pieve di Cento (Bolognese: Pîv ed Zänt; "parish of Cento") is a comune (municipality) in the Metropolitan City of Bologna in the Italian region Emilia-Romagna, located about 25 kilometres (16 mi) north of Bologna.

== History ==
The origins of the town date back to the upper medieval period, whereby a town was established around the local church, which had the title of "Pieve". In fact, Pieve di Cento had the only church with a baptistery in its rural area, still known as Centopievese, until 1378. This meant that all the other churches nearby were under its jurisdiction. The Pieve is the current Collegiate Church of Santa Maria Maggiore, which received its title in the Middle Ages and retained the title even with the closure of its Chapter ordered by the Council of Trent.

In 1376, by a decree of the then Bishop of Bologna Bernardo de Bonneville, who was also a native of the area, the "Pieve" became known as Pieve Di Cento. This was also to be distinguished from the neighbouring town of Cento, which was given its right to build a baptistery in 1378 in its main church, the Collegiate Church of San Biagio.

In 1502, the town passed from the control of Bologna to the rule of the Este house in Ferrara, at the extinction of which, in 1598, it became part of the Papal States, where it remained until the Unification of Italy, save for a short occupation by France during the Napoleonic Wars, which saw the suppression of many religious institutions and the expropriation of one-third of the artistic patrimony, which was taken to France.

Upon the formation of the Kingdom of Italy, it was aggregated to the Province of Ferrara, where it remained until 1929, when it was aggregated to the Province of Bologna.

== Transportation ==
Pieve di Cento can be reached by the following local buses, operated by TPER:

- 97C Bologna-Castel Maggiore-San Giorgio di Piano-Castello d'Argile-Pieve di Cento-Cento
- 435 Pieve di Cento-Cento-Castello d'Argile-Argelato-San Giorgio di Piano-Bentivoglio Ospedale (reservation is required one day before the date of intended travel)
- 450 Cento-Pieve di Cento-Bologna (direct)
- 453 San Giorgio di Piano-Venazzano-Pieve di Cento-Cento
- 455 Cento-Pieve di Cento-San Pietro in Casale
- 456 Cento-Pieve di Cento-Poggetto-San Pietro in Casale

The town used to be linked by a tramway to Bologna between 1889 and 1955 when such infrastructure was replaced by buses by an executive order of the Province of Bologna. The tramway transported local workers from the countryside to the factories in Bologna, alongside freight transportation of locally grown beetroots, which could then be sold to local factories or exported to the rest of Italy.

== Seismic damages ==
Madonnina in the severely damaged Church of St Mary Major

Two major earthquakes struck the region of Emilia-Romagna in 2012, killing more than twenty people and leaving thousands homeless. The first tremor struck early in the morning of 20 May; two further serious aftershocks struck several hours later, and again nine days later, causing widespread damage, particularly to buildings already weakened by earlier seismic forces.

In Pieve di Cento, the shaking collapsed the cupola of the Church of Santa Maria Maggiore, showering debris into the nave and threatening 17th-century masterpieces by Guercino, Guido Reni and Lavinia Fontana, and exposing them to the elements.

Cardinal Ravasi, president of the Pontifical Council for Culture and responsible for conserving the cultural patrimony of the Holy See, visited the area to draw attention to the plight of the survivors and tweeted his prayer message accompanied by a striking photo of the serene intact faces of the Madonnina di Pieve di Cento a weakened plaster-cast effigy of the child Jesus in his mother's arms.
