= Castel di Casio =

- Comune
- Comune di Castel di Casio
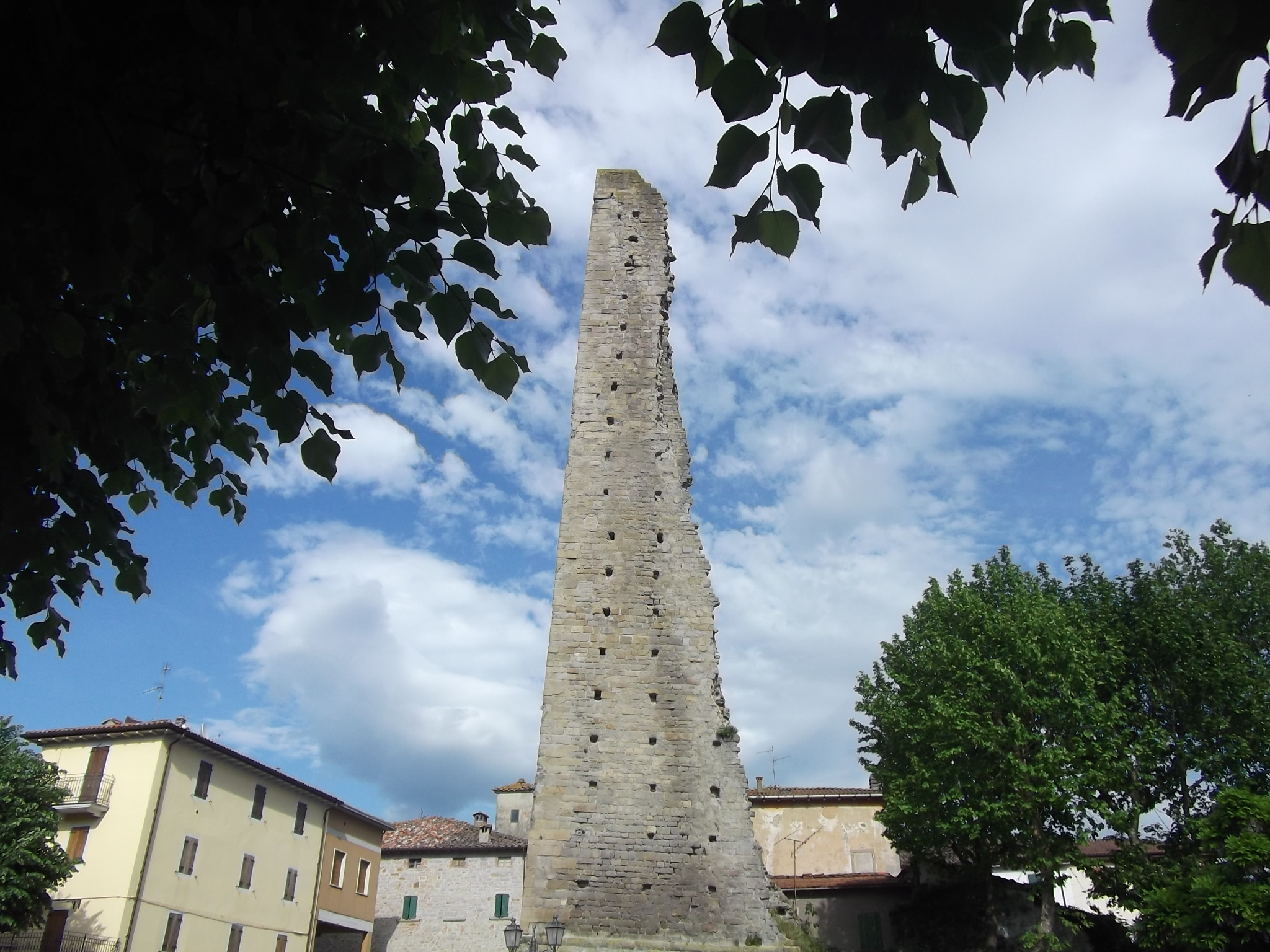
- Remains of the local medieval tower.

- Location within Italy Location within Emilia-Romagna
- Coordinates: 44°10′N 11°2′E
- Country: Italy
- Region: Emilia-Romagna
- Metropolitan city: Bologna (BO)
- Frazioni: Suviana

Government
  - Mayor: Mauro Brunetti

Area
  - Total: 47.33 km^{2} (18.27 sq mi)
- Elevation: 533 m (1,749 ft)

Population (31 May 2017)
  - Total: 3,427
  - Density: 72.41/km^{2} (187.5/sq mi)
- Demonym: Castellani
- Time zone: UTC+1 (CET)
  - Summer (DST): UTC+2 (CEST)
- Postal code: 40030
- Dialing code: 0534
- Patron saint: St. Blaise
- Saint day: 3 Febbraio
- Website: Official website

Castel di Casio (Medial Mountain Bolognese: Castèl or Castèl d Chèsi) is a comune (municipality) of the Metropolitan City of Bologna in the Italian region Emilia-Romagna, about 60 kilometres (37 mi) southwest of Bologna.

Castel di Casio borders the following municipalities: Camugnano, Gaggio Montano, Grizzana Morandi, Alto Reno Terme, Sambuca Pistoiese.
