= Castel Guelfo di Bologna =

- Comune
- Comune di Castel Guelfo di Bologna
- Flag Coat of arms

- Location within Italy Location within Emilia-Romagna
- Coordinates: 44°26′N 11°41′E
- Country: Italy
- Region: Emilia-Romagna
- Metropolitan city: Bologna (BO)
- Frazioni: Poggio Piccolo, Via Larga

Government
  - Mayor: Cristina Carpeggiani

Area
  - Total: 28.6 km^{2} (11.0 sq mi)
- Elevation: 32 m (105 ft)

Population (31 December 2014)
  - Total: 4,489
  - Density: 157/km^{2} (407/sq mi)
- Demonym: Guelfesi
- Time zone: UTC+1 (CET)
  - Summer (DST): UTC+2 (CEST)
- Postal code: 40023
- Dialing code: 0542
- Website: Official website

Castel Guelfo di Bologna (Eastern Bolognese: Castèl Guêlf or Castelghèif) is a comune (municipality) in the Metropolitan City of Bologna in the Italian region Emilia-Romagna, located about 30 kilometres (19 mi) southeast of Bologna.

Castel Guelfo di Bologna borders the following municipalities: Castel San Pietro Terme, Dozza, Imola, Medicina.
