= Baricella =

- Comune
- Comune di Baricella
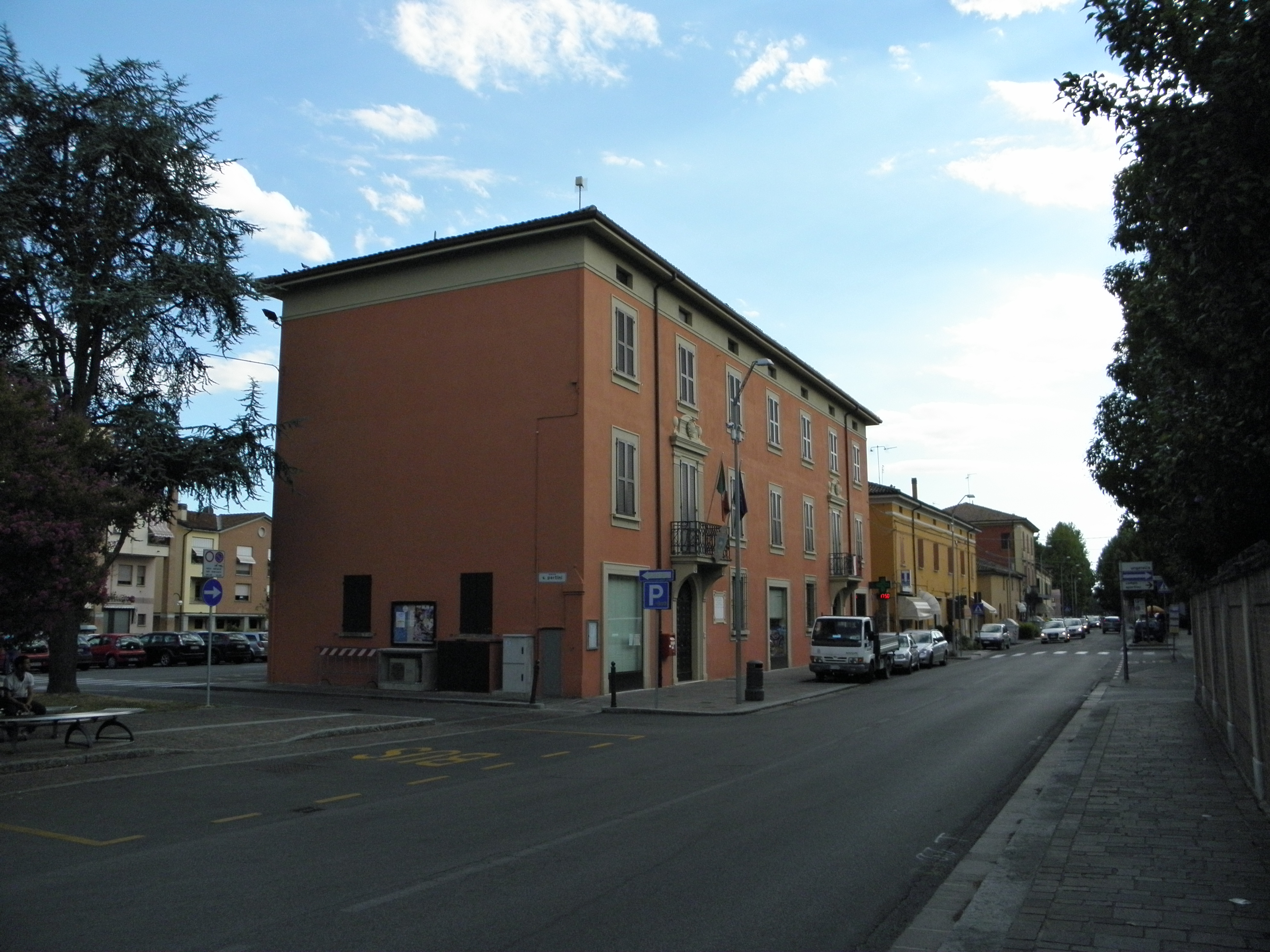
- The town hall

- Location within Italy Location within Emilia-Romagna
- Coordinates: 44°39′N 11°32′E
- Country: Italy
- Region: Emilia-Romagna
- Metropolitan city: Bologna (BO)
- Frazioni: San Gabriele, Mondonuovo, Gandazzolo, Passo Segni

Government
  - Mayor: Andrea Bottazzi

Area
  - Total: 45.48 km^{2} (17.56 sq mi)
- Elevation: 11 m (36 ft)

Population (28 February 2017)
  - Total: 6,980
  - Density: 153/km^{2} (397/sq mi)
- Demonym: Baricellesi
- Time zone: UTC+1 (CET)
  - Summer (DST): UTC+2 (CEST)
- Postal code: 40052
- Dialing code: 051
- Patron saint: Birth of Mary
- Saint day: 8 September
- Website: Official website

Baricella (Bolognese: Bariṡèla, locally La Barisèla) is a comune (municipality) in the Metropolitan City of Bologna in the Italian region Emilia-Romagna, located about 28 kilometres (17 mi) northeast of Bologna.

Baricella borders the following municipalities: Argenta, Budrio, Ferrara, Malalbergo, Minerbio, Molinella, Poggio Renatico.
