= Grizzana Morandi =

- Comune
- Comune di Grizzana Morandi
- Location within Italy Location within Emilia-Romagna
- Coordinates: 44°15′N 11°9′E
- Country: Italy
- Region: Emilia-Romagna
- Metropolitan city: Bologna (BO)

Government
  - Mayor: Graziella Leoni

Area
  - Total: 77.4 km^{2} (29.9 sq mi)
- Elevation: 547 m (1,795 ft)

Population (31 August 2017)
  - Total: 3,890
  - Density: 50.3/km^{2} (130/sq mi)
- Demonym: Grizzanesi
- Time zone: UTC+1 (CET)
  - Summer (DST): UTC+2 (CEST)
- Postal code: 40030
- Dialing code: 051
- Website: Official website

Grizzana Morandi (Medial Mountain Bolognese: Grizèna) is a comune (municipality) in the Metropolitan City of Bologna in the Italian region Emilia-Romagna, located about 30 kilometres (19 mi) southwest of Bologna. The town is summer holiday resort, located in the mountains between the valleys of the rivers Reno and Setta.

Originally simply Grizzana, it received the "Morandi" in 1985, as an honorarium to the Italian painter Giorgio Morandi, who died in 1964. Morandi rarely travelled from his home and studio in Bologna, but visited Grizzana every year from 1913 for a summer holiday period, and many of his landscape paintings are of the town and its immediate surrounds. The town also hosts a centre for documentation about him (Centro di documentazione Giorgio Morandi) which has a collection of documents on the painter and local history.

Grizzana Morandi borders the following municipalities: Camugnano, Castel di Casio, Castiglione dei Pepoli, Gaggio Montano, Marzabotto, Monzuno, San Benedetto Val di Sambro, Vergato.
