= Loiano =

- Comune
- Comune di Loiano
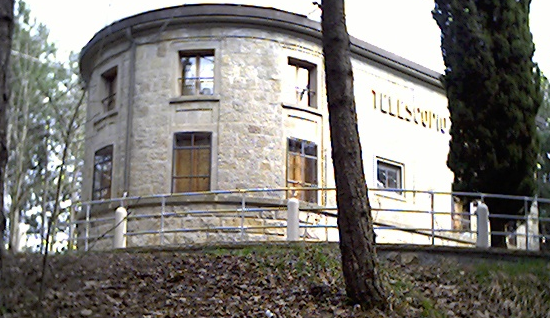
- Loiano Astronomical Observatory.

- Location within Italy Location within Emilia-Romagna
- Coordinates: 44°16′N 11°19′E
- Country: Italy
- Region: Emilia-Romagna
- Metropolitan city: Bologna (BO)
- Frazioni: Anconella, Barbarolo, Bibulano, La Guarda, Quinzano, Roncastaldo, Sabbioni, Scanello, Scascoli

Government
  - Mayor: Fabrizio Morganti

Area
  - Total: 52.41 km^{2} (20.24 sq mi)
- Elevation: 714 m (2,343 ft)

Population (31 December 2019)
  - Total: 4,376
  - Density: 83.50/km^{2} (216.3/sq mi)
- Demonym: Loianesi
- Time zone: UTC+1 (CET)
  - Summer (DST): UTC+2 (CEST)
- Postal code: 40050
- Dialing code: 051
- Website: Official website

Loiano (Medial Mountain Bolognese: Lujèn [luˈjɛŋ]; City Bolognese: Lujàn) is a town and comune of Metropolitan City of Bologna in the Emilia-Romagna region of Italy in the Tusco-Emilian Apennines at 714 metres (2,343 ft) above sea level. Highway SS 65 connects it to Bologna, 35 kilometres (22 mi) to the north, and Florence, 73 kilometres (45 mi) to the south.

It is the site of an observatory affiliated with the Observatory of Bologna at the University of Bologna, named after the astronomer Giovanni Domenico Cassini.

At Val Sicura, within the territory of the commune, a shooting range founded in 1889 remains active.
