= Argelato =

- Comune
- Comune di Argelato
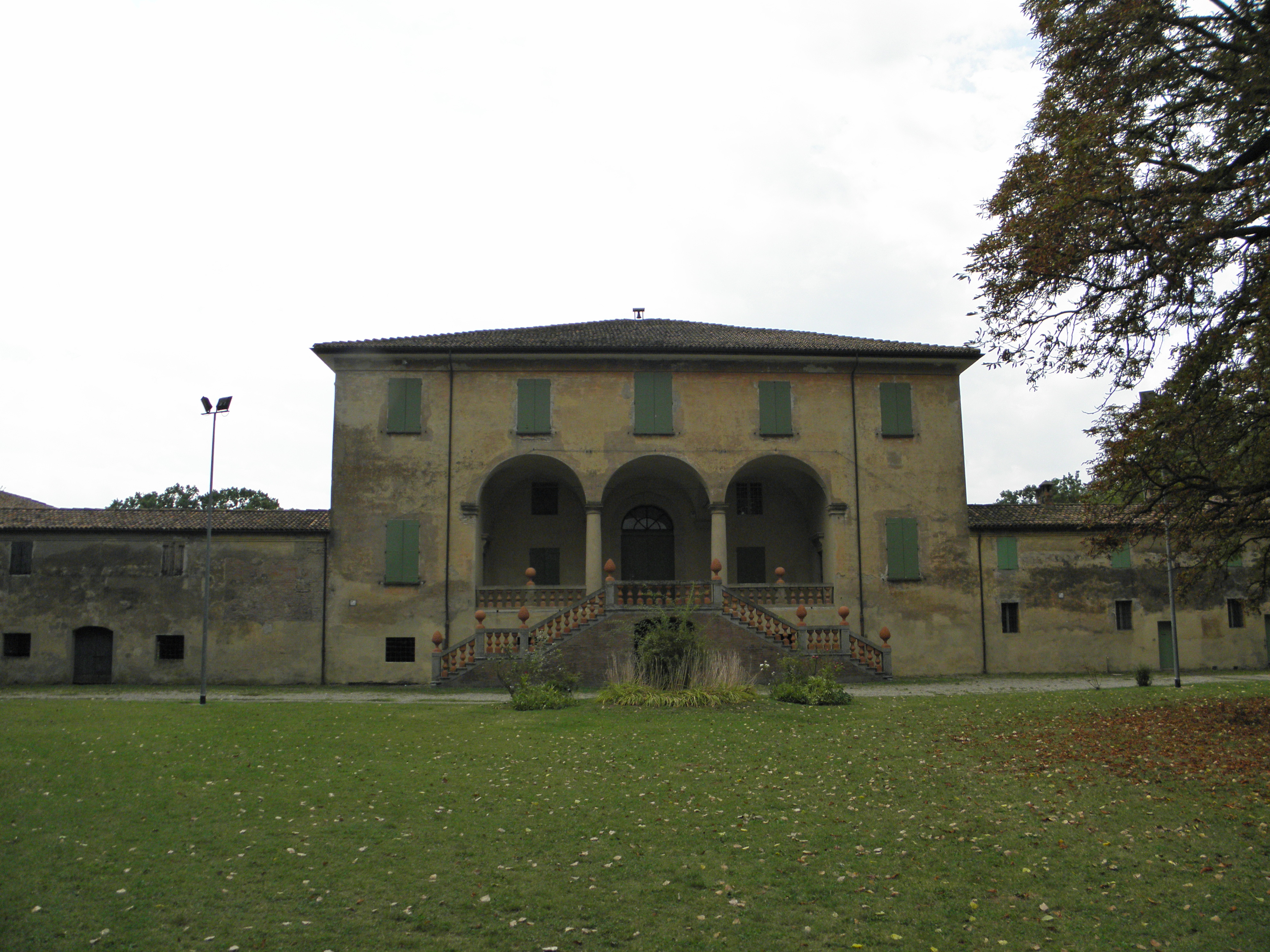
- Villa Beatrice.

- Flag Coat of arms

- Location of Argelato in Italy Argelato (Emilia-Romagna)
- Coordinates: 44°34′33″N 11°20′55″E
- Country: Italy
- Region: Emilia-Romagna
- Metropolitan city: Bologna (BO)
- Frazioni: Casadio, Funo, Malacappa, Passo Gatti, San Donnino, San Giacomo, Volta Reno

Government
  - Mayor: Claudia Muzic

Area
  - Total: 35 km^{2} (14 sq mi)
- Elevation: 25 m (82 ft)

Population (30 April 2017)
  - Total: 9,823
  - Density: 280/km^{2} (730/sq mi)
- Demonym: Argelatesi
- Time zone: UTC+1 (CET)
  - Summer (DST): UTC+2 (CEST)
- Postal code: 40050
- Dialing code: 051
- Patron saint: St. Michael Archangel
- Saint day: 29 September
- Website: Official website

Argelato (Northern Bolognese: Arżlè) is an Italian comune in the Metropolitan City of Bologna. It comprises the hamlets of Argelato, Casadio, Casette di Funo, Funo, Malacappa, Volta Reno, San Donnino and San Giacomo, that are administratively divided into the main town (comprising also the hamlet of Casette di Funo) and the hamlets Casadio (comprising the village of Malacappa) and Funo (comprising the village of Casette di Funo).

In the hamlet of Funo are a large railway station for good deliveries, industrial facilities (Guaber) and one of the largest gross sale centre in Europe (CenterGross - center for gross trade of Bologna), the second biggest in Italy after the CIS of Nola.
