= San Pietro in Casale =

- Comune
- Comune di San Pietro in Casale
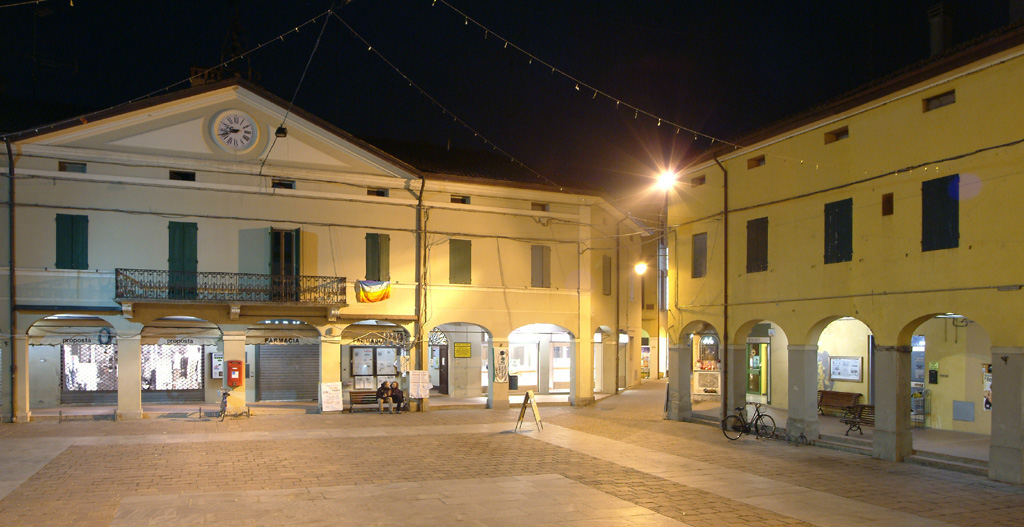

- Location within Italy Location within Emilia-Romagna
- Coordinates: 44°42′N 11°24′E
- Country: Italy
- Region: Emilia-Romagna
- Metropolitan city: Bologna (BO)
- Frazioni: Asia, Cenacchio, Gavaseto, Maccaretolo, Massumatico, Poggetto, Rubizzano, Sant'Alberto, San Benedetto

Government
  - Mayor: Alessandro Poluzzi

Area
  - Total: 65.86 km^{2} (25.43 sq mi)
- Elevation: 17 m (56 ft)

Population (30 November 2016)
  - Total: 12,293
  - Density: 186.7/km^{2} (483.4/sq mi)
- Demonym: Sanpierini
- Time zone: UTC+1 (CET)
  - Summer (DST): UTC+2 (CEST)
- Postal code: 40018
- Dialing code: 051
- Patron saint: Sts. Peter and Paul
- Saint day: June 29
- Website: Official website

San Pietro in Casale (Bolognese: San Pîr in Casèl) is a municipality in the Metropolitan City of Bologna, in Emilia-Romagna, Italy.

It is situated 24 kilometres (15 mi) north from Bologna, and 24 kilometres (15 mi) southwest from Ferrara. San Pietro is on the main rail line from Bologna to Padua and Venice.

The name San Pietro in Casale appeared the first time in 1223.

== Twin cities ==
- Benešov, Czech Republic
