= Zola Predosa =

Municipality of the metropolitan city of bologna

- Comune
- Comune di Zola Predosa
- Location within Italy Location within Emilia-Romagna
- Coordinates: 44°29′18″N 11°13′05″E
- Country: Italy
- Region: Emilia-Romagna
- Metropolitan city: Bologna (BO)
- Frazioni: Gessi, Gesso, Lavino, Madonna dei Prati di Tomba, Ponte Ronca, Riale, Rivabella, Tombe

Government
  - Mayor: Davide Dall’Omo

Area
  - Total: 37.75 km^{2} (14.58 sq mi)
- Elevation: 74 m (243 ft)

Population (31 December 2017)
  - Total: 18,939
  - Density: 501.7/km^{2} (1,299/sq mi)
- Demonym: Zolesi
- Time zone: UTC+1 (CET)
  - Summer (DST): UTC+2 (CEST)
- Postal code: 40069
- Dialing code: 051
- Patron saint: St. Nicholas
- Saint day: December 6
- Website: Official website

Zola Predosa (Bolognese: Zôla Predåusa) is a comune (municipality) in the Metropolitan City of Bologna in the Italian region Emilia-Romagna, located about 11 kilometres (7 mi) west of Bologna.

== Twin towns ==
Zola Predosa is twinned with:

- Timrå Municipality, Sweden

== Sport ==
The main football club of the municipality is the Axys Zola.
