= San Giorgio di Piano =

- Comune
- Comune di San Giorgio di Piano
- Coat of arms

- Location within Italy Location within Emilia-Romagna
- Coordinates: 44°39′N 11°23′E
- Country: Italy
- Region: Emilia-Romagna
- Metropolitan city: Bologna (BO)
- Frazioni: Cinquanta, Gherghenzano, Stiatico

Government
  - Mayor: Paolo Crescimbeni

Area
  - Total: 30 km^{2} (12 sq mi)
- Elevation: 21 m (69 ft)

Population (31 December 2014)
  - Total: 8,472
  - Density: 280/km^{2} (730/sq mi)
- Demonym: Sangiorgesi
- Time zone: UTC+1 (CET)
  - Summer (DST): UTC+2 (CEST)
- Postal code: 40016
- Dialing code: 051
- Patron saint: St. Luigi
- Saint day: 23 April
- Website: Official website

San Giorgio di Piano (Northern Bolognese: San Zôrz; "St. George of the Plain") is a comune located in the Metropolitan City of Bologna, in the Italian region of Emilia-Romagna. It is the birthplace of actress Giulietta Masina.
