= Sala Bolognese =

- Comune
- Comune di Sala Bolognese
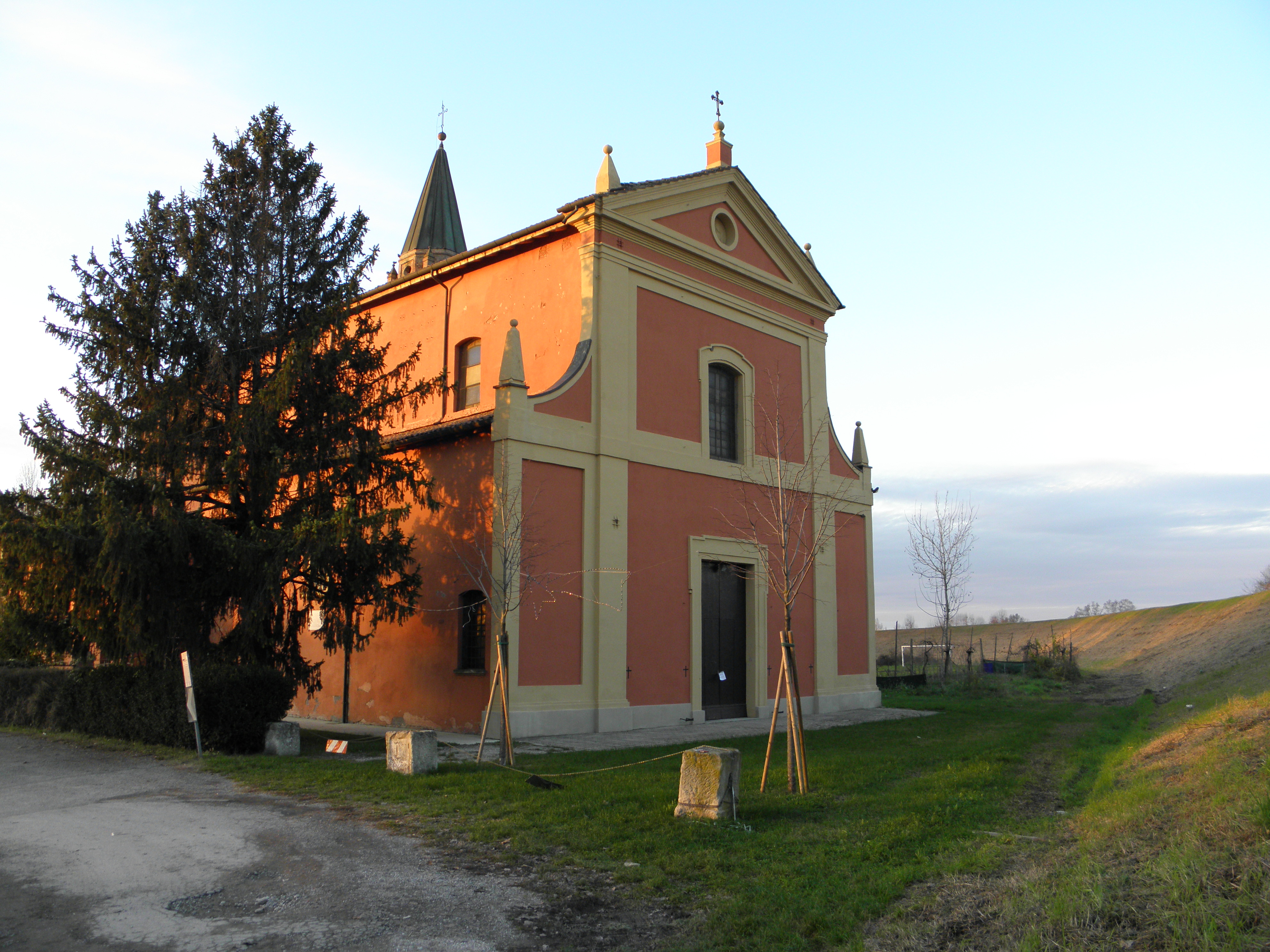
- Parish church of San Biagio in the frazione of Bonconvento.

- Location within Italy Location within Emilia-Romagna
- Coordinates: 44°37′N 11°15′E
- Country: Italy
- Region: Emilia-Romagna
- Metropolitan city: Bologna (BO)
- Frazioni: Bagno di Piano, Bonconvento, Osteria Nuova, Padulle, Sala

Government
  - Mayor: Valerio Toselli

Area
  - Total: 45.64 km^{2} (17.62 sq mi)
- Elevation: 25 m (82 ft)

Population (30 November 2016)
  - Total: 8,361
  - Density: 183.2/km^{2} (474.5/sq mi)
- Demonym: Salesi
- Time zone: UTC+1 (CET)
  - Summer (DST): UTC+2 (CEST)
- Postal code: 40010
- Dialing code: 051
- Patron saint: St. Blaise (Sala), St. Maria Assunta (Padulle), St. Michael (Bagno di Piano), St. Petronius (Osteria Nuova)
- Saint day: October 4
- Website: Official website

Sala Bolognese (Bolognese: Sèla Bulgnàisa) is a comune (municipality) in the Metropolitan City of Bologna in the Italian region Emilia-Romagna, located about 15 kilometres (9 mi) northwest of Bologna.

The municipality of Sala Bolognese is composed by the frazioni Padulle (housing the municipality seat), Sala, Osteria Nuova, Bonconvento and Bagno di Piano.

It is home of the Romanesque Pieve of Santa Maria Annunziata and San Biagio, at Sala, built in 1096.
