= Monghidoro =

Monghidoro Munghidôr / Schirgalèṡen (Emilian)
- Comune
- Comune di Monghidoro
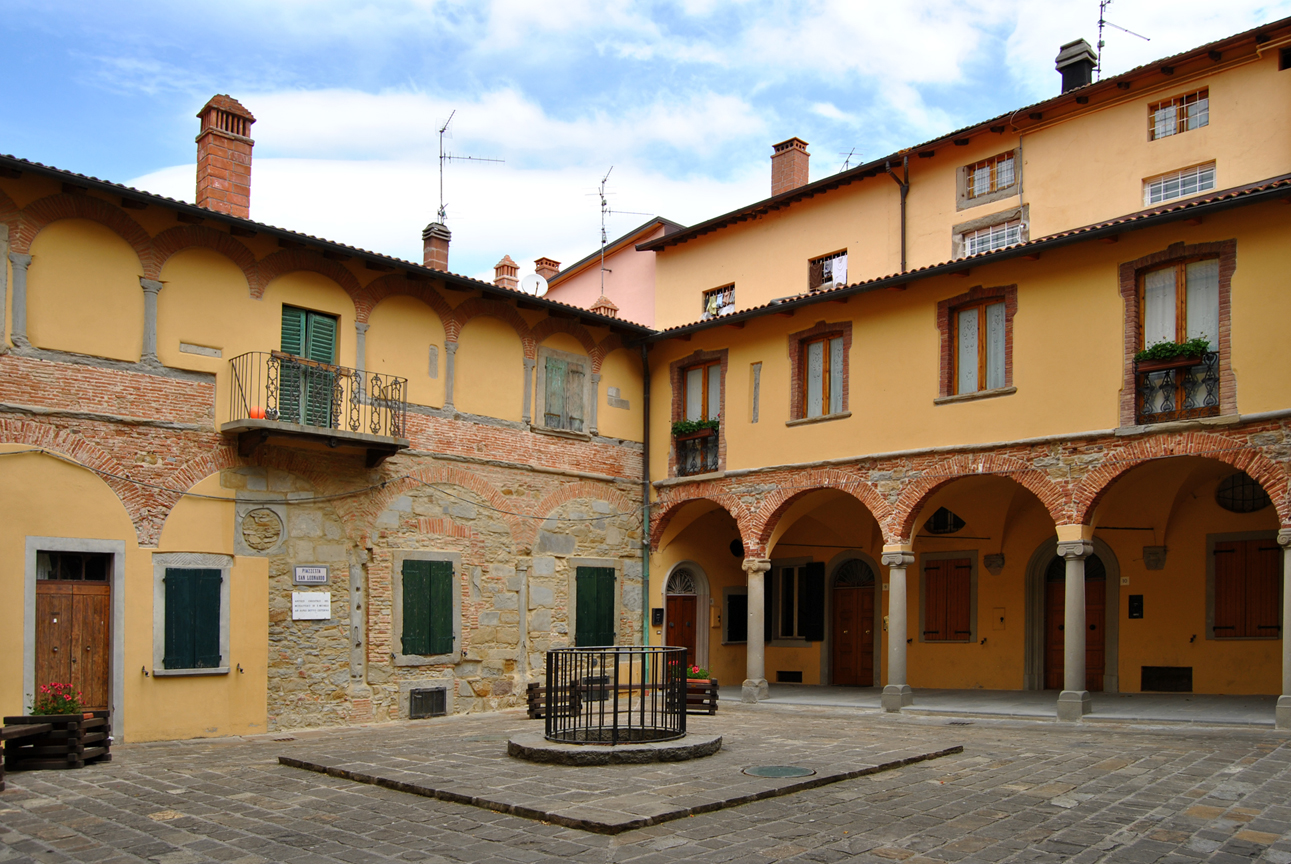
- Abbey of St Michael, Monghidoro

- Coat of arms

- Location within Italy Location within Emilia-Romagna
- Coordinates: 44°13′N 11°19′E
- Country: Italy
- Region: Emilia-Romagna
- Metropolitan city: Bologna (BO)
- Frazioni: see list

Government
  - Mayor: Barbara Panzacchi

Area
  - Total: 48.29 km^{2} (18.64 sq mi)
- Elevation: 841 m (2,759 ft)

Population (31 October 2017)
  - Total: 3,698
  - Density: 76.58/km^{2} (198.3/sq mi)
- Demonym: Monghidoresi
- Time zone: UTC+1 (CET)
  - Summer (DST): UTC+2 (CEST)
- Postal code: 40063
- Dialing code: 051
- Website: Official website

Monghidoro (Mid-Highland Bolognese: Munghidôr, also Schirgalèṡen; City Bolognese: Dscargalèṡen) is a comune (municipality) in the Metropolitan City of Bologna in the Italian region of Emilia-Romagna, located about 41 kilometres (25 mi) south of Bologna.

== Geography ==
The territory of Monghidoro borders the following municipalities: Firenzuola, Loiano, Monterenzio, Monzuno, San Benedetto Val di Sambro.

The town sits on a ridge of the Apennines, between two river valleys, Savena and Idice. The main road, joining Bologna to Florence, is the SP65. Traces of a Roman road, Flaminia minor, joining Florentia with Felsina can still be found at the top of Mount Oggioli, approximately 8 kilometres (5 mi) south of town.

The territory surrounding the municipality is, for the largest part, mountainous with elevations ranging between a minimum of 400 metres (1,300 ft) above sea level to the north-east to a maximum of 1,290 metres (4,230 ft) on its southern flank.

== History ==
Due to its geographical position Monghidoro, which the writer Giordano Berti has described as the "Crossroads of Europe", in the course of the centuries became a necessary passage between the Po Valley and Central Italy.

The name of Monghidoro is thought to be dating back to the times the Ostrogoths, Byzantines, Langobards, who were pillaging and looting at will up and down the Italian peninsula around the 8th, 9th century AD. It is believed that a Gothic settlement lasted long enough to give its name to the locality of Mons Gothorum ("Goths' Mountain"), but a folk etymology theory links the name to Mungi d'oro ("Golden Milking"), perhaps connected to the many green pastures that abound in the surrounding area.

The town, in its current form, originated in 1264 when the commune of Bologna created a vanguard here to counter the expansion of the Republic of Florence and in 1246, as a result of the complex politics of Italian city states of that period, the village was fortified to counter the continued border skirmishes and was given the nickname of Scaricalasino (in local Emilian Schirgalèṡen) which literally translates as "Unload the donkey"; this because the village sits at the top of a harsh ascent, which takes the traveller from 598 m to 841 m and it was indispensable to rest the beasts of burden following the climb.

In 1507 Monghidoro was annexed to the Papal States, following the fortunes of Bologna and its territories. The Olivetan Order of Benedictin monks (Olivetans) began building a monastery in the village centre in 1528. In 1796, with the arrival of Napoleon in Italy, the comune became part of the Cispadane Republic until 1815, when the Congress of Vienna decided to return the territory to Bologna and the Papal States. From about 1660 until the advent of large-scale rail transit in the 1840s, Monghidoro was a mandatory stop-over to rest horses and carriage drivers of the aristocratic and fashionably polite society of the European continent on the Grand Tour of Italy on their way to Florence and Rome. In 1860 Monghidoro was officially annexed to the Kingdom of Sardinia becoming Kingdom of Italy in 1861.

Towards the end of World War II Monghidoro found itself at the centre of the strategic Gothic Line hosting the very important 4th Parachute Division (Germany) command centre, part of the 14th Army (Wehrmacht). Following some bitter fighting and extensive damage, allied troops of the 362nd and 363rd Infantry Regiments of the 91st Infantry Division under the command of Major General William G. Livesay and overall command by 5th Army American General Mark Wayne Clark finally liberated the town in the afternoon of October 2, 1944. At the end of the conflict, the local economy, like most of Italy, laid in ruins and many local inhabitants emigrated to Belgium (notably Rebecq), Germany (Stuttgart and Calw), and France (Lyon), although throughout the early 20th century, following a national trend, the town witnessed a slow decline, with large numbers of Monghidoro's citizens either moving to larger cities or emigrating abroad looking for work or a better way of life. This reached an all-time low in 1978, when only 2,450 people remained in the whole of the comune (against the 6,000 of the previous century). It has recently grown back to some 3,800, due, mainly, to people returning to spend their retirement in their native surroundings, elderly people wanting a quieter way of life away from the hustle and bustle of city life or foreign immigrants looking for a cheaper alternative to living in the city.

== Main sights ==
=== Chiostro Della Cisterna ===
Chiostro Della Cisterna (or St Leonard's cloister) is the only remains of the Olivetans' monastery.

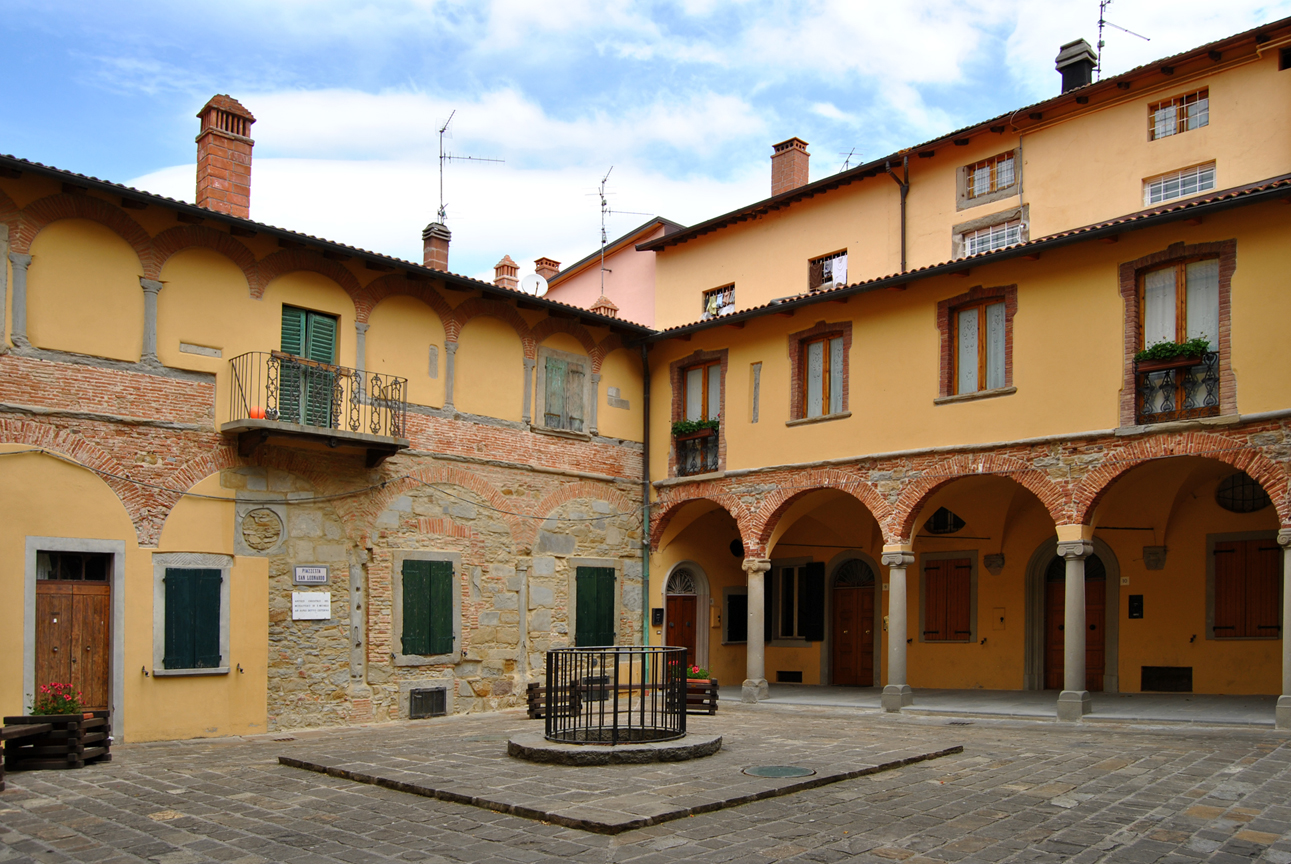
The cloister of St Michael monastery (1530), actually named St Leonard's Square

In 1528 work started to convert a mansion in the centre of the village, belonging to Armaciotto De’ Ramazzotti, a renowned Condottiero from Monghidoro, into a monastery for the use of the Olivetan Order of Benedictine monks (Olivetans) dedicated to S. Michele as Alpes; this was to become a very important religious, administrative, political and social centre in the area for almost three centuries and around which the town grew.

The cloister of the monastery is all that remains nowadays. Known by the locals as “cisterna”, because at the very centre of this complex the monks built a cistern to collect rain water, the ingenious monks used charcoal filters to make the water drinkable; a well was then used to collect the water. There are no indications of what happened to this and when it was dismantled. In 1806, a new church dedicated to S. Mary, was built on the old monastery wall. In 1869 the now old and unstable monastic tower was demolished and the construction of a bell tower began; in this same year town planners realized that the ancient monastic portico could be a hindrance to local traffic and decide to knock it down; it is at this time that every external clue as to the 16th century monastic façade disappears. Badly damaged by allied bombings during World War II, the bell tower was pulled down soon after the conflict ended; In 1996, thanks to a large extent from funds raised by public and private enterprise, a recovery plan of what remains of the historic centre of Monghidoro was initiated. These started from the area that belonged to the old monastery.

Nowadays the Cisterna is the cultural center of Monghidoro; during the summer months a wide range of artistic shows take place in this small piazza: musical/literature performances, theatrical plays, painting and cultural exhibitions.

=== Piazza Armaciotto De Ramazzotti ===
Named after the previously mentioned condottiero, this is the very heart of town and the main piazza, although peculiarly built in a rhomboid shape as a street/square. An old fountain adorned the centre, demolished in the mid-1920s to be replaced by a monument dedicated to the fallen soldiers of World War I, this too was removed in 1968 to make way for a new monument to honour the victims of all conflicts.

Also at this time the local government decided to plant trees to beautify the square; this had the effect of spoiling the area, as the charm of the piazza had disappeared beneath the foliage. In the 1990s, during the recovery plan, the trees were removed, the walls of the old church highlighted as well as the two narrow gaps at either end delimiting the piazza; new street lights were replaced with lanterns to give a turn of the century feel to the town.

=== Church of the Assumption of the Blessed Virgin Mary ===
The church, dedicated to the Virgin Mary, Patron Saint of Monghidoro, was built in 1951 from a drawing of architect Vignali; it was designed to replace the smaller chapel in the Cisterna complex deemed too small to accommodate the town needs. A bell tower was added in 1991. The bell tower has an octagonal base and, to match the style of the church, was constructed using local sandstone. Inside the church, the visitor can enjoy the Sacred Art exposition in the hall dedicated to Don Bosco; the 1685 painting by Giovanni Antonio Burrini (1656–1727) depicting the Holy Mary between Saint Petronius and Saint Denis has pride of place.

== Natural areas ==
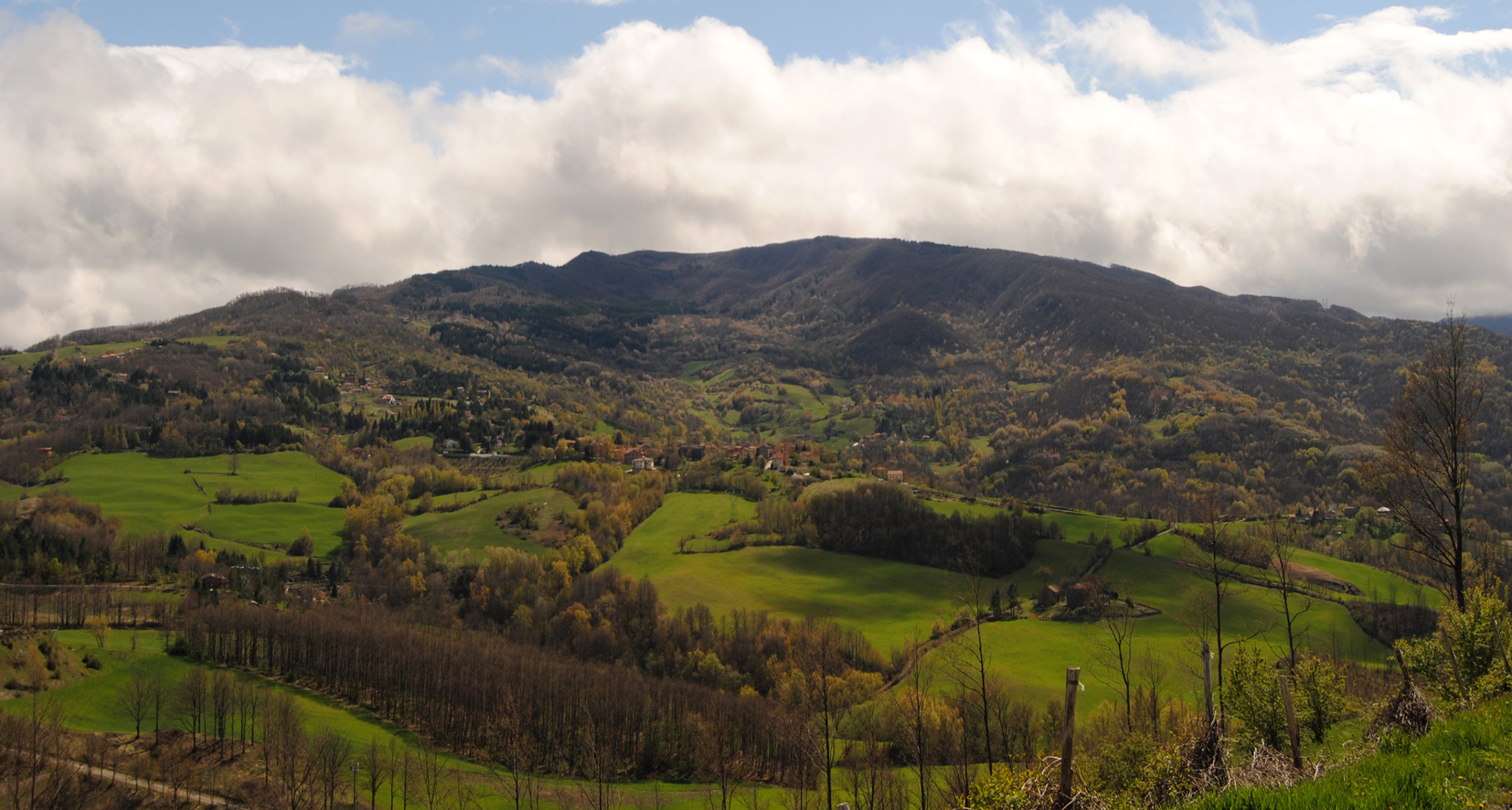
The Alpe of Monghidoro in Springtime.

=== The Alpe ===
It is a mountain range, 850 to 1,290 metres (2,790 to 4,230 ft) above sea level, that overlooks Monghidoro to its north and lies on the border with Tuscany. The summit is reachable by car through dirt roads or on foot following marked trails where, on clear days, a scenic panorama, ranging from the Adriatic to the east and the Alps to the north, can be enjoyed. The area boasts a wide variety of wild life such as deer, roe deer, wild boar, fox, hare, badger and lately wolf. Strolling on the slopes of this area the visitor can also observe a wide variedy of birds, including: jays, great tit, woodpeckers, hawks and owls. A short distance from the mount summit is a small amusement park, Triton's Adventures Park, equipped with a picnic area. Atop the mountain there are traces of a Roman road and a ruin dating to the 1600s known as Osteria del Fantorno. The tale tells that the latter was set on fire and destroyed by the local population when a patron found a human finger in his plate. This naturally gave rise to numerous legends. Other popular myths allege that the mountain is home to supernatural creatures; the local dialect has various names to describe these: spìrit (ghost or fairy), barabén or barabanén (similar to pixie or brownie), mazapécc (similar to dwarf), sèltapécc (similar to goblin or elf).

=== La Martina Park ===
The park, 430 to 770 metres (1,410 to 2,530 ft) above sea level, was created by the Province of Bologna in 1972 in the Idice river valley and it measures approximately 155 hectares (380 acres); it boasts a wide variety of wild life such as deer, wild boar, foxes and badgers. The park is an authentic natural oasis; woods have been reforested predominantly with indigenous plants such as conifers, hardwood and oaks. For anyone wishing to gain a deeper knowledge of the many natural aspects of the Apennine, a didactical path has been predisposed allowing the visitor to observe the many species of the important diversity of plants in a woodland garden. For those visitors wishing to stay, a fully equipped campsite is provided. Inside the park are the remains of an ancient copper mine dating to the 17th century.

== Economy ==
A number of mills used to provide an important source of income to the local area: an activity which lasted well into the 1950s was connected to the natural resources afforded by the proximity of the two rivers. Not many mills survive to this day; very few have been carefully restored to a workable condition, allowing a suggestive insight into a bygone way of life, but, as this is often the case, the vast majority were converted to residential homes and little was done to protect and preserve any resemblance or character of their former "life"; only one still exists in workable condition, Mulino di Mazzone and it is to be found near Piamaggio.

Today's local economy is largely based on commerce with tourism being common in the summer months; this is augmented by the very scenic SP65 thoroughfare, between Bologna and Florence, which attracts many foreign visitors on their tour through Italy. Once a year the historic Mille Miglia car-race re-enactment still runs through the town on its last day of the rally between Florence, Futa Pass and Raticosa pass, Bologna, Modena and all the way back to Brescia. There are some small industrial activities, mainly of an artisan nature (carpenters, builders, blacksmiths). Agriculture is present, although, due to the nature of the territory, this is a minor occupation; cattle, sheep grazing and raising of livestock are also present. A large proportion of the workforce commutes daily to areas where industry is prevalent.

== Cuisine ==
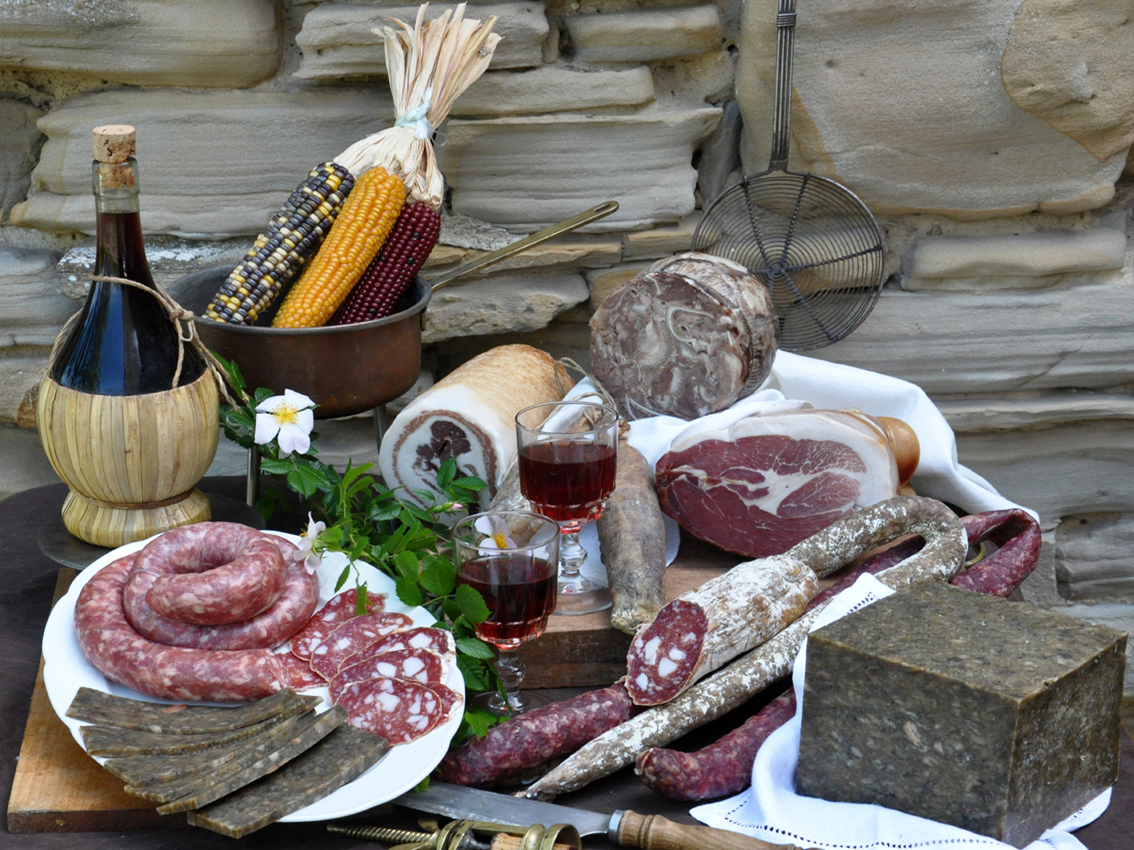
Traditional Monghidoro fare

Local produce ranges from salt-cured meat (prosciutto, salami, pancetta, capicola, lucanica sausage etc.) and cheeses, home-made pasta, such as tortellini, tortelloni, lasagne, tagliatelle, local truffles, wild mushrooms and sweet chestnuts, etc. The influence of Tuscany is also strongly felt, with game being prevalent in the autumn months as well as the Fiorentina steak, pappardelle, and other pasta dishes.

Local wine is almost always Tuscan table red or Albana from the Imola area.

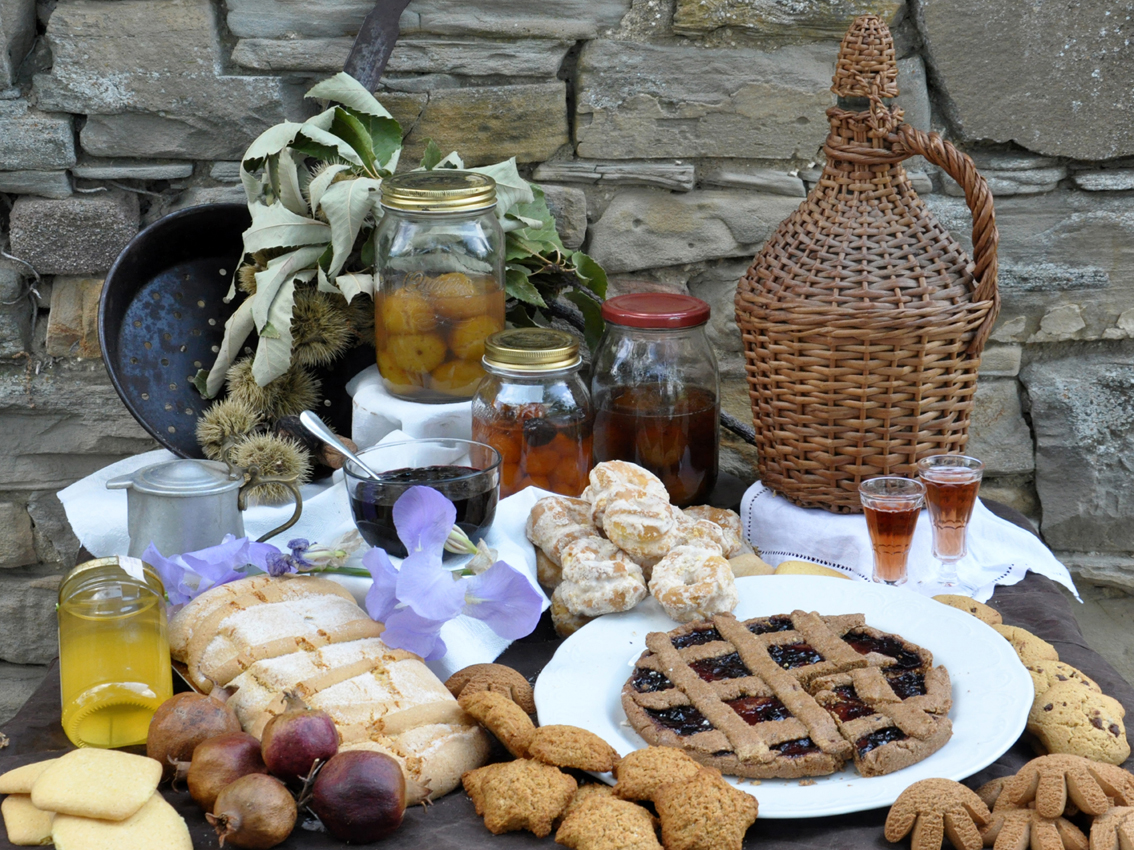
Traditional cakes, biscuits and other sweet fare.

Monghidoro is also renowned for its cakes; these are traditionally made with either wheat or chestnut flour then usually filled with fruits of the wood, jams and preserves, in the crostata style as well as apples, pears, figs, prunes, wholenuts, hazelnuts and pinenuts.

== Subdivisions ==
The frazioni of Monghidoro are Ca' dei Brescandoli, Ca' del Costa, Ca' di Fiore, Ca' di Francia, Ca' del Gappa, Ca' dei Marchi, Ca' di Pallerino, Campeggio, Ceragne, Frassineta, La Ca', La Costa, La Fossa, La Lastra, La Martina, La Piazza, Lamazze di Qua, Madonna dei Boschi, Malalbergo, Molino della Pergola, Pallerano, Pergoloso, Piamaggio, Pian dei Grilli, Sant'Andrea di Savena, Sumbilla, Vasellara Bassa, Vergiano, Villa di Mezzo

== People ==
- Gianni Morandi (b. 1944), singer and actor

== Twin towns ==
- Rebecq, Belgium, since 2002
