= Silarus =

Silarus was the Latin name of two Italian rivers:

- Silarus (Sele), today the Sele in Campania
- Silarus (Sillaro), today the Sillaro, in Emilia-Romagna
