= Monterenzio =

- Comune
- Comune di Monterenzio
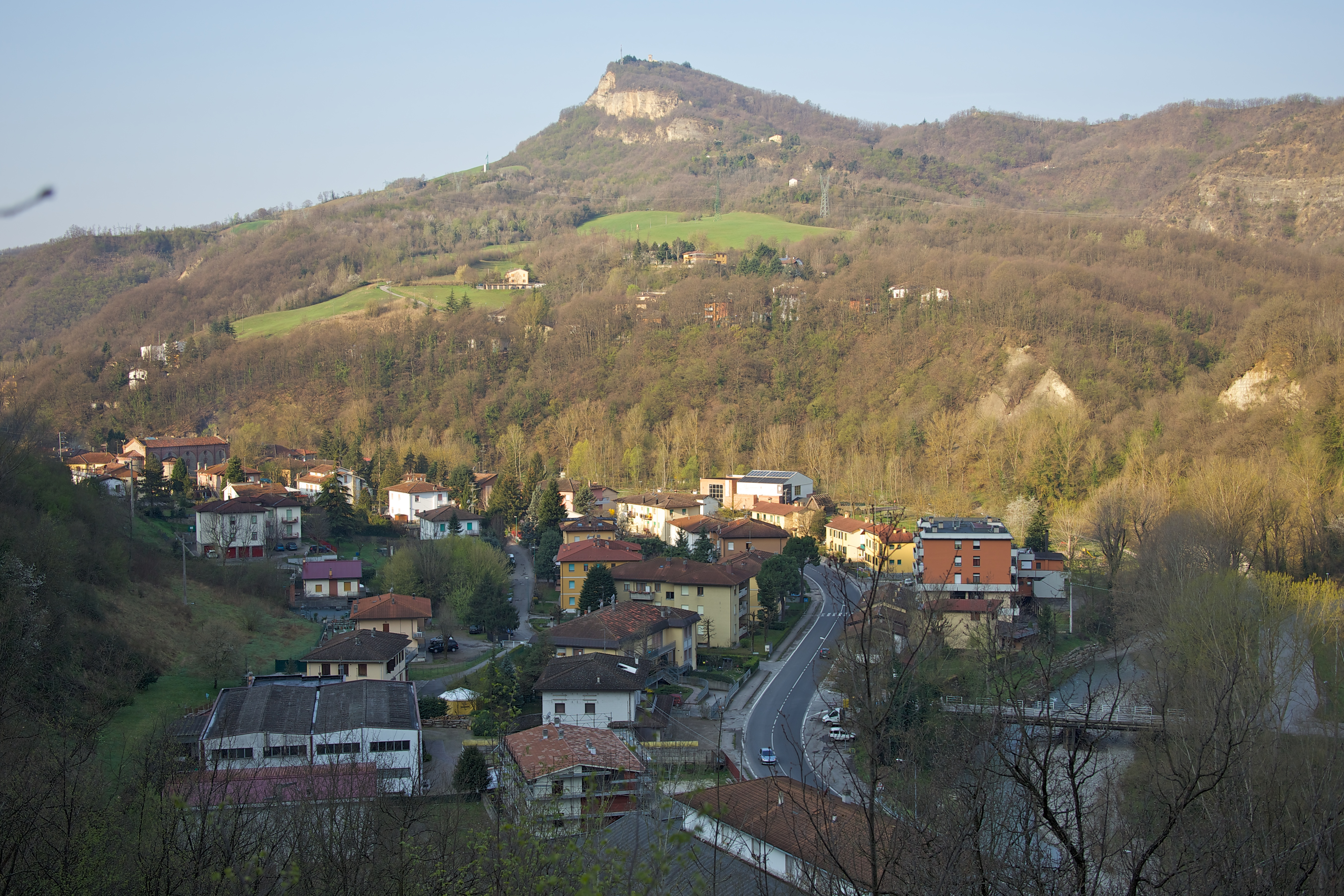
- View of Monterenzio

- Coat of arms

- Location within Italy Location within Emilia-Romagna
- Coordinates: 44°19′40″N 11°24′20″E
- Country: Italy
- Region: Emilia-Romagna
- Metropolitan city: Bologna (BO)
- Frazioni: Bisano, Cà di Bazzone, Cassano, Castelnuovo, Farneto, Pizzano, Rignano, San Benedetto del Querceto, San Clemente, Sassuno, Savazza, Vignale, Villa di Sassonero, Farneto, Cà del Vento, Villa di Cassano, Bisano, Cà Merla, Cà Corradini, Fiumetto

Government
  - Mayor: Davide Lelli

Area
  - Total: 105 km^{2} (41 sq mi)
- Elevation: 207 m (679 ft)

Population (30 November 2017)
  - Total: 6,081
  - Density: 57.9/km^{2} (150/sq mi)
- Demonym: Monterenziesi
- Time zone: UTC+1 (CET)
  - Summer (DST): UTC+2 (CEST)
- Postal code: 40050
- Dialing code: 051
- Website: Official website

Monterenzio (Medial Mountain Bolognese: Muntarènzi) is a town and comune in the Metropolitan City of Bologna (Emilia-Romagna, Italy).

== Geography ==
The territory of the municipality rises on the ridge between the valleys of the Idice and Sillaro streams. The eleven rural units that make up the territory date back to the Pre-Napoleonic era. The Via Flaminia Minore road runs upon the crest and marks the watershed and the historic and cultural border between Emilia and Romagna.

The main town is located at about 34 kilometres (21 mi) from Bologna, on the right side of the Idice and downstream of the community of Monterenzio that gave the name to the comune. In the past the town hall was located in Villa di Cassano and Ca' di Lavacchio, afterwards in Fiumetto, in 1880 and then from 1934 onwards in today's collocation.

== History ==
Monterenzio might be identified in Monte Russi, mentioned for the first time in a decree from Emperor Otto III of 998 CE; a castrum (castle) or of Monte Renzoli was mentioned in a transaction of 1034. The first settlements date back to the Villanovian era, as some findings near Pizzano witness. An Etruscan-Celtic settlement was discovered in the hamlet of Pianella di Monte Savino, nowadays still an object of excavations, dating back to the 4th century BCE that brought to light the presence of a tank for the gathering of water, certainly of public domain. The settlement reached its peak in the 3rd century BCE, whereas it should be followed by a swift period of decline due to the presence of Romans on the territory. A large necropolis has been found on top of Monte Tamburrino.

== Main sights ==
The Rocca Malaspina ("Malaspina Castle"), resembling to a house-tower. The façade has three staggered portails and concave windows bordered by a cylindric cordon.

The hamlet of Scaruglio is home to the Church of Sant'Andrea di Scoveto, mentioned many times in the tithe reports of 1300, near which the market of Monterenzio was said to have taken place, as prescribed in the Statutes of Bologna in 1288. Of historical interest are also Villa di Cassano, and, on the Mount of Castellaccio, a castle mentioned in 1297, when it was fortified by Bologna.

The hamlet has also some interesting buildings of the 14th or 15th century.

== Twin towns ==
- Glux-En-Glenne, France
