= Savena =

River in Italy

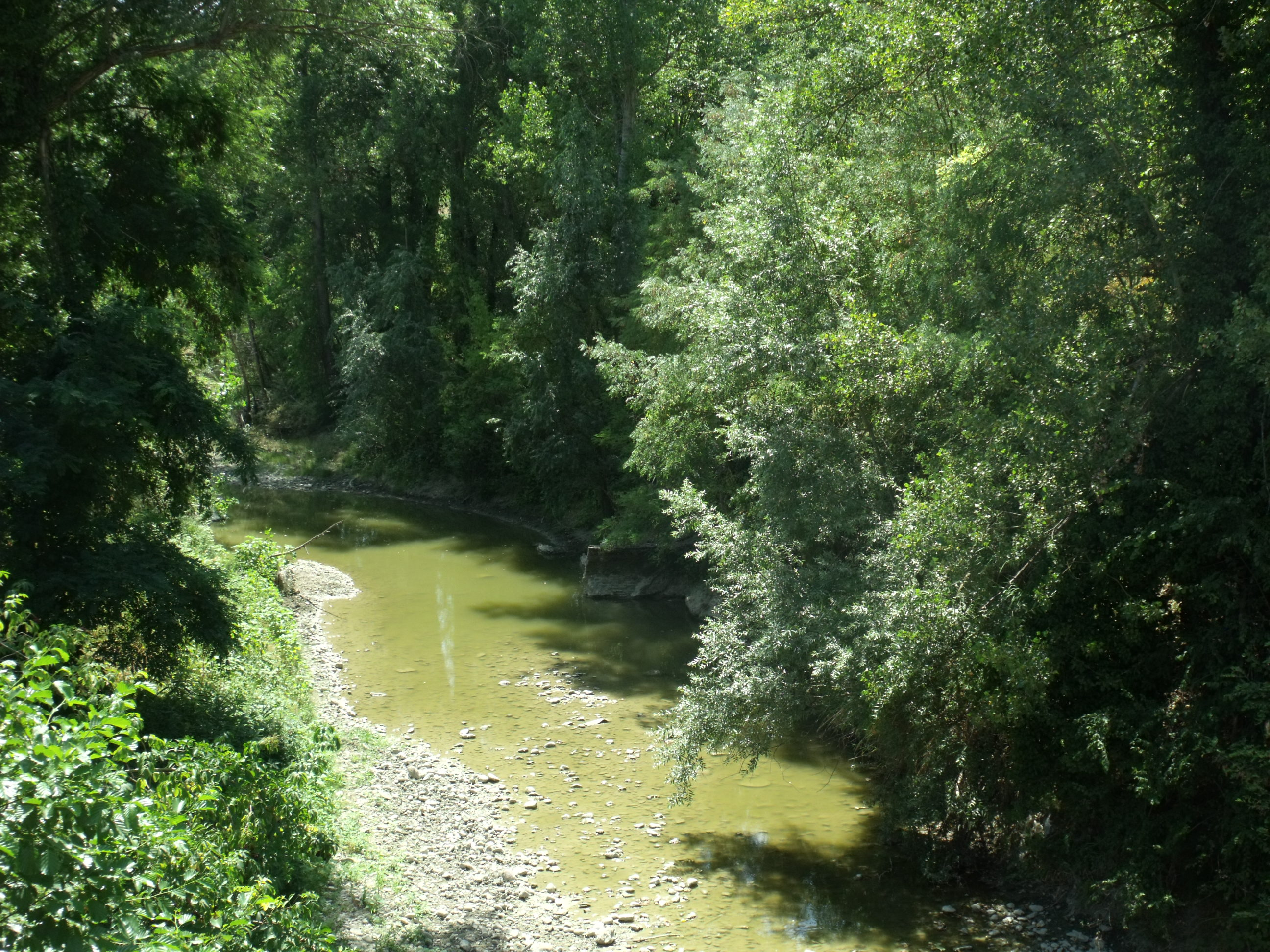
- The Savena River near Ponticella
- Native name: Sèvna (Emilian)

Location
- Country: Italy

Physical characteristics
- Source
  - location: near Firenzuola
  - elevation: 1,000 m (3,300 ft)
- Mouth: Idice
  - coordinates: 44.4859°N 11.4430°E
- Length: 55 km (34 mi)
- Basin size: 170 km^{2} (66 sq mi)
- Discharge
  - average: 5 m^{3}/s (180 cu ft/s)

Basin features
- Progression: Idice→ Reno→ Adriatic Sea

The Savena (Italian: [ˈsaːvena]; Bolognese: Sèvna [ˈsɛvnɐ]) is a river in the Tuscany and Emilia-Romagna regions of Italy. The source of the river is in the province of Florence west of Firenzuola in the Appennino Tosco-Emiliano mountains. The river flows north into the province of Bologna, and flows near Monghidoro, Loiano, Pianoro and San Lazzaro di Savena before curving east and flowing into the Idice east of Bologna.
