= Idice =

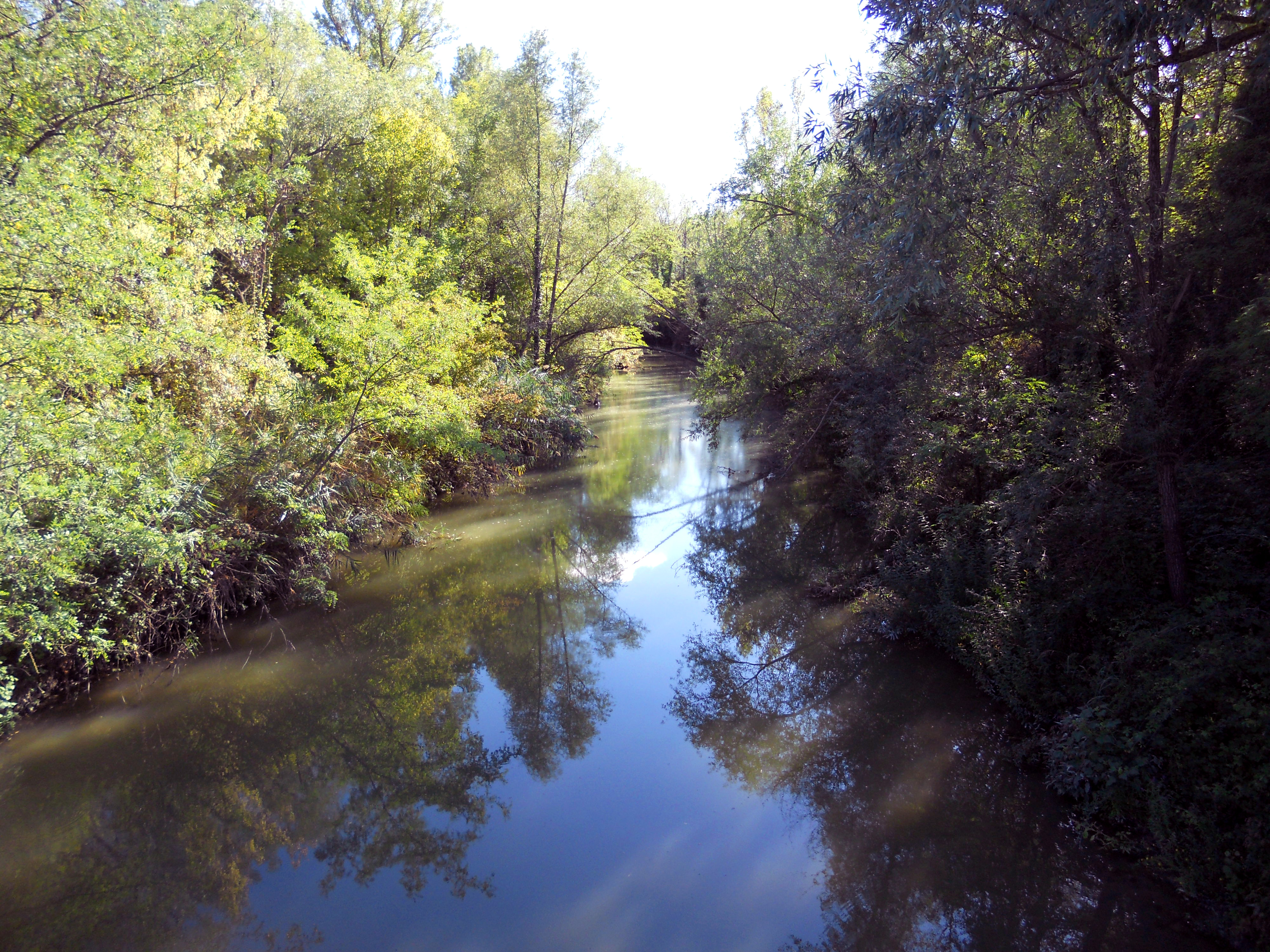

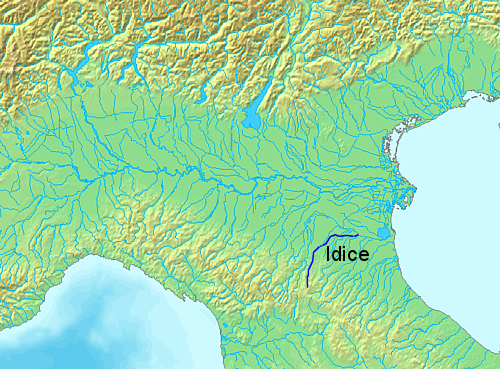
- Etymology: from Latin Idex
- Native name: Éǵǵ (Emilian)

Location
- Country: Italy

Physical characteristics
- Source
  - location: near Monghidoro
  - elevation: 950 m (3,120 ft)
- Mouth: Reno
  - coordinates: 44.5787°N 11.8724°E
- Length: 78 km (48 mi)
- Basin size: 800 km^{2} (310 sq mi)
- Discharge
  - average: 12 m^{3}/s (420 cu ft/s)

Basin features
- Progression: Reno→ Adriatic Sea
- Tributaries
  - left: Savena

The Idice (Italian: [ˈiːditʃe]; Bolognese: Éǵǵ [ˈedːz]) is a river in the Tuscany and Emilia-Romagna regions of Italy. The source of the river is in the province of Florence near Monghidoro in the Appennino Tosco-Emiliano mountains. The river flows north into the province of Bologna near Monterenzio before being joined by the Savena east of Bologna. The river then curves eastward and flows near Castenaso and Budrio before flowing into the province of Ferrara. It then flows into the Reno near where the Sillaro enters the Reno southeast of Argenta.
