= Reno (river) =

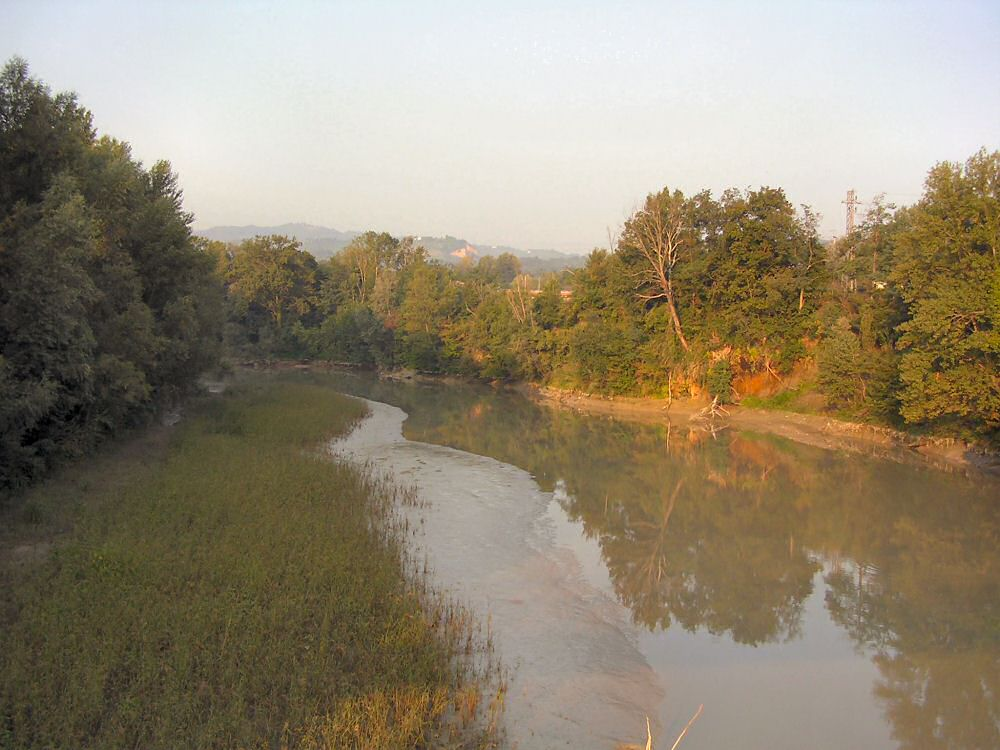
- The river near Sasso Marconi, at the beginning of its course in the Pianura Padana

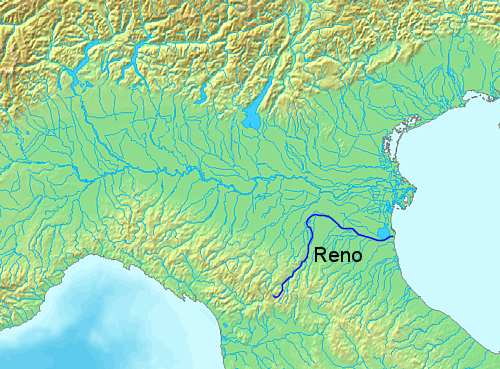
- Location of the Reno River in Italy
- Etymology: from Proto-Celtic *Rēnos, 'raging flow'
- Native name: Raggn; Ränn (Emilian)

Location
- Country: Italy

Physical characteristics
- Source
  - location: Tuscan Apennines, Italy
- Mouth: Adriatic Sea
  - coordinates: 44°35′27″N 12°16′48″E
- Length: 211.8 km (131.6 mi)
- Basin size: 4,628 km^{2} (1,787 mi^{2})
- Discharge
  - average: 95 m^{3}/s (3,400 cu ft/s)

The Reno (Italian: [ˈrɛːno]; Emilian: Raggn [ˈrɐɲː] or Ränn [ˈræŋː]) is a river of Emilia-Romagna and Tuscany, northern Italy. At 211 km (131 mi), it is the tenth longest river in Italy (the sixth longest of those that flow directly into the sea) and the most important of the region apart from the Po.

It has a drainage basin of 4,628 square kilometres (1,787 mi^{2}). The annual average discharge at the mouth is about 95 cubic metres per second (3,400 cu ft/s); at the point where the river flows into the Pianura Padana (Po River Plain), it amounts to about 25 cubic metres per second (880 cu ft/s). The highest values registered at its outflow into the Po Plain have approached 2,300 cubic metres per second (81,000 cu ft/s), but the typical value when the river is in flood is around 1,000 cubic metres per second (35,000 cu ft/s). The minimal discharge reported is 0.6 cubic metres per second (21 cu ft/s).

== Name ==
The name of the river has the same etymology as the name of the Rhine, as both derive from the same Celtic hydronym Rēnos, the Reno basin being situated within Gallia Cisalpina, in what was the territory of the Boii before the Roman conquest of 220 BC. In Italian both rivers are called Reno, and in Latin both were called Rhenus. In 43 BC the pact establishing the Second Triumvirate was signed on an islet of the river near Bononia (Bologna). The river is mentioned by Dante Alighieri in Canto XVIII of his Inferno where he defines the Bolognesi as those "living between the Savena and the Reno".

The Reno gave its name to a department of the Cispadane Republic (1796–1797), the Cisalpine Republic (1797–1802), the Italian Republic (1802–1805) and the Kingdom of Italy (1805–1814).

== Geography ==
The river rises at the north side of the Apennine Mountains at about 1,010 m (3,310 ft) above sea level near the village Prunetta in the province of Pistoia (Tuscany). Its upper course marks the border between Tuscany and Emilia-Romagna and it flows through a forested area crossed by the Pistoia–Bologna railway. Its upper valley is part of the Natura 2000 protected area Tre Limentre - Reno. The upper basin is characterized by several reservoirs which are used for hydro-electric energy production. The power produced in the basin of the Reno basin is second, for Apennine rivers, only to that of the Nera-Velino in Umbria.

At Casalecchio di Reno, west of Bologna, it leaves the mountains and enters the Po Plain. The Reno was a tributary of the Po near Ferrara until the second half of the 18th century when its course was diverted to lessen the risk of devastating floods. It now joins the Adriatic Sea near Casal Borsetti, south-east of the Valli di Comacchio.

The most important tributaries include the Limentra orientale, Silla, Setta, Samoggia, Idice, Sillaro, Santerno and Senio.

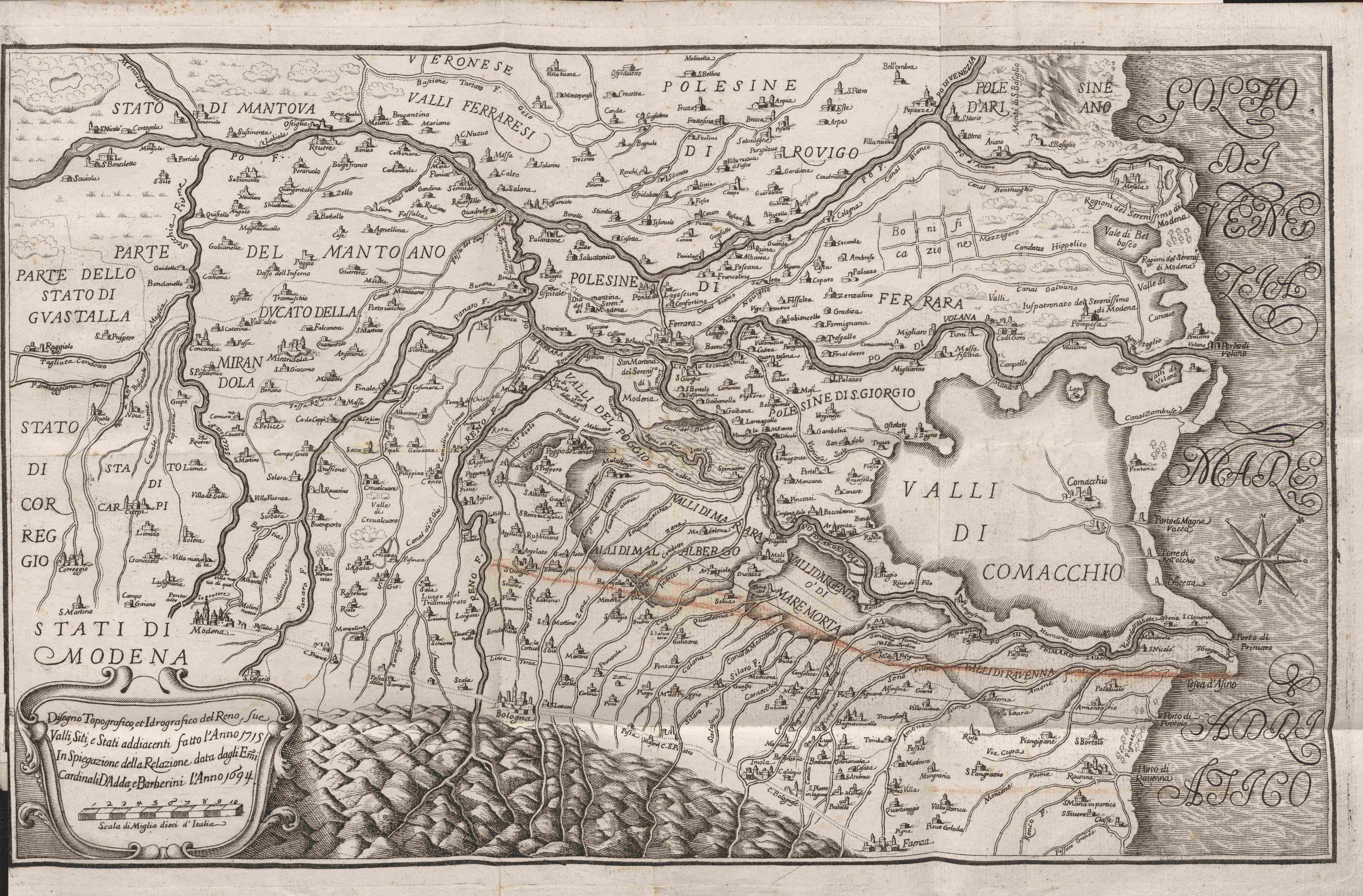
Reno River in 18th century
