= Gaspare Ungarelli =

Bolognese historian, librarian, and author (1852-1938)

- Born: November 19, 1852; Bologna, Kingdom of Italy
- Died: February 26, 1938 (aged 85)
- Occupations: Writer, librarian, author

Gaspare Ungarelli (19 November 1852 – 26 February 1938) was a Bolognese historian, librarian, and author at the Archiginnasio Communal Library. He is most notable for his compilation of the vocabulary of the Bolognese dialect in his book Vocabolario del dialetto bolognese.

== Biography ==
Gaspare got his first job at the age of 15-16 at the civil registry of Bologna, where he would work for six years until being transferred to the Archiginnasio Communal Library as an author. He spent the rest of his career there until he retired in 1908.

== Selected works ==
- Il generale Bonaparte in Bologna, 1921
