= Bolognese dialect =

Emilian dialect spoken in Bologna, Emilia-Romagna, Italy

Bolognese
- bulgnaiṡ
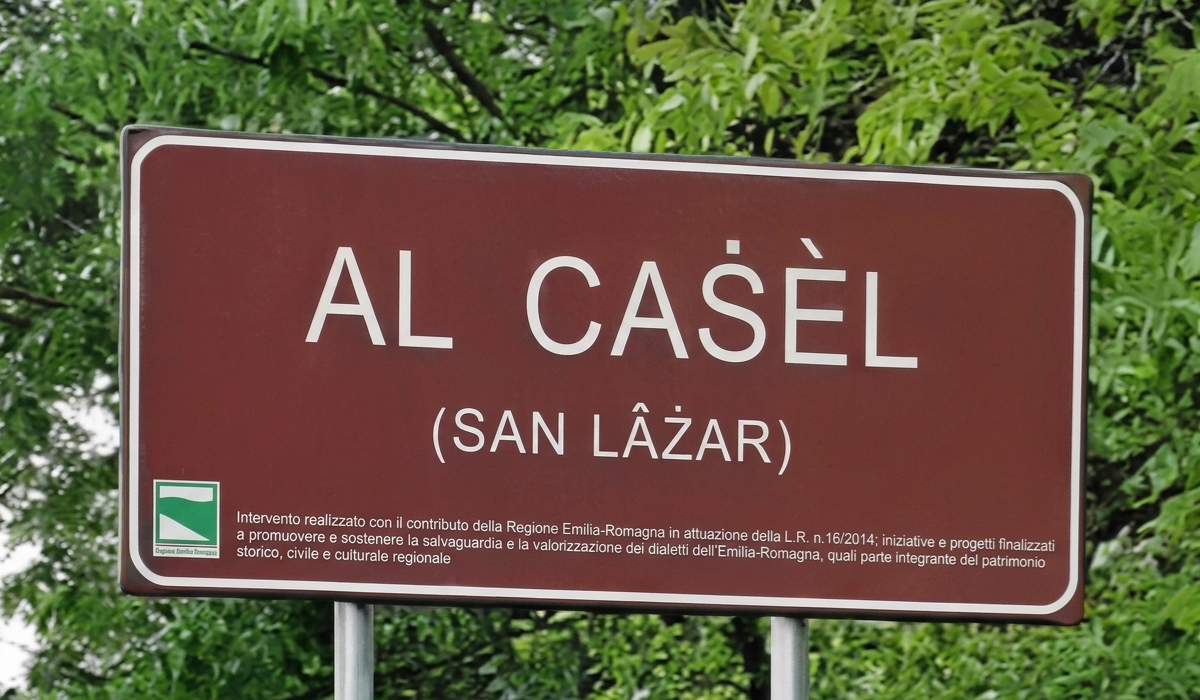
- Street sign in Bolognese at San Lazzaro di Savena, showing the letters ṡ and ż.
- Pronunciation: [buʎˈɲai̯z]
- Native to: Italy
- Language family: Indo-European: Italic; Latino-Faliscan; Romance; Italo-Western; Western Romance; Gallo-Romance; Gallo-Italic; Emilian–Romagnol; Emilian; Bolognese

Language codes
- ISO 639-3: –
- Glottolog: bolo1260
- Linguasphere: 51-AAA-okg
- IETF: egl-u-sd-itbo

Bolognese (native name: bulgnaiṡ [buʎˈɲai̯z]) is a dialect of Emilian spoken for the most part in the city of Bologna and its hinterland (except east of the Sillaro stream), but also in the district of Castelfranco Emilia in the province of Modena, and in the towns of Sambuca Pistoiese (Tuscany), Cento, Sant'Agostino, and Poggio Renatico (province of Ferrara).

== Terminology ==
Although the term dialect is commonly used in reference to all minority languages native to Italy, most of them are not mutually intelligible with Italian. Bolognese is no exception and so is an Emilian dialect, not an Italian one.

== Classification ==
Bolognese is a dialect of Emilian, one of the Gallo-Italic languages of the Romance family. It shares many common features with other Gallo-Italic languages such as Piedmontese, Lombard, Romagnol and Ligurian, and it is closer to them than to Italian.

The Bolognese dialect presents a rather rich variety of vernacular forms within its area of diffusion. The linguist Daniele Vitali distinguishes six main subvariants which, although presenting grammatical unity, differ in phonetic and lexical traits:

- Dialetto bolognese cittadino;
- Dialetti bolognesi montani medi;
- Dialetti bolognesi montani alti;
- Dialetti bolognesi della pianura occidentale;
- Dialetti bolognesi della pianura orientale;
- Dialetti bolognesi della pianura settentrionale.

== History ==
"… I say, then, that perhaps those are not wrong who claim that the Bolognese speak a more beautiful language than most, especially since they take many features of their own speech from that of the people who live around them, in Imola, Ferrara and Modena I believe that everybody does this with respect to his own neighbours.... So the above-mentioned citizens of Bologna take a soft, yielding quality from those of Imola, and from the people of Ferrara and Modena, on the other hand, a certain abruptness which is more typical of the Lombards.... If, then, the Bolognese take from all sides, as I have said, it seems reasonable to suggest that their language, tempered by the combination of opposites mentioned above, should achieve a praiseworthy degree of elegance; and this, in my opinion, is beyond doubt true."
(Dante Alighieri, De vulgari eloquentia - Liber I, xv, 2-5)

=== Middle Ages ===
Bolognese evolved a group of Gallo-Romance languages sharing features with neighbouring northern Italian languages. It developed more distinctly into the Middle Ages as a dialect of the Emilian language. During the High Middle Ages, a number of troubadours composing lyrical poetry were active in Bologna, especially during the 13th century. That served to raise cultural awareness to the possibility of composing songs, poems and other works in vernacular languages. One of the first references to Bolognese as a distinct language was made by Dante Alighieri, in his De vulgari eloquentia, written in the beginning of the 14th century.

=== Modern ===
During the boom of interest in linguistic diversity during the 19th century, a number of efforts were made to create vocabularies, grammars, and collections of axioms, folk tales, and literature. The first dictionary was compiled in 1901 by Gaspare Ungarelli, who also attempted to create a writing system using the Italian alphabet. A period of stigmatisation followed in the 20th century, where children were punished for speaking the dialect in school, as it was considered to be a sign of poor education and etiquette.

In 1964, Alberto Menarini proposed an alphabet with many of the same letters still used. In recent times, Bolognese has enjoyed a period of rebirth with some words, such as umarell, derived from Bolognese umarèl, becoming popular beyond Bologna itself.

== Phonology ==
Here are some prominent features of Bolognese phonology:

- centralized vowels [ɐ], [e̠], [ɛ̠], [i̠], [o̟], [ɔ̟], [ʌ̟] and [u̟] rather than /a/, /e/, /ɛ/, /i/, /o/, /ɔ/, /ʌ/ or /u/
- phonemic distinction between short vowels and corresponding long vowels/diphthongs
- nucleus vowel and coda consonant length having an inverse relationship
- realisation of labio–alveolar consonants
- syncopation resulting in complex consonant clusters
- frequent slacking of word-final voiceless obstruents
- more exaggerated intonation than in Italian

The phonemes of Bolognese are realized phonetically very differently depending on the area in or around Bologna. Much free variation occurs in words from complex phonological processes.

=== Consonants ===
Bolognese has 25 consonant phonemes:

Consonant phonemes of Bolognese
	Bilabial	Labio- dental	Dental	Alveolar	Labio- alveolar	Palatal	Velar	Labio- velar
Nasal	m			n		ɲ	ŋ	ŋʷ
Plosive	p b		t d				k ɡ	kʷ ɡʷ
Affricate					ts dz			
Fricative		f v	θ ð		s z			
Approximant				l		j		w
Trill				r				

The consonant [ʎ] only occurs allophonically or on Italian loanwords.

=== Vowels ===
Monophthong phonemes of Bolognese
	Front		Central	Back		
	Front		Central	Rounded		Unrounded
	short	long	short	short	long	short
Close	i	iː		u	uː	
Close-mid	e	eː	(ə)	o	oː	
Open-mid	æ	ɛː			ɔː	ʌ
Open	a	aː				

Bolognese dialect has 2 stressed diphthongs, namely /ai/ and /ʌu/.

Bolognese only allows the vowels /a/, /e/, /i/, /o/, /u/ on unstressed syllables.

=== Phonotactics ===
The general syllable structure of Bolognese syllables is:

(S)(C)(C)(V)V(C)(C)

S – either s or ṡ, and rarely f or p
C – consonant
V – vowel

Thus, Bolognese words can have up to three consonants in the initial group (e.g. ṡżlèr, ṡgrinzlîr, ṡbléṡṡg, spzèr, strén, scrîver, sfrunblè, ftléṅna, ftièri, friulàn, ptrugnàn, pscarî, pznén) and two consonants in the final group (e.g. gnanc, rimôrs, månnd, cunfinànt, pêrdga) (impermissible consonant combination will result in anaptyxis). Bolognese only allows 2 diphthongs namely /ai/ and /ʌu/ (e.g. cåurs, intåurn, ataiṡ, raiga). Orthographically, three consonants can exist simultaneously on coda (dåntr, cåntr, nòstr, sänpr as syncopic forms of dånter, cånter, nòster, sänper). However, it arises from -er only when the next word starts with a vowel and in actuality it's pronounced /-ŋ.(C)r(V)./

== Orthography ==
=== Vowel ===
Letter	Name	IPA	Example
a - à	a cûrta	/a/	lażż, casàtt
â	a lónga	/aː/	pajâz, râta
å	a srè	/ʌ/	Bulåggna, bån, tåurta
ä	e dimónndi avêrta e cûrta	/æ/	bän
e - é	e srè	/e/	economî - pén
è	e avêrta lónga	/ɛː/	lèder, mèder
ê	e lónga	/eː/	ṡvêlt, mêder, mêter
i - í	i	/i/	dṡvilópp - chíllo
î	i lónga	/iː/	Flîṡ, lîber
ò	o avêrta	/ɔː/	inbariagòt, còl, tòr
o - ó	o srè	/o/	mói, tóff
ô	o lónga	/oː/	fiôl, fiôl, nôv, côl, tôr
u - ú	u	/u/	sugabått, carbúrro
û	u lónga	/uː/	balûṡ, ligûr

- On monosyllabic words, accents are not marked if a word ends in a consonant: can, sacc. However, it is marked if it ends in a vowel pà, rà.
- The vowel å and ä are always stressed including the diphthong åu and ai (or ou and äi in the countryside). If another vowel is accented alongside ai, then the diphthong ai is not stressed, for example: maicàtt. This rule doesn't apply on the article äl(i) (since articles are never stressed) and compound words such as såuranómm where the stress falls on ó.
- The vowel í and ú are only used for loanwords to indicate stressed short i and u. For example: chíllo, carbúrro

=== Consonant ===
Letter	Name	IPA	Example
c (1)(3) - ch (2)	c dûra	/k/	calè, pchèr, ch'as, bajûc, trócc
c (2) - ci (1) - c' (3)	c dåulz	/ts/	cén, ciâpa, inbac'lèr, uràcc'
g (1)(3) - gh (2)	g dûra	/g/	ṡganbilèr, zighèla, brèg, dégg
g (2) - gi (1) - g' (3)	g dåulza	/dz/	ṡgâget, giósst, curâg', dågg'
gn	gn dåulza	/ɲ/	sgnåur, Raggn
gli	gl dåulza	/ʎ/	ṡbaglièr, incâglia, Emégglia
n (1)(2) - nn (3)	n	/n/	anâdra, scaldénn, månnd, cân
n (3)	n vlèr	/ŋ/	canvèr, scaldén, mand, påndg
ṅ (ṅn)	n vlèr	/ŋ.n/	curéṅna, ftléṅni
s	s såurda	/s/	sôrbel, papóss
ṡ	s sunôra	/z/	cûṡer, armàṡṡd
z	z såurda	/θ/	aziån, znèr, siucarézzi, ṡbózz
ż	z sunôra	/ð/	żûg, żnèr, ancóżżen, ṡmanàżż
j	j	/j/	tâja, tajja
s-ci		/sts/	s-ciavvd, s-ciôṡ, s-ciuptè
ṡ-gi		/zdz/	ṡ-giazèr, ṡ-girundlèr, ṡ-giusèr
g-li		/g.li/	neg-ligiänt, żug-linèr

(1) Followed by a, o, u
(2) Followed by i, e
(3) End of a syllable (coda) or followed by consonant

- The letter n is pronounced /n/ before vowels and after long vowels. nn digraph is pronounced /n/.
- The letter n is pronounced /ŋ/ finally or before consonants (including n however, in this case it is represented ṅn orthographically). /ŋ/ is lengthened after stressed vowel.
- The letter q is only used in the beginning of words. Therefore, it is written quâter but âcua.
- The letter j is only used between vowels. Therefore, it is written tâja, tajja but tâi, tai.
- The digraph ṅn is only used for feminine nouns.
- The trigraph gli is never found on native Bolognese words as Italian gli corresponds to j in Bolognese. They are found in Italian loanwords for example: butigliéṅna (bottiglina), sêglier (scegliere), bigliàtt (biglietto) and names such as Itâglia (Italia), Emégglia (Emilia), Giógglia (Giulia).
- A "-" is sometimes added to disambiguate separate syllables, for example: mâgn-ni? the interrogative form of mâgnen.
- Short vowels are always followed by a long consonant, and vice versa. For example: sacc and sâc, méll and mêl, córr and côr. This rule doesn't apply on compound words such as peppacûl.
- In some words, /ts/ and /dz/ can be written as ts/ds and dṡ thus reflecting its etymology and pronunciation. For example: tstón = c'tón, dscårrer = c'cårrer, dṡdétta = g'détta
- Palatization of l and n frequently occurs before the pronoun i and on articles such as äli ôv, däli ôv [æʎ.ʎi]. Example: al i à détt ch'a n i vâg pió is pronounced /aʎ.ʎi.adˈdetː kaɲ.ɲiˈvaːg ˈpjo/
- The dropping of the last vowel in a word is indicated with an apostrophe. For example: ch'al séppa, s'a l savêva, l'ôca, lî l'é, sått'âcua (apocopic forms of che, se, la, la, såtta). However, if the vowel is located at the beginning of a word, it is generally unmarked. For example: d avréll, l èṡen, ló l é, csa vût (apheresis forms of ed, al, al, syncopic forms of cusa).

== Grammar ==
=== Noun ===
Bolognese distinguishes two genders, masculine and feminine, and two numbers, single and plural. In most nouns, the suffix -a is added to the masculine word to indicate femininity: defizänt, defizänta; påndg, påndga.

The formation of Bolognese plurals is complicated. Unlike Italian, inflection usually happens not by adding suffixes but rather by apophony:

- å → ó: biånnd, "blond", biónnd, "blonds"
- ô → û: żnôc', "knee", żnûc', "knees"

However, when words that end with -èl or -ôl are pluralised, the -èl or -ôl is changed to -î and -û respectively: martèl, "hammer", martî, "hammers"; fiôl, "son", fiû "sons". There are some exceptions to that rule, such as nurmèl, "normal", which is unchanged when made plural, and some others, such as sàntel, "godfather", which are unchanged when made plural because words are not truncated, that is, with a stress that does not fall on è or ô.

Masculine words that end in a consonant are unchanged when made plural and so the number can be identified only by the preceding article: al râm, "the branch", i râm, "the branches". In addition, pluralised feminine words that are not constructed from a masculine word do not have an -a: la rôda, "the wheel", äl rôd, "the wheels". The plurals of feminine words constructed from masculine words are formed by using an -i instead of an -a: biånnda, "blonde", biånndi, "blondes"; ziéṅna "aunt", ziéṅni, "aunts".

Suffix		Example		Meaning
Masculine	Feminine	Masculine	Feminine	Meaning
-én	-éṅna	cinén	cinéṅna	piccolo
-ån	-åṅna	padrån	padråṅna	padrone
-ói	-ójja	mói	mójja	bagnato
-an	-èna	san	sèna	sano
-tåur	-trîz	atåur	atrîz	attore
C+el	C+la	dàbbel	dabbla	debole
C+en	C+na	intêren	intêrna	interno
C+er	C+ra	naigher	naigra	nero
c'	cia	vèc'	vècia	vecchio

Exception: bån, bôna

For masculine nouns whose feminine prefix is -assa, it will undergo vowel reduction due to different stress placement.

Bolognese		Italian		Meaning
Masculine	Feminine	Masculine	Feminine	Meaning
pränzip	prinzipassa	principe	principessa	prince
presidänt	presidentassa	presidente	presidentessa	president
poêta	poetassa	poeta	poetessa	poet
dócca	ducassa	duca	duchessa	duke
leån	leonassa	leone	leonessa	lion
cånt	cuntassa	conte	contessa	count
profesåur	profesorassa	professore	professoressa	professor
dutåur	duturassa	dottore	dottoressa	doctor

==== Masculine ====
Singular	Plural	Singular	Plural	Notes
-à-	-é-	al saggn	i séggn	Exception for -an- where it's invariable
-än-	-én-	al dänt	i dént	
-àtt	-étt	al casàtt	i casétt	
-ai-	-î-	al vaider	i vîder	
-ån-	-ón-	al limån	i limón	
-åu-	-û-	al fiåur	i fiûr	
-ôl	-û	al fiôl	i fiû	
-èc’	-îc’	al spèc’	i spîc’	
-èz	-îz	al pèz	i pîz	
-èż	-îż	al mèż	i mîż	
-èl	-î	al canèl	i canî	From Vulgar Latin -ello.
-èl		al canèl	i canèl	From Vulgar Latin -ale.
Ending in vowels		al dócca	i dócca	Invariable
Ending in vowels		al cínno	i cínno	Invariable
Ending in vowels		al comunéssta	i comunéssta	Invariable
Other cases		al gât	i gât	Invariable
Other cases		al can	i can	Invariable
Other cases		al zîl	i zîl	Invariable

No observable patterns exist for ô or ò. The raising of ô or ò into û on plural forms result if said vowel comes right before Latin nominative plural suffix -ī, for example: al ciôd - i ciûd (from Latin clāvī) and al òc' - i ûc' (from Vulgar Latin oclī). Otherwise, it is invariable for example: al sôld - i sôld (from Latin solidī) and l òmen - i òmen (from Latin hominēs). However, sound changes have long since obscured this pattern.

==== Feminine ====
Singular	Plural	Singular	Plural	Notes
Ends in a	Drops a	la scrâna	äl scrân	Ends in unstressed a
Ends in a	Drops a	la vâca	äl vâc	Ends in unstressed a
Ends in a	Ends in i	la gâta	äl gâti	Feminine noun derived from masculine noun
Ends in a	Ends in i	la quajåṅna	äl quajåṅni	Feminine noun derived from masculine noun
C+la	C+el	la nóvvla	äl nóvvel	
C+na	C+en	la cavêrna	äl cavêren	
C+ra	C+er	la fîvra	äl fîver	
C+ma	C+um	l’ânma	äli ânum	
C+va	C+uv	la cunsêrva	äl cunsêruv	
End in stressed syllable		la situaziån	äl situaziån	Invariable
End in stressed syllable		la trunè	äl trunè	Invariable
End in stressed syllable		la våuṡ	äl våuṡ	Invariable
End in stressed syllable		la pû	äl pû	Invariable
End in stressed syllable		la cà	äl cà	Invariable

==== Alteration ====
Alteration is the formation of words from others that are not changed in their fundamental features; instead, the way in which the concept is considered changes.

Alteration	Bolognese			Italian		
Alteration	Suffix	Masculine	Feminine	Suffix	Masculine	Feminine
Nominative		cavâl	bistiôla		cavallo	bestiola
Diminutive	-én	cavalén	bistiéṅna	-ino	cavallino	bestiolina
Vezzeggiativo	-ózz	cavalózz	bistiózza	-uccio	cavalluccio	bestiuccio
Vezzeggiativo	-òt	cavalòt	bistiòta	-otto	cavallotto	bestiotta
Vezzeggiativo	-àtt	cavalàtt	bistiatta	-etto	cavalletto	bestietta
Vezzeggiativo	-ôl	cavalôl	bistiôla	-olo	cavallolo	bestiola
Vezzeggiativo	-èl			-ello		
Augmentative	-ån	cavalån	bistiåṅna	-one	cavallone	bestiona
Pejorative	-âz	cavalâz	bistiâza	-accio	cavallaccio	bestiaccia

The alterations can be added together to form chains:

- pôver, puvrén, puvrinén, puvrininén = povero, poverino

The alteration suffix is always stressed. Therefore, vowel reduction occurs:

- åura, uratta = ora, oretta
- dòna, dunèla = donna, donnina
- fiåur, fiurlén = fiore, fiorellino
- vaider, vidrén = vetro, vetrino

Often alterations change the gender of words:

- la dòna, al dunén, al dunån = la donna, la donnina, la donnona
- la mâchina, al machinén, al machinån = l’auto, la piccola auto, la grande auto
- l’unbrèla, l unbarlén, l unbarlån = l’ombrello, l’ombrellino, l’ombrellone

==== Proper Names ====
The neutral form is used especially for Saints or if preceded by the title Sgnèr / Sgnèra (urban) or Sgnåur / Sgnåura (provincial).

Neutral		Altered		Italian	
m	f	m	f	m	f
Pèvel	Pèvla	Pavlén	Pavléṅna	Paolo	Paola
Chèrel	Chèrla	Carlén	Carléṅna	Carlo	Carla
Żvân	Żvâna	Żvanén	Żvanéṅna	Giovanni	Giovanna
Clèvi	Clèvia	Clavién	Claviéṅna	Claudio	Claudia
Mârio	Marî	Marién	Mariéṅna	Mario	Maria
Pîr	-	Pirén, Piràtt	Pirûla	Pietro	-
Iuṡèf	-	Iusfén, Iusfàtt	Ióffa	Giuseppe	-
Franzàssc	-	Chichén, Chicån	-	Francesco	-
-	Luîṡa	Luiṡén, Luiṡån	-	-	Luisa
-	Délla	-	Deléṅna	-	Adele

Altered forms of the feminine often become masculine:

- Marién (Mârio) = Mario, Maria
- Tiriṡén = Teresa

=== Adjectives ===
Adjective become the feminine form by adding -a to masculine, therefore they form plural similar to feminine nouns derived from masculine nouns.

- Singular: un gât grand (masculine), una gâta granda (feminine)
- Plural: dû gât grand (masculine), dåu gâti grandi (feminine)
- Singular: un ragâz bèl (masculine), una ragâza bèla (feminine)
- Plural: dû ragâz bî (masculine), dåu ragâzi bèli (feminine)

Masculine		Feminine	
Singular	Plural	Singular	Plural
sutîl	sutîla	sutîl	sutîli
difézzil	difézzil	difézzil	difézzili
uriginèl	uriginèl	uriginèl	uriginèl(i)

Adjective Order:

1. Some adjective (such as the one pertaining to orders) must go before the noun:

- al mî ûltum viâż = il mio ultimo viaggio
- al nòster prémm fiôl = il nostro primo figlio
- al tô ex maré = il suo ex marito

2. Other adjectives can go before or after the noun in Italian, while in Bolognese it is preferable to put them after:

- l à fât una léssta lónga = ha fatto una lunga lista
- l à cunprè la mâchina nôva = ha preso la nuova auto
- i én parté pr un viâż cûrt = sono partiti per un breve viaggio
- i an catè un apartamänt cinén = hanno trovato un piccolo appartamento

Exception for vèg = strano

- l é un vèg fât = è un fatto strano / è uno strano fatto
- l é un vèg sugèt = è uno strano tipo

3. Some adjectives are often placed before the noun as in Italian because by putting them after the noun, a slight variation in meaning would be obtained:

After			Before		
Bolognese	Italian	English	Bolognese	Italian	English
un òmen grand	un omone	a big (size) man	un gran òmen	un grand’uomo	a great man
un sumâr grand	un asino grande	a big (size) donkey	un gran sumâr	un asino matricolato	a capable donkey
un can brótt	un cane brutto	an ugly dog	un brótt can	un cagnaccio	a despicable dog
un òmen puvràtt	un uomo povero	an economically poor man	un pôvr òmen	un pover’uomo	a man in poor condition
un amîg vèc’	un amico Vecchio	an old (age) friend	un vèc’ amîg	un vecchio amico	an old friend

These adjectives placed before the noun actually very often have a figurative meaning. “Grand” more often expresses quality than size. Brótt does not necessarily express aesthetic ugliness but a generic pejorative “-accio” (“-âz” in Bolognese). Puvràtt does not express little wealth, but an unhappy condition.

4. To express dimensions (both large and small), in Bolognese, it is preferable to use the augmentative –ån, -åna and the diminutive én, éna, àtt, àtta, etc. Therefore, to say “a small house” would be “una caṡlatta” and certainly not “una cén cà”! Even figurative expressions (a little help, a little stylist) should be translated with a few turns of phrase: (un pôc d’ajût, un stiléssta in fâza)

==== Superlativo ====
Superlativo Assoluto
Superlativo Assoluto		Grand	Spass	Eṡât	Bän	Vèc’	Bèl	Èlt	Fén
Singular	Masculine	grandéssum	speséssum	eṡatéssum	benéssum	vcéssum	beléssum	altéssum	finéssum
Singular	Feminine	grandéssima	speséssima	eṡatéssima	benéssima	vcéssima	beléssima	altéssima	finéssima
Plural	Masculine	grandéssum	speséssum	eṡatéssum	benéssum	vcéssum	beléssum	altéssum	finéssum
Plural	Feminine	grandéssimi	speséssimi	eṡatéssimi	benéssimi	vcéssimi	beléssim	altéssimi	finéssimi

Superlativo Assoluto
Superlativo Assoluto		Ṡvêlt	Alżîr	Spòrc	Brótt	Nôv	Bån	Dåulz	Dûr
Singular	Masculine	ṡveltéssum	alżiréssum	spurchéssum	brutéssum	nuvéssum	bunéssum	dulzéssum	duréssum
Singular	Feminine	ṡveltéssima	alżiréssima	spurchéssima	brutéssima	nuvéssima	bunéssima	dulzéssima	duréssima
Plural	Masculine	ṡveltéssum	alżiréssum	spurchéssum	brutéssum	nuvéssum	bunéssum	dulzéssum	duréssum
Plural	Feminine	ṡveltéssimi	alżiréssimi	spurchéssmi	brutéssimi	nuvéssimi	bunéssimi	dulzéssimi	duréssimi

Superlativo Relativo

article + pió + noun + ed

- l’é la pió brèva dla clâs = è la più brava della classe
- l é al pió inṡmé dal pajaiṡ = è il più fesso di tutto il paese
- al pió baciócc ed tótt l ufézzi = il più scemo di tutto l’ufficio

Comparative

There are three types of comparative in Bolognese:

A. More than (pió … che)

- la Giógglia l’é pió granda che mé = Giulia è più alta di me
- l é pió bèl che fûrb = è più bello che furbo

B. Less than (manc … che)

- l é manc żåuven che mé = è meno giovane di me
- mé a sån manc vèc’ che Pèvel = io sono meno vecchio di Paolo

C. Same as (cunpâgna)

- Sandrén l é grand cunpâgna mé = Sandro è alto come me
- Mé a sån grand cunpâgna Sandrén = Io sono alto come Sandro

Special forms

meglio / migliore

- l é méi = è meglio
- l é al miåur / l’é la miåura = è il / la migliore
- al żugadåur miåur = il giocatore migliore
- la żugadåura miåura = la giocatrice migliore
- i żugadûr miûr = i giocatori migliori
- äl żugadåuri miåuri = le giocatrici migliori

peggio / peggiore

- l é pîz = è peggio
- l é al / l’é la pîz = è il / la peggiore

=== Article ===
Pronoun		Definite	Indefinite
singular	masculine	al/l	un
singular	feminine	la/l'	(u)na
plural	masculine	i	di
plural	feminine	äl(i)	däl(i)

Orthographic rules

Article		Before consonant	Before vowel
definite	masculine	al fiåur, al studänt	l òmen, l ân
definite	feminine	la tuṡatta, la cà	l'åura, l'ôca
indefinite	masculine	un fiåur, un studänt	un òmen, un ân
indefinite	feminine	una tuṡatta, una cà	un'åura, un'ôca
plural	masculine	i fiûr, i studént	i òmen, i ân
plural	feminine	äl tuṡatt, äl cà	äli åur, äli ôc

==== Partitive ====
The plural of the articles un, una, does not exist. Instead, the partitive is used, consisting of the articulated forms of the preposition ed, or the adjective socuànt/socuànti (alcuni/alcune) “some”:

Bolognese			Italian		
Masculine	Feminine		Masculine	Feminine	
di cunén	däl vâc	däli èv	dei conigli	delle mucche	delle api
socuànt cunén	socuànti vâc	socuànti èv	alcuni conigli	alcune mucche	alcune api

In negative sentences, the partitive is used without the article (ed + noun), as in French.

- an i é brîṡa ed zóccher = non c’è zucchero
- la n pôl brîṡa avair ed fiû = non può avere figli

In Bolognese, the partitive is used more often than in Italian:

- con di sû amîg = con alcuni suoi amici
- i vànden di lanpadèri e dla ròba da elètrica = vendono lampadari e attrezzature elettriche
- a mâgn däl pan con däl salâm = mangio pane e salame

=== Preposition ===
Combination with articles

Preposition	al	l	la	l'	i	äl	äli
ed	dal	dl	dla	dl'	di	däl	däli
a	al	al	ala	al'	ai	al	ali
da	dal	dal	dala	dal'	dai	dal	dali
par	pr al	par l	par la	par l'	pr i	pr äl	pr äli
con	con al	con l	con la	con l'	coi	col	coli
in	int al	int l	int la	int l'	int i	int äl	int äli
só	só l	só l	só la	só l'	só i	só l	sóli

Orthographic rules:

- The preposition in is written int before definite and indefinite articles and in elsewhere.
- The preposition ed is written d before words starting with vowels and ed elsewhere.
- The preposition par is written pr before words starting with vowels and par elsewhere.

==== Special Construction ====
Adjectives not directly connected to a noun or to the verb èser are governed by the preposition ed (possibly in the partitive forms).

- ai n é ónna däl nôvi = ce n’è una novità
- adès a t n in dégg ónna däl bèli = adesso te ne dico una bella

When the verb piacere or provare governs an infinitive verb, the preposition ed is needed:

- am pièṡ ed magnèr = mi piace mangiare
- ala Marî ai pièṡ ed viażèr = a Maria piace viaggiare
- a pruvän ed córrer = proviamo a correre
- äl prôven ed fèr incôsa = provano a far tutto

Verbs indicating a purpose is preceded with the preposition ed as opposed to a:

- al l à ublighè ed magnèr = l’ha obbligato a mangiare
- la i à insgnè ed żughèr al chèrt lónghi = gli ha insegnato a giocare al tarocchino bolognese
- l à inparè ed sièr = ha imparato a sciare
- stà aténti ed scrîver drétt = sta’ attento a scrivere dritto

Some fixed expression utilize the preposition da which precedes adverbs as opposed to a:

- al lât l é andè da mèl = il latte è andato a male
- lu-lé l é un bån da gnînta = quello lì è un buono a niente
- a n in pòs pió fèr da manc = non ne posso più fare a meno

When verbs of perception (vàdder to see, sénter to feel) follow an infinitive verb, the preposition "a" is needed:

- a t ò vésst a fumèr = ti ho visto fumare
- a l ò sintó a cantèr = ti ho sentito/sentita cantare

The verbs “dîr, dscårrer” with the meaning of “to address” take the preposition “con”, while in Italian “dire, parlare” take “a”:

- a dscårr con té = parlo a te
- dîl con tô surèla = dillo a tua sorella
- al dégg con té / tîg = dico a te

dire (conjugated) or parlare (conjugated) + a = dîr (conjugated) or dscårrer (conjugated) + con

- a dscårr con té = parlo a te
- dîl con tô surèla = dillo a tua sorella

stare (conjugated) + a = stèr (conjugated) + da (stèr + a carry a different meaning in Bolognese)

- stâm da sénter = stammi a sentire
- stè mò d’asculter = state ad ascoltare
- a starän da vàdder = staremo a vedere
- a stän d’asptèr = aspettiamo

dietro + a = drî + da (drî + a carry a different meaning in Bolognese)

- si è nascosto dietro alla porta = al s é arpiatè drî dal óss
- vado dietro a quell'albero = a vâg drî da cl âlber

The preposition su = só especially in figurative sense or in vatta especially in material sense.

- al i à pinsè un pôc só = ci ha pensato un po’ su
- l é só la tèvla = è sulla tavola
- in vatta la tèvla = sul tavolo

=== Pronoun ===
==== Personal Pronoun ====
Number		Nominative	Clitic Pronoun	Interrogative suffix	Dative	Con +	Possessive Adjective
singular	1	mé	a(i)	ia	am	mîg	mî
singular	2	té	(e)t	(e)t	at	tîg	tô, tô, tû, tåu
singular	3.m	ló	al/l	(e)l	ai	sîg	sô, sô, sû, såu
singular	3.f	lî	la/l'	la	ai	sîg	sô, sô, sû, såu
plural	1	nuèter	a(i)	ia	as	nòsc	nòster, nòstra, nûster, nòstri
plural	2	vuèter	a(i)	v	av	vòsc	vòster, vòstra, vûster, vòstri
plural	3.m	låur	i	i	ai	sîg	sô, sô, sû, såu
plural	3.f	låur	äl(i)	i	ai	sîg	sô, sô, sû, såu

If the conjugated verb starts with unstressed a, the clitic pronoun a(i) is dropped. For example mé arîv, nuèter arivän

Formal pronouns are used to replace 2nd person pronoun to indicate politeness or courtesy. Formal pronouns in Bolognese include ló for masculine and lî for feminine.

- êl ló al dutåur? ch’al s acòmda! = È lei il dottore? Si accomodi!
- êla lî la duturassa? ch’la s acòmda! = È lei la dottoressa? Si accomodi!

==== Demonstrative Pronoun and Adjective ====
Demonstrative		Pronoun		Adjective	
Demonstrative		Proximal	Distal	Proximal	Distal
Singular	Masculine	quasst	quall	st(e)	c(a)l
Singular	Feminine	quassta	qualla	sta	cla
Plural	Masculine	quíssti	quî	sti	chi
Plural	Feminine	quassti	qualli	stäl(i)	cäl(i)

Note: ste and sta elides before words starting with vowels. For example: A quest'ora. Che ora è? = Da st’åura. Ch’åur’é?

Orthographic rules

Pronoun		Before consonant	Before vowel
singular	masculine	st(e) gât, cal gât	st amîg, cl amîg
singular	feminine	sta gâta, cla gâta	st’amîga, cl'amîga
plural	masculine	sti gât, chi gât	sti amîg, chi amîg
plural	feminine	stäl gâti, cäl gâti	stäli amîghi, cäli amîghi

Demonstrative pronouns or adjective are almost always followed by adverbs indicating degrees of distance:

1. (qué) near the speaker

- a tói ste bichîr qué = prendo questo bicchiere
- al mî bichîr l é quasst qué = il mio bicchiere è questo

2. (lé) further away from the speaker, often near the listener

- dâm bän cla biziclatta lé = dammi quella bicicletta
- la tô biziclatta l’é qualla lé = la tua bicicletta è quella

3. (là) even further away from the speaker and the listener

- guèrda cla cà là = guarda quella casa
- la sô cà l’é qualla là = la sua casa è quella

==== Locative ====
Positive: ai é

- ai é un òmen = c’è un uomo
- ai é una dòna = c’è una donna
- ai é di òmen = ci sono degli uomini
- ai é däl dòn = ci sono delle donne
- ai n é una carovèna = ce n'è una carovana
- ai é dû ân a dîr = ci sono due anni di differenza
- dóvv ai é la pèṡ ai é la cuntintazza = dove c'è pace c'è letizia

Negative: an i é

- an i é brîṡa mî mèder = non c’è mia madre
- an i é brîṡa i mî fradî = non ci sono i miei fratelli
- an i é inción = non c’è nessuno
- an i é ânma nèda = non c'è anima viva
- an i é brîṡa i mî fradî = non ci sono i miei fratelli

==== Partitive ====
(i)n = ne

- ai n é di nûv = ve ne sono di nuovi
- a in mâgn apanna dåu o trai = ne mangio appena due o tre
- Gigén Lîvra l in sà un pónt pió dal dièvel = Luigi Lepri ne sa una più del diavolo
- mo mé a m n in sån adè es al ò catè = ma io me ne sono accorto e l’ho trovato
- con l ajût ed Dagnêl ch'l i n à żuntè socuanti = con l'aiuto di Daniele che ne ha aggiunte alcune
- mé a n in vói pió = io non ne voglio più
- a n in pòs pió fèr da manc = non ne posso più fare a meno
- chi an n à brîṡa as plócca la camîṡa = chi non ne ha si pilucca la camicia

=== Verb ===
To form the interrogative form, euphonic vowels on the verb must be removed including on -en endings. For 3rd and 1st person singular, final unstressed a must also be removed. For example: a dâg > dâghia, a mâgnen > mâgn-ni, l avêva > avêvel

==== Vowel Reduction ====
Vowel reduction happens when the penultimate vowel is stressed in the present indicative and present subjunctive mood. No observable pattern exists.

1st Conjugation (-èr)
Persåṅna	Cantèr	Magnèr	Farmèr	Inparèr	Entrèr	Pedghèr	Creèr	Preghèr	Pinsèr	Prilèr	Arivèr	Osesionèr	Bluchèr	Insujèr	Druvèr	Ajutèr	Cunprèr	Vulèr
Mé	a cant	a mâgn	a fairum	a inpèr	ai änter	a pèdg	a créi	a prêg	a päns	a préll	arîv	ai osesiån	a blòc	a insói	a drôv	ajût	a cånper	a våul
Té	et cant	et mâgn	et fairum	t inpèr	t änter	et pèdg	et créi	et prêg	et päns	et préll	t arîv	t osesiån	et blòc	t insói	et drôv	t ajût	et cånper	et våul
Ló	al canta	al mâgna	al fairma	l inpèra	l äntra	al pèdga	al créjja	al prêga	al pänsa	al prélla	l arîva	l osesiåna	al blòca	l insójja	al drôva	al ajûta	al cånpra	al våula
Lî	la canta	la mâgna	la fairma	l’inpèra	l’äntra	la pèdga	la créjja	la prêga	la pänsa	la prélla	l’arîva	l’osesiåna	la blòca	l’insójja	la drôva	la ajûta	la cånpra	la våula
Nuèter	a cantän	a magnän	a farmän	a inparän	ai enträn	a pedgän	a crejjän	a pregän	a pinsän	a prilän	arivän	ai osesionän	a blucän	a insujän	a druvän	ajutän	a cunprän	a vulän
Vuèter	a cantè	a magnè	a farmè	a inparè	ai entrè	a pedghè	a crejjè	a pregè	a pinsè	a prilè	arivè	ai osesionè	a blucè	a insujè	a druvè	ajutè	a cunprè	a vulè
Låur	i/äl canten	i/äl mâgnen	i/äl fairmen	i/äli inpèren	i/äli äntren	i/äl pèdgen	i/äl créjjen	i/äl prêgen	i/äli pänsen	i/äli préllen	i/äli arîven	i/äli osesiånen	i/äl blòcen	i/äli insójjen	i/äl drôven	i/äli ajûten	i/äl cånpren	i/äl våulen

Some verbs can have two variants of vowel reduction: Inpruṡèr > a inprûṡ or a inpròṡ

For some verbs, vowel reduction happens on the penultimate vowel instead:

1st Conjugation (-èr)
Persåṅna	Abitèr	Viṡitèr	Zircolèr	Indichèr	Giudichèr
Mé	âbit	a vîṡit	a zîrcol	a énndic	a gióddic
Té	t âbit	et vîṡit	et zîrcol	t énndic	et gióddic
Ló	l âbita	al vîṡita	al zîrcola	al énndica	al gióddica
Lî	l’âbita	la vîṡita	la zîrcola	la énndica	la gióddica
Nuèter	abitän	a viṡitän	a zircolonän	a inndicän	a giudicän
Vuèter	abitè	a viṡitè	a zircolonè	a inndicè	a giudicè
Låur	i/äli âbiten	i/äl vîṡiten	i/äl zîrcolen	i/äl énndicen	i/äl gióddica

Some verbs with consonant clusters before -èr will have an extra vowel added:

1st Conjugation (-èr)
Persåṅna	Ṡżlèr	Spzèr	Pschèr	Avlèr
Mé	a ṡżêl	a spèz	a passc	avail
Té	et ṡżêl	et spèz	et passc	t avail
Ló	al ṡżêla	al spèza	al passca	l availa
Lî	la ṡżêla	la spèza	la passca	l’availa
Nuèter	a ṡżlän	a spzän	a pschän	avlän
Vuèter	a ṡżlè	a spzè	a pschè	avlè
Låur	i/äl ṡżêlen	i/äl spèzen	i/äl passcen	i/äli availen

For type 3 conjugations, the stressing of the infinitive takes place not on the final syllable. Therefore, the cases of when vowel reduction happen changes. Example vàdder (a vadd, a vdän).

3rd Conjugation (-er)
Persåṅna	Arspånnder	Bàvver	Vànnder	Abâter	Pièṡer	Lèżer	Métter	Pêrder	Scrîver	Córrer	Môver	Crûver
Mé	arspånnd	a bavv	a vannd	abât	a pièṡ	a lèż	a métt	a pêrd	a scrîv	a córr	a môv	a crûv
Té	t arspånnd	et bavv	et vannd	t abât	et pièṡ	et lèż	et métt	et pêrd	et scrîv	et córr	et môv	et crûv
Ló	l arspånnd	al bavv	al vannd	l abât	al pièṡ	al lèż	al métt	al pêrd	al scrîv	al córr	al môv	al crûv
Lî	l’arspånnd	la bavv	la vannd	l’abât	la pièṡ	la lèż	la métt	la pêrd	la scrîv	la córr	la môv	la crûv
Nuèter	arspundän	a bvän	a vindän	abatän	a piaṡän	a liżän	a mitän	a pirdän	a scrivän	a curän	a muvän	a cruvän
Vuèter	arspundänî	a bvî	a vindî	abatî	a piaṡî	a liżî	a mitî	a pirdî	a scrivî	a curî	a muvî	a cruvî
Låur	i/äli arspånnden	i/äl bavven	i/äl vannden	i/äli abâten	i/äl pièṡen	i/äl lèżen	i/äl métten	i/äl pêrden	i/äl scrîven	i/äl córren	i/äl môven	i/äl crûven

Vowel reduction never happens on the 4th conjugation (-îr) since the stress never falls on the stem.

==== Auxiliary ====
Èser
Persåṅna	Fåurma afermatîva				Fåurma interugatîva			
Persåṅna	Preṡänt	Inparfèt	Pasè luntàn	Futûr	Preṡänt	Inparfèt	Pasè luntàn	Futûr
Mé	a sån	ai êra	a fó	a srò	såggna?	êria?	fójja?	sròja?
Té	t î	t êr	et fóss	et srè	ît?	êret?	fósset?	srèt?
Ló	l é	l êra	al fó	al srà	êl?	êrel?	fóll?	srèl?
Lî	l’é	l’êra	la fó	la srà	êla?	êrla?	fólla?	srèla?
Nuèter	a sän	ai êren	a fónn	a srän	saggna?	êrgna?	fóggna?	sraggna?
Vuèter	a sî	ai êri	a fóssi	a srî	sîv?	êri?	fóssi?	srîv?
Låur	i én	i êren	i fónn	i sran	êni?	êrni?	fónni?	srèni?
Låur	äli én	äli êren	äl fónn	äl sran	êni?	êrni?	fónni?	srèni?

Persåṅna	Fåurma afermatîva				Fåurma interugatîva
Persåṅna	Congiuntîv			Condiziunèl	Condiziunèl
Persåṅna	Preṡänt		Pasè	Condiziunèl	Condiziunèl
Mé	ch’a séppa	sîa	ch’a fóss	a srêv	sréjja?
Té	ch’et sépp		ch’et fóss	et sréss	srésset?
Ló	ch’al séppa	sîa	ch’al fóss	al srêv	sréll?
Lî	ch’la séppa	sîa	ch’la fóss	la srêv	srélla?
Nuèter	ch’a saggna		ch’a fóssen	a srénn	sréggna?
Vuèter	ch’a siêdi		ch’a fóssi	a sréssi	sréssi?
Låur	ch’i séppen	sîen	ch’i fóssen	i srénn	srénni?
Låur	ch’äl séppen	sîen	ch’äl fóssen	äl srénn	srénni?

Gerund: esànd

Past participle: stè

Imperative: séppet (2nd.sg), saggna (1st.pl), siêdi (2nd.pl)

Avair
Persåṅna	Fåurma afermatîva				Fåurma interugatîva			
Persåṅna	Preṡänt	Inparfèt	Pasè luntàn	Futûr	Preṡänt	Inparfèt	Pasè luntàn	Futûr
Mé	ai ò	avêva	avé	arò	òja?	avêvia?	avéjja?	aròja?
Té	t è	t avêv	t avéss	t arè	èt?	avêvet?	avésset?	arèt?
Ló	l à	l avêva	l avé	l arà	èl?	avêvel?	avéll?	arèl?
Lî	l’à	l’avêva	l’avé	l’arà	èla?	avêvla?	avélla?	arèla?
Nuèter	avän	avêven	avénn	arän	avaggna?	avêvgna?	avéggna?	araggna?
Vuèter	avî	avêvi	avéssi	arî	avîv?	avêviv?	avéssiv?	arîv?
Låur	i/äli an	i/äli avêven	i/äli avénn	i/äli aràn	èni?	avêvni?	avénni?	arèni?

Persåṅna	Fåurma afermatîva			Fåurma interugatîva
Persåṅna	Congiuntîv		Condiziunèl	Condiziunèl
Persåṅna	Preṡänt	Pasè	Condiziunèl	Condiziunèl
Mé	ch’ai èva	ch’avéss	arêv	aréjja?
Té	ch’t èv	ch’t avéss	t aréss	arésset?
Ló	ch’l èva	ch’l avéss	l arêv	aréll?
Lî	ch’l’èva	ch’l’avéss	l’arêv	arélla?
Nuèter	ch’avaggna	ch’avéssen	arénn	aréggna?
Vuèter	ch’avêdi	ch’avéssi	aréssi	aréssi?
Låur	ch’i/ch’äli èven	ch’i/ch’äli avéssen	i/äli arénn	arénni?

Gerund: avànd

Past participle: avó

Imperative: èvet (2nd.sg), avaggna (1st.pl), avêdi (2nd.pl)

==== Regular ====
1st Conjugation (-èr) Mandèr
Persåṅna	Fåurma afermatîva				Fåurma interugatîva			
Persåṅna	Preṡänt	Inparfèt	Pasè luntàn	Futûr	Preṡänt	Inparfèt	Pasè luntàn	Futûr
Mé	a mand	a mandèva	a mandé	a mandarò	mandia?	mandèvia?	mandéjja?	mandaròja?
Té	et mand	et mandèv	et mandéss	et mandarè	mandet?	mandèvet?	mandésset?	mandarèt?
Ló	al manda	al mandèva	al mandé	al mandarà	mandel?	mandèvel?	mandéll?	mandarèl?
Lî	la manda	la mandèva	la mandé	la mandarà	mandla?	mandèvla?	mandélla?	mandarèla?
Nuèter	a mandän	a mandèven	a mandénn	a mandarän	mandaggna?	mandèvgna?	mandéggna?	mandaraggna?
Vuèter	a mandè	a mandèvi	a mandéssi	a mandarî	mandèv	mandèviv	mandéssiv	mandarîv
Låur	i/äl manden	i/äl mandèven	i/äl mandénn	i/äl mandaràn	mandni	mandèvni	mandénni	mandarèni

Persåṅna	Fåurma afermatîva			Fåurma interugatîva
Persåṅna	Congiuntîv		Condiziunèl	Condiziunèl
Persåṅna	Preṡänt	Pasè	Condiziunèl	Condiziunèl
Mé	ch’a manda	ch’a mandéss	a mandarêv	mandaréjja?
Té	ch’et mand	ch’et mandéss	t mandaréss	mandarésset?
Ló	ch’al manda	ch’al mandéss	al mandarêv	mandaréll?
Lî	ch’la manda	ch’la mandéss	la mandarêv	mandarélla?
Nuèter	ch’a mandaggna	ch’a mandéssen	a mandarénn	mandaréggna?
Vuèter	ch’a mandèdi	ch’a mandéssi	a mandaréssi	mandaréssiv?
Låur	ch’i/ch’äl manden	ch’i/ch’äl mandéssen	i/äl mandarénn	mandarénni?

Gerund: mandànd

Past participle: mandè

Imperative: manda (2nd.sg), mandän (1st.pl), mandè (2nd.pl)

2nd Conjugation (-air) Parair
Persåṅna	Fåurma afermatîva				Fåurma interugatîva			
Persåṅna	Preṡänt	Inparfèt	Pasè luntàn	Futûr	Preṡänt	Inparfèt	Pasè luntàn	Futûr
Mé	a pèr	a parêva	a paré	a par-rò	pèria?	parêvia?	paréjja?	par-ròja?
Té	et pèr	et parêv	et paréss	et par-rè	pèret?	parêvet?	parésset?	par-rèt?
Ló	al pèr	al parêva	al paré	al par-rà	pèrel?	parêvel?	paréll?	par-rèl?
Lî	la pèr	la parêva	la paré	la par-rà	pèrla?	parêvla?	parélla?	par-rèla?
Nuèter	a parän	a parêven	a parénn	a par-rän	paraggna?	parêvgna?	paréggna?	par-raggna?
Vuèter	a parî	a parêvi	a paréssi	a par-rî	parîv?	parêviv?	paréssiv?	par-rîv?
Låur	i/äl pèren	i/äl parêven	i/äl parénn	i/äl par-ràn	pèrni?	parêvni	parénni	par-rènni?

Persåṅna	Fåurma afermatîva			Fåurma interugatîva
Persåṅna	Congiuntîv		Condiziunèl	Condiziunèl
Persåṅna	Preṡänt	Pasè	Condiziunèl	Condiziunèl
Mé	ch’a pèra	ch’a paréss	a parêv	paréjja?
Té	ch’et pèr	ch’et paréss	t paréss	parésset?
Ló	ch’al pèra	ch’al paréss	al parêv	paréll?
Lî	ch’la pèra	ch’la paréss	la parêv	parélla?
Nuèter	ch’a paraggna	ch’a paréssen	a parénn	paréggna?
Vuèter	ch’a parèdi	ch’a paréssi	a paréssi	paréssiv?
Låur	ch’i/ch’äl pèren	ch’i/ch’äl paréssen	i/äl parénn	parénni?

Gerund: parànd

Past participle: pèrs

Imperative: pèr (2nd.sg), parän (1st.pl), parè (2nd.pl)

3rd Conjugation (-er / -årr) Adlîżer
Persåṅna	Fåurma afermatîva				Fåurma interugatîva			
Persåṅna	Preṡänt	Inparfèt	Pasè luntàn	Futûr	Preṡänt	Inparfèt	Pasè luntàn	Futûr
Mé	adlîż	adliżêva	adliżé	adliżrò	adliżia?	adliżêvia?	adliżéjja?	adliżròja?
Té	t adlîż	t adliżêv	t adliżéss	t adliżrè	adliżet?	adliżêvet?	adliżésset?	adliżrèt?
Ló	l adlîż	l adliżêva	l adliżé	l adliżrà	adliżel?	adliżêvel?	adliżéll?	adliżrèl?
Lî	l’adlîż	l’adliżêva	l’adliżé	l’adliżrà	adliżla?	adliżêvla?	adliżélla?	adliżrèla?
Nuèter	adliżän	adliżêven	adliżénn	adliżrän	adliżaggna?	adliżêvgna?	adliżéggna?	adliżraggna?
Vuèter	adliżî	adliżêvi	adliżéssi	adliżrî	adliżîv?	adliżêviv?	adliżéssiv?	adliżrîv?
Låur	i/äl adlîżen	i/äl adliżêven	i/äl adliżénn	i/äl adliżràn	adliżni?	adliżêvni?	adliżénni?	adliżrèni?

Persåṅna	Fåurma afermatîva			Fåurma interugatîva
Persåṅna	Congiuntîv		Condiziunèl	Condiziunèl
Persåṅna	Preṡänt	Pasè	Condiziunèl	Condiziunèl
Mé	ch’ai adlîża	ch’ai adliżéss	ai adliżrêv	adliżréjja?
Té	ch’t adlîż	ch’t adliżéss	t adliżréss	adliżrésset?
Ló	ch’l adlîża	ch’l adliżéss	l adliżrêv	adliżréll?
Lî	ch’l’adlîża	ch’l’adliżéss	l’adliżrêv	adliżrélla?
Nuèter	ch’adliżaggna	ch’adliżéssen	ai adliżrénn	adliżréggna?
Vuèter	ch’adliżèdi	ch’adliżéssi	ai adliżréssi	adliżréssiv?
Låur	ch’i/ch’äli adlîżen	ch’i/ch’äli adliżéssen	i/äli adliżrénn	adliżrénni?

Gerund: adliżànd

Past participle: adlît

Imperative: adlîż (2nd.sg), adliżän (1st.pl), adliżî (2nd.pl)

4th Conjugation (-îr) Finîr
Persåṅna	Fåurma afermatîva				Fåurma interugatîva			
Persåṅna	Preṡänt	Inparfèt	Pasè luntàn	Futûr	Preṡänt	Inparfèt	Pasè luntàn	Futûr
Mé	a finéss	a finêva	a finé	a finirò	finéssia?	finêvia?	finéjja?	finiròja?
Té	et finéss	et finêv	et finéss	et finirè	finésset?	finêvet?	finésset?	finirèt?
Ló	al finéss	al finêva	al finé	al finirà	finéssel?	finêvel?	finéll?	finirèl?
Lî	la finéss	la finêva	la finé	la finirà	finéssela?	finêvla?	finélla?	finirèla?
Nuèter	a finän	a finêven	a finénn	a finirän	finaggna?	finêvgna?	finéggna?	finiraggna?
Vuèter	a finî	a finêvi	a finéssi	a finirî	finîv?	finêviv?	finéssiv?	finirîv?
Låur	i/äl finéssen	i/äl finêven	i/äl finénn	i/äl finiràn	finéssni?	finêvni?	finénni?	finirènni?

Persåṅna	Fåurma afermatîva			Fåurma interugatîva
Persåṅna	Congiuntîv		Condiziunèl	Condiziunèl
Persåṅna	Preṡänt	Pasè	Condiziunèl	Condiziunèl
Mé	ch’a finéssa	ch’a finéss	a finirêv	finiréjja?
Té	ch’et finéss	ch’et finéss	t finiréss	finirésset?
Ló	ch’al finéssa	ch’al finéss	al finirêv	finiréll?
Lî	ch’la finéssa	ch’la finéss	la finirêv	finirélla?
Nuèter	ch’a finaggna	ch’a finéssen	a finirénn	finiréggna?
Vuèter	ch’a finèdi	ch’a finéssi	a finiréssi	finiréssiv?
Låur	ch’i/ch’äl finessen	ch’i/ch’äl finéssen	i/äl finirénn	finirénni?

Gerund: finànd

Past participle: finé

Imperative: finéss (2nd.sg), finän (1st.pl), finî (2nd.pl)

Cognugaziån dal vêrb magnèr

- a mâgn
- t mâgn
- al, la mâgna
- nuèter a magnän
- vuèter a magnè
- låur i mâgnen

Cognugaziån interugatîva dal vêrb magnèr

- mâgna?
- mâgnet?
- mâgnel? mâgnla?
- magnaggna?
- magnèv?
- mâgn-ni?

==== Irregular ====
Persåṅna	-èr				-air				Tôr	-îr		
Persåṅna	Andèr	Fèr	Dèr	Stèr	Savair	Vlair	Psair	Dvair	Tôr	Dîr	Tgnîr	Vgnîr
Mé	a vâg	a fâg	a dâg	a stâg	a sò	a vói	a pos	a dèv	a tói	a dégg	a téggn	a véggn
Té	et vè	et fè	et dè	et stè	et sè	et vû	et pû	et dèv	et tû	et dî	et tén	et vén
Ló/Lî	al/la và	al/la fà	al/la dà	al/la stà	al/la sà	al/la vôl	al/la pôl	al/la dèv	al/la tôl	al/la dîṡ	al/la tén	al/la vén
Nuèter	andän	a fän	a dän	a stän	a savän	a vlän	a pulän	a dvän	a tulän	a dṡän	a tgnän	a vgnän
Vuèter	andè	a fè	a dè	a stè	a savî	a vlî	a pulî	a dvî	a tulî	a dṡî	a tgnî	a vgnî
Låur	i/äl van	i/äl fan	i/äl dan	i/äl stan	i/äl san	i/äl vôlen	i/äl pôlen	i/äl dèv	i/äl tôlen	i/äl dîṡen	i/äl téggnen	i/äl véggnen

Special Cases

- Verbs with infinite form -årr descended from Latin -ōnere and corresponds to Italian -orre. Some verbs in -årr also have alternative forms (dispårr/dispånner, scunpårr/scunpånner, prupårr/prupånner, supårr/supånner).
- Some verbs of the 4th group contained a root that behaves like the verbs of the 3rd group:

Persåṅna	-årr				-îr	
Persåṅna	Cunpårr	Depårr	Dispårr	Prupårr	Durmîr	Murîr
Mé	a cunpånn	a depånn	a dispånn	a prupånn	a dôrum	a môr
Té	t cunpånn	t depånn	t dispånn	t prupånn	t dôrum	t môr
Ló/Lî	al/la cunpånn	al/la depånn	al/la dispånn	al/la prupånn	al/la dôrum	al/la môr
Nuèter	a cunpunän	a depunän	a dispunän	a prupunän	a durmän	a murän
Vuèter	a cunpunî	a depunî	a dispunî	a prupunî	a durmî	a murî
Låur	i/äl cunpånnen	i/äl depånnen	i/äl dispånnen	i/äl prupånnen	i/äl dôrmen	i/äl môren

==== Imperative ====
Imperative form in Bolognese only exists for 1st person singular and 2nd person. Imperative formation:

- For 1st person plural (nó/nuèter) and 2nd person plural (vó/vuèter), it is exactly the same as its present indicative form.
- For 2nd person singular, it is exactly the same as the 3rd person singular present indicative form.

For other pronouns, the subjunctive present forms are used.

Person	Andèr			Tôr			Vgnîr		
Person	Present		Imperative	Present		Imperative	Present		Imperative
Person	Indicative	Subjunctive	Imperative	Indicative	Subjunctive	Imperative	Indicative	Subjunctive	Imperative
Té	t vè	ch’et vâg	và!	t tû tói	ch’et	tôl!	t vén	ch’et véggna	vén!
Ló / Lî	al/la và	ch’al/ch’la vâga	vâga!	al/la tôl	ch’al/ch’la tójja	tójja!	al/la vén	ch’al/ch’la véggna	véggna!
Nuèter	andän	ch’andaggna	andän!	a tulän	ch’a tulaggna	tulän!	a vgnän	ch’a vgnaggna	vgnän!
Vuèter	andè	ch’andèdi	andè!	a tulî	ch’a tulèdi	tulî!	a vgnî	ch’a vgnèdi	vgnî!
Låur	i/äl van	ch’i/ch’äl vâghen	vâghen!	i/äl tôlen	ch’i/ch’äl tôlen	tôlen!	i/äl véggnen	ch’i/ch’äl véggnen	véggnen!

Negative Imperative

For 2nd person singular, there are 3 forms:

1. brîṡa + infinitive

- brîṡa magnèr tròp, a m arcmànd! = non mangiare troppo, mi raccomando!

2. brîṡa stèr a + infinitive

- brîṡa stèr a pasèr da cà! = non passare da casa!

3. an + infinitive + brîṡa

- an magnèr brîṡa tròp! = non mangiare troppo!
- an stèr brîṡa a pasèr da cà! = non passare da casa!

For other pronouns, the subjunctive is used instead:

- an magnaggna brîṡa tròp! = non mangiamo troppo!
- an magnèdi brîṡa tròp! = non mangiate troppo!

==== Reflexive ====
To construct a reflexive verb, the pronoun es is suffixed into the verb. For example, the reflexive of guardèr is guardères or guardèrs. However, for verbs ending in -er, it's replaced by -res. For example: scrîver – scrîvres (scriversi) and vàdder – vàddres (vedersi).

Person	Amanvères				Ciamères			
Person	Present	Negative	Interrogative	Imperative	Present	Negative	Interrogative	Imperative
Mé	a m amànv	a n m amànv brîṡa	m amànvia?		a m ciâm	a n am ciâm brîṡa	am ciâmia?	
Té	t at amànv	t an t amànv brîṡa	t amànvet?	amànvet!	t at ciâm	t an t ciâm brîṡa	at ciâmet?	ciâmet!
Ló	al s amànva	an s amànva brîṡa	s amànvel?	amànves!	a(l) s ciâma	an s ciâma brîṡa	as ciâmel?	ciâmes!
Lî	la s amànva	la n s amànva brîṡa	s amànvla?	amànves!	la s ciâma	la n s ciâma brîṡa	as ciâmla?	ciâmes!
Nuèter	a s amanvän	a n s amanvän brîṡa	s amanvaggna?	amanvans!	a s ciamän	a n s ciamän brîṡa	as ciamaggna?	ciamans!
Vuèter	a v amanvè	a n v amanvè brîṡa	v amanvèv?	amanvèv!	a v ciamè	a n v ciamè brîṡa	av ciamèv?	ciamèv!
Låur	i/äl s amànven	i/äl n s amànven brîṡa	s amànvni?	amànvens!	i/äl s ciâm	i/äl n s ciâm brîṡa	as ciâmni?	ciâms!

Negation

- an s pôl brîṡa avair = non si può avere
- an s i vadd lómm = non si vede niente
- an s fà es an s fécca = non si fà e non si fìcca
- cum an s arêv brîṡa da fèr a tradûṡer = come non si dovrebbe tradurre
- an s trâta brîṡa d èser di rumântic = non si tratta di essere dei romantici
- quand an s psêva brîṡa al dromedèri dscårrer pió cèr = quando non si poteva essere più espliciti
- sänz’âcua an s mèṡna e sänza bavvr an s mâgna = senz’acqua non si macina e senza bere non si mangia

==== Past Participle ====
Regular
Past Participle		-èr			-air			-er			-îr		
Past Participle		Andèr	Magnèr	Druvèr	Vlair	Psair	Savair	Cgnósser	Cràdder	Sénter	Partîr	Guarîr	Frîr
Singular	Masculine	andè	magnè	druvè	vló	psó	savó	cgnusó	cardó	sintó	parté	guaré	fré
Singular	Feminine	andèda	magnèda	druvèda	vlûda	psûda	savûda	cgnusûda	cardûda	sintûda	partîda	guarîda	frîda
Plural	Masculine	andè	magnè	druvè	vló	psó	savó	cgnusó	cardó	sintó	parté	guaré	fré
Plural	Feminine	andèdi	magnèdi	druvèdi	vlûdi	psûdi	savûdi	cgnusûdi	cardûdi	sintûdi	partîdi	guarîdi	frîdi

Past participle is formed using the stem of the verb with unstressed vowel (for example on regular conjugation for 1st person plural). In Bolognese, ONLY the masculine singular form is used for all declension since the past participle of the verbs end in a stressed vowel, the form does not change in the feminine nor plural. However, in the countryside, for example in western and northern province, the feminine and plural form can still be found.

The Italian past participle suffix -ato, -uto, -ito generally correspond to the Bolognese -è, -ó, -é respectively. Notable examples include the verb vgnîr (venire) which has the past participle form of vgnó (venuto) and èser (essere) with stè (stato). Irregular forms of verbs fèr, parair, tôr, córrer, adlîżer, dezîder, dîr with past participle such as fât, pèrs, tôlt, cåurs, adlît, dezîṡ, détt forms the feminine form by suffixing -a at the end of the word becoming fâta, pèrsa, tôlta, cåursa, adlîta, dezîṡa, détta and suffixing -i for feminine plural.

=== Adverb ===
==== Modo ====
bän (bene), cómm (come), acsé (così), mèl (male), giósst (giusto), mé (meglio), insàmm (insieme), pîz (peggio)

==== Tempo ====
incû (oggi), ajîr (ieri), dman (domani), åura (ora), adès (adesso), dåpp (dopo), bèle (già), mâi (mai), sänper (sempre), spass (spesso), sóbbit (subito), allåura (allora), anc (ancora), ed nôv (di nuovo)

Complex time expressions

- adès ch’é pôc (poco fa)
- da st’åura (a quest’ora)
- da sti dé (in questi giorni)
- d’ed qué a dû ân (tra due anni)
- d’incû e òt (tra una settimana)
- in st mumänt / int al mumänt d adès (in questo momento)
- par l urdinèri (di solito)
- pr al pasè (in passato)
- pasè pôc (fra poco / poco dopo)
- tótt int un mumänt (all’improvviso)
- in cal mänter / in st mänter (mentre)

==== Luogo ====
là (là), lé (lì), qué (qui), dóvv (dove), såtta (sotto), żå (giù), såuvra (sopra), fòra (fuori), dänter (dentro), foravî / fòra d vî (altrove), dnanz (davanti), drî (dietro), luntàn (lontano)

==== Quantità ====
tant (tanto), pôc (poco), magâra (molto), gnént (niente), manc (meno), pió (più), quant (quanto), quèṡi (quasi), almànc (almeno)

==== Interrogativi ====
quand? (quando?), quant? (quanto?), cum? (come?), csa? (cosa?), quèl? (quale?), parché? (perché?), dóvv? (dove?)

==== Affermazione, Negazione, e Dubbio ====
chisà (chissà), fôrsi (forse), bèle / żà (già), se (se), an (non), nå / nécca (no), sé / ói (sì)

Affirmative Adverb Usage

A. Direct Interrogative

ÓI < Latin: *hoc illud (est) “quello (è)”

- Ît stè té? - Ói. = Sei stato tu? - Sì.
- T an arè mégga magnè tótti äl tajadèl? - Ói. = Non avrai mica mangiato tutte le tagliatelle? – Sì

SÉ < Latin: *sic (est) “così (è)”

- Ît stè té? - Sé. = Sei stato tu? - Sì
- T an arè mégga magnè tótti äl tajadèl? - Sé. = Non avrai mica mangiato tutte le tagliatelle? - Sì

B. Indirect Interrogative

SÉ

- La m à détt ed sé. = Mi ha detto di sì.

C. Intensifier

Reduplication of the affirmative adverb carries the meaning of "but of course!" or "Certainly!"

- sé sé! ói ói!

There are other affirmative adverbs which function as intensifier:

- Ói bän!
- Quall s intànnd!
- Soncamé!
- As capéss!
- Mo sicûra!

=== Numeral ===
Zéffra	Cardinal / Cardnèl		Ordinal / Urdnèl	
0	żèr - żêro		an i é brîṡa -	
1	ón (♂)	óṅna (♀)	prémm (♂)	prémma (♀)
2	dû (♂)	dåu (♀)	secånnd (♂)	secånnda (♀)
3	trî (♂)	trai (♀)	têrz (♂)	têrza (♀)
4	quâter		quèrt (♂)	quèrta (♀)
5	zénc(v)		quént (♂)	quénta (♀)
6	sî		sèst (♂)	sèsta (♀)
7	sèt		sètum (♂)	sètma (♀)
8	òt		utèv (♂)	utèva (♀)
9	nôv		nôn (♂)	nôna (♀)
10	dîṡ		dêzum (♂)	dêzma (♀)

Note the difference between article and pronoun for (ón/un), no distinction exist for other numerals:

Example	Bolognese	Italian	English
Article	ai é un òmen	c’è un uomo	there's a man
Article	ai é una dòna	c’è una donna	there's a woman
Pronoun	ai n é ón	ce n’è uno	there's one (m)
Pronoun	ai n é ónna	ce n’è una	there's one (f)
dû / dåu	ai é dû cavâl	ci sono due cavalli	there are two horses (m)
dû / dåu	ai é dåu cavâli	ci sono due cavalle	there are two horses (f)
trî / trai	ai é trî gât	ci sono tre gatti	there are three cats (m)
trî / trai	ai é trai gâti	ci sono tre gatte	there are three cats (f)

For numbers higher than 10, the ordinal is formed by adding quall di before the cardinal numeral. For example: Eleven (ónng’) has the ordinal form of Eleventh (quall di ónng’)

Cardinal		Cardinal		Cardinal		Cardinal	
11	ónng’	21	ventión			100	zänt
12	dågg’	22	ventedû	20	vént	200	duṡänt
13	tragg’	23	ventetrî	30	tränta	300	tarṡänt
14	quatôrg’	24	ventquâter	40	quaranta	400	quaterzänt
15	quénng’	25	ventzénc	50	zincuanta	500	zenczänt
16	sagg’	26	ventsî	60	s-santa	600	sizänt
17	darsèt	27	ventsèt	70	stanta	700	setzänt
18	dṡdòt	28	ventiôt	80	utanta	800	otzänt
19	dṡnôv	29	ventnôv	90	nuvanta	900	novzänt

Higher numbers:

- 1000: méll (m) mélla (f)
- 1000000: un migliån
- 1000000000: un miglièrd

Construction:

- 66 = 60 + 6

s-santa + sî = s-santsî (without space)

- 739 = 700 + 30 + 9

setzänt + tränta + nôv = setzänt-träntanôv

- 2000 women

dåu mélla dòn

=== Syntax ===
a n t al dâg brîṡa = non te lo do

ch'an t véggna = che tu non venga

==== Negation ====
Bolognese dialect, similar to French, uses double negation usually with the particle (a)n before the verb and the word brîṡa after the verb. For verbs beginning with a consonant:

- For 3rd person singular masculine: al + an becomes an
- For 3rd person plural feminine: the 3rd person plural masculine clitic pronoun i is used instead.

Persåṅna	Èser	Avair	Cantèr
Mé	a n sån brîṡa	a n ò brîṡa	a n cant brîṡa
Té	t an î brîṡa	t an è brîṡa	t an cant brîṡa
Ló	al n é brîṡa	al n à brîṡa	an canta brîṡa
Lî	la n é brîṡa	la n à brîṡa	la n canta brîṡa
Nuèter	a n sän brîṡa	a n avän brîṡa	a n cantän brîṡa
Vuèter	a n sî brîṡa	a n avî brîṡa	a n cantè brîṡa
Låur	i n én brîṡa	i n an brîṡa	i n cànten brîṡa
Låur	äl n én brîṡa	äl n an brîṡa	i n cànten brîṡa

Other negation particles include:

- brîṡa (non): a n l ò brîṡa vésst = non l’ho visto
- mégga (mica): a n sån mégga stè mé! = non sono mica stato io!
- mâi (mai): al n à mâi sånn = non ha mai sonno
- pió (più): a n l ò pió vésst = non l’ho più visto
- gnínta (niente): a n avän gnínta da dîr = non abbiamo niente da dire
- inción (nessuno): an i é inción = non c’è nessuno
- gnanc (neanche / non ancora): al n à gnanc un góbbi = non ha neanche un soldo

==== Dative construction ====
Person	Bolognese	Italian
Mé	am pèr d andèr int i mât	mi sembra di diventare matto
Té	at pèr d èser vgnó mègher	ti sembra di essere dimagrito
Ló / Lî	ai pèr d èsr a pòst	gli / le sembra di essere a posto
Nuèter	as pèr d avair la vétta par dnanz	ci sembra di avere la vita davanti
Vuèter	av pèr ed turnèr a nâser	vi sembra di rinascere
Låur	ai pèr ed magnèr tròp	a loro sembra di mangiar troppo

The real subject is a complement of the term -> verb always conjugated in the 3rd person singular, even if the real subject is plural:

Person	Bolognese	Italian
Mé	a mé am pièṡ al bulgnaiṡ	a me piace il bolognese
Mé	a mé am pièṡ i pizón	a me piacciono i piccioni
Té	a té at vôl na vacanza	a te serve una vacanza
Té	a té at vôl di bajûc	a te servono soldi
Ló / Lî	a lî ai é capitè un bèl fât	a lei è successa una bella cosa
Ló / Lî	a lî ai é capitè di bî fât	a lei sono successe belle cose

==== Soggetto Fittizio ====
When in a sentence the subject of the 3rd person is moved after the verb, the soggetto fittizio ai is always used in the singular. (subject + verb) mî mèder l’arîva = (verb + subject) ai arîva mî mèder

Example:

- äl mî amîghi äli én vgnó = le mie amiche sono venute
- ai é vgnó äl mî amîghi = sono venute le mie amiche
- ai vén äl mî amîghi = vengono le mie amiche

Used with verb of motion:

- ai tåurna sô fiôl = torna suo figlio
- ai arîva sô maré = arriva suo marito

Used with intransitive verbs or used as such when introducing a new subject:

- ai é nèd i dû gemî dla Marî e d Pèvel = sono nati i due gemelli di Maria e Paolo
- ai vôl i bichîr = servono i bicchieri
- ai tîra al vänt = tira il vento
- incû ai żûga al Bulåggna = oggi gioca il Bologna

It is not used if the subject has already been introduced in the conversation:

Example 1:

- chi arîva? tô pèder? = chi arriva? tuo padre?
- sé, ai riva mî pèder = sì, arriva mio padre
- arîvel o nå tô pèder? = arriva o no tuo padre?
- sé, l rîva, mî pèder = sì, arriva, mio padre

Example 2:

- Chi żûga incû? = Chi gioca oggi?
- Incû ai żûga al Bulåggna. = Oggi gioca il Bologna.
- L é bèle tèrd! Mo żûghel o nå, ste Bulåggna? = E’ già tardi! Ma gioca o no, il Bologna?
- Sé, al żûga, al Bulåggna: èvet pazénzia! = Sì, gioca, il Bologna: abbi pazienza!

It is also used with atmospheric verbs:

- al piôv = piove
- al tinpèsta = grandina
- al naiva = nevica
- al sfarósscla = iniziano a scendere piccoli fiocchi di neve [prov. Est al sfalésstra]
- al tråṅna = tuona
- al ṡlôṡna = lampeggia [la ṡluṡnè il lampo]

Using ai with negation:

- ai n arîva inción = non arriva nessuno
- ai n suzêd gnínto = non succede nulla

Using ai in interrogative sentence (no interrogative pronouns necessary):

Example 1:

- ai arîva sô mèder = arriva sua madre
- i arîva sô mèder? = arriva sua madre?

Example 2:

- ai vén la Pèvla e la Giógglia = vengono la Paola e la Giulia
- i vén la Pèvla e la Giógglia? = vengono la Paola e la Giulia?

==== Adverb of Place "i" ====
Equivalent to Italian ci. In the western area (mountains and plains, e.g. Lizzano in Belvedere, Castello di Serravalle, San Giovanni in Persiceto) and northern area (e.g. Pieve di Cento, Galliera) “g” is used instead of "i" in continuity with Modenese and Ferrarese [a g vâg, t ig vè, al g và, etc.]

Person	Positive	Negative
Mé	a i vâg	a n i vâg brîṡa
Té	t i vè	t an i vè brîṡa
Ló	al i và	al n i và brîṡa
Lî	la i và	la n i và brîṡa
Nuèter	a i andän	a n i andän brîṡa
Vuèter	a i andè	a n i andè brîṡa
Låur	i i van	i n i van brîṡa
Låur	äl i van	äl n i van brîṡa

==== Special Cases ====
ecco + noun (declension) = (vít)tal (declension) + adverb of distance (qué, lé, là) + noun (declension)

Pronoun		Here's / There's		Examples	
Singular	Masculine	(vít)tal qué, lé, là	eccolo	(vít)tal là, sô fiôl	ecco suo figlio
Singular	Feminine	(vít)tla qué, lé, là	eccola	(vít)tla qué, la mî biziclatta	ecco la mia bicicletta
Plural	Masculine	(vít)ti qué, lé, là	eccoli	(vít)ti lé, i ragazû	ecco i bambini
Plural	Feminine	(vít)tli qué, lé, là	eccole	(vít)tli qué, äl fórrbṡ	ecco le forbici

dovere (conjugated) + verb

1. avair (conjugated) + da + verb

- t è da savair = devi sapere
- ai ò da lavurèr = devo lavorare
- ai arêv da magnèr manc = dovrei mangiare meno

2. tgnîr (conjugated) + verb

- a tgnän lavurèr = dobbiamo lavorare
- a téggn andèr a fèr la spaiṡa = devo andare a far la spesa

3. dative pronoun + tuchèr (conjugated) + (e)d + verb (experiencing an external event)

- a m tåcca ed lavurèr ala nòt = devo lavorare di notte
- an s tucarà brîṡa d lavurèr al dåppi = non dovrà lavorare il doppio

stare (conjugated) + verb (gerund)

1. èser (conjugated) + drî a + verb (infinitive)

- l é drî a andèr = sta andando
- a sån anc drî a fèr = sto ancora facendo

2. èser (conjugated) + drî che + verb (indicative)

- a sån drî ch’a mâgn = sto mangiando
- i én drî ch’i arîven = stanno arrivando

3. stare (conjugated) + per + verb (infinitive) = èser (conjugated) + drî par + verb (infinitive)

- i én drî pr arivèr = stanno per arrivare
- a sån drî par magnèr = sto per mangiare

nessuno = inción

1. as adjective: inción takes a plural form inción (masculine) or inciónni (feminine).

- a n ò cunprè inción fiûr = non ho comprato nessun fiore
- a n ò vésst inciónni dòn = non ho visto nessuna donna

2. as pronoun after a verb: inción takes a plural form.

- i n capéssen gnînta inción = non capisce niente nessuno
- ed cäl biziclàtt lé, i n in vôlen inciónni = di quelle biciclette, non ne vogliono nessuna

3. as pronoun preceding a verb: inción takes a singular form. Clitic pronouns are not required.

- inción capéss gnínta = nessuno capisce niente
- inción in vôl = non ne vuole nessuno

Anc, gnanc = anche / ancora, neanche / non ancora

1. Gnanc replaces anc on negative sentences.

- ai ò anc da magnèr = devo ancora mangiare
- a n ò gnanc da magnèr = non devo ancora mangiare
- Pèvel l é anc arivè a cà = Paolo è ancora arrivato a casa
- Pèvel al n é gnanc arivè a cà = Paolo non è ancora arrivato a casa
- l à anc un góbbi = ha anche un soldo
- al n à gnanc un góbbi = non ha neanche un soldo

2. anc and gnanc becomes anca and gnanca in front of personal pronouns with the exception of nuèter and vuèter.

- anca / gnanca mé = anche/neanche io
- anca / gnanca té = anche/neanche tu
- anca / gnanca ló/lî = anche/neanche = lui / lei
- anc / gnanc nuèter = anche/neanche noi
- anc / gnanc vuèter = anche/neanche voi
- anca / gnanca låur = anche/neanche loro

dove = dóvv or duv

1. Before verbs = duv

- duv êla? = Dov’è?
- in duv vèt? = Dove vai?

2. Elsewhere = dóvv

- in dóvv? = Dove?

come = cómm or cum

1. Before verbs = cum

- cum êla? = come mai?
- cum vèla? = come va?
- cum stèt? = come stai?

2. Elsewhere = cómm

- mo cómm? = ma come?

pronoun + verb + da solo = pronoun + verb + da par + pronoun

- mé a m difànd da par mé = io mi difendo da solo
- té t và al cínnema da par té = tu vai al cinema da solo
- biṡåggna fèr tótt da pr as = bisogna fare tutto da soli

The conjunction es indicates contemporaneity or coordination between two actions. It is used between two verbs conjugated with the same subject, instead of e, with the meaning of "and moreover".

- al piôv es ai é al såul = piove e c'è il sole
- a rédd es a zîg = rido e piango
- l é un èṡen es vôl fèr al fûrb = è un asino e vuol fare il furbo

The adverb mò is used as an exhortative particle, in an urging manner.

- ciâpa mò la mâchina! = prendi l’auto!
- pruvän mò ed stèr chiêt! = proviamo a stare calmi!
- tulî mò żå äl tajadèl! = prendete nel piatto le tagliatelle!
- siêdi mò cuntént! = siate contenti!
- stè mò da sénter! = state a sentire!

== Example ==
Lord's Prayer
Bolognese	Italian
Pèder nòster,	Padre nostro,
ch't î int al zîl,	Che sei nei cieli,
ch'al séppa santifichè al tô nómm,	Sia santificato il tuo nome,
ch'ai véggna al tô raggn,	Venga il tuo regno,
ch'ai séppa fâta la tô volontè,	Sia fatta la tua volontà,
cómm in zîl, acsé anc in tèra.	Come in cielo, così in terra.
Dâs incû al nòster pan d ògni dé,	Dacci oggi il nostro pane quotidiano,
e dscanzèla i nûster dèbet,	E rimetti a noi i nostri debiti,
cme nuèter a i dscanzlän ai nûster debitûr,	Come noi li rimettiamo ai nostri debitori,
e brîṡa lasèr ch'a cascaggna in tentaziån,	E non ci indurre in tentazione,
mo lébbres dal mèl. Âmen.	Ma liberaci dal male. Amen.
