= Sillaro =

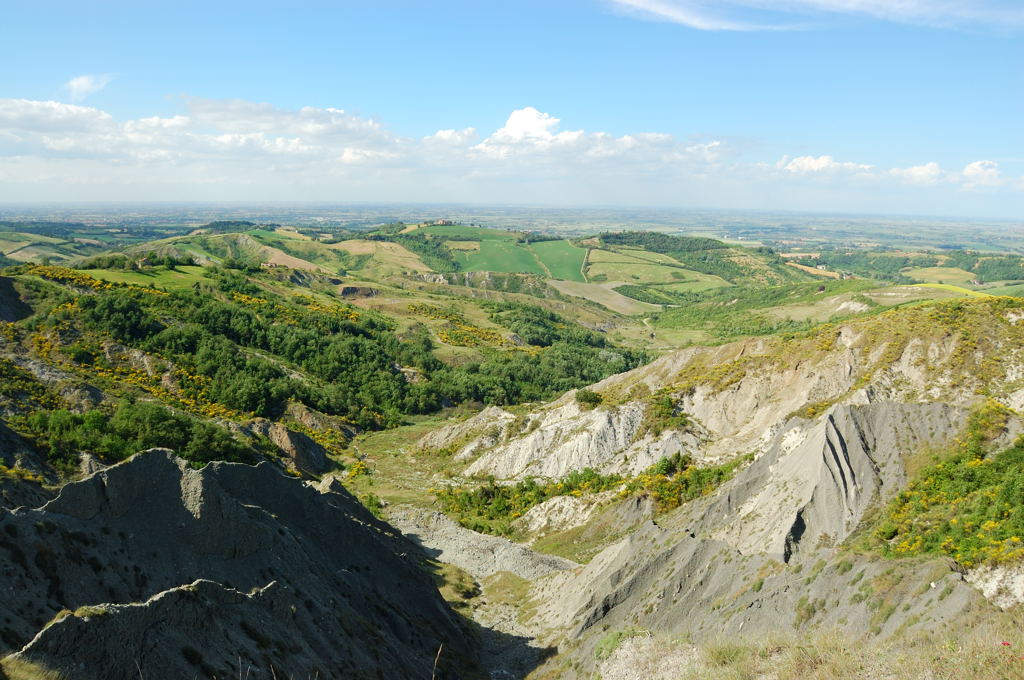
- Sillaro descending towards the Po valley

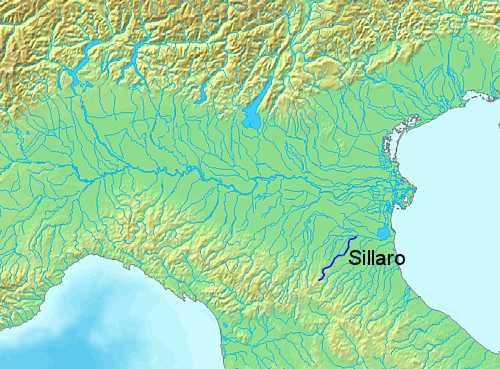
- Location of the Sillaro in Italy

Location
- Country: Italy

Physical characteristics
- Source
  - location: Sasso di San Zenobi, Tuscany
  - elevation: about 800 m (2,600 ft) above sea level
- Mouth: Reno
  - location: Emilia-Romagna
  - coordinates: 44.5786°N 11.8714°E
  - elevation: 14 m (46 ft) above sea level
- Length: 66 km (41 mi)
- Basin size: about 300 km^{2} (120 mi^{2})
- Discharge
  - average: 4 m^{3}/s (140 cu ft/s)

Basin features
- Progression: Reno→ Adriatic Sea

The Sillaro (Emilian: Sàrrel; Romagnol: Sélar; Latin: Silarus) is a 66-kilometre (41 mi) long Italian stream, whose headwaters are by the village of Piancaldoli, Province of Florence, in Tuscany. It runs northeast through the city of Castel San Pietro Terme, Province of Bologna, in Emilia-Romagna. The river runs through a short extension of the province of Ravenna extending into the Province of Bologna before re-entering the Province of Bologna. It then forms the border between the Province of Ferrara and the Province of Ravenna for a short distance before entering the Province of Ferrara. The river ends as a tributary of the Reno River by the village of San Biagio di Argenta and near where the Idice enters the Reno. Historically, its course formed the boundary between Emilia and Romagna.
