= Bargi hydroelectric power station =

Hydroelectric power station in jablpur, Madhya Pradesh, India

Bargi hydroelectric power station (Italian: Centrale idroelettrica di Bargi) is a hydroelectric power station in the north-central part of Italy, in the Emilia-Romagna region. The power station is located in Bargi, one of the villages around Lake Suviana lying upstream, in Camugnano near Bologna. It uses reservoirs created in the confluence of two right tributaries of the river Reno, which flows into the Adriatic Sea north of Ravenna). It is owned by Enel Green Power.

Back in 1911, the Brasimone reservoir with a volume of 6.4 million cubic metres was created with the help of a 40-meter high brick dam. It was located on the stream of the same name, which flows from the left into the Setta River (the right tributary of the Reno), and fed the Santa Maria power plant.

And in 1932, to the west of the Setta watershed, on the Limentra di Treppio river (another right tributary of Reno), the Suviana reservoir was built, originally intended only to feed its own hydroelectric power plant with a capacity of 27 MW. The 96-meter-high and 225-meter-long gravity dam built here, which required 288,000 m3 of material, holds a reservoir with a volume of 46.7 million m3 (useful volume 43.9 million m3). It can be noted that, in addition to the direct flow, an additional resource comes to this reservoir from the western direction - from the Pavana reservoir on the Limentra di Sambuca (another right tributary of Reno) and from the Molino del Pallone water intake dam on Reno itself.

Due to increased energy demand, the Bargi hydroelectric power station was built in 1975 at a depth of 30 metres. The power plant uses water from both Lake Suviana and Lake Brasimone.

== 2024 explosion ==
Bargi hydroelectric power station
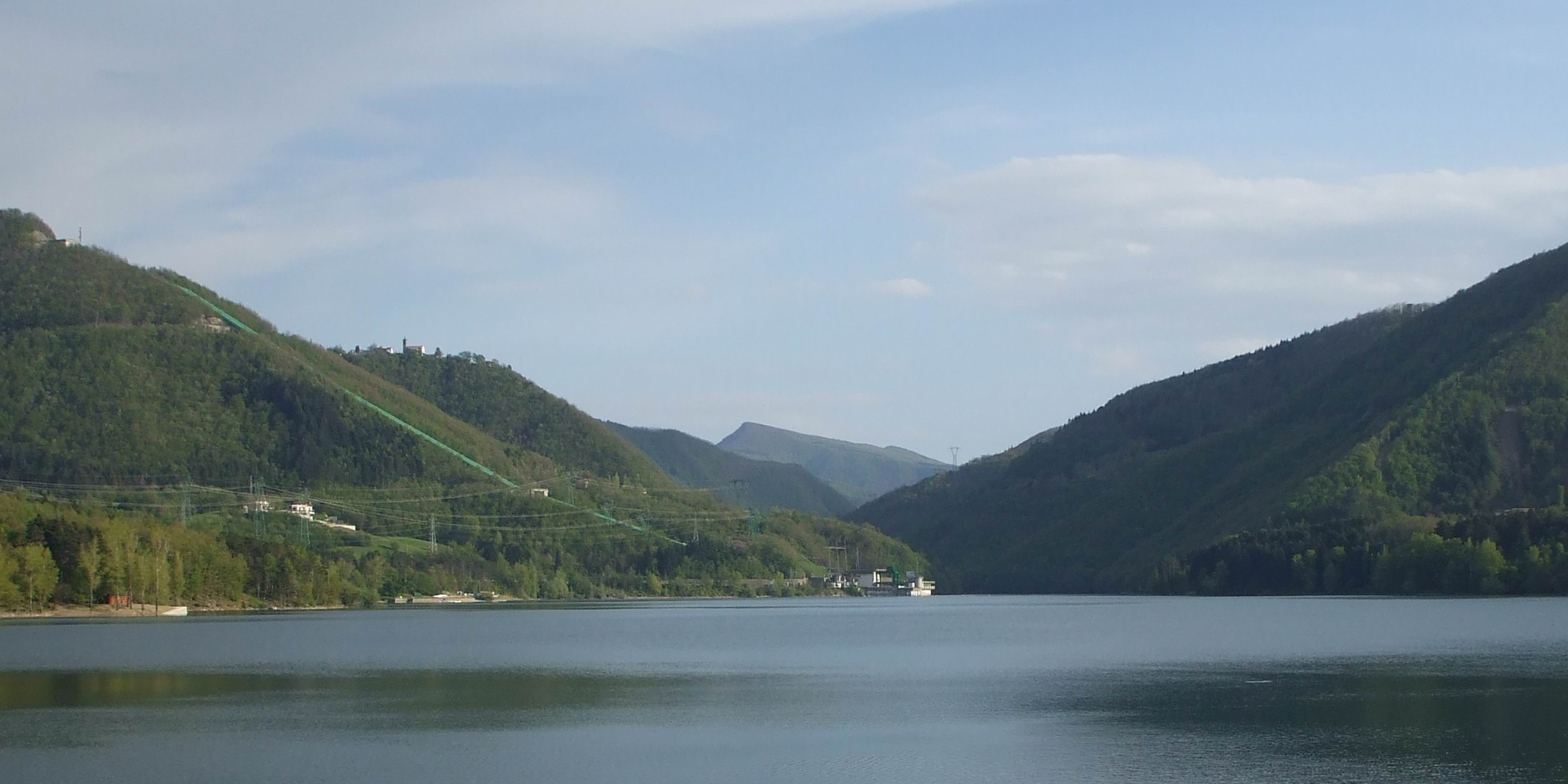
- Lake Suviana in front of the Bargi hydroelectric power station in 2008
- Date: April 9, 2024
- Location: Bargi, Camugnano, Italy; 44.11674504°N 11.04307383°E
- Type: Explosion
- Deaths: 7
- Injuries: 5

On April 9, 2024, an explosion at the power plant left seven workers dead and five others critically injured. The explosion occurred around 15:00 CEST at the power plant. The power plant is located about 30 metres (98 ft) underground. The prefect of Bologna, Attilio Visconti, said the explosion originated from a turbine located eight levels down and resulted in a fire, and the floor below it flooded. Enel Green Power said there was no damage to the dam's structure.

=== Victims ===
Fifteen people were working at the plant at the time of the explosion. In the immediate aftermath, three workers were killed, including two from the southern cities of Taranto and Messina and a man from Romania who resided in Settimo Torinese. Five people were critically injured with severe burns; they were transported by helicopter to nearby hospitals. Two people are in intensive care. Four workers were declared missing. Three other workers escaped unharmed.

On April 10, aquatic drones were deployed in the lake to search for the missing. The next day, three of the missing were found dead, bringing the death toll to six. The men were from Padua, Milan and Pisa. On the morning of April 12, the last missing worker, a man from Naples, was found dead, bringing the death toll to seven.

The fire brigade had great difficulty gaining access to the fire. A rescue diver gained access to the seventh floor below the surface, but not lower where three people were trapped.

Employees were evacuated following the explosion and electricity production was halted.

=== Strikes and protests ===
The explosion contributed to concerns about work safety in Italy, with two of the country's largest unions renewing calls for planned nationwide four hour-strikes on April 10. Following the explosion, more strikes and protests took place on April 11.

=== Investigation ===
Authorities said the explosion appeared to have been caused by a defect in one of the turbines. According to Marco Masinara, the mayor of Camugnano, the explosion occurred during maintenance work. An investigation is due to launched after the missing people are found and the plant is deemed safe.

On April 10, Masinara said the plant was never known to be at risk of such an incident.

More than two years before the explosion, the Italian Labour Union issued warnings about safety risks in the hydroelectric power station. However, Enel Energy denied such reports and said that it had received appreciation from labor unions in 2022 for the company's approach to training, safety, and risk assessment.

=== Reactions ===
Italian prime minister Giorgia Meloni said she was "anxiously" following the news and thanked the rescue workers. Enel Green Power also expressed its condolences to the families of the victims and has established an immediate fund of two million euros to enable the individuals involved and their families to address their immediate needs and emergencies. The company also initiated an internal fundraising campaign to provide employees with the opportunity to express their condolences and solidarity with the families of the victims.

On April 10, the explosion was commemorated by the Italian Chamber of Deputies.

== See also ==
- Basin of Pavana
