= Basin of Pavana =

Artificial body of Water in Tuscany, Italy

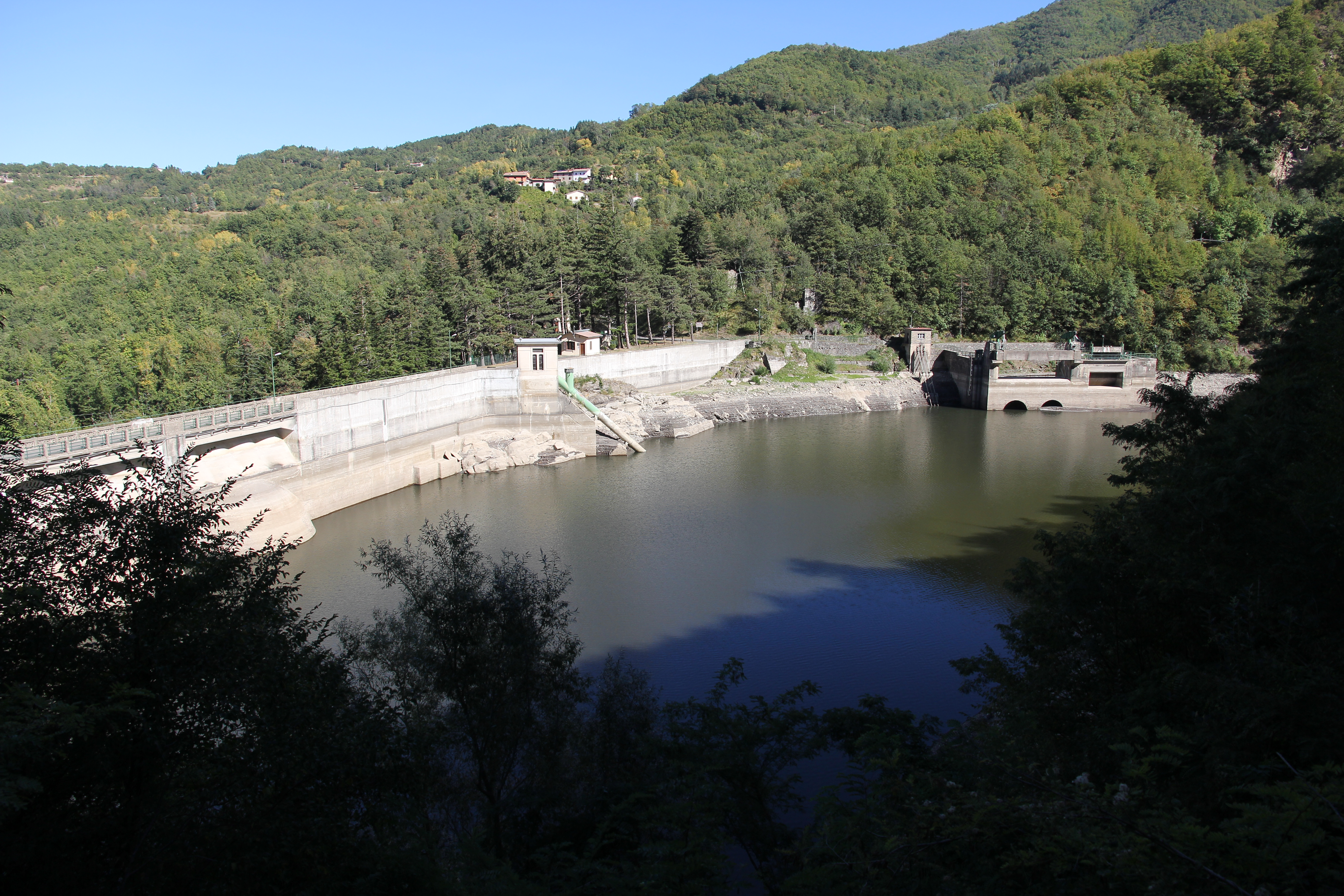
- Sambuca Pistoiese, Pavana reservoir and dam
- Location: Tuscany and Emilia-Romagna Region; Pistoia and Bologna Province, Italy
- Coordinates: 44°7′7.4″N 11°0′12.62″E
- Primary inflows: western Limentra stream
- Primary outflows: western Limentra stream
- Max. length: 1.04 km (0.65 mi)
- Max. width: 0.08 km (0.050 mi)
- Water volume: 0.0009 km^{3} (730 acre⋅ft)
- Surface elevation: 4,725 m (15,502 ft)

Location
- Interactive map of Basin of Pavana

The Basin of Pavana is a small artificial lake in Italy in the Tuscan-Emilian Apennines, located in the province of Pistoia on the border with that of Bologna.

== Description ==
The Pàvana reservoir, named after the hamlet of the same name in the scattered municipality of Sambuca Pistoiese, was built in 1925 by the State Railways through a 54-m-high, multiple-arch, reinforced concrete dam. The reservoir collects part of the waters of the upper Reno via the Limentra di Sambuca tributary and 2,691 m. underground tunnel that conveys to it the waters of the Reno collected in the Molino del Pallone reservoir.

The basin then discharges via underground conduit its waters into the much larger Suviana Lake, which was completed in 1935 and where a hydroelectric power plant was built primarily to electrically power the Porrettana railway. Compared to the four artificial reservoirs built (the others being Lake Brasimone and the small Lake Santa Maria), the Pàvana reservoir is the smallest in volume and surface area.

The basin is formed by the Limentra di Sambuca (or Western Limentra) stream, which is also its emissary and flows a few kilometers later into the Reno River; the left bank belongs to Tuscany (municipality of Sambuca Pistoiese) while the right bank marks the region's border with Emilia-Romagna. Moreover, on its right bank the Suviana and Brasimone Lakes Regional Park ends, so the Pavana reservoir marks its border, although it is not part of it.

The very recessed location at the bottom of a narrow valley has so far prevented adequate tourist exploitation of the lake, which is also a destination for hikers and fishermen.

== See also ==
- Suviana and Brasimone lakes regional park
- Tuscany
- Emilia-Romagna
