= Rocchetta Mattei =

Fortress in Bologna, Italy

Coordinates: 44.223633°N 11.059922°E

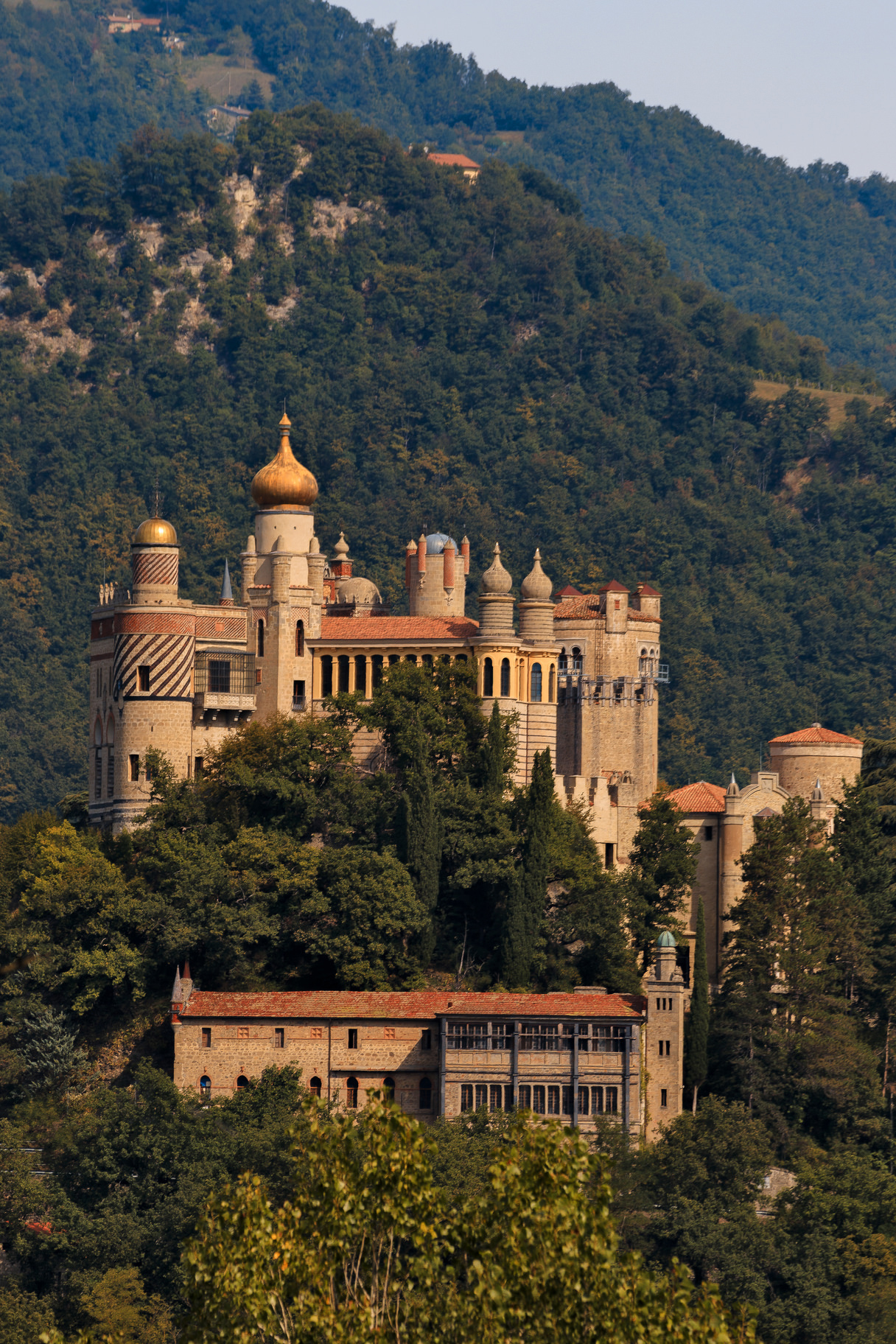
Rocchetta Mattei

Rocchetta Mattei is a fortress located on the Northern Apennine Mountains, on a hill which is 407 meters above sea level, in the locality of Savignano in the municipality of Grizzana Morandi, on the Strada Statale 64 Porrettana, in the Metropolitan City of Bologna.

Built in the second half of nineteenth century, it blends various eclectic styles, from Medieval to Moorish.

== History ==
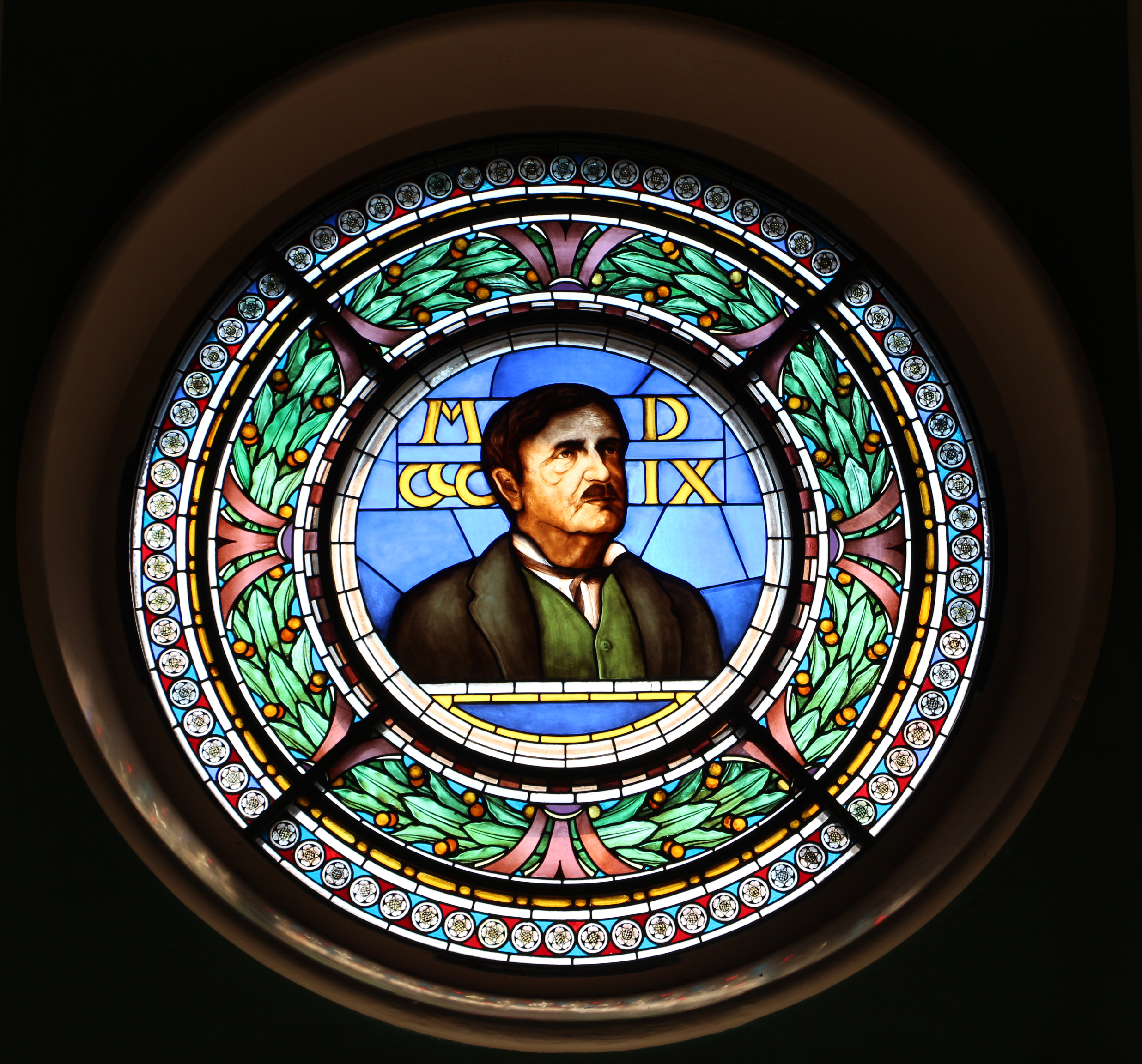
Count Cesare Mattei

Rocchetta Mattei was the home of count Cesare Mattei, a scholar, politician and self-taught physician who founded electrohomeopathy, a practice founded on homeopathy.

On November 5, 1850, the first stone of Rocchetta Mattei was laid, and as early as 1859 it became habitable and eventually Cesare Mattei’s permanent residence. Inside Rocchetta Mattei, the count led a life as a medieval castellan and even created a court, complete with a buffoon.

The castle hosted illustrious individuals who came from everywhere to undergo Mattei's treatment, including Ludwig III of Bavaria and Alexander II of Russia. In 1925, there was an official visit by the Prince of Piedmont. Even Fyodor Dostoevsky quotes the Count in The Brothers Karamazov, when he tells the devil he managed to recover from terrible rheumatism thanks to a book and some drops from Count Mattei.

=== After World War II ===
During World War II, German troops damaged the interior of the building. When the conflict was over, the last heir, Iris Boriani, was unable to sell the building, and offered it free to the Municipality of Bologna, but they did not accept the donation.

In 1959, Rocchetta Mattei was purchased by Primo Stefanelli. He transformed one of the smaller buildings, already used as a hunting pavilion, into a cozy hotel with an adjoining restaurant. The restaurant accessed an adjacent shady park, creating an oasis of peace and serenity.

Stefanelli wanted to repair the damage and restore the castle to its original condition and make it a prime tourist destination.

In 1989, Stefanelli died and the situation deteriorated; due to various problems, Rocchetta Mattei was definitively closed to the public.

In 1997, a committee was created for the preservation of the castle which, in the face of total abandonment by the owners and government institutions, seemed destined to ruin. Many initiatives were launched, such as a human chain around Rocchetta Mattei and conferences and debates, which were very successful.

In 2000, a museum was established about Count Cesare Mattei, the Rocchetta Mattei, and electrohomeopathy on Via Nazionale 117 in Riola di Vergato, seat of the Committee "Archivio Museo Cesare Mattei". It continues in the present day collecting historical things relating to the life of Count Cesare Mattei.

In 2006, the foundation of Cassa di Risparmio in Bologna officially announced the acquisition of Rocchetta Mattei, restored it, which ultimately led to the reopening to the public on August 9, 2015.

== Description ==
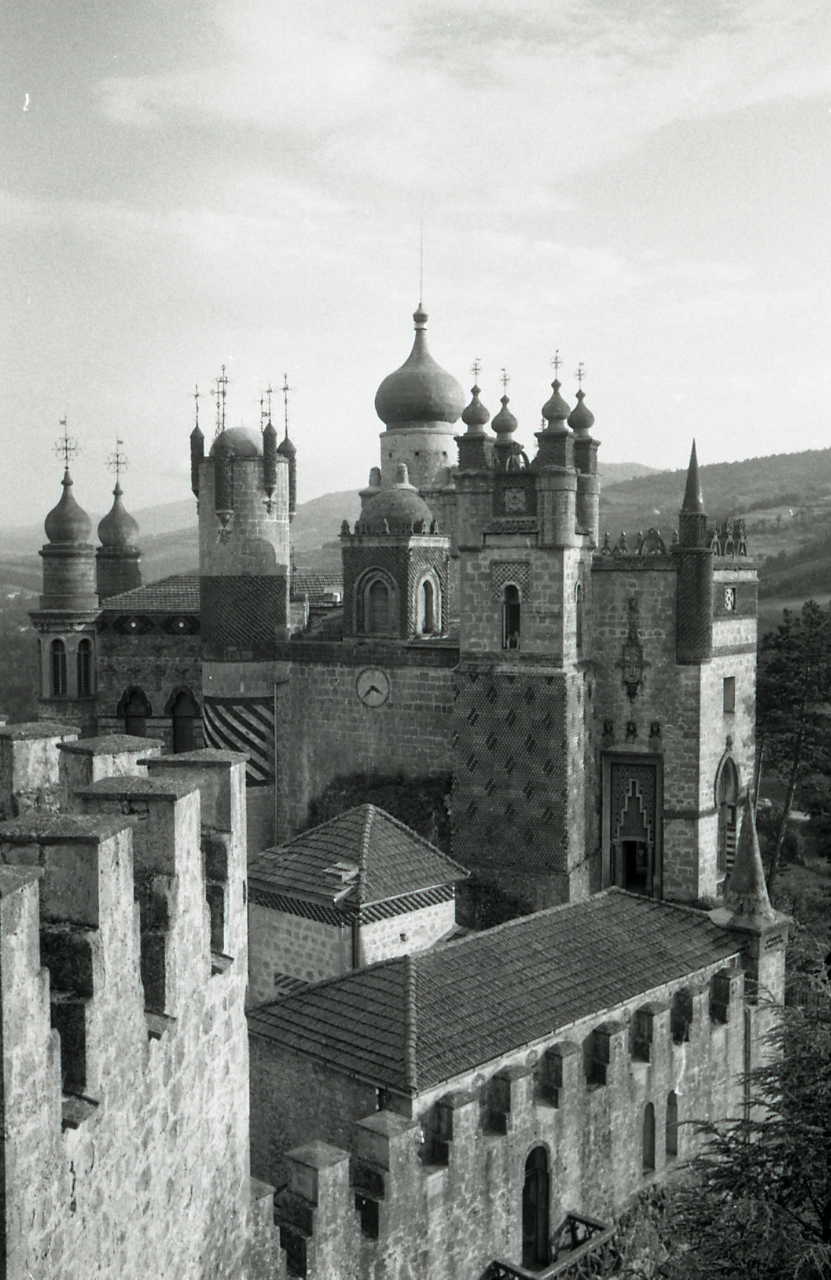
The castle photographed by Paolo Monti in 1956

The set of buildings that make up the present castle was located on a medieval complex, which belonged to the emperors Frederick I and Otto IV and the domain of Matilda of Tuscany, who held a vassal, Lanfranco da Savignano, as guardian. The need to defend the passage on the Rhine made this castle precious to the rulers of the time. Having fallen into the hands of the Bolognese, and created a more advanced defensive line, the fortress became useless and was destroyed in 1293.

Before choosing Savignano for its castle, it seems that Cesare Mattei had visited several places. The place was preferred for many reasons: the ease of access, the rock forming a gigantic natural pedestal, and the location on the confluence of the rivers Limentra orientale and Reno. The predominant style of the building is Moorish, with additional medieval and modern Italian architecture.

The main entrance opens onto a branch of highway 64. An inscription at the top commemorates the origin and completion of the building with the following words:

"Il Conte Cesare Mattei - sopra le rovine di antica rocca - edificò questo castello dove visse XXV anni - benefico ai poveri - assiduamente studioso - delle virtù mediche dell'erbe - per la qual scienza ebbe nome in Europa - ed era cercato dagli infermi il suo soccorso - Mario Venturoli Mattei - compié l'edificio - e secondo il voto di lui - nel X anno dalla morte - ne portò qui le ceneri - con amore e riconoscenza di figlio - il III Aprile MCMVI" Translation: Count Cesare Mattei - above the ruins of an ancient fortress - built this castle where he lived for twenty-five years - charitable to the poor – an assiduous scholar - of the medical virtues of herbs - for which science was named in Europe - and was sought by the sick for his help - Mario Venturoli Mattei - completed the building - and according to his wishes – 10 years from his death - his ashes were brought here - with love and gratitude as a son - the 3 April 1906

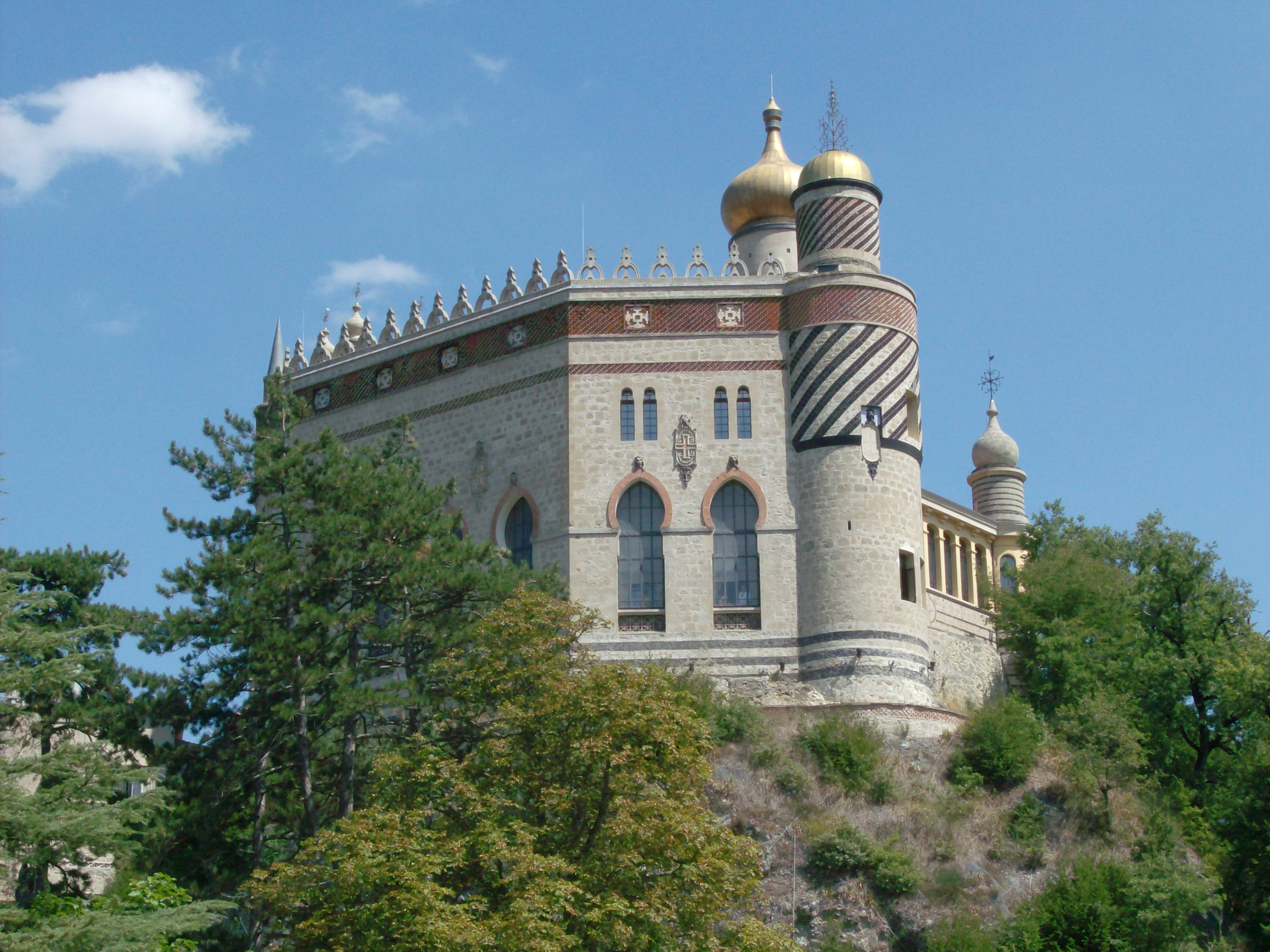
The Rocchetta Mattei in 2015

A large and spacious staircase leads to the vestibule of the main living area. A hippogriff is guarding the entrance, through which one passes into a courtyard dug into the rock. Two caryatids support the jamb of the front door. The monolith basin that occupies the center comes from the parish church of Verzuno where it served as a baptismal font. Entering the courtyard, in the left corner, Cesare Mattei laid the first stone of the building in November 5, 1850, in the presence of a few friends.

From the same side, a door leads to a ladder and then to the magnificent loggia known as the Loggia Carolina built in oriental style. The staircase of the tower leads through a drawbridge to a small room with small windows and a stalactite ceiling, which was the bedroom of Count Cesare Mattei. Here, the original furniture and pipes owned by the count are still preserved. There is also the ‘Vision’s Staircase’ (Scala delle visioni) which is allegorical depiction in the vault representing the new homeopathic science winning over traditional medicine. Two couplets from the Latinist abbot Giordan, Nicoise, friend of Mattei and guest in Rocchetta Mattei, celebrate the victory:

"Finxerat. Haec. Deus. Huc Immissa. Light. Superne Signavitque. Umbras. Lumine. Ducta. Manus Hisce. Nova. Ex. Herbis. Mundo. Medicine. Paratur Hinc. Vetus. She. Fugit. Victima. Strata. Jacet."

The staircase leads to a room on the top of the main tower. Returning to the Loggia Carolina is the White Room and the Turkish Room. After a short stretch of uncovered rock, there is the Courtyard of the Lions, a reproduction of the courtyard of the Alhambra in Granada. The remains of Cesare Mattei are found inside an ark covered with majolica.

Going back from the Courtyard of the Lions one enters the hall of peace, named so in homage to the victorious end of the Great War. Next is the hall of music in the church, a reproduction of the cathedral of Cordoba. Next to the church is the Room of the Ninety, so called because the Count Mattei wanted to keep a banquet of old nonagenarians when he reached this age. He died before his time without having seen the finished room, which was finished by his adopted son Mario Venturoli Mattei. When one exits the park there is an elegant stone staircase that leads to the Porrettana Railway. Various small structures once used as service rooms are now converted into villas, which crown the main building.

== Gallery ==
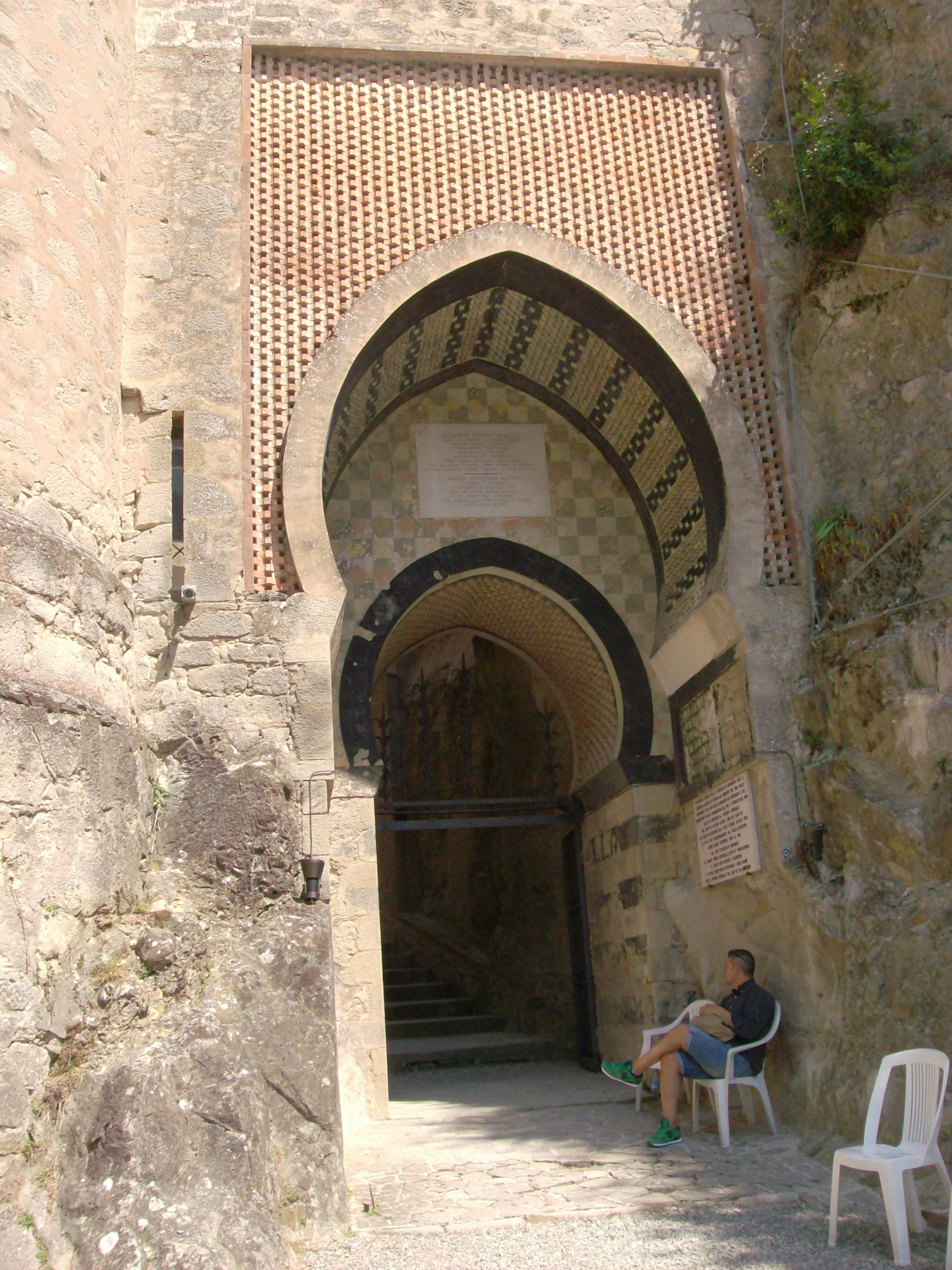
The entrance

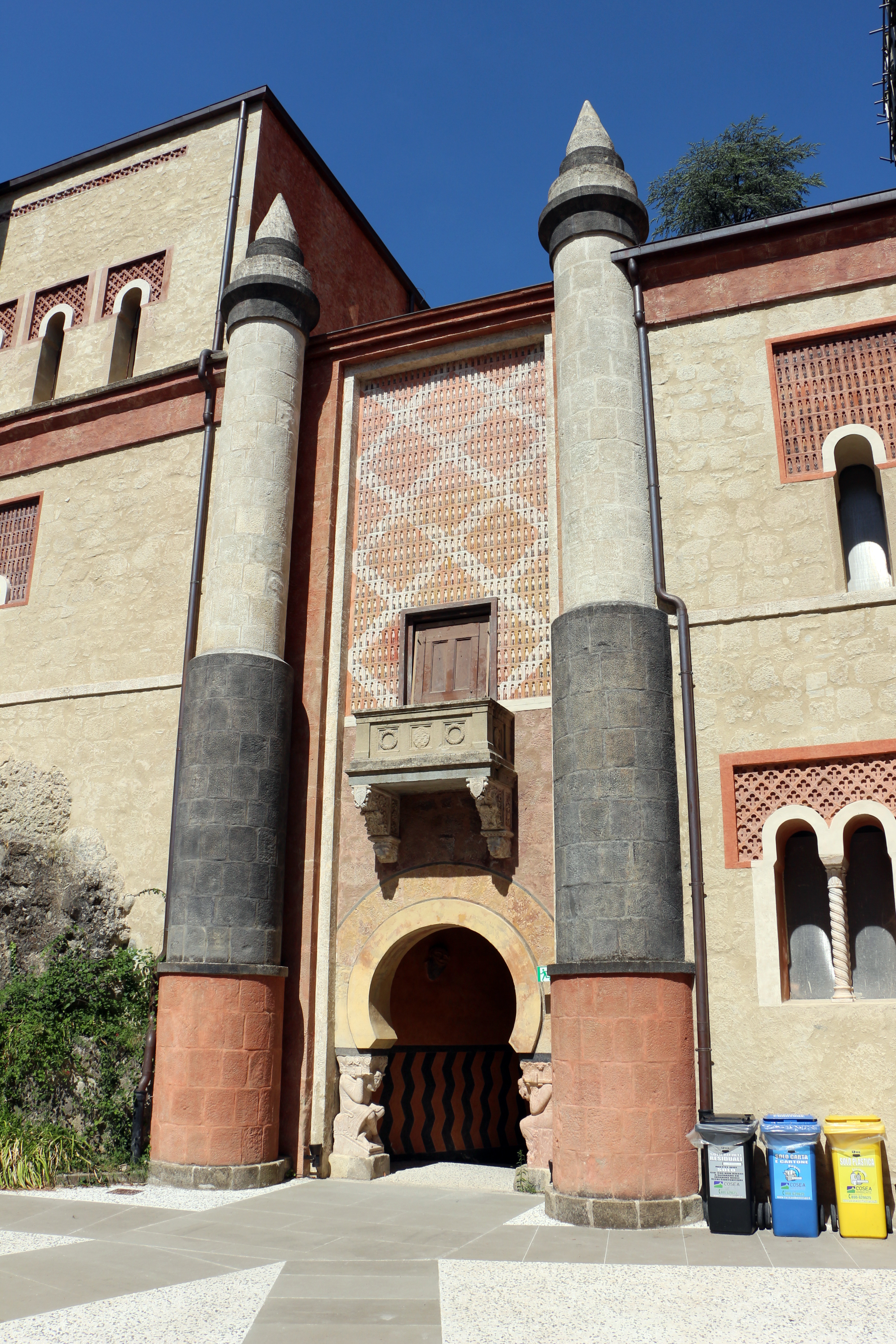
The main courtyard

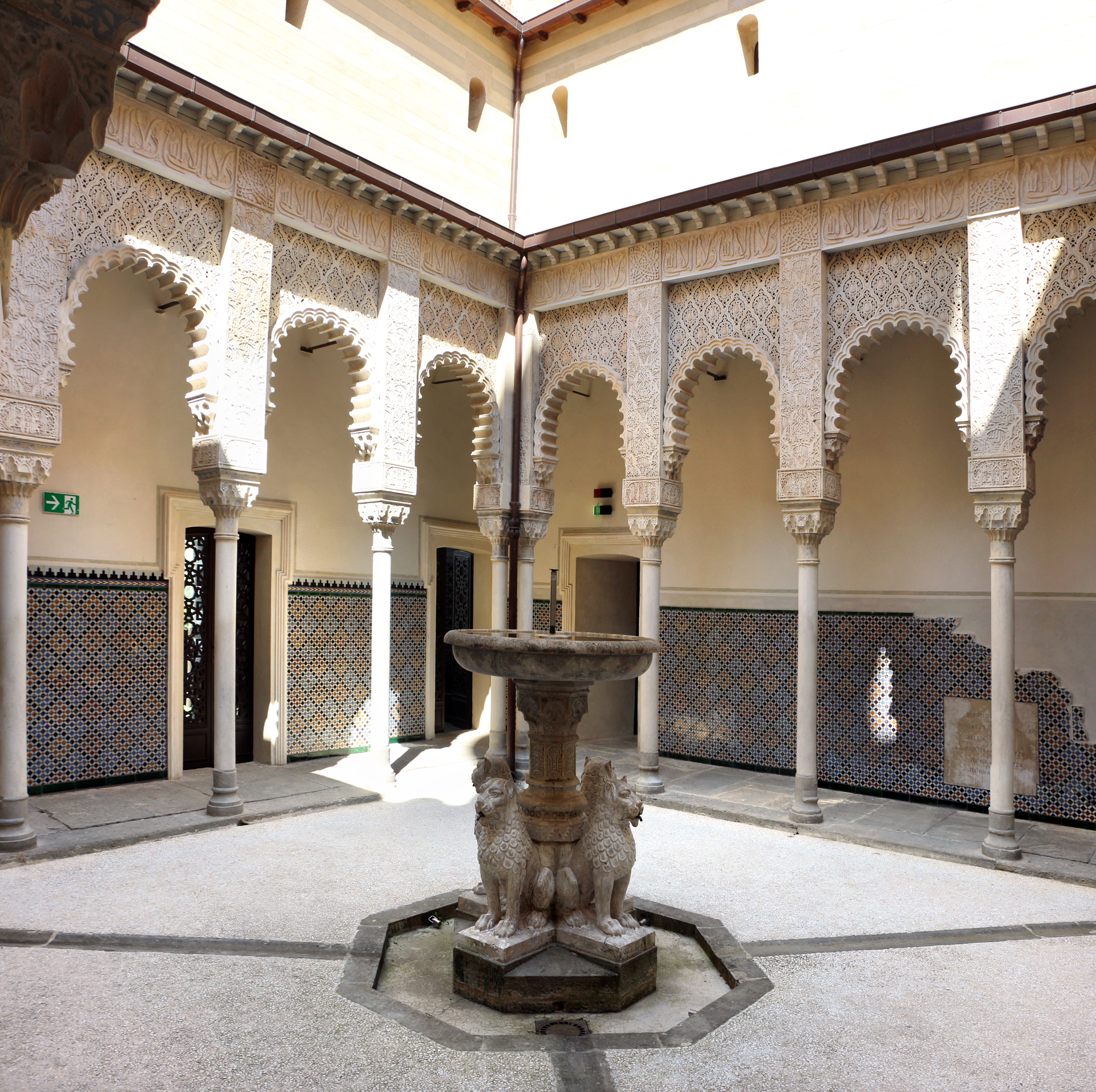
The Courtyard of the Lions

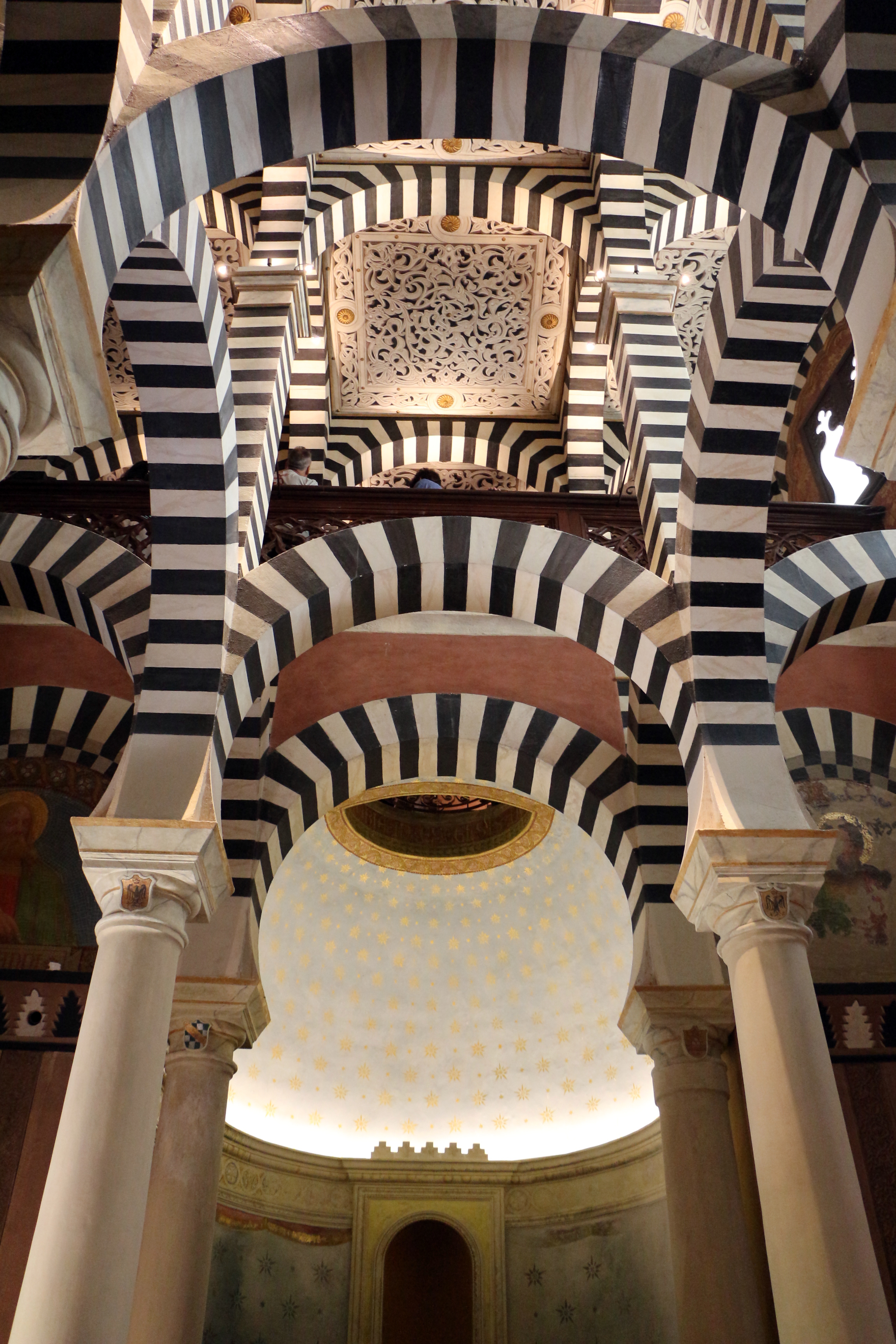
The chapel

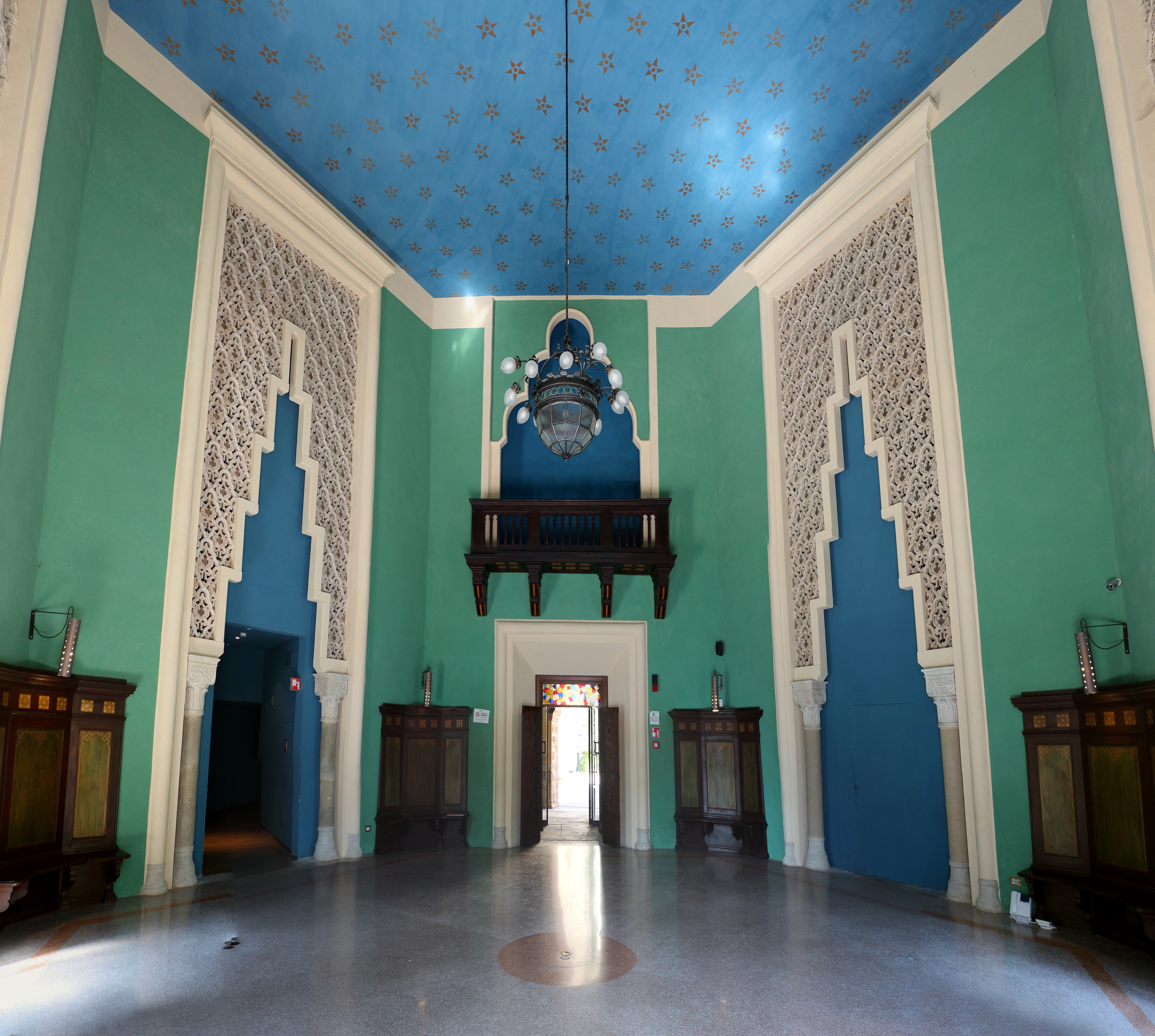
The Room of the Ninety
