= List of hydroelectric power station failures =

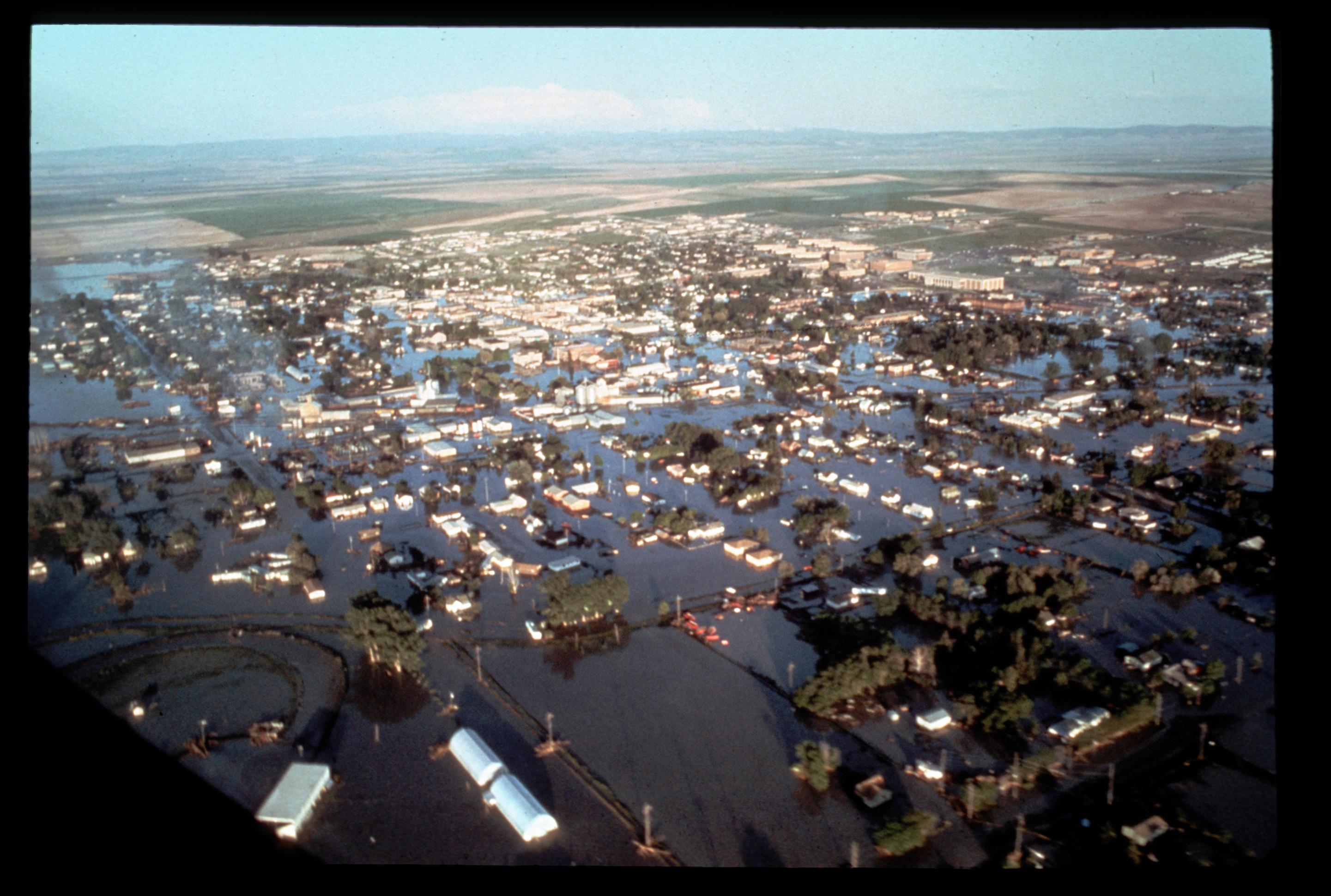
Rexburg flooded following Teton Dam failure

This is a list of major hydroelectric power station failures due to damage to a hydroelectric power station or its connections. Every generating station trips from time to time due to minor defects and can usually be restarted when the defect has been remedied. Various protections are built into the stations to cause shutdown before major damage is caused. Some hydroelectric power station failures may go beyond the immediate loss of generation capacity, including destruction of the turbine itself, reservoir breach and significant destruction of national grid infrastructure downstream. These can take years to remedy in some cases.

Where a generating station is large compared to the connected grid capacity, any failure can cause extensive disruption within the network. A serious failure in a proportionally large hydroelectric generating station or its associated transmission line will remove a large block of power from the grid that may lead to widespread disturbances.

== List of failures ==
Plant	Location	Country	Description	Year	Reference
Shawinigan-1 power station	Shawinigan Falls	Canada	Friday the 13th of September 1912. Bursting of a turbine resulting in the flooding of the facility and the death of a worker. 9 others were injured.	1912	
St. Francis Dam	Los Angeles County	United States	Catastrophically failed due to a defective soil foundation and design flaws, triggering a flood that killed at least 431 people.	1928	
Sella Zerbino Dam	Molare	Italy	Catastrophically failed due to overtopping after a heavy rainfall event, triggering a flood that killed at least 111 people.	1935	
Möhne Reservoir	Ruhr	Germany	Destroyed during WWII by RAF Lancaster bombers during Operation Chastise. 5.1 MW capacity lost for about six weeks. At least 1,579 people killed by the resulting floodwave.	1943	
Edersee Dam	Waldeck-Frankenberg	Germany	Destroyed during WWII by RAF Lancaster bombers during Operation Chastise. 16 MWe of generation lost.	1943	
Sui-ho, Fusen, Kyosen and Choshin Dams		Korea	Due to enemy bombing, attacked during the Korean War resulting in the loss of approximately 90% of North Korea's generation capacity	1952	
Schoellkopf Power Station	Niagara Falls, New York	United States	Destruction of the plant as it fell from the Niagara Gorge wall and collapsed into the Niagara River, caused by water seeping into the back wall of the power station. One worker was killed and damage was estimated at US$100 million (or $1184 million today, adjusted for inflation).	1956	
Malpasset Dam	Côte d'Azur	France	The Breach was caused by a tectonic fault in the impermeable rock base, which had been inadequately surveyed. 423 deaths	1959	
Vajont Dam	Pordenone	Italy	Overtopping due to landslide caused by instability of the rock around, with the evidence of the instability suppressed by the Government. 1,917 deaths	1963	
Mangla Dam	Kashmir	Pakistan	The power house was damaged due to an Indian Air Force raid during the Indo-Pakistani War of 1971. The 1000 MW hydro project was temporarily out of service.	1971	
Banqiao Dam	Henan	China	1975 Banqiao Dam failure: 26,000 dead from flooding, 145,000 dead from subsequent famine and epidemics, 11 million homeless. Caused loss of generation, dam failed by overtopping in a 1-in-2,000 year flood	1975	
Teton Dam	Idaho	United States	The dam foundations washed away and a wave swept aside everything in its path, including two towns, killing at least 11 people and thousands of cattle.	1976	
Machchhu Dam	Morbi	India	The Machhu Dam-II collapsed, leading to the deluge of the city of Morbi and the surrounding rural areas. 1,800–25,000 people were killed.	1979	
Lawn Lake Dam	Colorado	United States	Failed in fair weather due to a combination of poor construction, age, and neglect. Caused downstream failure of the Cascade Dam. Destroyed historical Stanley hydro power station and a fish hatchery. Flooded a campground and the town of Estes Park impacting 75% of business activity. $31 million in damages and three people killed. Three similar dams in the region were subsequently demolished.	1982	
Dartmouth Dam	Victoria	Australia	The 180MW Francis turbine-generator running at full speed was instantaneously stopped by a foreign body left in the penstock following maintenance. The installation shifted about 2m within the base of the 180m high earth and rock fill gravity dam wall of the 3,906GL reservoir. After initial consternation regarding the integrity of the wall (declared safe after lengthy assessment), the hydro installation was repaired/replaced but was off-line for several years. A breach of the wall would have obliterated only a couple of small towns and a sparsely settled agricultural area in the relatively narrow 120 km Mitta Mitta valley below the dam, but more significantly, would have resulted in the over-topping and probable failure of the earthen walls of the 40m high 3,038GL Lake Hume, 200 km downstream on the Murray River. This is immediately upstream of the regional cities of Albury and Wodonga and a much more intensively settled irrigation area, and consequences would have been disastrous.	1990	
Srisailam Dam	Andhra Pradesh	India	Due to poor reservoir operation, flood water overflowed into the semi underground power house (770 MW) from the point where a protection wall was to be constructed before power house commissioning in 1987. Flood water deluge caused the complete submergence of power house, massive debris accumulation, electrical equipment replacement and loss of power generation for a year	1998	
Bieudron Hydroelectric Power Station	Valais	Switzerland	1269 MW loss, penstock rupture, three fatalities, flooding and loss of generating capacity	2000	
Taum Sauk Hydroelectric Power Station	Missouri	United States	Due to its being designed without a spillway and continuing to operate when management knew the gauging system was faulty, the upper reservoir was overtopped when water continued to be pumped from the lower reservoir after the upper was already full. A large section of the upper reservoir failed, draining over a billion gallons of water (4 million m³) in less than half an hour. There were no fatalities, but five people were injured. The failure resulted in permanent damage to the surrounding landscape and power generation did not resume until 2010.	2005	
Itaipu Dam	Paraná (BR); Alto Paraná (PY)	Brazil; Paraguay	18 GW power generation loss due to storm damage of transmission lines.	2009	see also: 2009 Brazil and Paraguay blackout
Sayano-Shushenskaya Dam	Khakassia	Russia	2009 Sayano-Shushenskaya hydro accident, 6 GW power generation loss, 75 fatalities due to turbine failure	2009	
Srisailam Dam	Andhra Pradesh	India	On 2 October 2009, an earth dam burst above the Srisailam reservoir creating a record inflow which threatened the dam	2009	
Vishnuprayag hydro electric station (400 MW)	Uttarakhand	India	Flash floods resulted in accumulation of huge quantity of muck and debris in the dam reservoir	2013	
Dhauliganga hydro electric station (280 MW)	Uttarakhand	India	Unprecedented flash floods in June, 2013 in the State of Uttarakhand causing the complete submergence of power house. Massive debris accumulation, electrical equipment replacement and loss of total generation capacity for more than six months.	2013	
Uri-II Power Station (240 MW)	Jammu and Kashmir	India	A large fire incident happened in one of the transformers of the power station.	2014	
Oroville Dam	California	United States	Damaged spillway caused evacuation of 180,000	2017	See also: Oroville Dam crisis
Kakhovka Dam	Kherson Oblast	Ukraine (occupied by Russia)	Breached during the Russian invasion of Ukraine. The destruction of the dam led to tens of thousands of people being in a flood zone and more than 50 deaths.	2023	See also: Destruction of the Kakhovka Dam
Bargi hydroelectric power station	Camugnano	Italy	Explosion in turbine killed six workers.	2024	See also: 2024 Lake Suviana explosion
Liulan Reservoir (六蓝水库)	Guangxi	China	The dam failure at the Liulan Reservoir on July 6, 2026, resulted in at least 39 deaths and severely damaged the integrated hydroelectric power system, rendering it completely inoperable.	2026	

== See also ==
- Dam failure
- List of power outages
- Hydraulic engineering
- Hydroelectricity
- List of significant thermal power station failures
- Operation Chastise
- Malpasset Dam
- St. Francis Dam
- Taum Sauk Hydroelectric Power Station
