= Limentra =

Limentra may refer to two rivers in central-northern Italy:

- Limentra di Sambuca or Limentra occidentale
- Limentra orientale or Limentra di Treppio
