= Cesare Mattei =

Italian noble (1809–1896)

Count Cesare Mattei
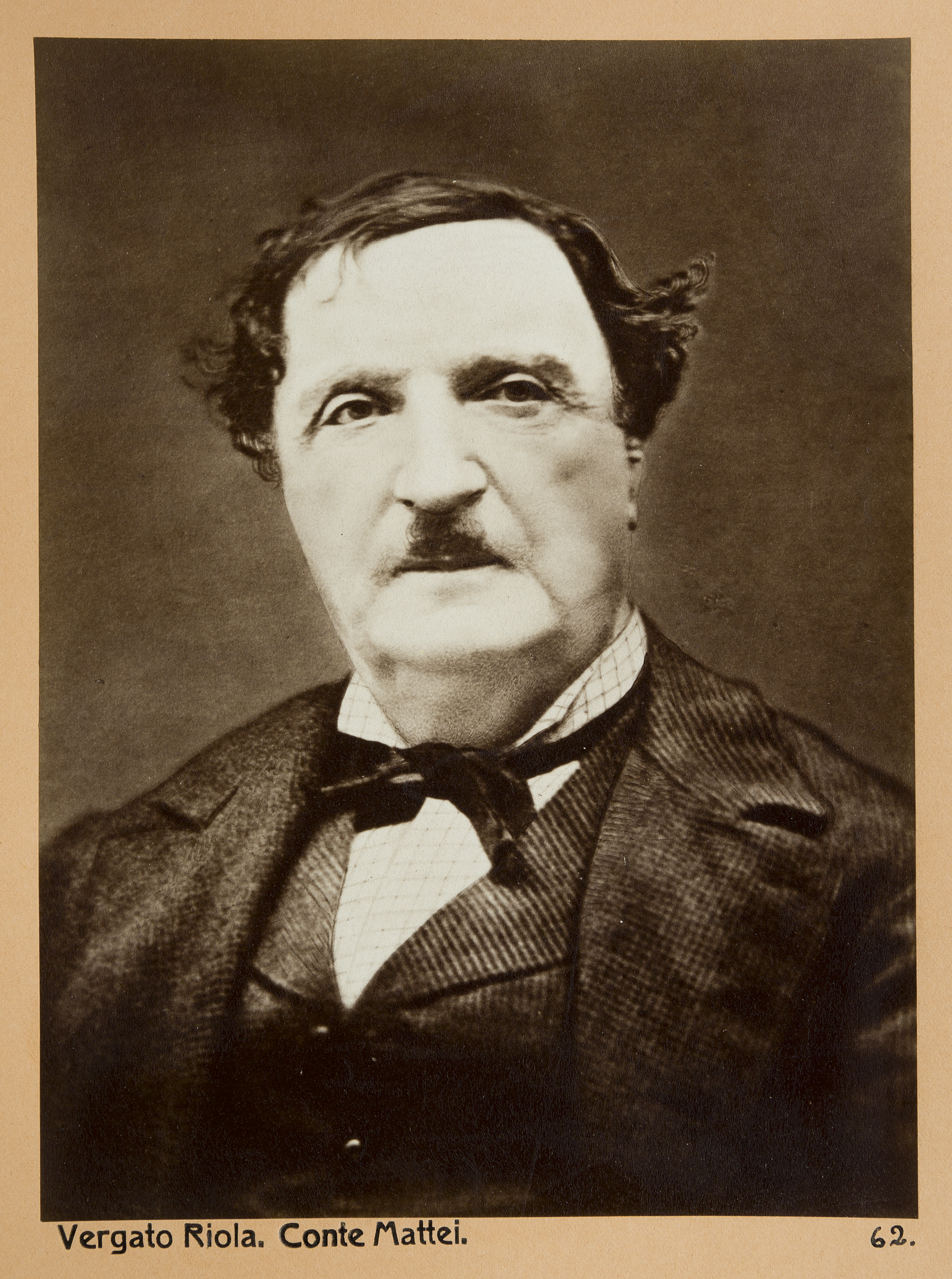
- Count Cesare Mattei

1847
- Predecessor: Title created
- Born: 11 January 1809; Bologna, Kingdom of Italy (Napoleonic)
- Died: 3 April 1896 (aged 87); Grizzana Morandi, Emilia-Romagna, Kingdom of Italy
- Noble family: Mattei

Count Cesare Mattei (Bologna, 11 January 1809 – Grizzana Morandi, 3 April 1896) was an Italian politician, man of letters and homeopath. He is best known for his idea of electrohomeopathy, which like other forms of homeopathy is considered pseudoscience.

== Biography ==
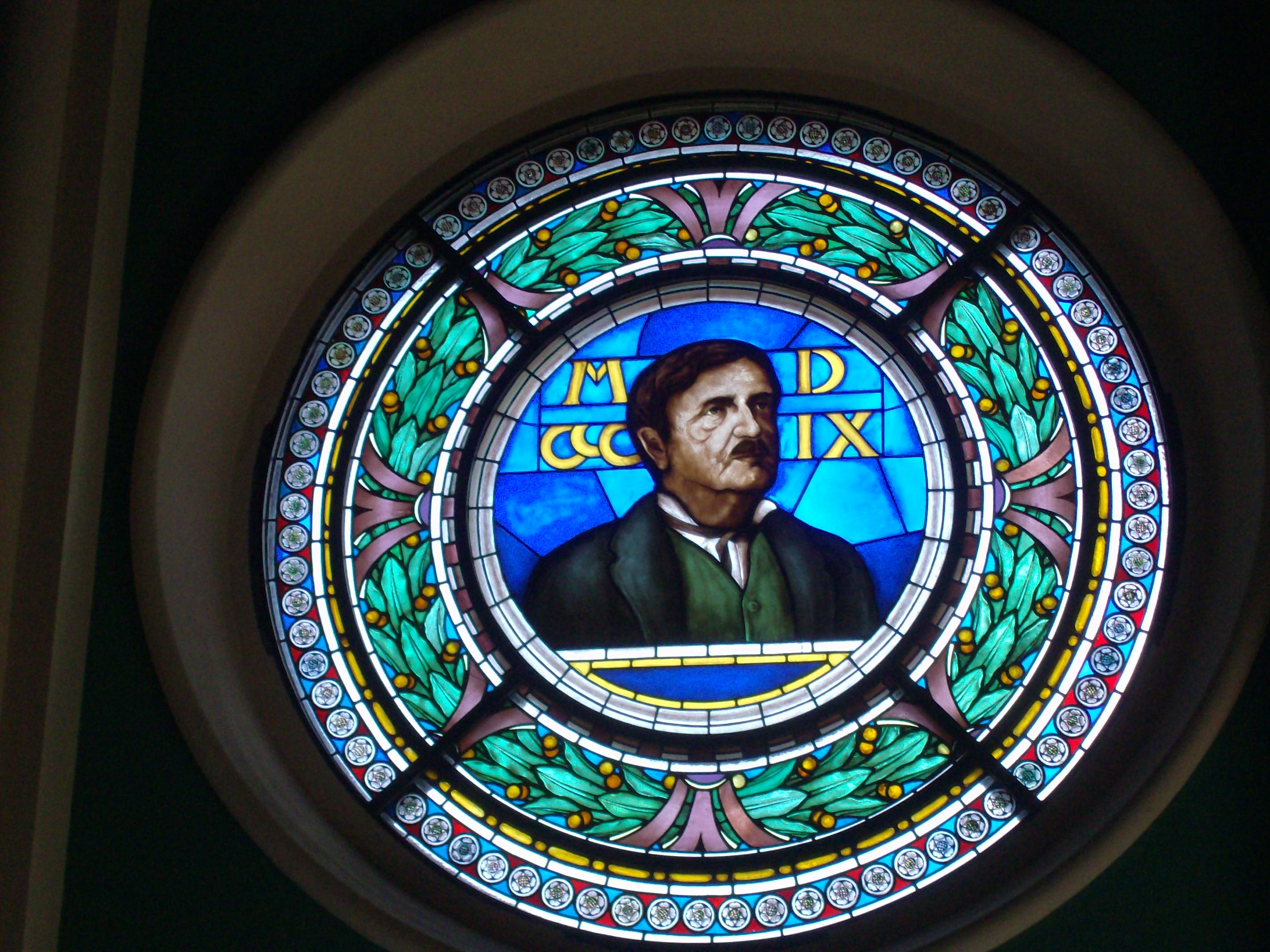
Cesare Mattei

Cesare Mattei was born in Bologna on 11 January 1809 in the wealthy family, and grew up in contact with the greatest thinkers of the time such as Minghetti and Paolo Costa. In 1837 he was one of the founders of the Cassa di Risparmio in Bologna. He received the title of count in 1847 from Pope Pius IX for a land donation in that of Comacchio which would have helped the Papal States to stop the Austrian advance.

He was appointed Deputy to the Enlistment Council of the Bolognese Civic Guard with the rank of lieutenant colonel and chief of the General Staff, a position which was later abandoned as he was elected, in 1848, deputy to the Parliament of Rome. In 1850, after the death of his mother due to a tumor, he decided to retire from political life to devote himself to the study of medicine. He bought the land where the ruins of the ancient fortress of Savignano stood and on 5 November of the same year he laid the first stone of the castle that he would call " Rocchetta", where he settled definitively starting from 1859.

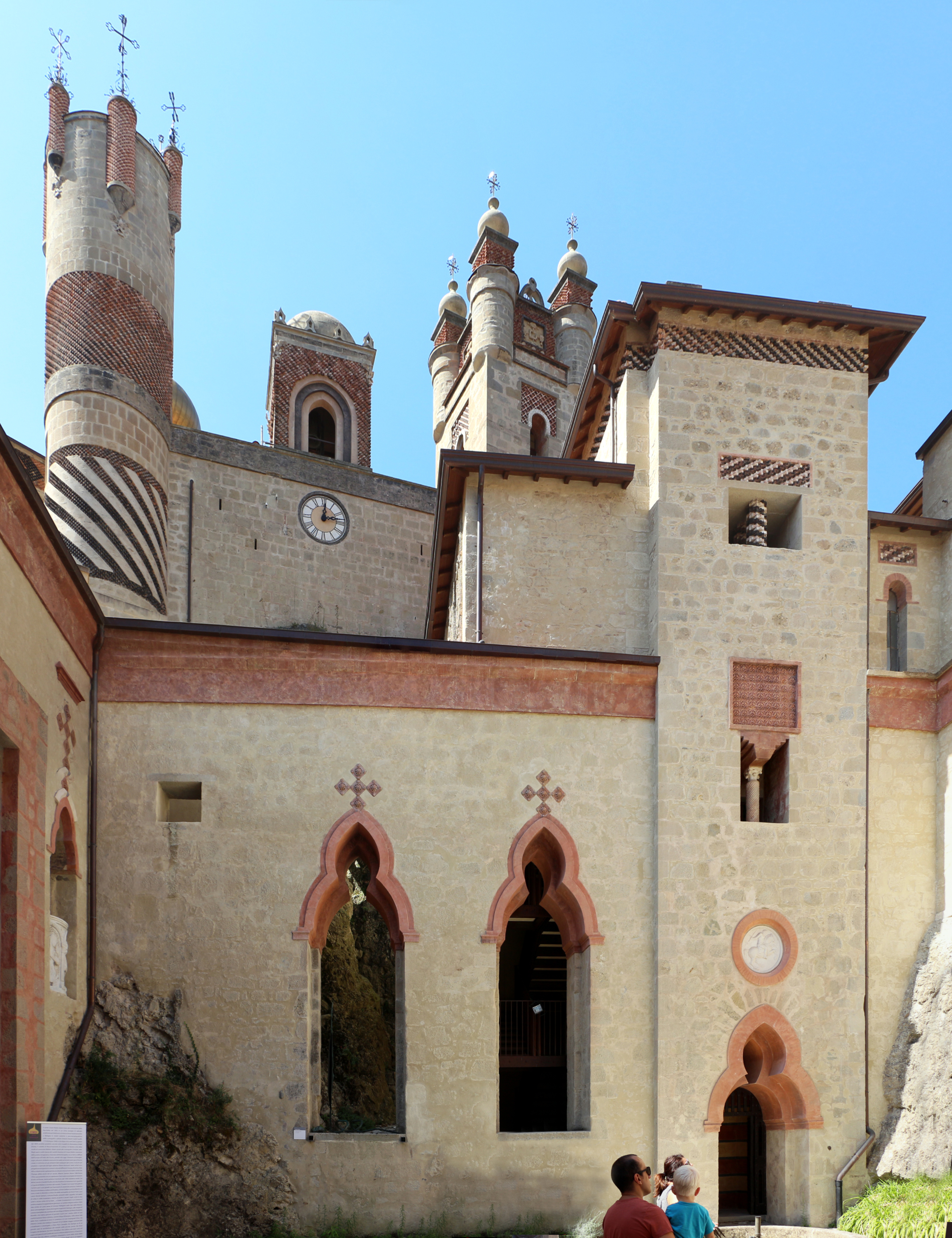
The Rocchetta Mattei that the count had built in 1850 on the ruins of the ancient fortress of Savignano, and where he resided permanently starting from 1859

Going beyond the theories of Hahnemann (founder of homeopathy) he elaborated a new medical theory which he called Electrohomeopathy and in 1881, although opposed by, began the production of electro-homeopathic remedies exporting them also abroad. A central warehouse was born in Bologna and another 26 authorized deposits worldwide which grew to 107 in 1884, among the most important those in Belgium, United States of America, Haiti and China. In the years 1887/1888, erroneous financial speculations of his nephew Luigi Mattei, predestined heir and co-owner of almost all the properties, caused a very serious economic crisis to the family. Unable to cope with the debts and the very high rates of the usurers, many assets were auctioned. The ruin threatened to overwhelm all the patrimony, including the Rocchetta. He decided to disinherit his grandson and managed to partially heal the situation, assisted by his collaborator Mario Venturoli (1858–1937), whom he adopted in 1888 as a sign of gratitude. In 1895, now elderly and paranoid by the constant disputes with doctors allopathic, due to a misunderstanding with his daughter-in-law (suspected of having tried to kill him by serving him a poisoned coffee), he chased her away and Mario from the castle and later disinherited them. He died on 3 April 1896 at the age of 87.

The coffin was transported to the small church of Savignano with the honor of Porretta's music and about 2000 people following. On 14 April 1896, an Office was celebrated with 60 priests and more than 6000 people, who crowded into the spaces around the church to pay homage to him.

== Electro homeopathy after Mattei ==
In 1904, Venturoli managed to be co-heir with his nephews, finished the work at the Rocchetta, modernized houses and villas and continued the electro-homeopathic activity. In 1906, as expressly requested in his will, his remains were taken to Rocchetta and buried in the chapel. In 1914, despite his death, the deposits increased again and became 266 all over the world. In 1937, Mario Venturoli died and his widow, Giovanna Maria Longhi, who also inherited.

== Publications ==
Mattei illustrated his principles in numerous publications, many were translated into different European languages:

- A little history of the remedies Mattei, Bologna 1874; 2nd ed. 1881;
- Emancipation of man from the doctor for remedies Mattei, Bologna 1875;
- Electromyopathy: a new science that cures the blood and heals the body: a book dictated by Count Cesare Mattei for the good of the peoples that most doctors refuse to treat

with electromyopathy, Casale Monferrato 1878; 2nd ed., Bologna 1881;

- The new science of Count Cesare Mattei and the old science of Dr. C, Casale Monferrato 1878;
- Vade-mecum of electro-homeopathy. Brief guide for anyone who wants to be treated with electro homeopathy, Nice 1879;
- Electro-homeopathy, new vade-mecum: new and true guide to everyone who wants to heal himself with electro-homeopathy, Bologna 1883, many editions up to 1937;
- New science: history of electromyopathy, Bologna 1892.
