= Lithofacies =

Lithofacies may refer to:

- A mappable subdivision of a designated stratigraphic unit, distinguished from adjacent subdivisions on the basis of lithology; a facies characterized by particular lithologic features
- The rock record of any particular sedimentary environment, including both physical and organic characteristics
- cf: Lithotope
