= Suviana and Brasimone lakes regional park =

Protected area in Italy

The regional park of the Suviana and Brasimone lakes (Italian: parco regionale dei laghi di Suviana e Brasimone) is a protected natural area established in 1995, consisting of two artificial lakes, Lake Suviana and Lake Brasimone, and their surrounding area. The park is in the Bolognese Apennines, in Emilia-Romagna, on the border with Tuscany, in Italy. The lakes were built in 1933 and 1911, respectively, and used for the production of hydroelectricity. Inside the park are several smaller protected areas, including the abandoned village of Chiapporato, the Suviana and Brasimone Lakes protected area, (Italian: Laghi di Suviana e Brasimone, IT40500020).

A variety of animal and plant species have been recorded within the park. Plants include Fritillaria tenella, Saxifraga paniculata, and an assortment of trees including chestnuts, oaks, beeches and conifers. Animals recorded in the park include wolves, peregrine falcons, honey buzzards, nightjars, woodlarks, red-backed shrikes, quails, wrynecks, flycatchers, several species of bat, spectacled salamanders, and several species of crayfish.

The lakes are a popular tourist destination; camping and fishing are allowed. There is a museum dedicated to the nearby forest in the park.

== See also ==
- Basin of Pavana
