= Lake Suviana =

Artificial lake in Italy

Coordinates: 44.126°N 11.040°E

- Lago di Suviana (Italian)
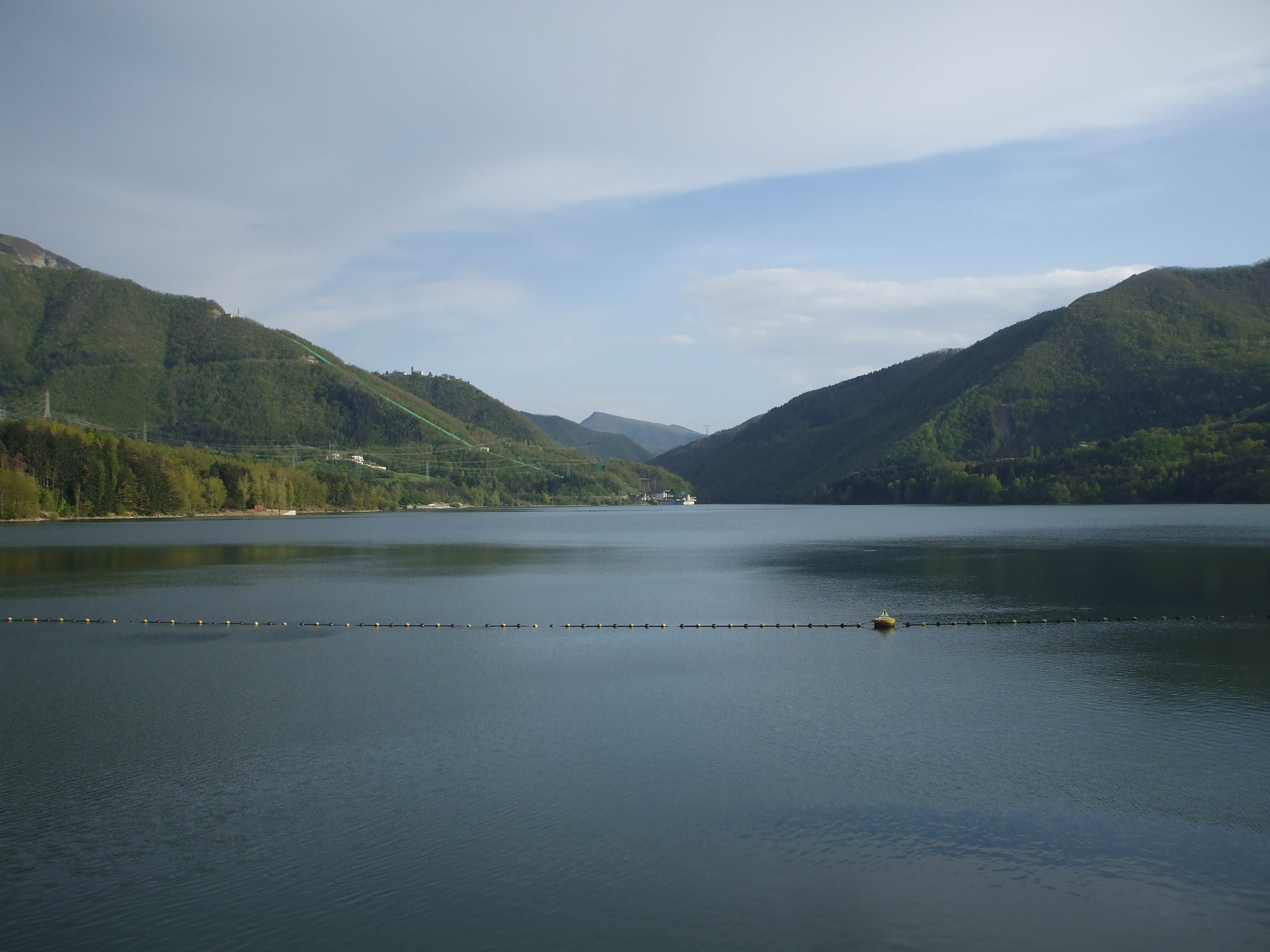
- Lake Suviana seen from the north
- Interactive map of Lake Suviana
- Location: Metropolitan City of Bologna, Emilia-Romagna, Italy
- Type: Artificial lake (reservoir)
- Primary inflows: Eastern Limentra stream

Lake Suviana (Italian: Lago di Suviana) is an artificial lake located in metropolitan city of Bologna, Italy in the Bolognese Apennines, formed following the construction of a 91.5 m (300 ft) high dam, begun in 1928 and completed in 1932.

The lake, surrounded by a pine forest, forms together with the nearby Lake Brasimone with grassy banks the Suviana and Brasimone lakes regional park that is a protected area since 1995. The lake is used for production of hydroelectric energy but also for bathing activities, water sports and carp fishing. In the lake are specimens of carp weighing 20 kg (44 lbs). The lake is equipped with various refreshment points and bathing facilities which make it a holiday destination during the summer season.

The basin is mainly fed by the eastern Limentra stream (or lower Limentra) and is located entirely in the metropolitan city of Bologna. The two banks border the municipality of Camugnano, to the east, and the municipality of Castel di Casio to the west. The villages of Suviana, Baigno, Badi, Bargi and Stagno overlook the lake. It is the largest lake in the province and one of the largest in the Emilia-Romagna region.

The Suviana dam was built by the State Railways with the aim of powering a hydroelectric power station with the waters of the lake, which still exists downstream of the dam, so that it could supply energy to the new Bologna-Florence railway line, known as the Direttissima. This power plant, which has a gross efficient power of 26,760 kW, exploits the waters of the Suviana basin and those of the Pavana basin, to which the lake is connected via a submerged railway tunnel.

Enel built in 1975 the Bargi hydroelectric power station upstream, which is also powered by the waters of the nearby and overlying Brasimone basin, which is connected to Lake Suviana by a pipeline that exploits the difference in height between the two reservoirs, approximately 384 m (1,260 ft). This connection, however, is not functional for production, but for "peak-shaving", that is, it is used in production during the hours of maximum demand, while in the hours of minimum load the turbines of the Bargi power plant, being reversible, pump the water back to the Brasimone basin, reconstituting the reserve. The original purpose was to shift the electrical load from day to night and from working days to holidays, to avoid switching off the thermoelectric units of the national grid.

== Explosion ==
On 9 April 2024, an explosion at the Bargi hydroelectric power station owned by Enel Green Power in the village of Bargi, upstream of Lake Suviana left at least seven workers dead, five others critically injured along with four missing.
