= Limentra orientale =

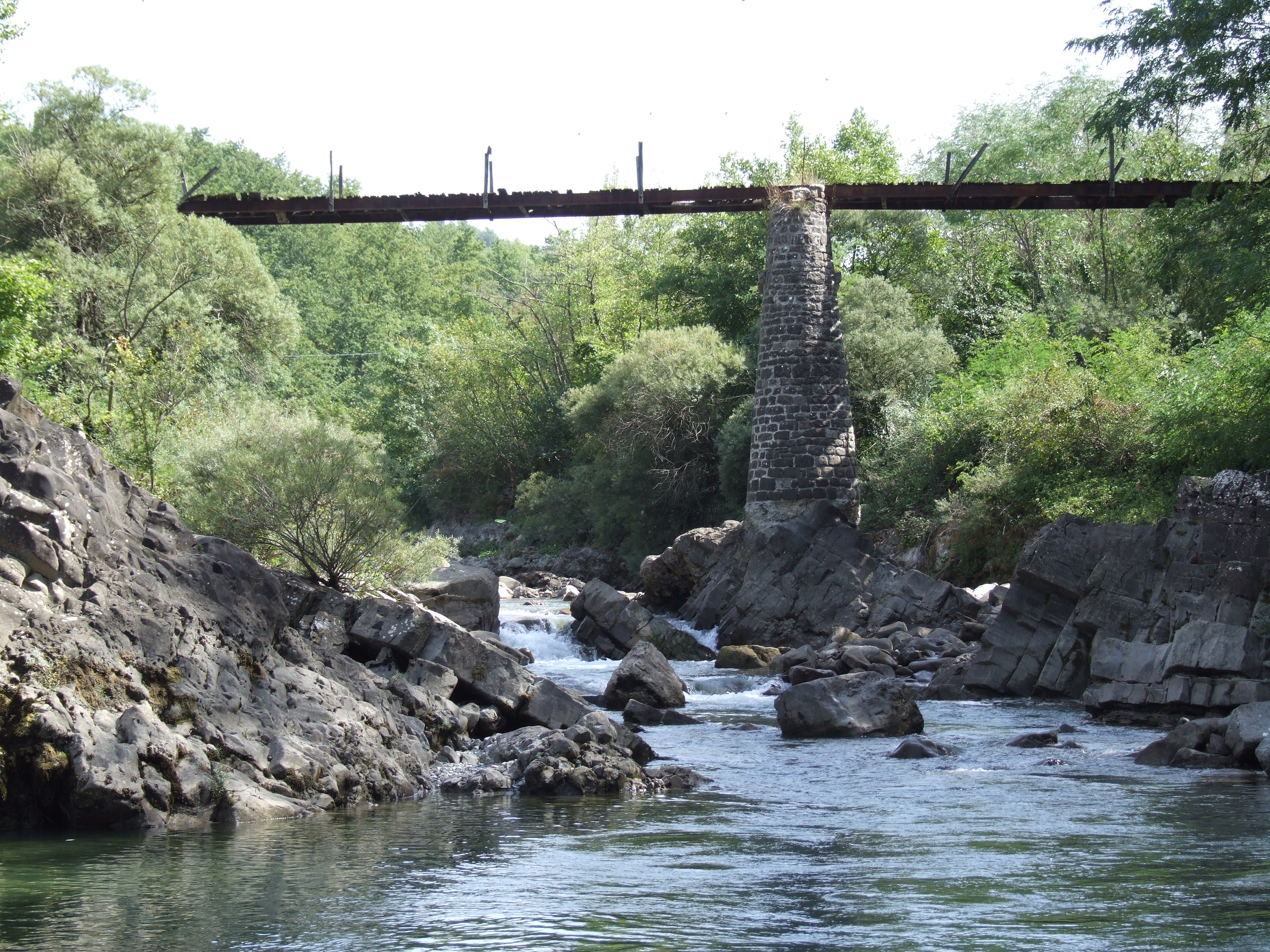

Location
- Country: Italy

Physical characteristics
- Mouth: Reno
  - coordinates: 44.2271°N 11.0621°E
- Length: 41 km (25 mi)

Basin features
- Progression: Reno→ Adriatic Sea

The Limentra orientale (also: Limentra di Treppio) is a mountain river in Italy, a right tributary of the Reno. Its valley runs roughly from southwest to northeast, on the north side of the Apennine Mountains. Its upper valley is part of the Natura 2000 protected area Tre Limentre – Reno. Near Suviana is a 97 m (318 ft) high dam, creating one of the largest reservoirs of the Apennines, Lake Suviana, with a capacity of about 46,000,000 cubic metres (1.6×10^{9} cu ft). It was built between 1928 and 1932 and is used for hydropower. The Bargi hydroelectric power station, site of a deadly explosion in April 2024, is situated at Lake Suviana. The Limentra orientale enters the Metropolitan City of Bologna near Lentula and Treppio. It flows into the Reno after 41 kilometres (25 mi), near Riola di Vergato.
