= Lake Brasimone =

Artificial lake in Italy

Coordinates: 44.124°N 11.114°E

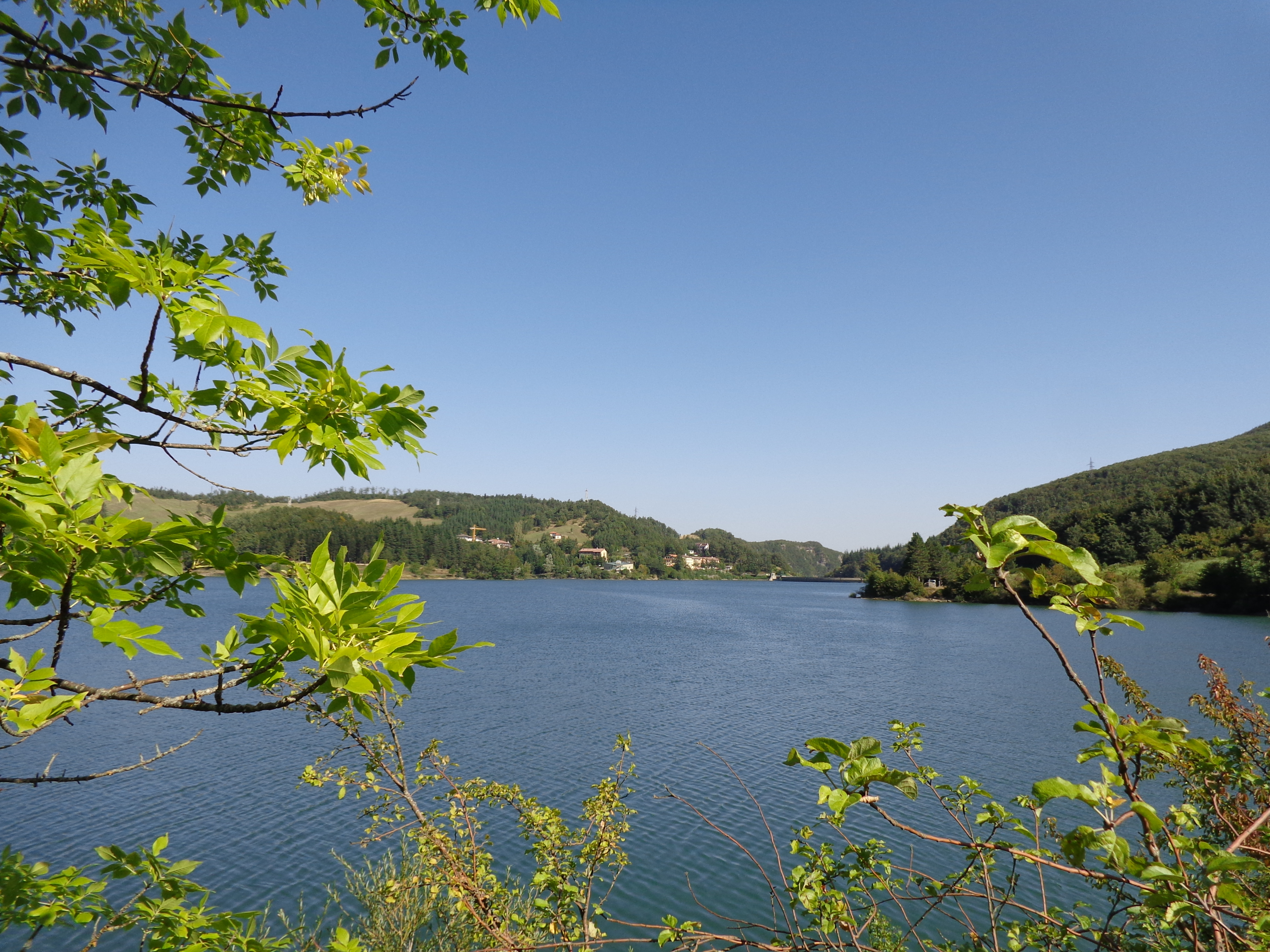
Lake Brasimone

Lake Brasimone (Italian: Lago del Brasimone; also known as the Scalere basin and the Brasimone basin) is an artificial lake located on the Bolognese Apennines along the Brasimone stream, in the municipal territory of Camugnano and is included within the Suviana and Brasimone.

== History ==
At the beginning of the 20th century, the construction of the reservoir was taken into consideration by the growing demand for electricity for domestic and industrial uses by the city of Bologna.

The project, born from an intuition of the engineer. Fausto Baratta, was presented to the Civil Engineers on 24 April 1906.

In 1910, the Società Bolognese di Elettricità (SBE), on behalf of the Società Strade Ferrate Meridionali of Florence, started work on the construction of the dam near the Scalere mill, where the Brasimone valley narrowed and the stream formed a suggestive series of jumps, while at the same time the hydroelectric power station of Santa Maria was built further downstream, near the ancient church of the same name.

On 27 April 1910, the excavation works were completed, while on 1 November 1911, after just 15 months and the employment of around 1200 labourers, the dam was completed and the roads running along the two banks were connected.

The realization of the project brought about a new layout of the territory and notable transformations of the landscape, but it also allowed the passage of a new road that connected Castiglione to Riola passing through Camugnano, allowing the Porrettana and the Bologna-Pistoia railway to be reached.

In 1917 a further barrier on the Brasimone will be placed downstream of Castiglione dei Pepoli by the construction of the Santa Maria dam, 23 meters high and built by the Arturo Pagani company to serve the Le Piane hydroelectric power station.

In the 70s, the waters of the Brasimone were brought into contact with the underlying Lake Suviana, through the construction of two imposing pipelines and the pumping system of the Bargi hydroelectric power station.

In the same period, the ENEA Brasimone Research Center was built on its south-eastern coast in which, according to an Italian-French project on fast sodium nuclear reactors, a reactor was to be built for PEC (Fuel Element Test) scientific experimentation, a liquid sodium refrigerated fast reactor designed for testing the behavior of fuel elements.

The works began in 1972 but, following the Chernobyl accident and the political will that developed after the 1987 referendum, a process of reconversion and repurposing of both the available resources and professional skills began.

In 1995, the area was included in the context of the Suviana and Brasimone Lakes Regional Park.

== Geology and hydrology ==
The gorges that the Brasimone torrent has carved, for a long stretch, at the foot of the western slope of Monte Gatta, are a peculiar erosive morphology deepened in the turbidite sandstones of the Castiglione dei Pepoli Formation.

The alternation between arenaceous-marly lithotypes, solid and poorly erodible, and other clayey ones, favored the setting up of the Brasimone artificial hydroelectric basin with the water retention dam founded on substantial arenaceous-marly rock outcrops, and with the reservoir developed in the clayey band behind. The power basin is composed entirely of firm arenaceous-marly soils, a characteristic which inhibits erosion, providing long-lasting guarantees to the hydroelectric basin.

The lake also collects the waters of the Torto stream, which always flows into it from the area between Monte Calvi and Monte Casciaio.

== Environment ==
The valley incision in which the lake rises emerges within a mixed forest with oak, chestnut, ash and hornbeam.
