= Porretta Terme =

Porretta Terme Puratta
- Frazione
- Location of Porretta Terme in Italy
- Coordinates: 44°9′37″N 10°58′24″E
- Country: Italy
- Region: Emilia-Romagna
- Province: Bologna (BO)
- Comune: Alto Reno Terme
- Elevation: 349 m (1,145 ft)

Population (2014)
  - Total: 4,781
- Time zone: UTC+1 (CET)
  - Summer (DST): UTC+2 (CEST)
- Postal code: 40046
- Dialing code: 0534
- Patron saint: Mary Magdalene

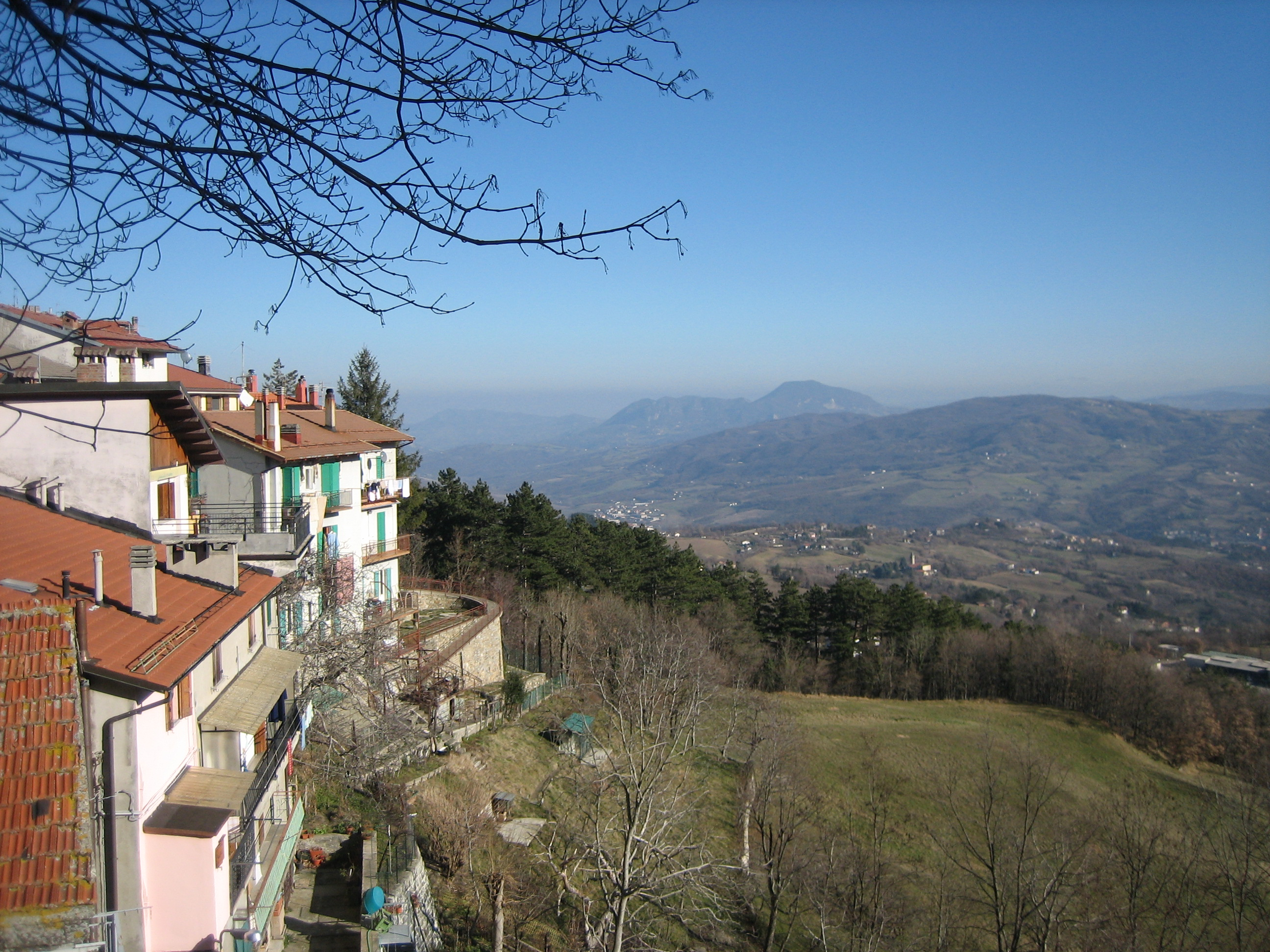
The district of Castelluccio, Porretta Terme

Porretta Terme (Bolognese: Puratta) is a town of the Reno Valley Tuscan-Emilian Apennines, a frazione of the comune of Alto Reno Terme, Emilia-Romagna. Porretta Terme is located about 60 kilometres (37 mi) south-west of Bologna. Known since Roman times for its thermal springs, it is also a center for winter sports thanks to the nearby resorts of Corno alle Scale, Abetone, Monte Cimone. It was a separate comune until January 2016, when it merged with Granaglione to form the new comune of Alto Reno Terme.

During campaign of Italy in World War II, Porretta housed the Headquarters of the 1st Brazilian Army division between November 1944 and the final breakthrough of the Gothic Line.

== Porretta Soul Festival ==
Since December 1987, Porretta Terme is the site of a soul music festival designed by Graziano Uliani, a passionate soul music fan, who, after attending the events in Macon, Georgia commemorating the 20th anniversary of the death of American musician Otis Redding, decided to dedicate a festival in his honour. The festival is associated with the Stax Museum of American Soul Music in Memphis and the Center for Southern Folklore in Memphis, USA.

Porretta Terme is served by Porretta Terme railway station.
