= Granaglione =

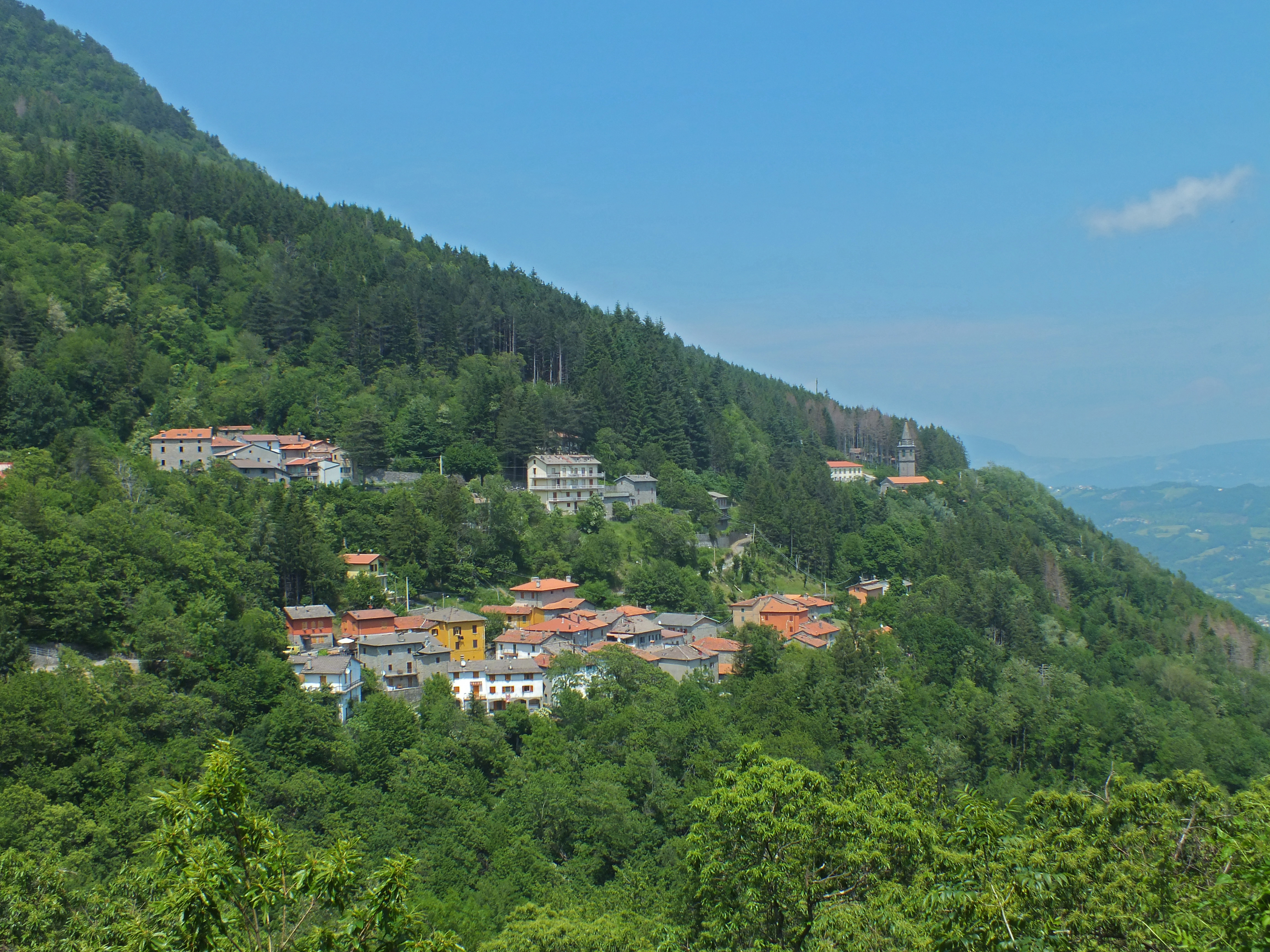
Granaglione 4267

Granaglione is a frazione (town) in the comune of Alto Reno Terme, in the Metropolitan City of Bologna, central Italy. It was a separate comune until January 2016, when it merged with Porretta Terme into the new entity of Alto Reno Terme.

== See also ==
- Bologna
