= Bargi, Camugnano =

Hamlet in Bologna, northern Italy

Bargi is a mountain hamlet of 44 inhabitants, in the municipality of Camugnano, in the metropolitan city of Bologna. The hamlet is located in the Tuscan-Emilian Apennines, at an altitude of 674 meters above sea level. Among the hamlets of the municipality of Camugnano it is the penultimate in terms of population.

== History ==
The first human settlements in this area date back to the Bronze Age, there is no specific information on Bargi, but there is a possibility that the area was inhabited until then, as axes, axes and votive statuettes dated precisely to this age. Even in the age relating to the Etruscans there is no specific information on Bargi, but in the nearby town of Carpineta, shards and a bronze head of a bull were found.

Between the 6th and 8th centuries the border between Tuscia and the Exarchate of Ravenna passed in the territory of Bargi. In the 10th century, with the establishment of the feudal regime, Bargi was initially controlled by the Counts Alberti of Prato, but shortly after it became a territory of constant war between the Stagnesi, supported by the Pistoia people, and the Bolognese government. In the mid-13th century a peace pact was signed between the people of Pistoia and Bologna, but in 1306 the castle of Stagno was conquered by the Counts of Panico. Their dominion did not last long and possession of the castle, as well as that of the surrounding areas, passed into the hands of the Bolognese. In 1451 the castle of Bargi was destroyed by Baldazzo d'Anghieri, the pope's ally against Bologna. In 1789, under the laws of the new state, Bargi was subjected to the municipality of Casio and finally to the municipality of Camugnano.

== Places of interest ==
The Palazzo Comelli complex is located in the historic village of Casa Melati, at the head of the long staircases and overlooking Lake Suviana, it is also part of the regional park of the Suviana and Brasimone lakes. The building was built in medieval times in the style of the Comacine masters and was subsequently transformed into a palace by the Comelli family of notaries. The Comellis lived there until the end of the 20th century, and Gianbattista Comelli was the last to live there permanently. Since 2004 the building has been owned by the municipality and was the subject of a restyling project in 2005. It is now part of the Camugnano Ecomuseum and has been reopened to the public since 2014. The complex is surrounded by various stables and barns and by the Settler's House. Inside the palace you can also consult the historical notarial archive of the Comelli family, and in addition to the vast archive, another peculiarity of the palace is the complete presence of all the noble furnishings that were in the possession of the Comelli family. On the road to the palace there is also the oratory of Santa Maria in Porcole, an ancient oratory which for a long time was a stop for pilgrims on their way to Florence and Rome.
