= Electrohomeopathy =

19th-century pseudoscientific cancer treatment

Electrohomeopathy, also called electrohomoeopathy, electropathy or the Mattei cancer cure, is a historical proposed alternative to miasma theory and then-increasingly popular germ theory, as well as associated techniques. Invented in the 19th century by Count Cesare Mattei, the name is derived from a combination of electro (for electric bio-energy), homeo (Greek for "similar" or "like") and pathy (from the Greek word "pathos," which means "suffering"); it is an herbal medicine system that relies on the claimed healing properties of plants. The theory never saw significant mainstream success and the ideas have been characterized as quackery and described as "utter idiocy".

== History and criticism ==
Electrohomeopathy was devised by Cesare Mattei (1809–1896) in the latter part of the 19th century. Mattei, a nobleman living in a castle in the vicinity of Bologna, studied natural science, anatomy, physiology, pathology, chemistry and botany. He ultimately focused on the supposed therapeutic power of "electricity" in botanical extracts. Mattei made bold, unsupported claims for the efficacy of his treatments, including the claim that his treatments offered a nonsurgical alternative to cancer. His treatment regimens were met with scepticism by medical orthodoxy:

The electrohomeopathic system is an invention of Count Mattei who prates of "red," "blue," and "green" electricity, a theory that, in spite of its utter idiocy, has attracted a considerable following and earned a large fortune for its chief promoter.

After Mattei's death, his work was built upon by Theodore Krauss (1864-1924) who amplified the number of available treatments, including the introduction of injectable forms of treatment, and modernised production processes.

Notwithstanding criticisms, including a challenge by the British medical establishment to the claimed success of his cancer treatments, electrohomeopathy (or Matteism, as it was sometimes known at the time) attracted adherents in Germany, France, the US and the UK by the beginning of the 20th century; electrohomeopathy had been the subject of approximately 100 publications and there were three journals dedicated to it. By 1892, "in deference to popular clamour it was beginning to be practised even by regular medical practitioners." W. T. Stead published a challenge to the medical faculty, which resulted in a medical committee being set up, under Morell Mackenzie, to inquire into the claims of Matteism. All of the committee members were sceptical, but "we were all steadfastly resolved, if we should find ourselves mistaken, and if Mattei’s potions really should cure cancer in some inconceivable way, that we would admit our error and make known the true state of the case."

The committee observed five patients with cancer of the breast, selected by the Matteists who were treating them. After a year, they found that "the cancerous growths all continued to progress exactly as if no treatment whatever had been used. Some developed slowly, others more rapidly: but one, which had presented an unbroken surface at the outset, very soon became deeply ulcerated and excavated, and even the Matteists themselves were obliged to admit that “it seemed to be getting worse.” ... Matteism, in the deliberate judgment of the committee, consists exclusively of vulgar, unadulterated, unredeemed quackery... Mr. Stokes analysed the “electricities", and found them to yield no other reaction than that of plain distilled water."

== Philosophy ==
Remedies are derived from what are said to be the active micronutrients or mineral salts of certain plants. One contemporary account of the process of producing electrohomeopathic remedies was as follows:

As to the nature of his remedies we learn... that... they are manufactured from certain herbs, and that the directions for the preparation of the necessary dilutions are given in the ordinary jargon of homeopathy. The globules and liquids, however, are "instinct with a potent, vital, electrical force, which enables them to work wonders." This process of "fixing the electrical principle" is carried on in the secret central chamber of a Neo-Moorish castle which Count Mattei has built for himself in the Bolognese Apennines... The "red electricity" and "white electricity" supposed to be "fixed" in these "vegetable compounds" are in their very nomenclature and suggestion poor and miserable fictions.

According to Mattei's own ideas however, every disease originates in the change of blood or of the lymphatic system or both, and remedies can therefore be mainly divided into two broad categories to be used in response to the dominant affected system. Mattei wrote that having obtained plant extracts, he was "able to determine in the liquid vegetable electricity". Allied to his theories and therapies were elements of Chinese medicine, of medical humours, of apparent Brownianism, as well as modified versions of Samuel Hahnemann's homeopathic principles.

== Modern usage ==
A symposium took place in Bologna in 2008 to mark the 200th anniversary of the birth of Cesare Mattei, with attendees from India, Pakistan, Germany, the UK, and the USA. Electrohomeopathy is practised predominantly in India and Pakistan although it is not a recognised healthcare discipline in India, where it has been called "quackery".

== See also ==
- List of ineffective cancer treatments
