= Sambuca Pistoiese =

Administrative division in Tuscany, Italy

- Comune
- Comune di Sambuca Pistoiese
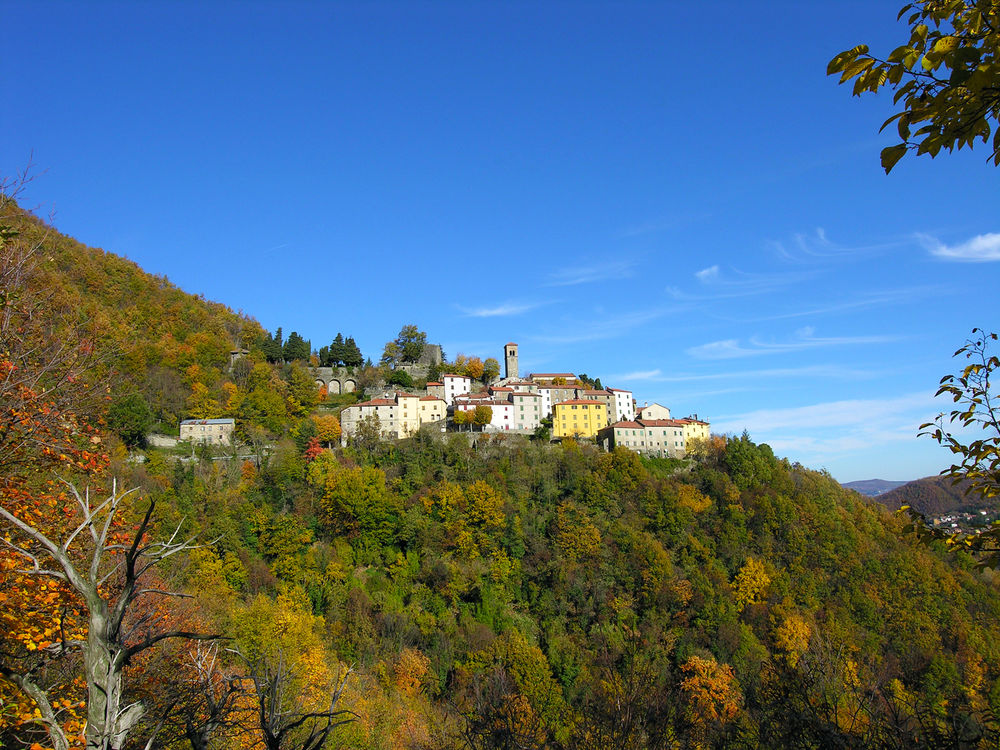
- View of Castello di Sambuca

- Coat of arms

- Location within Italy Location within Tuscany
- Coordinates: 44°06′N 10°59′E
- Country: Italy
- Region: Tuscany
- Province: Pistoia (PT)
- Frazioni: Castello di Sambuca, Bellavalle, San Pellegrino, Pàvana, Frassignoni, Monachino, Torri, Treppio, Taviano, Posola, Campeda, Lagacci, L'Acqua and Lentula

Government
  - Mayor: Fabio Micheletti (centre-left)

Area
  - Total: 77.25 km^{2} (29.83 sq mi)
- Elevation: 504 m (1,654 ft)

Population (30 November 2016)
  - Total: 1,574
  - Density: 20.38/km^{2} (52.77/sq mi)
- Demonym: Sambucani
- Time zone: UTC+1 (CET)
  - Summer (DST): UTC+2 (CEST)
- Postal code: 51020
- Dialing code: 0573
- Website: Official website

Sambuca Pistoiese is a town and comune of the Province of Pistoia in the Italian region of Tuscany. The comune is in fact constituted by several different villages (frazioni), the most important of which are Pàvana at 491 metres (1,611 ft) and Treppio at 610 to 750 metres (2,000 to 2,460 ft), along the valley of the Limentra di Sambuca and the Limentra orientale, respectively. The nearest railway station is that of Ponte della Venturina, 1.5 kilometres (0.9 mi) from Pàvana.

== Twin towns ==
Sambuca Pistoiese is twinned with:

- Amgala, Western Sahara
