= Minghetti =

Minghetti is a surname. Notable people with the surname include:

- Angelo Minghetti (1822–1885), Italian ceramist and painter
- Marco Minghetti (1818–1886), Italian economist and statesman
- Prospero Minghetti (1786–1853), Italian painter
