= Lithotope =

Geological term

A lithotope is either an environment in which a sediment was deposited or an area of uniform sedimentation.

1. Surface or area of uniform precipitation. 2. Sediment having a relatively homogeneous sedimentation environment.
