= Limentra di Sambuca =

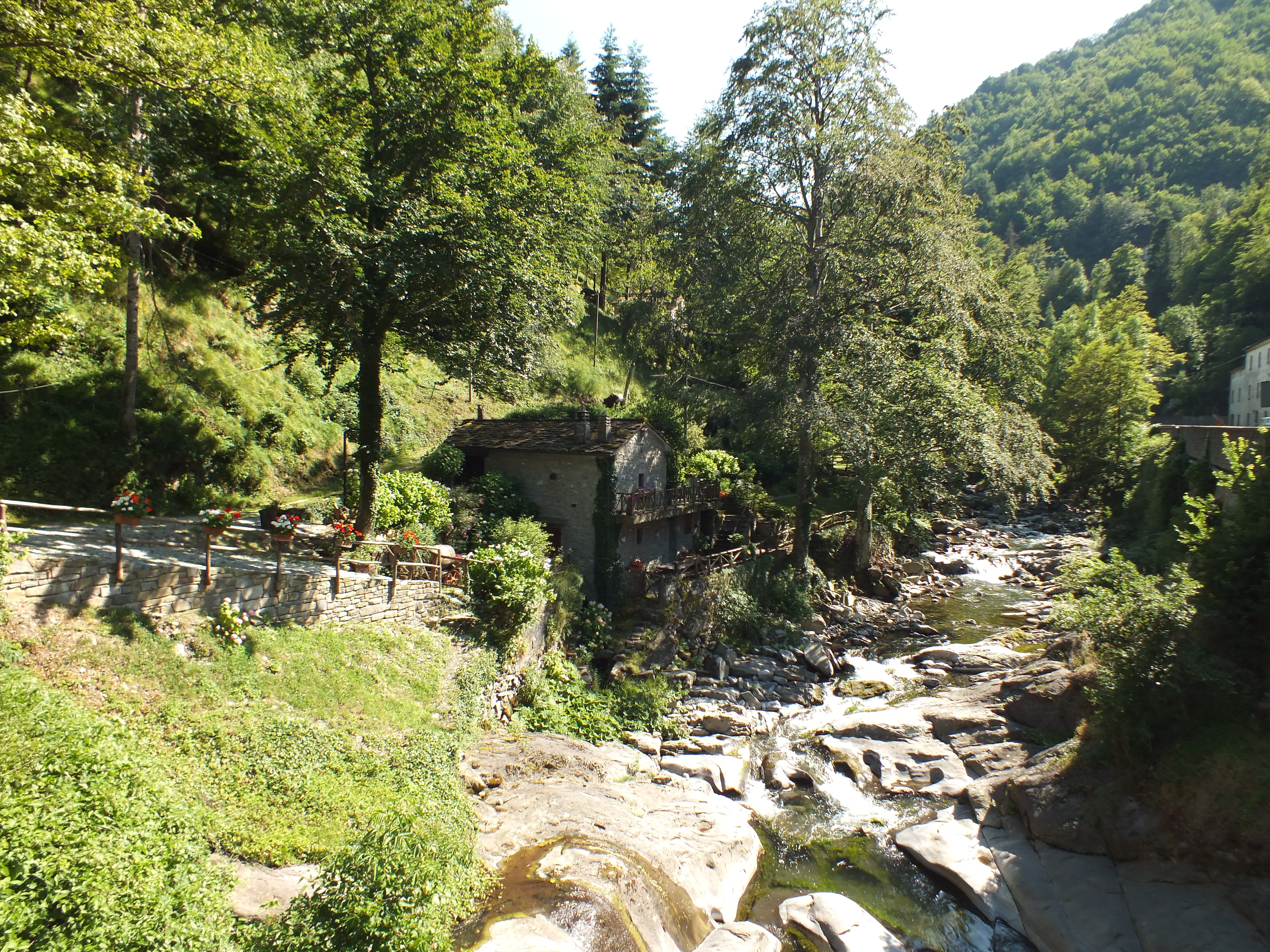

Location
- Country: Italy

Physical characteristics
- Mouth: Reno
  - location: Ponte della Venturina
  - coordinates: 44.1299°N 10.9952°E
- Length: 19.4 km (12.1 mi)

Basin features
- Progression: Reno→ Adriatic Sea

The Limentra di Sambuca (also: Limentra occidentale) is a mountain river in Italy, a right tributary of the Reno. It passes through Sambuca Pistoiese, on the north side of the Apennine Mountains. Its valley runs from southwest to northeast, parallel to the upper valley of the Reno to its west and the Limentrella to its east. It has a length of 19.4 kilometres (12.1 mi) and flows into the Reno near Ponte della Venturina, near the border between Tuscany and Emilia-Romagna.

Its upper valley is part of the Natura 2000 protected area Tre Limentre - Reno. Near Pàvana is a 54 m (177 ft) high dam with a capacity of 900,000 cubic metres (32,000,000 cu ft), built in 1925 and used for hydropower. Part of its water is diverted at Spedaletto towards the aqueduct serving Pistoia.
