= Alto Reno Terme =

- Comune
- Comune di Alto Reno Terme
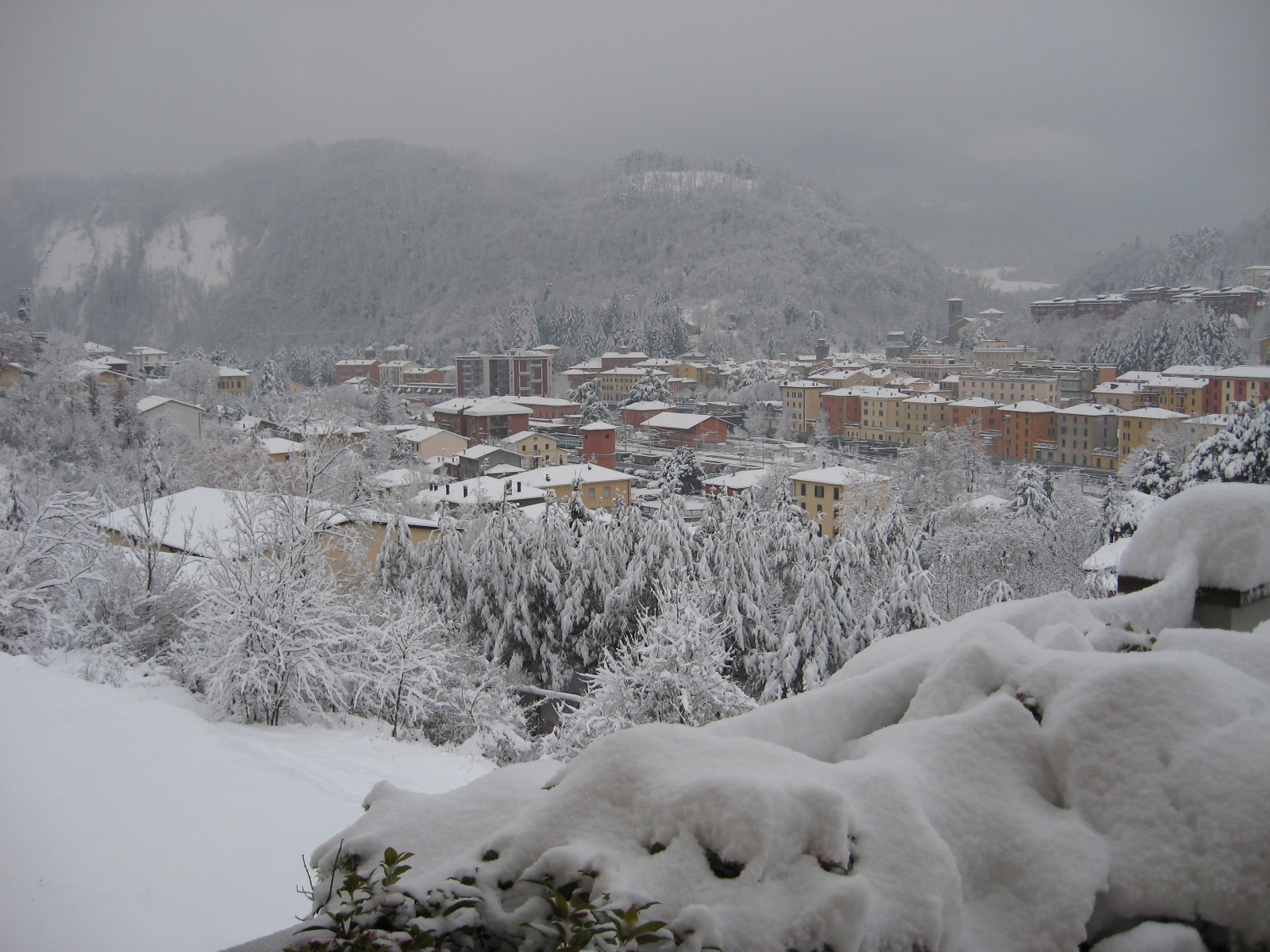
- View of Porretta Terme.

- Location within Italy Location within Emilia-Romagna
- Coordinates: 44°9′37″N 10°58′24″E
- Country: Italy
- Region: Emilia-Romagna
- Metropolitan city: Bologna (BO)
- Frazioni: Biagioni, Borgo Capanne, Capugnano, Casa Calistri, Casa Forlai, Castelluccio, Corvella, Granaglione, Lustrola, Madognana, Molino del Pallone, Ponte della Venturina, Porretta Terme, Vizzero

Government
  - Mayor: Giuseppe Nanni (Centre-left)

Area
  - Total: 73.64 km^{2} (28.43 sq mi)
- Elevation: 349 m (1,145 ft)

Population (1 January 2015)
  - Total: 7,003
  - Density: 95.10/km^{2} (246.3/sq mi)
- Time zone: UTC+1 (CET)
  - Summer (DST): UTC+2 (CEST)
- Dialing code: 0534

Alto Reno Terme is a comune in the Metropolitan City of Bologna, Emilia-Romagna, Italy. It was formed on 1 January 2016, after the merger of Porretta Terme and Granaglione.
