= Camugnano =

- Comune
- Comune di Camugnano
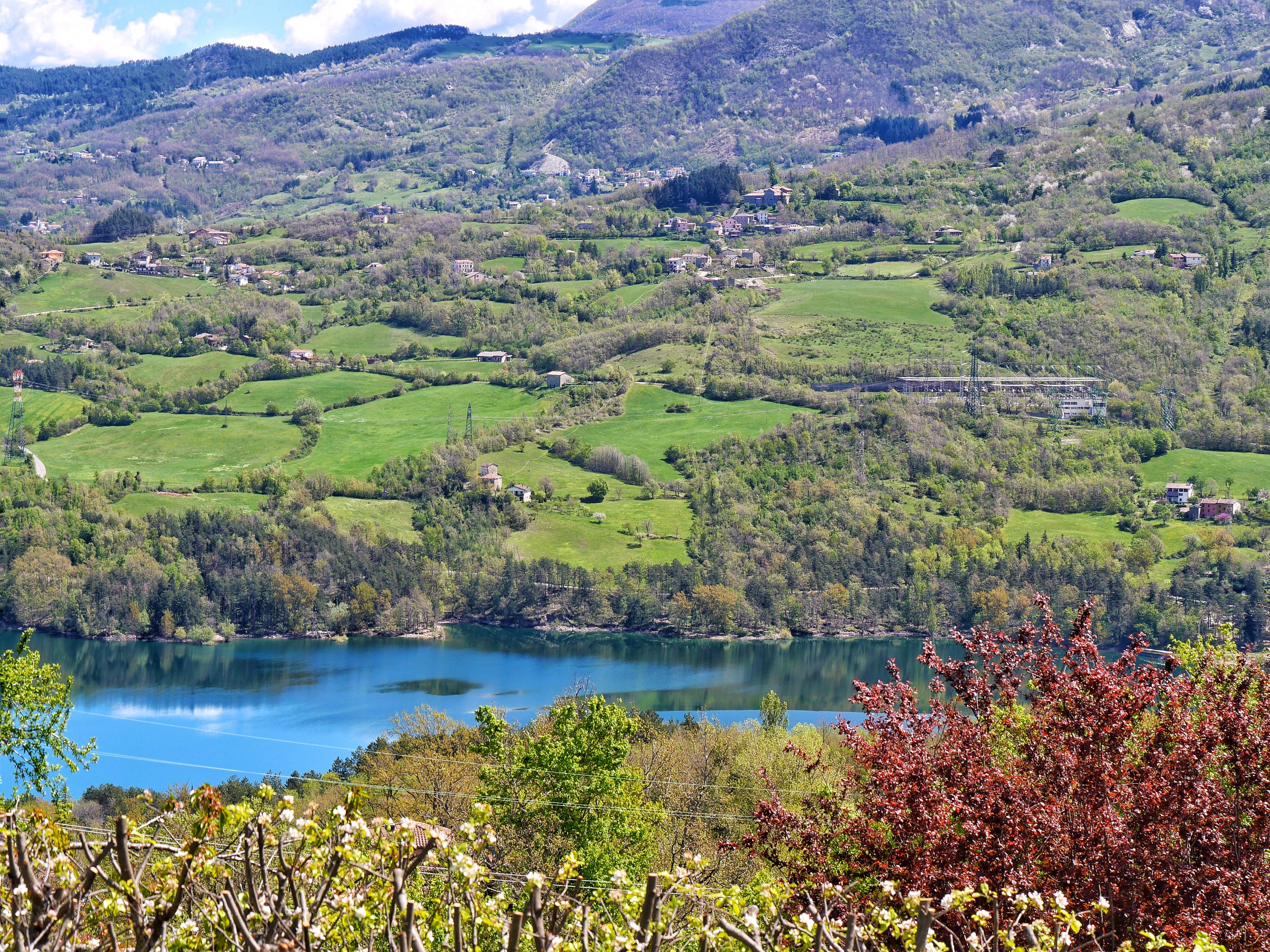

- Location within Italy Location within Emilia-Romagna
- Coordinates: 44°10′N 11°6′E
- Country: Italy
- Region: Emilia-Romagna
- Metropolitan city: Bologna (BO)
- Frazioni: Guzzano, Carpineta, Stagno, Mogne, Verzuno, Vigo, Burzanella, Trasserra, San Damiano, Baigno, Bargi

Government
  - Mayor: Marco Masinara

Area
  - Total: 96.6 km^{2} (37.3 sq mi)
- Elevation: 692 m (2,270 ft)

Population (30 April 2017)
  - Total: 1,830
  - Density: 18.9/km^{2} (49.1/sq mi)
- Demonym: Camugnanesi
- Time zone: UTC+1 (CET)
  - Summer (DST): UTC+2 (CEST)
- Postal code: 40032
- Dialing code: 0534
- Website: Official website

Camugnano (Medial Mountain Bolognese: Camgnèin; City Bolognese: Camugnàn) is a comune (municipality) in the Metropolitan City of Bologna in the Italian region Emilia-Romagna, located about 40 kilometres (25 mi) southwest of Bologna.

Camugnano borders the following municipalities: Cantagallo, Castel di Casio, Castiglione dei Pepoli, Grizzana Morandi, Sambuca Pistoiese, Vernio.
