= Santerno =

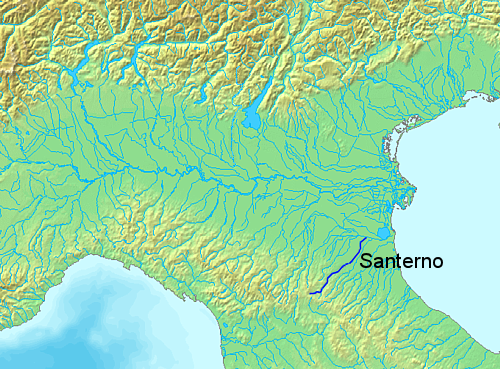
- The Santerno river

Location
- Country: Italy

Physical characteristics
- Source
  - location: Tuscan-Emilian Apennines, Italy
- Mouth: Reno
  - coordinates: 44.5674°N 11.9637°E
- Length: 103 km (64 mi)
- Basin size: about 700 km^{2} (270 mi^{2})
- Discharge
  - average: 16 m^{3}/s (570 cu ft/s)

Basin features
- Progression: Reno→ Adriatic Sea

The Santerno is a river in Romagna in northern Italy. It is a major tributary of the river Reno. In Roman times, it was known as the Vatrenus (small Renus), although, in the Tabula Peutingeriana, it was already identified as the Santernus.

It rises near the Futa Pass, at 1,222 metres (4,009 ft) of elevation, in the Apennine ridges facing the plateau of Firenzuola in the Metropolitan City of Florence. Beyond Firenzuola, it flows northeast through the province of Bologna near Castel del Rio, where it is crossed by a famous medieval bridge, the Ponte degli Alidosi. It then flows past Fontanelice, Borgo Tossignano, Casalfiumanese, and, once in the Pianura Padana (the Po River's valley), Imola. The river forms the border between the province of Bologna and the province of Ravenna for a distance before entering the province of Ravenna. It then empties into the Reno near Argenta.

It is probable that, in ancient times, the river flowed eastward from Bagnacavallo, as confirmed be the existence of a frazione of Ravenna called Santerno. In those days, after Imola, the river divided into two branches, one moving northeast toward Ravenna, the other continuing northward to join the Po. The Ravenna branch disappeared, most likely in the eighth century.

Once the late course of the river was modified, and protective measures were taken in the 1880s, the Santerno was famous for its serious floods. Fourteen were recorded between 1679 and 1778.
