= Sassoleone massacre =

1944 Nazi collective punishment

- Location: 44°15′43.67″N 11°28′58.3″E; Sassoleone, Casalfiumanese, Emilia-Romagna
- Date: 24 September 1944
- Target: Civilians and local partisans
- Deaths: 23 (a municipal list drawn up in 1946 recorded 31 names, but several of these were killed in other episodes)
- Perpetrators: Pionier-Bataillon 80, 44th Infantry Division "Hoch- und Deutschmeister" (Wehrmacht)
- Motive: Reprisal for a partisan ambush on German soldiers

The Sassoleone massacre (Italian: Eccidio di Sassoleone) was a mass killing carried out on 24 September 1944 in Sassoleone, a hamlet (franzione) of the commune of Casalfiumanese in the province of Bologna, Emilia-Romagna, by German occupation forces during the Second World War. The killing was a reprisal for the deaths of a German officer and his driver, who had been shot the previous day in a clash with Italian partisans of the 62nd Garibaldi Brigade. Twenty-three people—mostly the elderly, women and children—were killed, among them the local parish priest, Settimio Patuelli.

The perpetrators were long remembered locally as SS troops, but historical research based on German records has identified the unit responsible as the 80th Pioneer Battalion (Pionier-Bataillon 80) of the German Army's 44th Infantry Division "Hoch- und Deutschmeister". The church bell tower, into which many of the victims had been herded, was mined and exploded over their bodies, while the adjoining 18th-century church was destroyed by bombing during the Allied advance in the following months.

== Historical background ==
Following the Armistice of Cassibile in September 1943, central and northern Italy came under German military occupation, while the Italian Social Republic was established as a collaborationist regime. In this context, partisan resistance movements developed across the occupied territories, waging guerrilla warfare against German forces and their Italian collaborators.

By the summer of 1944, Allied forces advancing from southern Italy reached the Gothic Line, the major German defensive system stretching across the northern Apennines between Tuscany and Emilia-Romagna. German forces, under the command of Albert Kesselring, adopted a strategy of harsh anti-partisan repression, including reprisals against civilians and massacres intended to intimidate the population and deprive the Resistance of support. The line was not broken until April 1945, during the final Allied offensive in northern Italy, which culminated in the liberation of Bologna on 21 April 1945 by Allied troops—among them Polish II Corps and Italian co-belligerent units—together with partisan forces.

Through the autumn of 1944 the front lay across a region of occupiers regarded as hostile and which was at the same time a centre of partisan activity. German units committed numerous war crimes and reprisals against civilians in the area during 1944, including massacres at Cervarolo, Bettola, Fragheto, Tavolicci, Neviano degli Arduini, Strela, San Piero in Bagno, Sassoleone, Ronchidoso di Gaggio Montano, and Sabbiuno. The largest and most widely remembered was the Marzabotto massacre, where some 770 civilians were killed between 29 September and 5 October 1944; the perpetrators of many of these massacres were never brought to trial.

== The massacre ==
At the end of August 1944, a company of the 62nd Garibaldi Brigade "Camicie Rosse", also known as the Pampurio Brigade, managed to take control of Sassoleone. According to the historian Nazario Galassi, the partisans tried to turn Sassoleone into a "free zone", putting in place a local administration inspired by democratic values to address the daily needs of the population in the midst of a civil and world war.

Under conditions of military occupation, communications were often uncertain and extremely dangerous to transmit, and relied on partisan couriers (in Italian, staffette partigiane) - often teenagers and women - who risked their lives to carry messages.

On 23 September, the partisans, having received a message about the conviction of a fellow partisan, attempted to liberate him and attacked a German military truck, killing the driver and one officer, while the remaining soldiers managed to escape. The information about the conviction of their comrade later proved to be false.

Overnight, villagers fearing a possible reprisal fled to the hills surrounding the village; only the elderly and a few women and children remained.

The following day, on 24 September 1944, a German convoy - initially attributed to the SS by local memory and testimonies and later identified as Wehrmacht by historiographic research - reached the area where the truck had been attacked and, after finding nobody in the surrounding buildings, set them on fire. The convoy proceeded towards the village, where the soldiers killed the few people who had not left their homes. More than twenty villagers had sought refuge in the church and its surroundings, including in the rectory, a shelter beneath it, and the bell tower. The soldiers assembled everybody beneath the bell tower and executed them right away. The bell tower was then mined and blown up over the bodies of the victims, and the surrounding buildings were set on fire. Among the victims was Father Settimio Patuelli, a priest from the nearby village of Castel del Rio, who had been temporarily assigned to Sassoleone after the local priest, Don Cassiano Ferri, had left the parish because he was wanted by Nazi-Fascist forces. Tensions had already been running high in the preceding months: on 29 July 1944, Nazi-Fascist forces had set fire to the parish archive as a reprisal.

Sassoleone was occupied by German troops until its liberation by Allied forces on 3 October; only then could the villagers search for their relatives beneath the rubble.

Following the reprisal, the municipality of Casalfiumanese compiled a list of 31 victims. Their names were: Giovanni Arcangeli, Luciana Bacci, Giovanni Banducci, Giorgio Bittini, Arturo Caprara, Cesarina Cella, Margherita Cella, Emma Dalmonte, Elsa Domenicali, Mario Ferretti, Emilia Fiumi, Fiorina Fiumi, Colomba Galassi, Luigi Gambetti, Duilio Ghini, Giuseppina Ghini, Maria Lelli, Francesca Monti, Margherita Morini Fortuzzi, Mario Morini Fortuzzi, Father Settimio Patuelli, Clotilde Poli, Vincenzo Prosperi, Giuseppe Scala, Angela Suzzi, Attilio Suzzi, Anna Maria Tarlazzi, Ettore Tonni, Onesta Turrini, Sante Turrini, and Gisella Wolf.

== Testimonies ==
Giorgio Tonni, Partisan in the 62nd Brigata Garibaldi (1944–1945)

"[...] My parents were killed in the shelter together with their friends. They riddled them with machine-gun fire and then burned the surrounding houses. [...] A family of displaced people from Bologna, consisting of five people (Margherita Cella, aged 64, Gisella Wolf, aged 34, and three children: Mario, aged 12, Margherita, aged 13, and Anna Maria, aged 14) was massacred near the bell tower. Maria Lelli and her mother were killed in their home; they had only enough time to embrace one another and were later found that way beneath the rubble of their destroyed house. [...] The elderly parish priest, Father Settimio Patuelli, who had replaced Father Ferri, joined the victims gathered near the church and the bell tower. He attempted to calm the German troops, but he too was killed while praying, rosary in hand. [...] I immediately ran back into the village and, among the flames and rubble, managed to find my parents, covered in blood, their bodies still warm. Beside them lay the bodies of their friends Arcangeli, Suzzi, and Francesca Monti."

Local partisan account

"[...] We remained holding our breath; in the distance we could see the SS moving through the village. Then a great collective scream was heard, no longer human, followed by bursts of machine-gun fire, and then silence again. [...] Between one explosion and another, as the dust slowly cleared, houses, the church, and public buildings appeared before our eyes completely destroyed. [...] The last fugitives arrived and recounted how around forty elderly people, women, sick people, and children had taken refuge in the bell tower, and how the soldiers, after entering the village, had forced them out of their shelter, lined them up along the wall of the church, and gunned them down with machine-gun fire, indifferent to the cries and laments of the victims."

== Memorials ==
- In front of the rebuilt bell tower of Sassoleone, a memorial stone commemorates the victims.
- The main street of the village is named Via Martiri della Rappresaglia (Street of the Victims of the Reprisal).
