= Cianghella della Tosa =

Florentine (1290–1339)

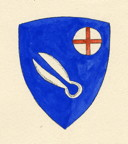
Coat of arms of the Della Tosa family

Cianghella della Tosa (Florence, c. 1290 – 19 March 1339) lived in late medieval Florence, Italy. She was born into the Florentine Della Tosa family and married into the Alidosi family of Imola, near Bologna. Most of what is known about Cianghella is due to her reference in Dante's Divine Comedy.

== Family ==
Cianghella della Tosa was born to Arrigo della Tosa in medieval Florence. Her cousin was Rosso della Tosa, a leader of the Black Guelph Party. She was married to Lippo II degli Alidosi, a lord of Imola. After her husband's death, Cianghella moved back to her home city of Florence, where she is said to have lived a disreputable life.

== A Lady of Ill-Repute ==
Benvenuto da Imola, a commentator of Dante, claimed to have heard horrible things about Cianghella from his neighbor in Imola. He described her as an angry and arrogant woman. Bevenuto claimed Cianghella became an immodest woman on her return to Florence after Lippo's death. In one alleged instance, Cianghella became so infuriated at women who would not move to make room for her at church that she assaulted several of them. This is said to have started a brawl in the church which male churchgoers found so amusing that even the preacher joined in the laughter at the scene. Other rumors indicate that Cianghella would beat her servants with a stick.

== In Dante's Divine Comedy ==
In Canto XV of Paradiso, Dante uses Cianghella as an example of the corrupt nature of Florentine citizens in his time, in contrast to the virtue of the idealized Florence in which his ancestor, Cacciaguida lived in the eleventh century. In lines 126–128, Cacciaguida refers to Cianghella:

As great a marvel then would have been held

A Lapo Salterello, a Cianghella,

As Cincinnatus or Cornelia now.

In this tercet, Cianghella's disreputable lifestyle is compared to the moral stature of Cornelia, a Roman matron who was renowned for her austere virtue. Cacciaguida says that Cianghella would be as shocking to Florence in his time as Cornelia is to fourteenth-century Florentines. Cianghella is also likened to Lapo Salterello, a contemporary Florentine judge known for his corruption.

Critics have noted that Dante's condemnation of Cianghella may be on political rather than purely moralistic grounds. Cianghella belonged to one of the most prominent Black Guelph families, while Dante was a White Guelph. While Dante normally celebrates female chastity and modesty, he also treats positively women who had numerous lovers in their lives, such as Cunizza da Romano, a noblewoman from Treviso, or Rahab, a biblical character and a prostitute. Therefore, it can be hypothesized that Dante treated Cianghella more harshly because of the political alignment of her family. It is also likely that Dante's harsh condemnation of Cianghella as the prototype of corrupted and corrupting women may have influenced the information reported by the commentators of the Divine Comedy, therefore creating the myth of a lady of ill repute.

== In Boccaccio's Corbaccio ==
Giovanni Boccaccio references Cianghella in his work, Corbaccio. In this misogynistic work, Boccaccio identifies a "sect" of women who follow Cianghella's teachings (cianghellina). According to Boccaccio, Cianghella and her sect are said to define wise women as those "who have daring and courage" as well as "lecherous appetites." Using her own language, Boccaccio calls Cianghella a wise woman herself due to her interest in men's sexual, rather than knightly, prowess.
