= Borgo Tossignano =

- Comune
- Comune di Borgo Tossignano
- Coat of arms

- Location within Italy Location within Emilia-Romagna
- Coordinates: 44°17′N 11°35′E
- Country: Italy
- Region: Emilia-Romagna
- Metropolitan city: Bologna (BO)
- Frazioni: Cordignano, Tossignano

Government
  - Mayor: Mauro Ghini

Area
  - Total: 29.1 km^{2} (11.2 sq mi)
- Elevation: 102 m (335 ft)

Population (30 April 2017)
  - Total: 3,272
  - Density: 112/km^{2} (291/sq mi)
- Demonym(s): Borghigiani, Tossignanesi
- Time zone: UTC+1 (CET)
  - Summer (DST): UTC+2 (CEST)
- Postal code: 40021
- Dialing code: 0542
- Website: Official website

Borgo Tossignano (Romagnol: Borg Tusgnàn) is a comune (municipality) in the Province of Bologna in the Italian region Emilia-Romagna, located about 30 km (19 mi) southeast of Bologna.

Borgo Tossignano borders the following municipalities: Casalfiumanese, Casola Valsenio, Fontanelice, Imola, Riolo Terme.

== History ==
The area around Borgo Tossignano had been inhabited for many centuries, with the first settlers probably being from the Villanovian civilization.

It was then settled by the Celts, and Umbri, which long resisted the Roman invasion of the area. The Romans later constructed a strategic defensive fortification on a gypsum edge.

During medieval times, the area was a fortified centre named Castrum Thausignanum (or Tauxignano), documented in 873. It attempted to revolt against its feudal owner, Imola, which destroyed it in 966 and later rebuilt it. In 1005, the governor was Albert of Tossignano, who reigned under Florentine protection. The Florentines attempted many times to conquest the area and remove the Imolese control between 1005 and 1070. Around that time, there was a Pieve dedicated to the Assumption of Mary, whose archpriest was the first vicar general of the Santerno valley.

The local plebeiate then was passed over to Imola, under the control of its diocese in 1126. The area was also involved in the Guelph and Ghibelline wars, which saw the Guelph armies destroying the castle, deporting several inhabitants to Fontana Elice.

The area was then abandoned by those who still resided e eventually settled at the bottom of the valley, creating Borgo.

Bologna then governed the area between 1198 and the early 1300s, reconstructing the castle in 1264 following a victory over Frederick II. The castle, which had returned to its status of vicariate, was then given as a feudal concession to the Alidosi family of Imola until 1424, with Alidosio degli Alidosi being the first governor in 1365.

The area was then administered over the following years by:

- Alberico da Barbiano (1404-1408);
- Ludovico degli Alidosi (1408-1424);
- Guidaccio and Taddeo Manfredi from Faenza (1424-1473);
- Riario-Sforza Family from Imola (1473-1499);
- Cesare Borgia (1500-1503);
- Republic of Venice (1503-1505);
- Ricciardo Alidosi from Castel del Rio, Ramazzotto dei Ramazzotti from Scaricalasino, the Carafa Family from Naples, and the nephews of Pope Paul IV (1506-1560);
- Count Federico Borromei (1560-1565);
- The Altemps Family from Germany (1565-1700): they were the family who held the area for the longest time, built the Church of San Michele and repaired the walls;
- The Marquis Spada from Bologna (1700-1757);
- Marquis Francesco Martelli Tartagni from Forlì (1757-1797), removed from power during the Napoleonic Wars.

== Twin towns ==
Borgo Tossignano is twinned with:

- Ripalimosani, Italy
