= Palazzo Alidosi =

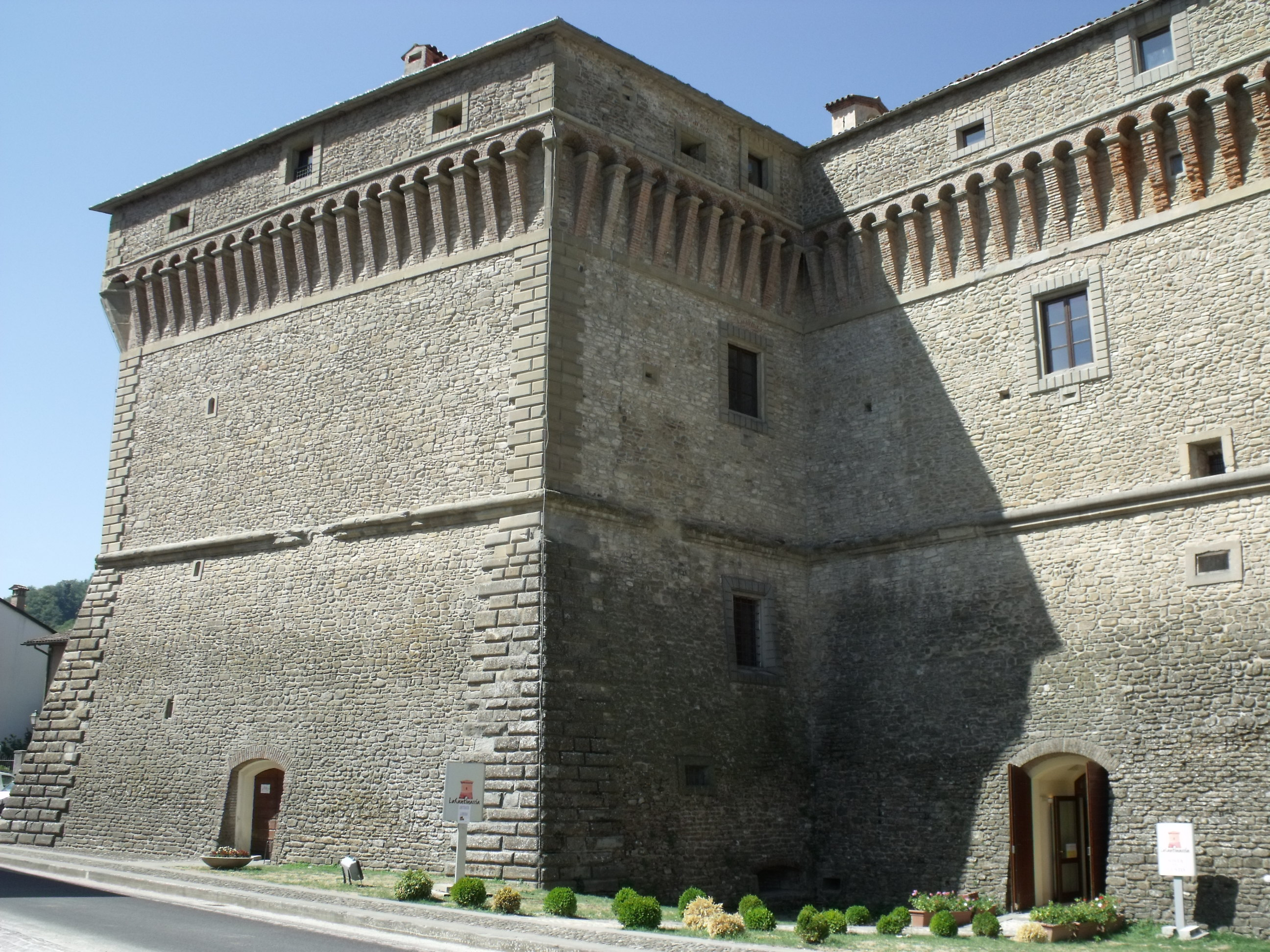
- Palazzo Alidosi in Castel del Rio
- Interactive map of the Palazzo Alidosi area

General information
- Architectural style: Renaissance
- Location: Castel del Rio, Bologna, Emilia-Romagna, Italy
- Coordinates: 44°12′47″N 11°30′16″E
- Construction started: 1499
- Completed: c. 1542

Design and construction
- Architect: Francesco da Sangallo

Palazzo Alidosi is a 16th-century palace in Castel del Rio, Italy, built as a combined fortress and residence for the noble Alidosi family. It stands as a well-preserved example of Renaissance military architecture, with its unique diamond-shaped bastions and Renaissance courtyard.

== Historical Background ==
The Alidosi family ruled over the region from the 13th to the 17th century. Their first residence, Castrum Rivi, was built between the 13th and 14th centuries further upstream from the current palace site. Today, only the ruins of this original settlement remain, known as the castellaccio. Due to the decline of this early castle, Cesare and Rizzardo Alidosi commissioned the construction of a new palace in the town center, a project begun in the early 16th century.

== Construction and Architecture ==
Construction of Palazzo Alidosi began in the early 1500s under the patronage of Cardinal Francesco Alidosi to symbolize the family's power and influence. The work was continued by Cesare and his uncle Rizzardo Alidosi and was completed around 1542. The palace was initially designed to be a square “palazzo-fortezza,” or palace-fortress, featuring four prominent diamond-shaped bastions, a large internal courtyard surrounded by a loggia of 24 sandstone columns, and a central well. A wide moat surrounded the palace, which was accessed via a three-arched bridge.

However, due to financial and logistical challenges, the palace was left incomplete, with only two of the four bastions ever built. The palace's courtyard, known as the Cortiletto delle Fontane ("Courtyard of the Fountains"), is a Renaissance jewel featuring three beautifully crafted shell-shaped sandstone fountains. It is framed by a loggia supported by three sandstone columns. Frescoes painted by Giuseppe Pasini in 1568 adorn the courtyard's walls. The loggia contains eight circular niches, which once held marble busts of prominent Alidosi family members, although today only the bust of Lito Alidosi, Bishop of Imola and Cervia in the early 14th century, remains.

=== Designer ===
There has been some debate over the architect responsible for Palazzo Alidosi. While some historians credit Donato Bramante, others suggest Francesco da Sangallo as the designer, and current consensus tends to favor the latter. The architectural style of the palace demonstrates features typical of military fortresses from the late 15th century, adapted to defend against contemporary artillery advances.

== Decline and restoration ==
Following the deaths of Cesare and Rizzardo Alidosi, work on the palace ceased, leaving the southwest and northwest bastions unfinished. The palace subsequently fell into decline after Castel del Rio became part of the Papal States in 1683 under Pope Urban VIII. By the 19th century, the building was in complete disrepair. In 1841, the town assumed responsibility for its maintenance, and by 1877, it had become the sole owner.

The palace underwent several restorations over the years to preserve its historical and architectural significance. Today, Palazzo Alidosi serves as the municipal seat of Castel del Rio and hosts the town's library, the Museum of the War and Gothic Line, and the Museo del Castagno (Museum of the Chestnut), along with the environmental education center, the "Animal Tower."
