= Lippo (given name) =

Lippo is an Italian historical male name and it represents a diminutive of Filippo (usually Pippo in Italy nowadays). It may refer to:

- Lippo I Alidosi (14th century), Lord of Imola
- Lippo II Alidosi (died 1350), Lord of Imola
- Lippo Hertzka (1904–1951), Hungarian footballer
- Lippo Lippi (c. 1406–1469), Italian painter
- Lippo Memmi (c. 1291–1356), Italian painter
- Lippo Vanni (14th century), Italian painter
