= Bettisia Gozzadini =

Italian legal academic (1209–1261)

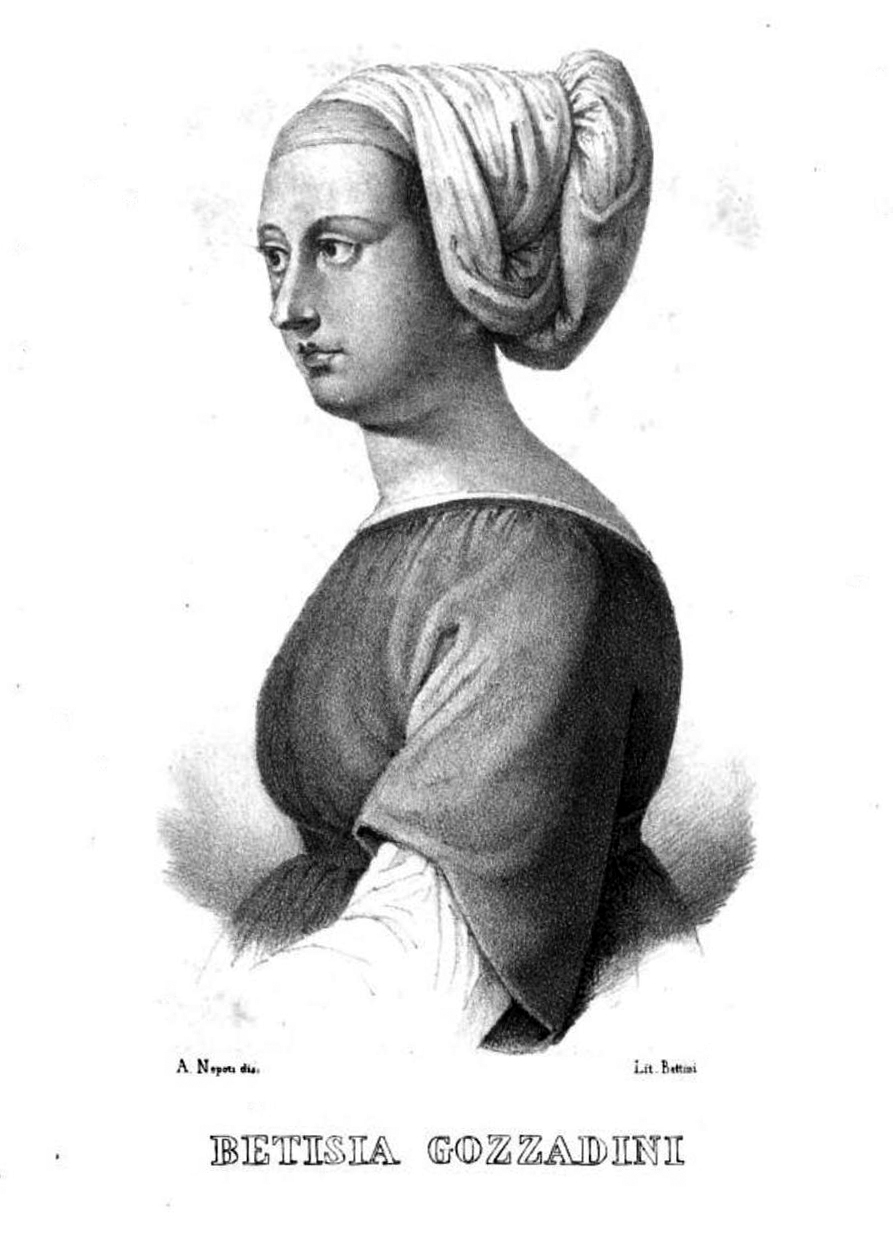
- Nineteenth-century lithograph depicting Gozzadini; no life portraits are known
- Born: 1209; Bologna
- Died: 2 November 1261 (aged 51–52); Budrio
- Other names: Battisia Gozzadini; Betina Gozzadina; Bitisia Gozzadina; Bitisia Gozzadini
- Occupation: Jurist
- Known for: Reputedly the first woman to lecture at a university

Bettisia Gozzadini (Note: also Bitisia, Biltisia and Beatrix) (1209 – 2 November 1261), was an Italian jurist who lectured at the University of Bologna from about 1239. She is thought to be the first woman to have taught at a university.

== Life ==
Gozzadini was born in the commune of Bologna in northern Italy in 1209; her parents, Amadore Gozzadini and Adelasia de' Pegolotti, were of the nobility. Gozzadini studied philosophy, and then studied law under Giacomo Baldavino and Tancred of Bologna at the Studium of Bologna, where she also received encouragement from Odofredo. As a young woman, she dressed as a man; it is not known whether this was because of social pressures or was from personal choice.

She graduated from the university in 1237, and for two years taught law at her home. She was offered chair at the Studium, which she at first declined but later accepted. According to legend, she had to wear a veil when teaching, to avoid distraction to her students; however, the same legend is also attached to Novella d'Andrea, and it is not known which – if either – it belongs to.

Gozzadini was a noted orator, and on 31 May 1242 she gave the oration at the funeral of the Bishop of Bologna, Enrico della Fratta.

Gozzadini died with two other women and four students on 2 November 1261, when flooding of the Idice caused the collapse of the house where they had taken refuge after fleeing from her villa on the river between Mezzolara and Riccardina, now in the comune of Budrio to the east of Bologna. There was general mourning in the city and the schools were closed. Her funeral was held at the church of the Padri Serviti.

== Reception ==
Gozzadini is thought to be the first woman to have taught at a university. Her reputation as a lawyer may be founded in part on an eighteenth-century treatise on doctorates for women written by Alessandro Macchiavelli, who is believed to have filled gaps in his knowledge by fabrication.

A terracotta bust of her, one of a series of twelve representations of notable Bolognese women by the un-named "Scultore di Casa Fibbia", dates from the late seventeenth century. It was originally in the Salone d'Onore of Palazzo Fibbia Fabbri – now Palazzo Masetti Calzolari – and is now in the Museo della Storia di Bologna in Palazzo Pepoli. Gozzadini is the earliest of the twelve women depicted.

Her writings, on the Digest and on the lex omnes populi, are believed lost.
