= Sassoleone =

Village in Emilia-Romagna, Italy

Coordinates: 44°15′39″N 11°28′59″E

Sassoleone is a hilltop village in the Apennine Mountains of north-central Italy, (about 440 meters above sea-level). The village belongs to the municipality of Casalfiumanese, about 40 kilometers south-east of the metropolitan city of Bologna, in the region of Emilia-Romagna.

== History ==
The area was first mentioned in church documents in AD 1127. The local Catholic church, (St. Prosepero) was built during this time. The land was owned by various noble families through the centuries, (the Bolognese, the Alidosi and the Florentines). By the late 14th Century the land fell into direct control of the Holy See.

During the Second World War, Sassoleone was part of the German "Gothic Line". During a reprisal operation, twenty-four villagers were seized by soldiers and shot in front of the old church. The church and its bell tower were then blown up.

The Allies would free the village in March 1945, just before the April Spring Offensive to take Bologna.

After the war, the church was rebuilt. In front of the new church and bell tower there is a stone memorial commemorating the event. The road that leads to the church, previously called "via Castello", has been renamed "via Martiri della Rappresaglia".

== April Festival ==
Every first Sunday of April, Sassoleone holds a pole-climbing contest in the village square for both adults and children. Another tradition is the throwing of sweets or biscuits out the windows of buildings for children. (Sagra della cuccagna).

== Economy ==
Sassoleone consists mainly of farmers and small businesses. The village has recently become popular for its Agri-Tourism where vacationers can stay at nearby farms during their holidays.

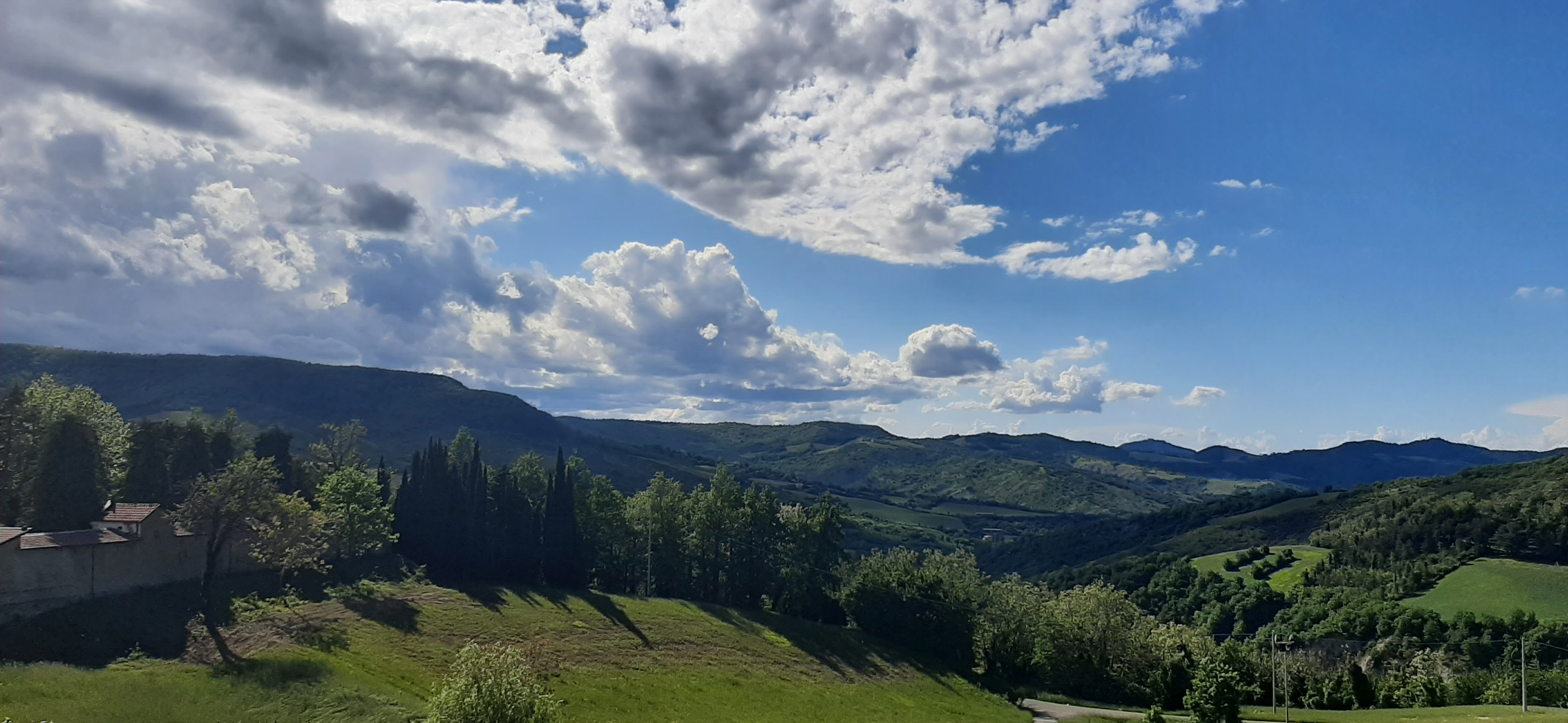
Panorama of the mountains near Sassoleone
