= Lipparini =

Lipparini is an Italian surname, etymologically connected to Lippo, a diminutive of Filippo. It has been common in Emillia, especially in Bologna. Notable people with the surname include:

- Caterina Lipparini (1793–1851), Italian opera singer
- Giovanni Lipparini (died 1788), Italian sculptor
- Giuseppe Lipparini (1877–1951), Italian literary
- Ludovico Lipparini (1800–1856), Italian painter
