= Alidosi family =

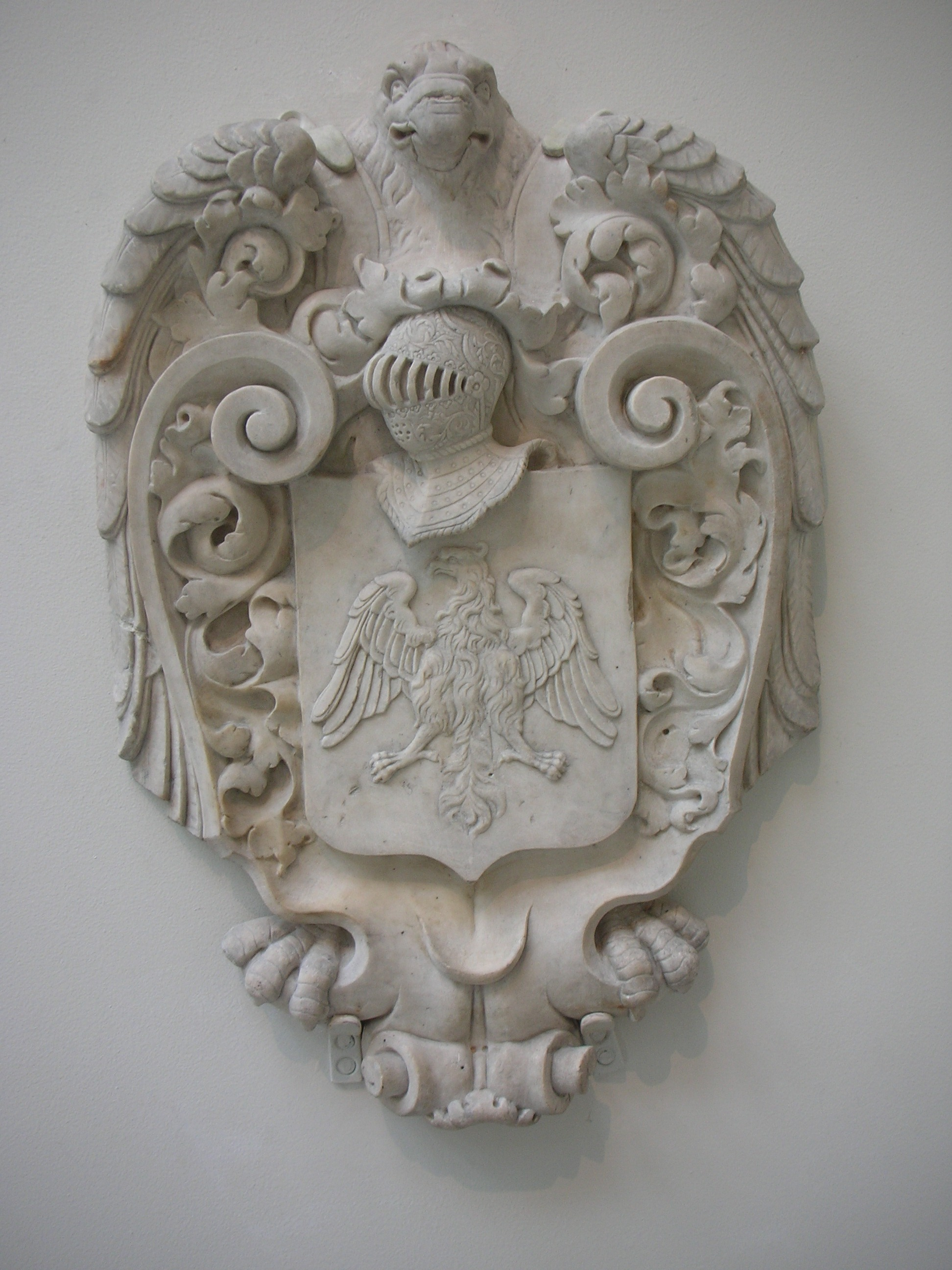
Stemma (Italian: coat-of-arms) of the Alidosi family from former Palazzo Alidosi at Cesena in Italy. Istrian stone, Medieval and Renaissance Gallery, Victoria & Albert Museum, London.

The Alidosi or Alodosi are a family of Romagna, Italy, who held the signoria of the city of Imola during the Late Middle Ages. They were originary of the Santerno valley.

== History ==
During the 13th century, the Alidosi supported the Guelph cause during the Guelphs and Ghibellines conflicts.

The Alidosis ruled Imola beginning with 1341, when Pope Benedict XII turned the city and its territory over to Lippo II Alidosi with the title of pontifical vicar. The family would rule the city until 1424, when it would be stripped from them by Filippo Maria Visconti, forcing them to retreat to the countryside seigniory of Castel del Rio, in the Romagna Apennines.

Several members of the Alidosi family were employed by the Grand Duke of Tuscany which put them at odds with the Papal States and the Roman Inquisition. In 1608, Rodrigo, the then head of the family, was accused of various offences, chief among them protecting Germans. This resulted in a lengthy trial which saw the Grand Duke clash with the prosecuting efforts of the Inquisition.

They were ultimately ousted from the Castel del Rio in 1638 by Pope Urban VIII.

== Notable members ==
Another notable member was Cardinal Francesco Alidosi (1455–1511), who was a friend of Pope Julius II. He is mentioned by several sources as having been appointed Cardinal protector of England in 1509, but this appointment "cannot be exactly established" as his only surviving letters to England do not mention the protectorate. He was murdered in 1511 by members of the Duke of Urbino's entourage, after being accused of treason.

== Alidosi rulers of Imola ==
- Roberto Alidosi (986-1001)
- Ugolino Alidosi (1029–1032)
- Riccardo Alidosi (1032–1046)
- Ranieri Alidosi (1046–1054)
- Lippo I Alidosi (de facto, 1278–1288)
- Alidosio Alidosi (1290–1293 and 1302–1311)
- Lippo II Alidosi (1334–1350)
- Roberto Alidosi (1350–1362)
- Azzo Alidosi (1362–1363 and 1365–1372)
- Bertrando Alidosi (1372–1391)
- Luigi Alidosi (1391–1424)
- Lippo Alidosi (associated 1391-1396)
