= Azzo Alidosi =

Italian condottiero and nobleman

Azzo Alidosi (died 1372) was an Italian condottiero and a lord of Imola.

The son of Roberto Alidosi, he was governor of Fermo in 1364–1367, and succeeded his father in Imola after his death. Named papal vicar of the city under the control of Cardinal Gil de Albornoz, he had first to face a rebellion of his brother Bertrando, whose result was that both were brought to Bologna by the papal forces. He could return to Imola in 1364. The following year he had to quench another rebellion of the Imolese, only to be jailed in Bologna by the papal legate in 1366; he could return in the same year.

He married two times: with Rengarda Manfredi, from the ruling family of Faenza, and with Margherita di Castelbarco.

He died in 1372.

== Sources ==
- Page at condottieridiventura.it (in Italian)

Preceded by Roberto Alidosi	Lord of Imola; 1362–1363	Succeeded by To the Papal States
Preceded by To the Papal States	Lord of Imola; 1365–1372	Succeeded by Bertrando Alidosi
