= Palazzo Pepoli Campogrande, Bologna =

Coordinates: 44.4929°N 11.3462°E

Palazzo Pepoli Campogrande
- Interactive map of the Palazzo Pepoli Campogrande area

General information
- Location: Bologna, Italy, Bologna
- Construction started: 1650s

The Palazzo Pepoli Campogrande, also known as Palazzo Pepoli Nuovo, is a Baroque style palace on Via Castiglione 7 in central Bologna, region of Emilia-Romagna, Italy. In 2015, it served as a public art gallery for late-Baroque art. Across the Via, rises the medieval Palazzo Pepoli Vecchio, also once pertaining to the same family, which now serves as a museum of the history of Bologna.

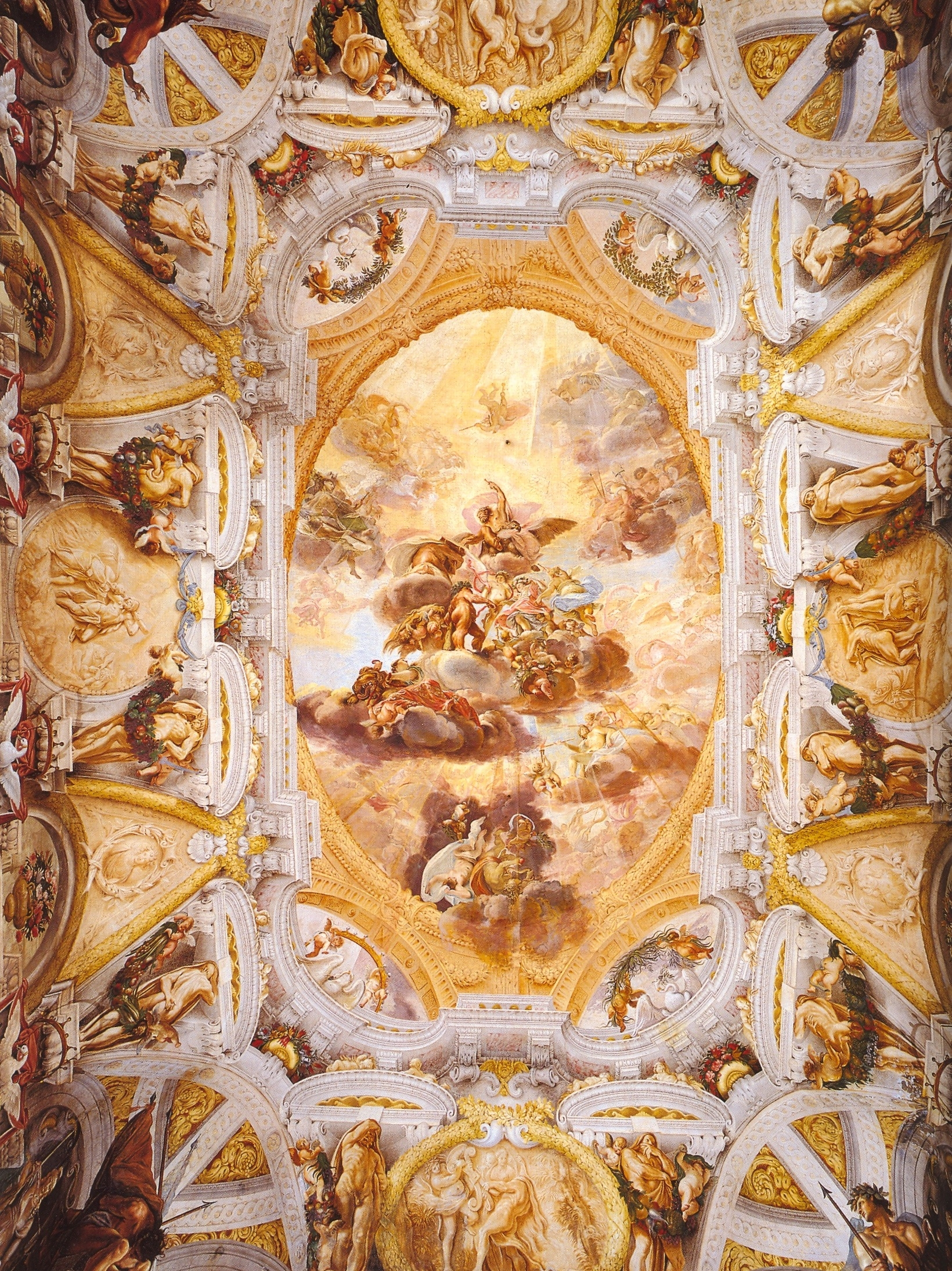
Apotheosis of Hercules, ceiling fresco by Canuti.

== History ==
The palace was built in the mid-1600s by designs by Francesco Albertoni and Giuseppe Antonio Torri, and commissioned by Count Odoardo Pepoli of the aristocratic Pepoli family. In the 20th century, the new owner Edvige Campogrande donated this floor to the city for the establishment of a museum.

The entrance has monumental staircase leading to a piano nobile with frescoed rooms. The ceiling of the staircase has two ovals (1665) framed by stucco and painted by Domenico Maria Canuti, depicting the Nomination of Taddeo Pepoli to be a Lord (Senator) of Bologna and when Taddeo Confirmed as Apostolic Vicar of the Pope.

The ceilings are decorated with frescoes:

- The Salone d'onore (Hall of Honor) has a ceiling fresco depicting the 'Apotheosis of Hercules on the Olympus by Canuti on a quadratura background by il Mengazzino.
- The Sala di Felsina has a round Allegory of Felsina (Bologna) (1680) by Giuseppe and Antonio Rolli.
- The Sala delle Stagione (Hall of the Seasons) depicts the Four Seasons with the Transit of Hercules painted by Giuseppe Maria Crespi.
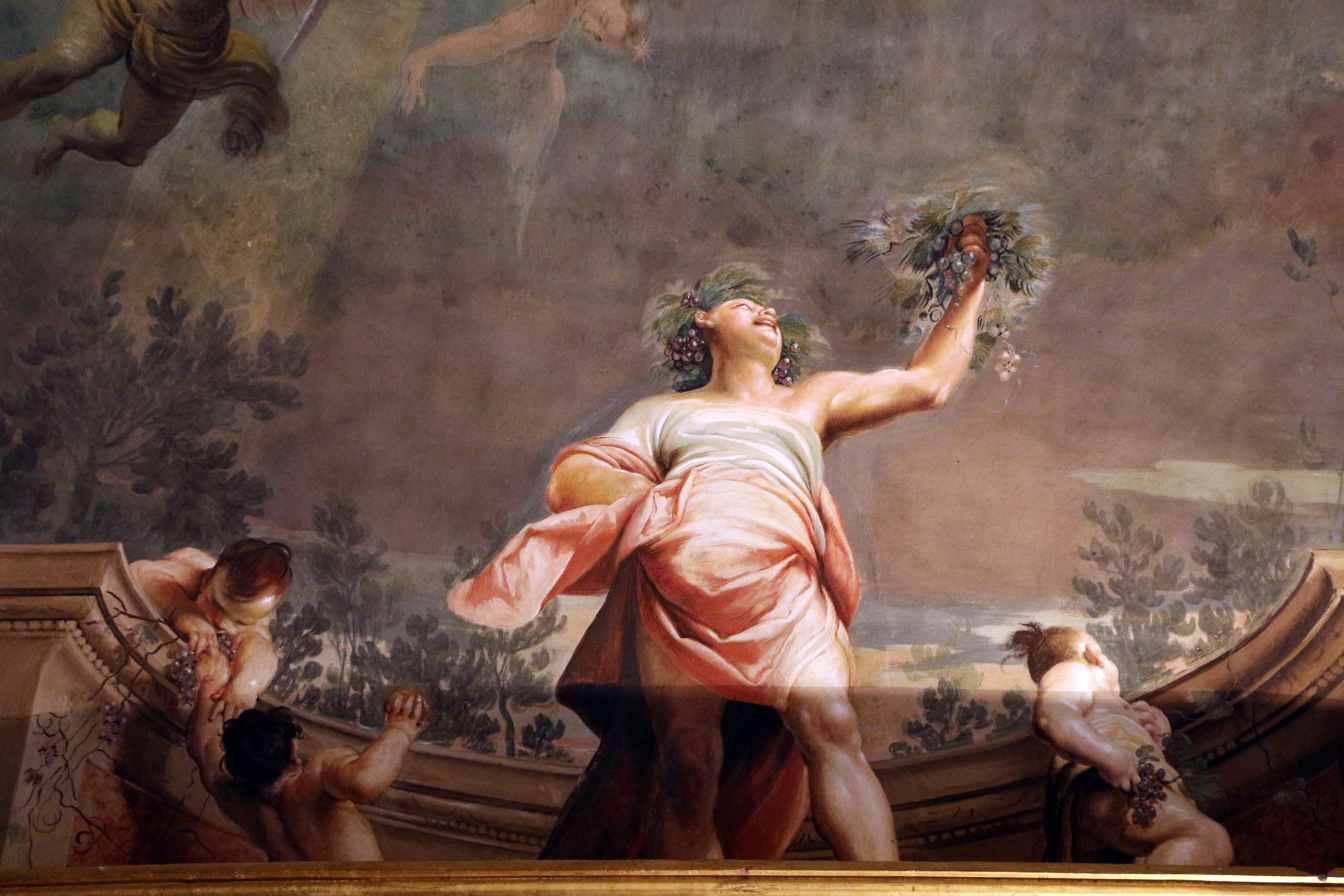
Spring

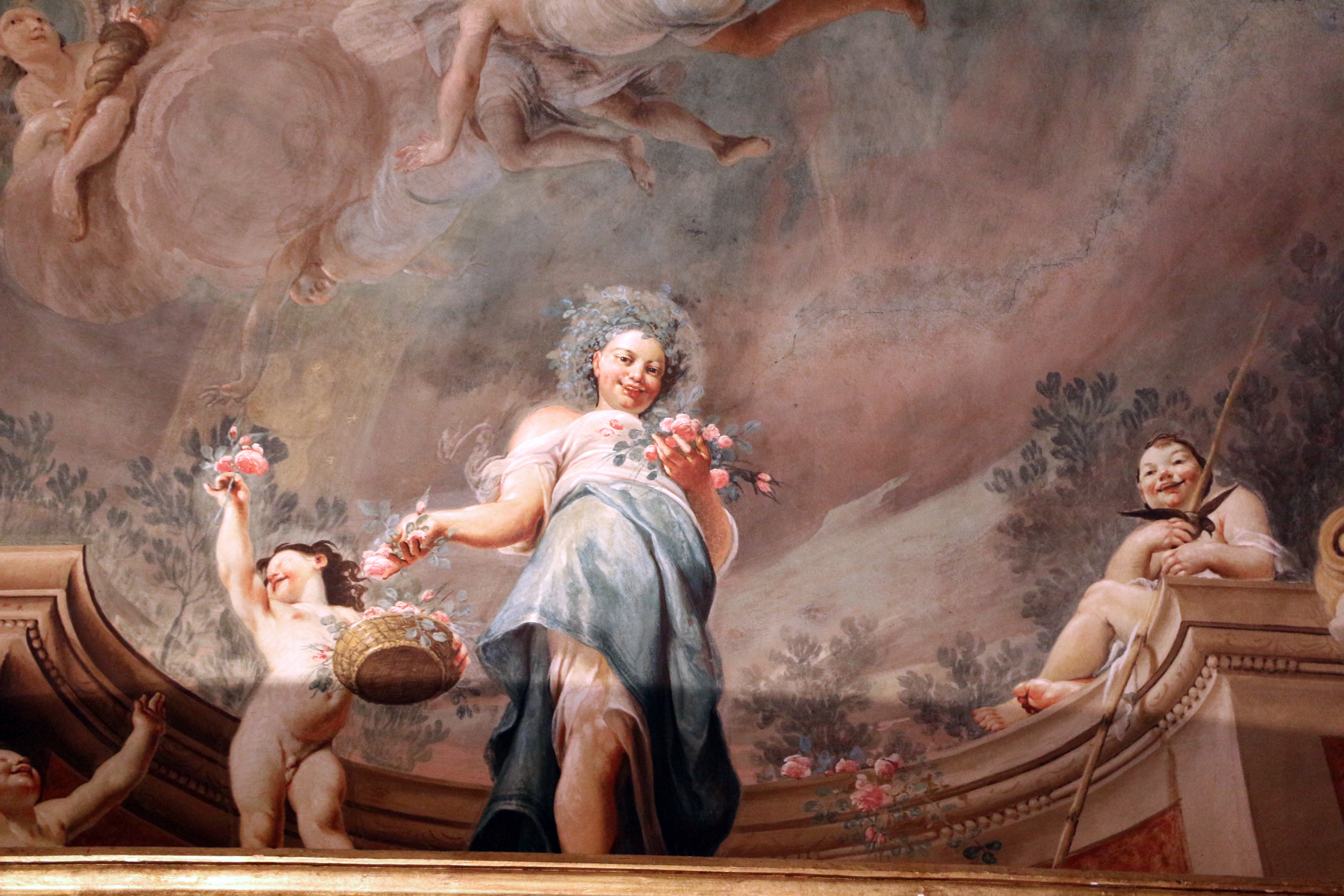
Summer

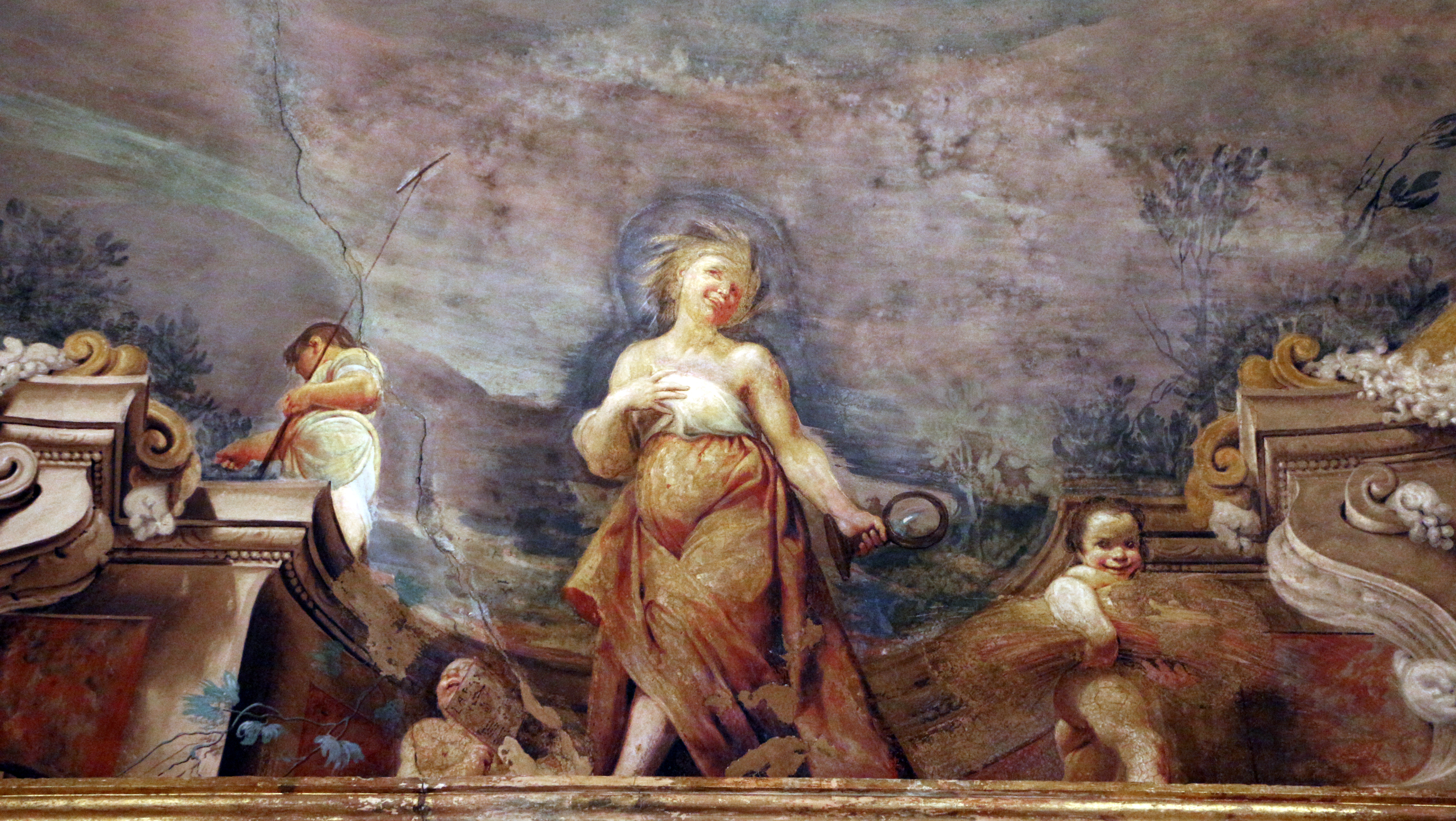
Fall

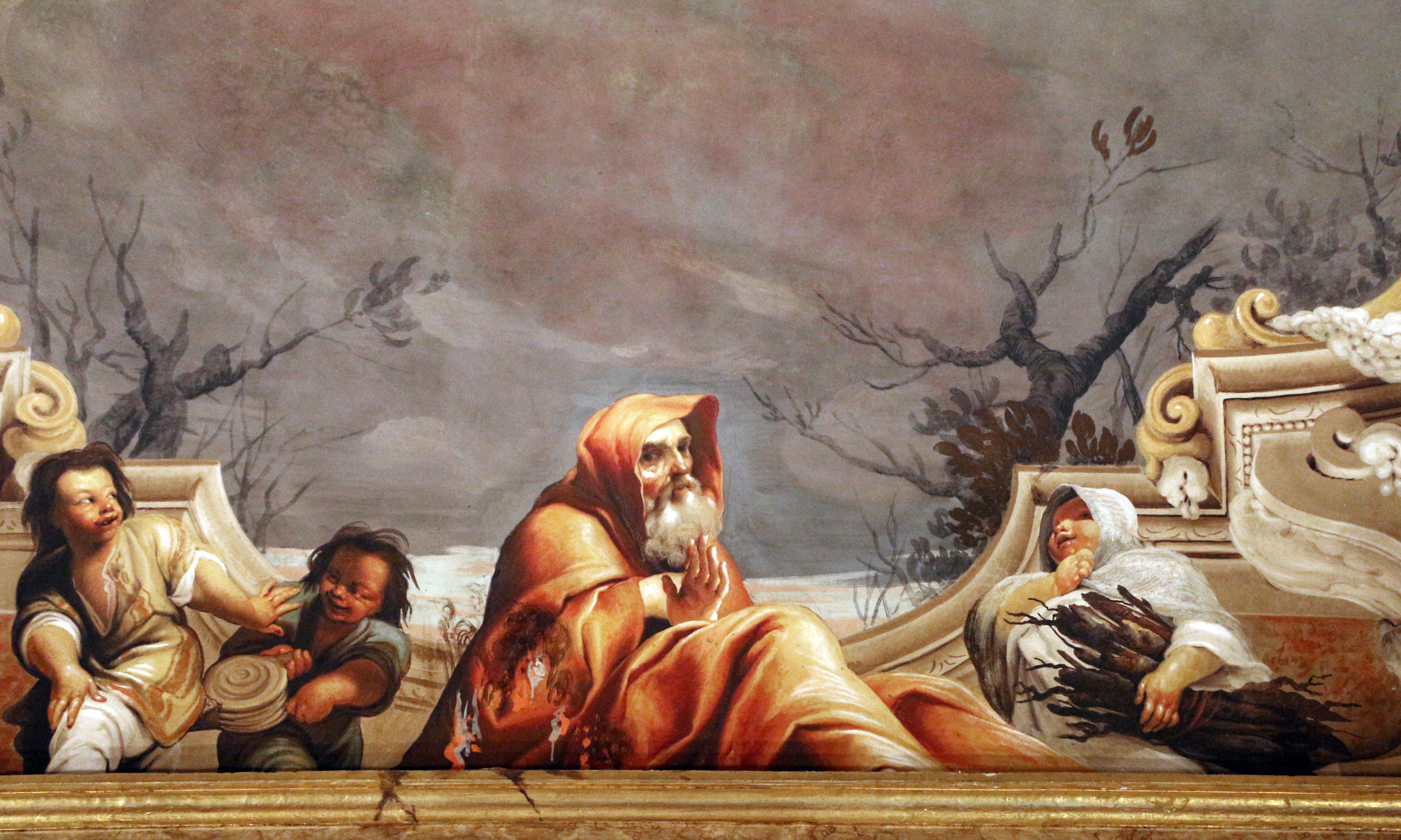
Winter
- The Sala dell'Olimpo is decorated with a Gods of Olympus also by Crespi.
- The Sala di Alessandro was frescoed with an Alexander severing the Gordian knot by Donato Creti.

The walls of these rooms display a collection of paintings, the core of which arose from the canvases assembled by the Zambeccari family; this collection was once located in Palazzo Zambeccari. In 1788, the paintings was willed to a public museum by marchese Giacomo Zambeccari, and became part of the Pinacoteca of Bologna in 1884. Over the time the display was augmented by a selection of other mainly baroque works. Among the painters in the collection are Crespi, Ludovico Carracci, Guercino, Marcantonio Franceschini, Donato Creti, Titian, Giovanni Battista Langetti, Bernardo Strozzi, Giovanni Battista Piazzetta, and Palma il Giovane. The collection also has Flemish and Byzantine works.
