= Giugnola =

- Frazione
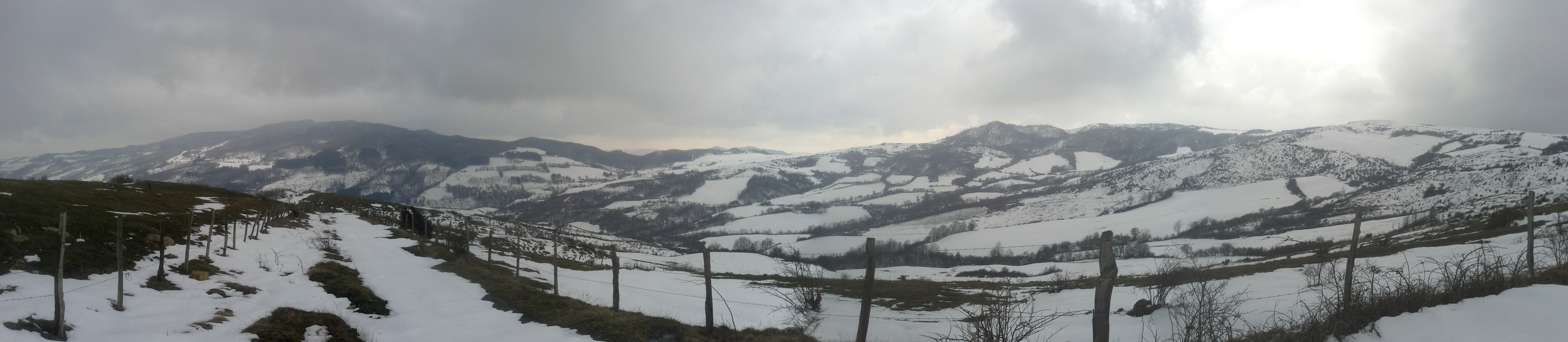

- Location of Giugnola in Italy
- Coordinates: 44°13′14″N 11°27′04″E
- Country: Italy
- Region: Emilia-Romagna; Tuscany
- Province: Bologna (BO); Florence (FI)
- Comune: Castel del Rio; Firenzuola
- Elevation: 511 m (1,677 ft)

Population (2011)
  - Total: 67
- Demonym: Giugnolesi
- Time zone: UTC+1 (CET)
  - Summer (DST): UTC+2 (CEST)
- Postal code: 40022 (Castel del Rio); 50033 (Firenzuola)
- Dialing code: 0542 (Castel del Rio); 055 (Firenzuola)

Giugnola is a village in central Italy, administratively divided into two frazioni of the two municipalities of Castel del Rio (in Emilia-Romagna) and Firenzuola (in Tuscany). As of 2001, it had 67 inhabitants, 33 in the Castel del Rio's frazione, and 34 in the Firenzuola's one.

== Geography ==
Although it is not uncommon, in Italy, to find a village divided into two (or more) municipalities, or (rarely) into two provinces; Giugnola represents a rare case of a frazione divided into 2 regions.

It is located on the Tuscan Apennine, 2 km far from Piancaldoli, 10 from Castel del Rio, 25 from Firenzuola, 57 from Bologna, 73 from Prato and 93 from Florence.

== Personalities ==
- Antonio Bacci (1885-1971), Roman Catholic Cardinal
- Leto Casini (1902-1992), Catholic Righteous Among the Nations
