= Bertrando Alidosi =

Italian military leader

Bertrando Alidosi (died 12 November 1391) was an Italian condottiere and the Lord of Imola(as Papal vicar) from 1372 until 1391. He was the son of Roberto Alidosi, and succeeded in his signoria to Azzo Alidosi, to whom he had been associated by will of Pope Urban V. In 1365 he had been also made lord of Castel del Rio, Monte del Fine and Castiglione. The two brothers were jailed in Bologna two times by the papal forces, but they were permitted to return soon to Imola. In 1371 he was forced by a rebellion to flee shortly at Avignon with Pope Gregory XI.

He was succeeded by his son Luigi (Ludovico).

== Marriage ==
He married Elisa Tarlati, daughter of Maso Tarlati, lord of Pietramala and Rengarda Malatesta, and sister of cardinal Galeotto Tarlati. They had the following issue

- Ludovico (or Luigi) Alidosi, married to Elisa Tarlati
- Rengarda Alidosi, married to Andrea Malatesta of Cesena
- Caterina Alidosi, married to Riccardo Alidosi of Faenza
- Lippo Alidosi (d. 1405)
- Giovanna Alidosi, married to Bartolomeo Brancaleoni, Signore di Casteldurante

Preceded by Azzo Alidosi	Lord of Imola; 1372–1391	Succeeded by Luigi Alidosi
