= Pepoli =

Aristocratic banking family of Bologna, Italy

- Noble family
- Country: Comune of Bologna
- Estates: Palazzo Pepoli Vecchio, Bologna; Palazzo Pepoli Campogrande, Bologna; Torretta Pepoli, Erice, Sicily

The Pepoli family was an Italian aristocratic banking family of Bologna, in northern Italy. They were lords of the city for thirteen years in the fourteenth century. A branch of the family moved to Trapani in Sicily and were granted several feudal lordships and baronies.

== History ==
=== Origins ===
The presence of the family in Bologna seems to have been documented since the last decade of the eleventh century. The testament of Romeo Pepoli's Zerra, written by Rolandino de 'Passaggeri on 8 October 1251, shows the presence of the family in the area of via Castiglione at that time. From the beginning, the Pepoli had established a prominent banking house in Bologna and became among the richest families in Italy at that time. For this reason, the chessboard used to count the relationship between different coins was adopted as the family's coat of arms. After years of private financial activity, the family eventually took a leading role in the political scene of the city.

=== Lordship of Bologna ===
The House of Pepoli reached its apogee in the first half of the 14th century. The family took power as Lords of Bologna during the chaotic struggles between Guelfs and Ghibellines in the city. In August, 1337, Taddeo Pepoli orchestrated an armed occupation of the city and gained support for his election as Lord of Bologna. While initially reluctant to acknowledge Pepoli, Pope Benedict XII sent the bishop of Como, a Paravicini, to the city. The papal nuncio delivered the keys of the city to Taddeo, appointing him papal vicar for a three-year term. With this title Taddeo obtained the legitimacy to his office. These episodes are commemorated in two ovals frescoed in the 17th century by Canuti in the stairwell entrance of the Palazzo Pepoli Campogrande, across the street from the Palazzo Pepoli Vecchio.

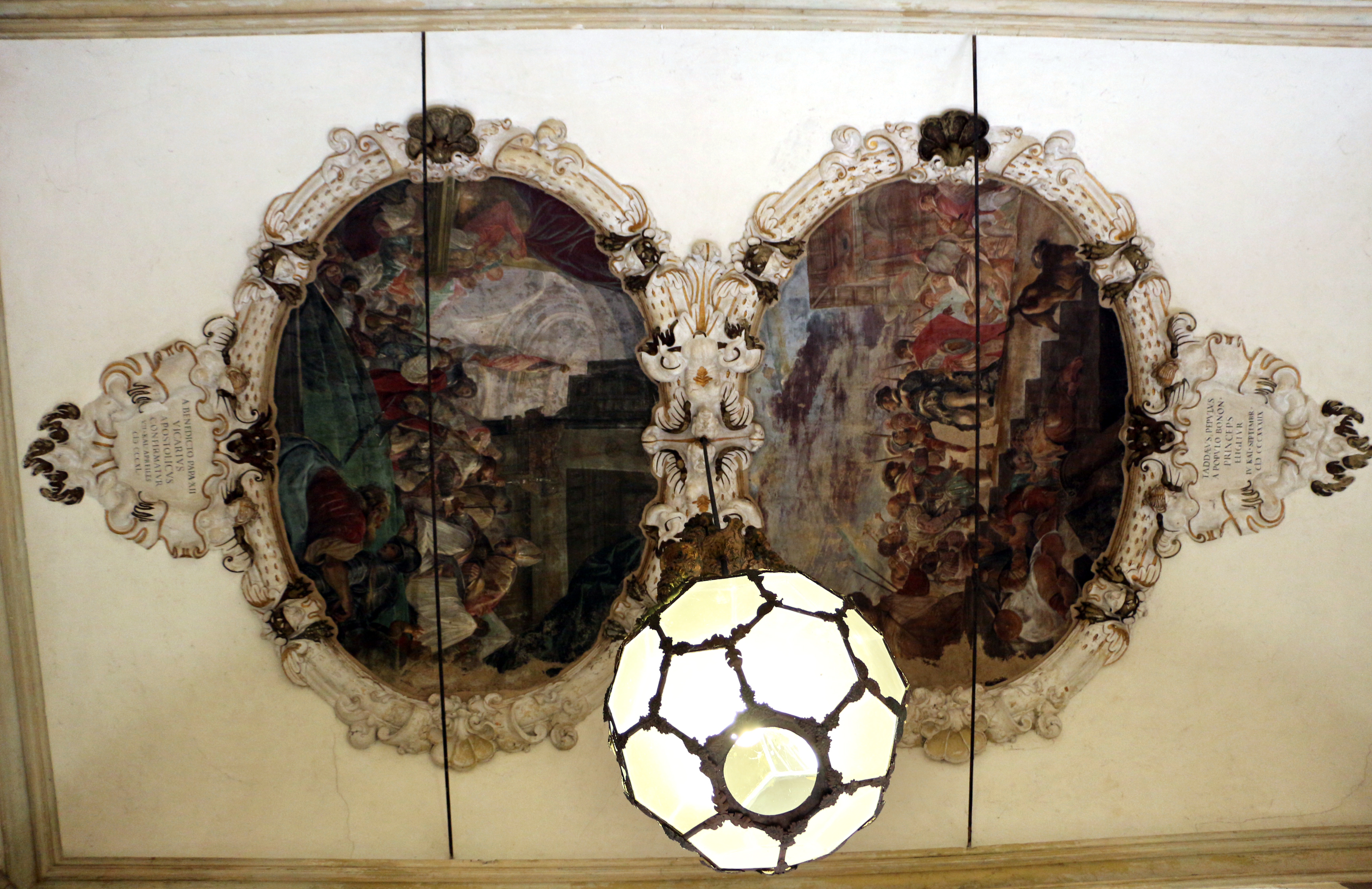
Oval ceiling frescoes by Canuti in Palazzo Pepoli Campogrande

Their seat in the city was Palazzo Pepoli Vecchio, constructed by Taddeo Pepoli. The Pepoli maintained dynastic alliances through well-considered marriages: Obizzo III d'Este, Marquis of Ferrara, married Jacopa Pepoli in 1317 and the condottiero Roberto Alidosi, papal vicar and lord of Imola, was given Giacoma Pepoli. The commune of Castiglione dei Pepoli in the Italian Province of Bologna still bears the family's name.

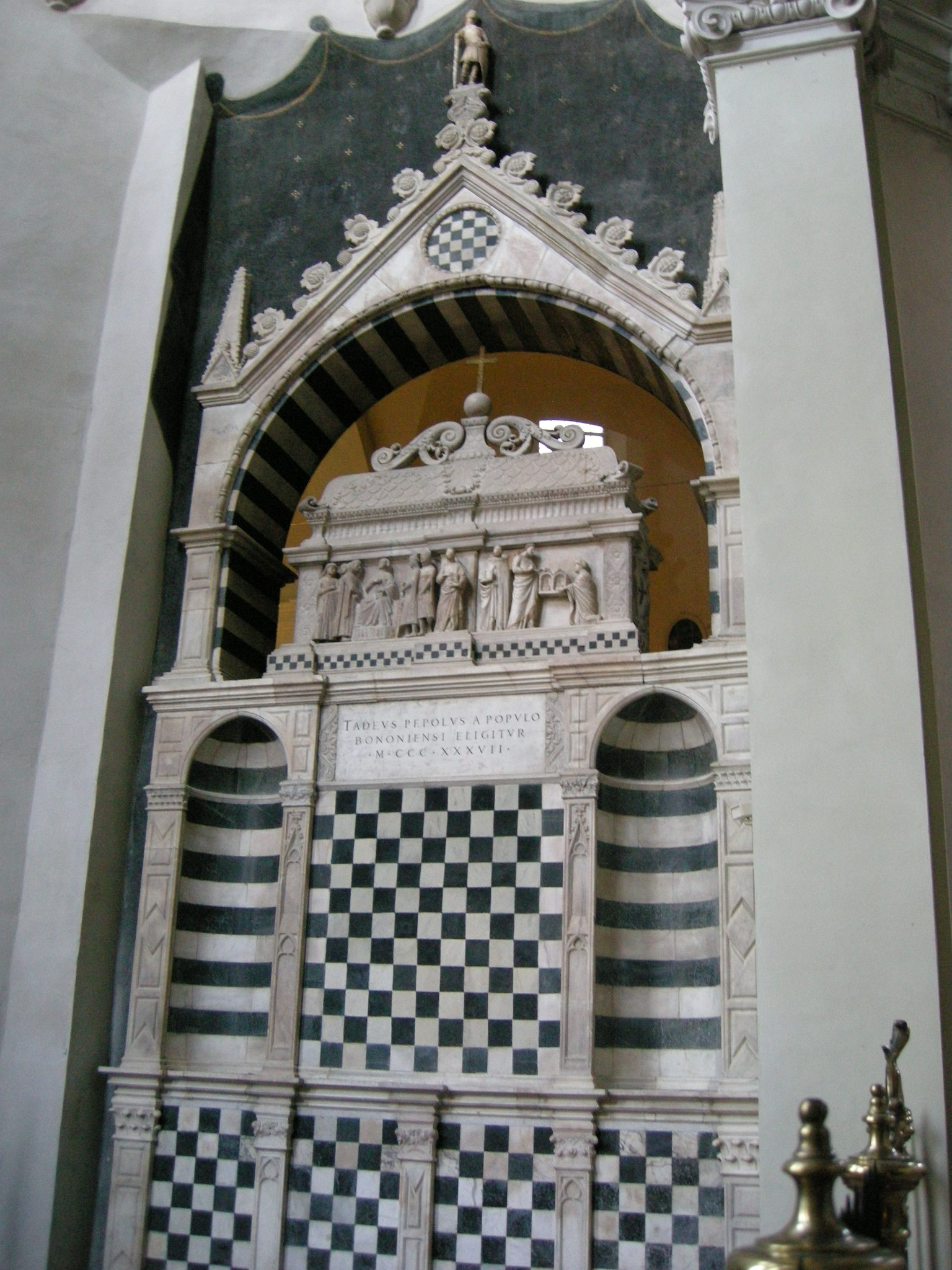
Monument to Taddeo Pepoli, Basilica of San Domenico, Bologna, 1347

=== 15th and 16th Centuries ===
After the rule of Taddeo Pepoli (1337-1347), Bologna fell to the Visconti of Milan. While Cardinal Gil de Albornoz forcibly returned the city to the papal orbit in 1360, the Pepoli never regained their former civic power. The family remained prominent landowners. Guido Pepoli was ordained cardinal by Pope Sixtus V in 1589. The imposing Palazzo Pepoli Campogrande was commissioned in 1653 by the newly minted Senator Odoardo Pepoli; the architects were Giovanni Battista Alberoni and Giuseppe Antonio Torri. Today it houses the Baroque works once in the Pinacoteca Nazionale di Bologna.

A later member of the family, conte Carlo Pepoli, wrote Vincenzo Bellini's libretto for I Puritani and provided the lyrics for Rossini's song "La Danza". To him Giacomo Leopardi dedicated one of his canti.

=== House of Bonaparte ===
Napoleone Gioacchino Pepoli was a senator of the Kingdom of Italy, Mayor of Bologna, and Italian envoy to Russia. Moreover, he was also a grand-nephew of Napoleon Bonaparte through his mother, Princess Louisa Julie Caroline Murat the daughter of Prince Joachim Murat - Napoleon's brother-in-law.
