= Fontanelice =

- Comune
- Comune di Fontanelice
- Location within Italy Location within Emilia-Romagna
- Coordinates: 44°16′N 11°34′E
- Country: Italy
- Region: Emilia-Romagna
- Metropolitan city: Bologna (BO)

Area
  - Total: 36.6 km^{2} (14.1 sq mi)
- Elevation: 165 m (541 ft)

Population (Dec. 2014)
  - Total: 1,984
  - Density: 54.2/km^{2} (140/sq mi)
- Time zone: UTC+1 (CET)
  - Summer (DST): UTC+2 (CEST)
- Postal code: 40025
- Dialing code: 0542

Fontanelice (Romagnol: Funtâna) is a comune (municipality) in the Province of Bologna in the Italian region Emilia-Romagna, located about 30 kilometres (19 mi) southeast of Bologna. As of 31 December 2004, it had a population of 1,884 and an area of 36.6 square kilometres (14.1 mi^{2}).

Fontanelice borders the following municipalities: Borgo Tossignano, Casalfiumanese, Casola Valsenio, Castel del Rio. A reinforced concrete bridge over the Santerno River connects Fontanelice to the village of Casalfiumanese.

== Demographic evolution ==
Historical population

Year	Pop.	±%
1861	1,807	—
1871	2,080	+15.1%
1881	2,264	+8.8%
1901	2,752	+21.6%
1911	3,015	+9.6%

Year	Pop.	±%
1921	3,113	+3.3%
1931	3,077	−1.2%
1936	3,169	+3.0%
1951	2,875	−9.3%
1961	2,245	−21.9%

Year	Pop.	±%
1971	1,616	−28.0%
1981	1,560	−3.5%
1991	1,621	+3.9%
2001	1,797	+10.9%

Source: Data from ISTAT

== Notable residents ==
- Architect Giuseppe Mengoni was born in Fontanelice.
