= San Martino di Pedriolo, Casalfiumanese =

Church in Bologna province, Italy

Coordinates: 44°21′16.4″N 11°34′21.6″E

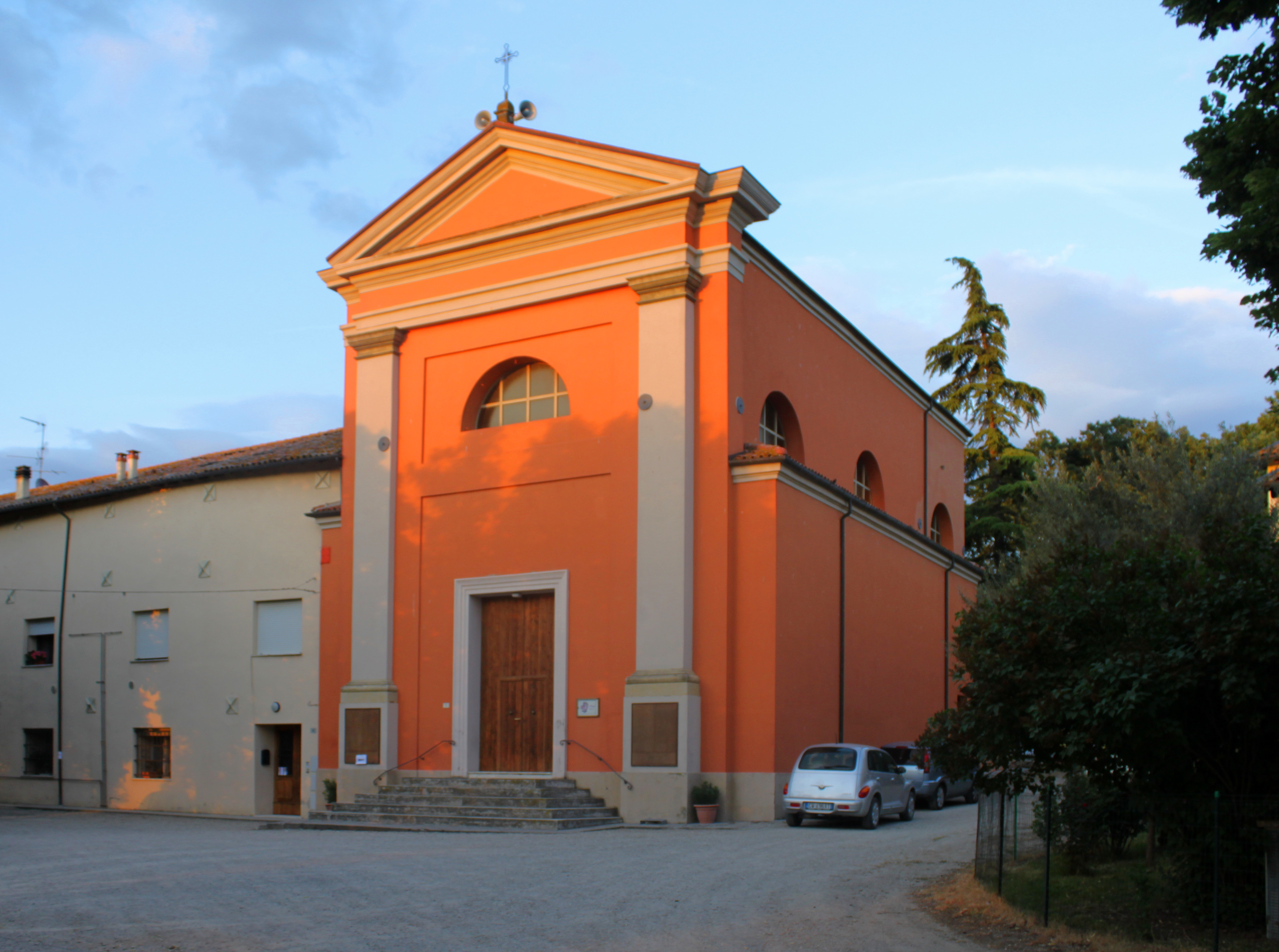
Chiesa di San Martino in Pedriolo - panoramio.jpg

San Martino di Pedriolo is a Roman Catholic parish church located in Casalfiumanese in the Province of Bologna, Italy. The neighborhood also shares the same name.

Originally present by the 13th century, the church was rebuilt in 1819 by the architect Angelo Venturoli. The belltower dates to the late 19th century. The main altar was designed by Gioachino Rodoloni, and once hosted an altarpiece depicting the Bishop San Martino resuscitating the son of a widow by Tadolini. Other works in the church included a Virgin healing the Sick by Crescimbeni, a pupil of Lazzaro Calvi; and a 19th-century St Joseph by Filippo Pedrini.

The church is nearby the Castello di Fiagnano, Casalfiumanese.
