= Roberto Alidosi =

Roberto Alidosi (died 29 November 1362) was a lord of Imola in the 14th century.

He was appointed as Papal vicar in the city in December 1350, and in 1356 he was captain of the Papal army. Roberto Alidosi married Michelina Malatesta, daughter of Malatesta III Malatesta, lord of Pesaro; after her death he married again with Giacoma Pepoli, of the ruling family of Bologna.

He died in 1362 at Imola, and was succeeded by his son Azzo. His other son Bertrando was also later lord of Imola.

Preceded by Lippo II Alidosi	Lord of Imola; 1350–1362	Succeeded by Azzo Alidosi
