= Riolo Terme =

- Comune
- Comune di Riolo Terme
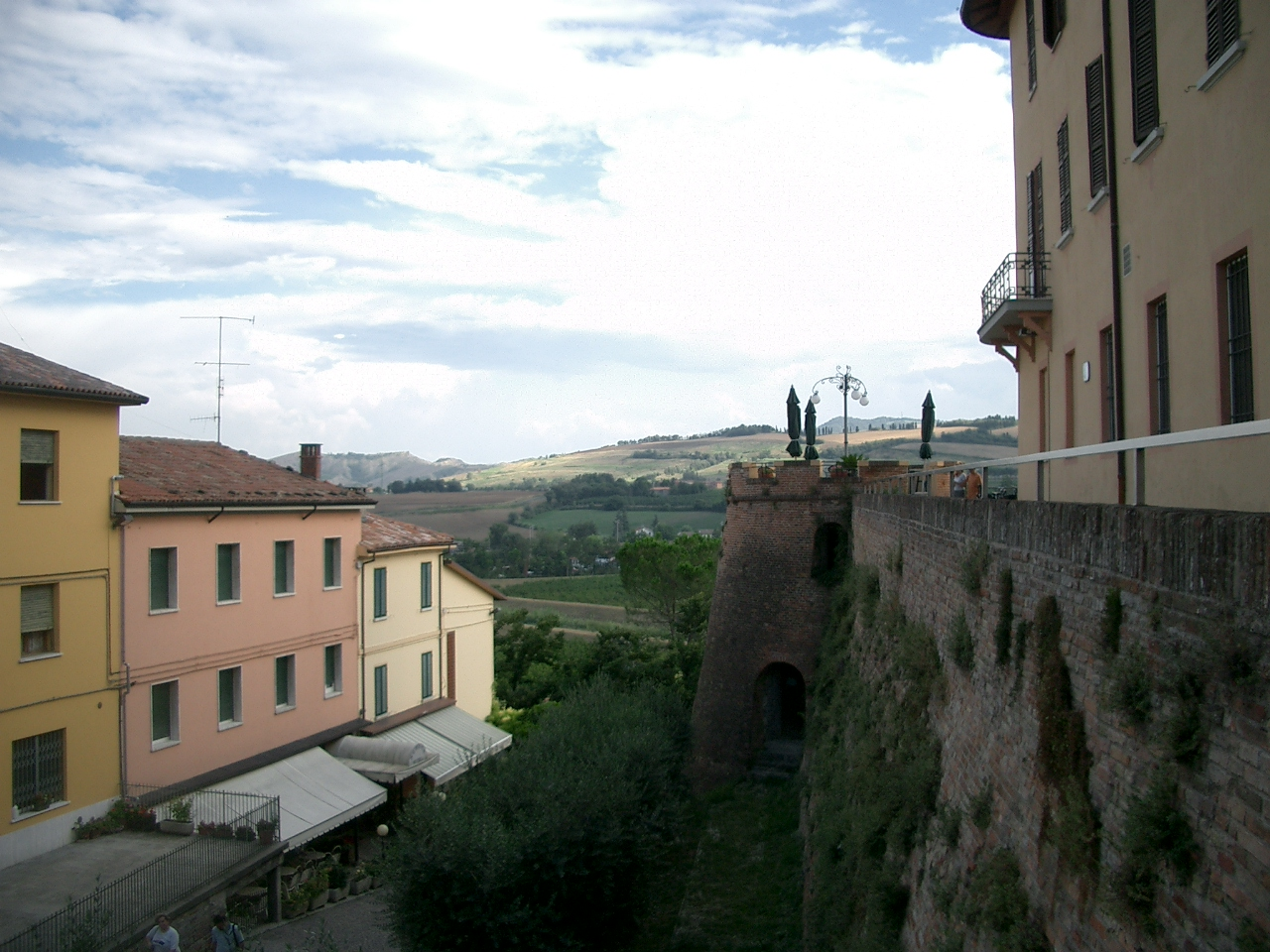

- Coat of arms

- Riolo Terme within the Province of Ravenna

- Location within Italy Location within Emilia-Romagna
- Coordinates: 44°17′N 11°44′E
- Country: Italy
- Region: Emilia-Romagna
- Province: Ravenna (RA)
- Frazioni: Borgo Rivola, Cuffiano, Isola, Mazzolano, Torranello

Area
  - Total: 44.5 km^{2} (17.2 sq mi)
- Elevation: 98 m (322 ft)

Population (Dec. 2011)
  - Total: 5,777
  - Density: 130/km^{2} (336/sq mi)
- Demonym: Riolesi
- Time zone: UTC+1 (CET)
  - Summer (DST): UTC+2 (CEST)
- Postal code: 48025
- Dialing code: 0546
- Patron saint: St. John the Baptist
- Saint day: First Monday in May
- Website: Official website

Riolo Terme (Romagnol: Riô or Riôl) is a comune (municipality) in the Province of Ravenna in the Italian region Emilia-Romagna, located about 40 kilometres (25 mi) southeast of Bologna and about 40 kilometres (25 mi) southwest of Ravenna. The main attraction of the town are the termal baths.

== History ==
Until 1957, the town was known as Riolo dei Bagni (Riolo of the Baths).

== Geography ==
Riolo Terme borders the following municipalities: Borgo Tossignano, Brisighella, Casola Valsenio, Castel Bolognese, Faenza and Imola. It counts 5 hamlets (frazioni): Borgo Rivola, Cuffiano, Isola, Mazzolano and Torranello.

== Twin towns ==
Riolo Terme is twinned with:

- Oberasbach, Germany
