= Firenzuola =

- Comune
- Comune di Firenzuola
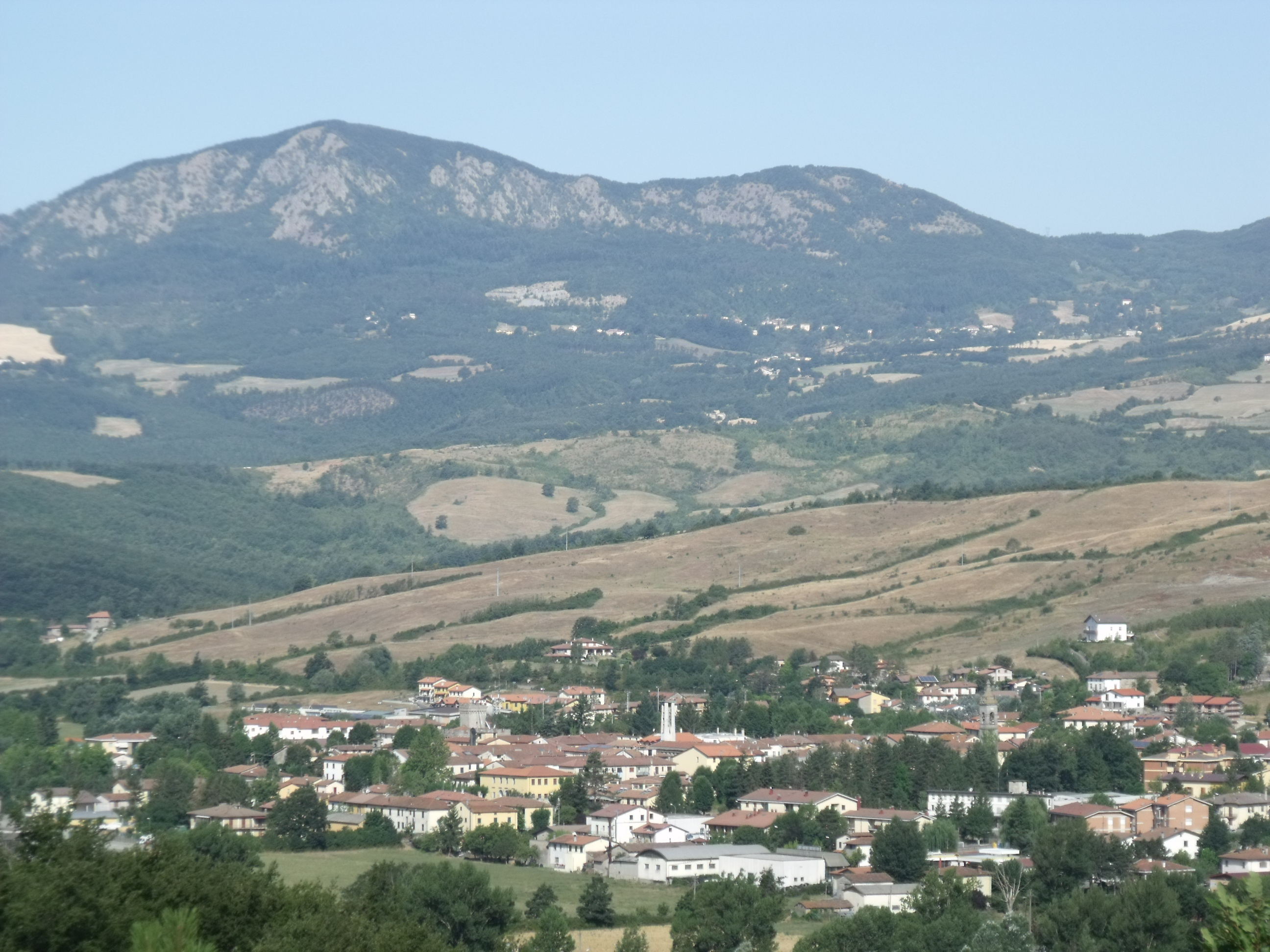
- Firenzuola in 2012

- Coat of arms

- Location within Italy Location within Tuscany
- Coordinates: 44°7′N 11°23′E
- Country: Italy
- Region: Tuscany
- Metropolitan city: Florence (FI)
- Frazioni: Borgo Santerno, Bruscoli, Casanuova, Castelvecchio, Castro San Martino, Coniale, Cornacchiaia, Covigliaio, Giugnola, Le Valli, Montalbano, Piancaldoli, Pietramala, Rifredo, S. Jacopo a Castro, San Pellegrino, Sigliola, Valle Diaterna, Visignano

Government
  - Mayor: Claudio Scarpelli

Area
  - Total: 271.99 km^{2} (105.02 sq mi)
- Elevation: 422 m (1,385 ft)

Population (31 August 2017)
  - Total: 4,635
  - Density: 17.04/km^{2} (44.14/sq mi)
- Demonym: Firenzuolini
- Time zone: UTC+1 (CET)
  - Summer (DST): UTC+2 (CEST)
- Postal code: 50033
- Dialing code: 055
- Patron saint: St. John the Baptist
- Saint day: June 24
- Website: Official website

Firenzuola is a comune (municipality) in the Metropolitan City of Florence, in the Italian region Tuscany, located about 40 kilometres (25 mi) northeast of Florence.

Firenzuola borders the following municipalities: Barberino di Mugello, Borgo San Lorenzo, Castel del Rio, Castiglione dei Pepoli, Monghidoro, Monterenzio, Palazzuolo sul Senio, San Benedetto Val di Sambro, Scarperia.

The medieval jurist Giovanni d'Andrea was born in the frazione of Rifredo around 1270.

== History ==
Firenzuola is one of the largest communes of the so-called "Tuscan Romagna". Its territory includes the mountain valley of the Santerno river, beyond the Apennines.

The town attracted the attention of local powers like Florence due to its strategic location guarding the road that connected Florence to Bologna, in a territory until then in the hands of the Ubaldini family, hostile to the Florentine Republic. Giovanni Villani gave Firenzuola its name, which means "small Florence" and to propose as its symbol a half lily (symbol of the Commune of Florence) and a half cross (symbol of the people). Its city plan, drawn by the engineers of the Republic, who planned it around the year 1350 (the first stone was set in 1332), seems similar to the "new lands" of the late 13th century, beginning of the 14th century in the Upper Valdarno area, with walls and a mighty Fortress endowed with a tower (1371). Another characteristic of this small late-medieval "ideal town" is the presence of porticos that involve all the principal parts of the town center.

U.S. Army Tank dozer clearing rubble in Firenzuola, September 1944

During World War II the mountains in the area were crossed by the Gothic Line, the defensive line set by the German troops to face the advance of the Allied armies. On September 17, 1944, after long and bloody clashes, the Allies broke down the Gothic Line, with the conquest of the Altuzzo Mountain, next to the Giogo pass. Firenzuola had already been completely destroyed by the bombardments of the Allies on September 12, 1944. In memory of the dead soldiers and warning for the future generations there are two cemeteries: the "Germanic Cemetery" (at the Futa pass), planned by the architect Oesterlen, that guards over 31,000 soldiers of the Wehrmacht, and the "Santerno Valley War Cemetery", near the village called Coniale, that contains about 300 corpses of Allies of various origin.

The reconstruction of Firenzuola immediately started as soon the war was over. Ninety-eight percent of the inhabited area had been destroyed, so that the Prefecture of Florence declared Firenzuola the most damaged town in the province. With the reconstruction, the modern style won against the possibility to reconstruct buildings with the recovery of materials among the ruins; nevertheless the road alignments, and the original porticos were respected. Also the main church of the town, the "Propositura di St. Giovanni Battista", completely destroyed in the bombardment, was rebuilt in modern style, both in the lines and in the materials, by the project of two protagonists of the architectural outline of the Postwar period, Carlo Scarpa and Edoardo Detti; it was inaugurated in 1966.

== Main sights ==
- Romanesque church of St. John the Baptist (10th-12th centuries). On the external right wall is a triangular decoration, a chessboard-shaped marble intarsia made of green serpentine from Prato and white marble.
- Medieval fortress, begun in 1371 by the Republic of Florence and finished in 1410. Currently it houses the town hall, while the lower floor it is the seat of the Museum of "Pietra Serena" (the typical stone of the region).
- SS. Annunziata's church
- Abbey of San Pietro a Moscheta, founded in 1034 by Giovanni Gualberto. It hosts the Museum of the historical Landscape of the Appennino, the regional mountain.
- Parish Church of St. John the Baptist at Camaggiore (13th century)
- Historical-Ethnographic Museum
- Remains of the Via Flaminia near the Futa pass

== See also ==
- Giugnola, a frazione administratively divided with Castel del Rio, in Emilia-Romagna
