= Luigi Alidosi =

Luigi Alidosi (also Ludovico, died 1430) was the lord of Imola (as Papal vicar) from 1391 until 1424, the last ruler of the city from his family. He was the son of Bertrando Alidosi and Elisa Tarlati.

According to some sources in 1401, his sister Ringarda (Rengarda) who had married the condottiero Andrea Malatesta was suspected of adultery with a nobleman of the Cesenan court named Amerigo Cassini (or Alberigo Casino)and her husband had her locked up in a tower at Bertinoro before sending her back to her family in Imola. Then Luigi and another brother had their sister poisoned as an honor killing in order to preserve the family honor.

Alidosi helped his son-in-law Giorgio Ordelaffi take control over Forli, and after Ordelaffis death Alidosi's daughter Lucrezia unofficially ruled Forli on the behalf of her young son. She also sent her son Tebaldo to his maternal grandfather Luigi for safety. In 1423 Milanese ambassadors intimidated Alidosi that Filippo Maria Visconti, the Lord of Milan was sending an army to take control of Forli – but that it would be better if Alidosi simply persuaded his daughter to cede Forli into the control of Visconti.

During the Wars in Lombardy, his city was attacked by Filippo Maria Visconti's army, and he was taken captive to Milan. When he was freed after the end of the conflict, Imola had been acquired by the Papal States: he therefore became a Cistercian monk, and died in Rome in 1430.

== Marriage ==
He married firstly Verde Pio di Savoia and secondly to Taddea Fieschi with the following issue.

=== Issue ===
- Lucrezia Alidosi, married Giorgio Ordelaffi.
- Bertrando Alidosi
- Taddea Alidosi

Preceded by Bertrando Alidosi	Lord of Imola; 1391–1424	Succeeded by To the Duchy of Milan
