= Palazzo Pepoli Vecchio =

Coordinates: 44.4926°N 11.3467°E

Palazzo Pepoli Vecchio (Museo della Storia di Bologna)
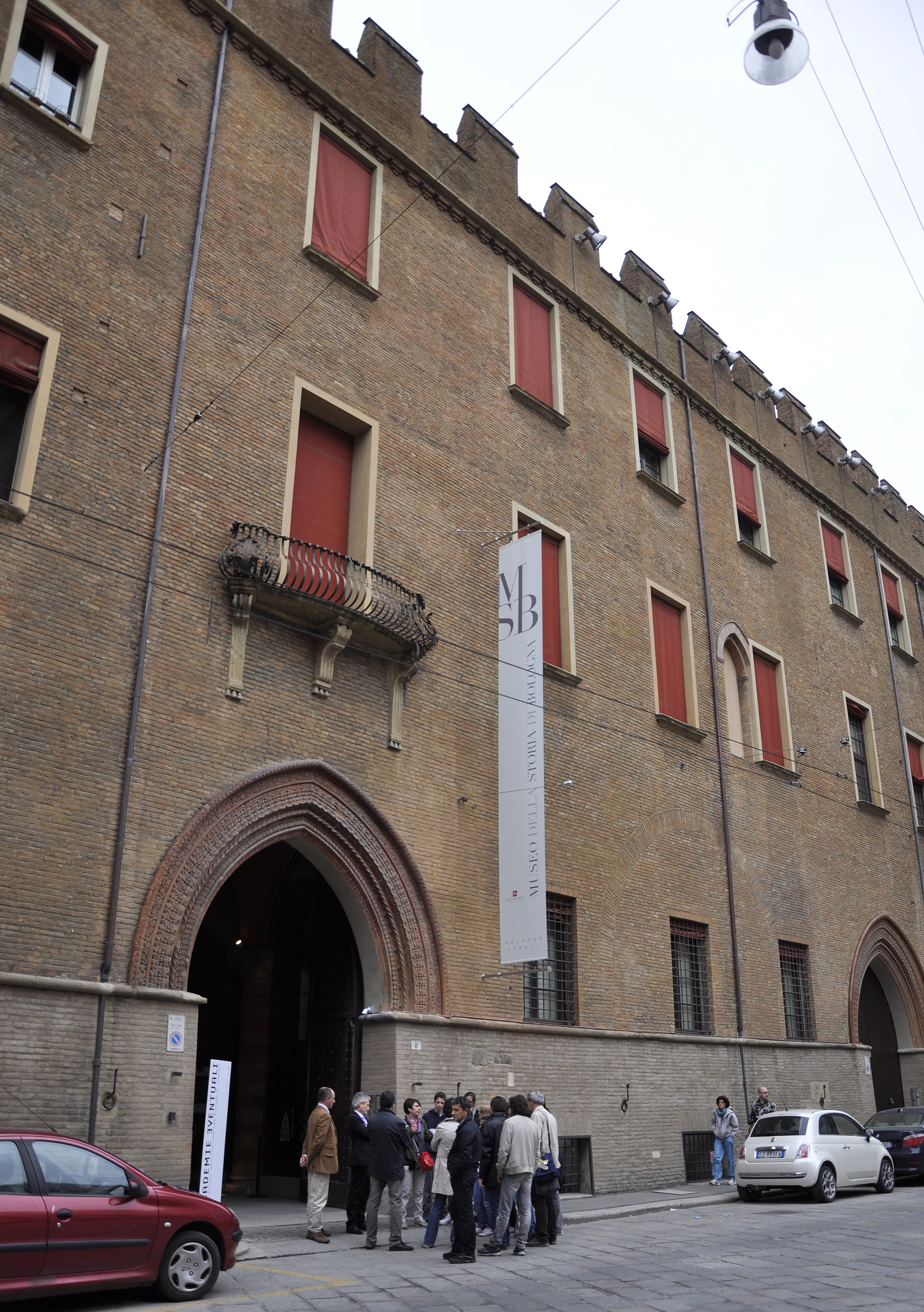
- Interactive map of the Palazzo Pepoli Vecchio (Museo della Storia di Bologna) area

General information
- Location: Bologna, Italy, Bologna
- Construction started: 1344

The Palazzo Pepoli Vecchio is a medieval palace located on Via Castiglione number 8, in central Bologna, region of Emilia-Romagna, Italy. The merlonated brick Gothic-style building is now the civic Museum of the History of Bologna. It stands across the street from the Baroque-style Palazzo Pepoli Campogrande, now a civic art gallery.

== History ==
The land for the palace was acquired in 1276 under the aristocrat Romeo Pepoli. In 1344, Taddeo Pepoli, son of Romeo, commissioned the building of the palace. The Pepoli family owned the palace until 1910. After the death of Agostino Siero Pepoli, the palace was ceded to the municipality.

In 2004, the Fondazione Carisbo acquired the palace and led to the establishment of the present museum of the History of Bologna (Museo della Storia di Bologna). Restoration occurred under architect Mario Bellini.
