= Casalfiumanese =

- Comune
- Comune di Casalfiumanese
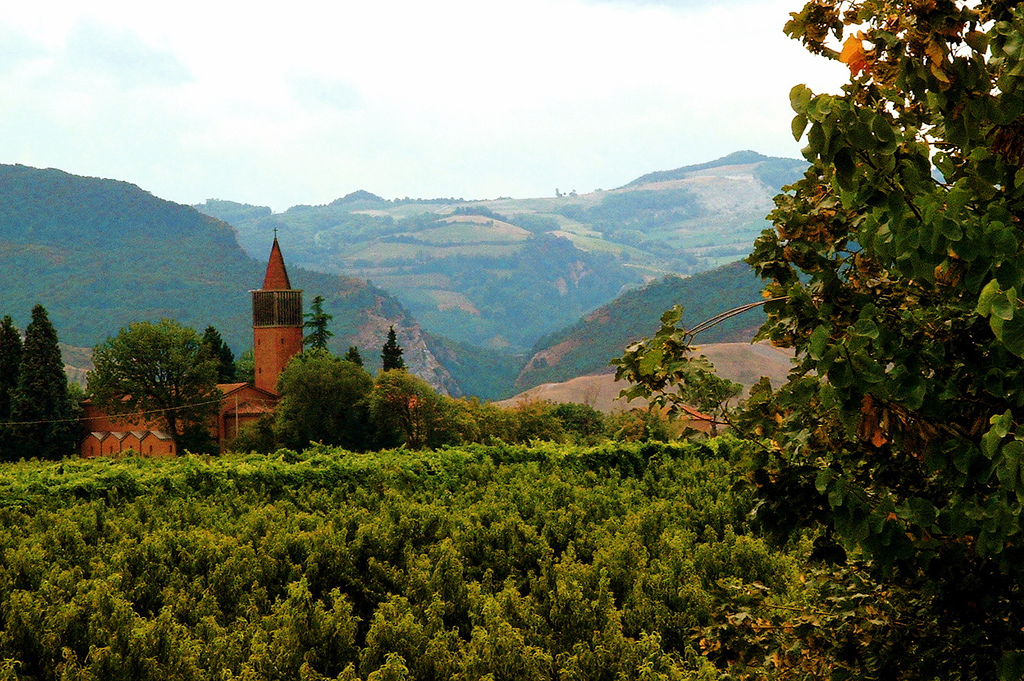

- Coat of arms

- Location within Italy Location within Emilia-Romagna
- Coordinates: 44°18′N 11°38′E
- Country: Italy
- Region: Emilia-Romagna
- Metropolitan city: Bologna (BO)
- Frazioni: Borgo Casale, Carseggio, San Martino in Pedriolo, Sassoleone

Government
  - Mayor: Beatrice Poli

Area
  - Total: 82.03 km^{2} (31.67 sq mi)
- Elevation: 125 m (410 ft)

Population (31 May 2017)
  - Total: 3,441
  - Density: 41.95/km^{2} (108.6/sq mi)
- Demonym: Casalesi
- Time zone: UTC+1 (CET)
  - Summer (DST): UTC+2 (CEST)
- Postal code: 40020
- Dialing code: 0542
- Website: www.casalfiumanese.provincia.bologna.it

Casalfiumanese (Romagnol: Casêl Fiumanés) is a comune (municipality) in the Metropolitan City of Bologna in the Italian region Emilia-Romagna, located about 30 kilometres (19 mi) southeast of Bologna.

Casalfiumanese borders the following municipalities: Borgo Tossignano, Castel del Rio, Castel San Pietro Terme, Dozza, Fontanelice, Imola, Monterenzio. A reinforced concrete bridge over the Santerno River connects Casalfiumanese to Fontanelice.

Near the end of World War Two, during the Spring Offensive in Italy, Casalfiumanese was liberated by American troops and Italian soldiers of the 184th Infantry Division "Nembo" on 12 April 1945.

== Sights ==
- San Martino di Pedriolo, Casalfiumanese

== People ==
- Luca Ghini
- Pope Honorius II

== Twin towns ==
- Rotondella, Italy
