= Lippo I Alidosi =

Lippo I Alidosi was the de facto lord of Imola, northern Italy, in 1278–1288, as captain of the people and Defensor Pupuli Imole et Capitaneus Civitatis Imole.

He was made prisoner by the Papal Inquisitor of Romagna, together with his nephew Lippo II. In 1317 he plotted to reconquer Imola, but died soon later.

Preceded by To the Papal States	Lord of Imola; 1278-1288	Succeeded by To the Papal States
