= Francesco Alidosi =

Italian cardinal and condottiero

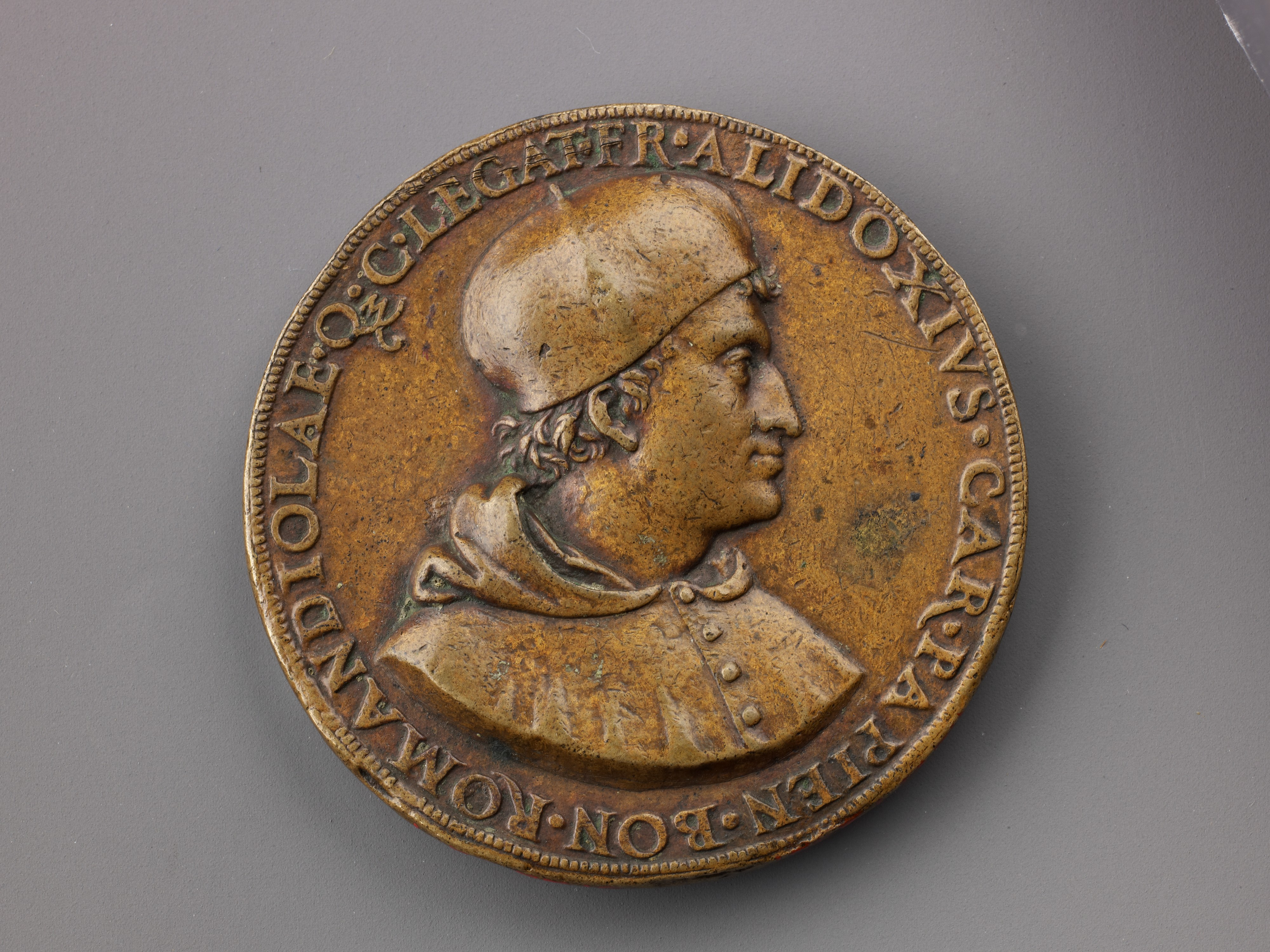
Portrait medal of Cardinal Francesco degli Alidosi

Francesco Alidosi (1455 – 24 May 1511) was an Italian cardinal, diplomat and condottiero, remembered as a friend and favourite of Pope Julius II, used by Michelangelo to smooth his relations with his difficult patron. He accompanied Giuliano della Rovere to France in 1494, and continued in favour when Della Rovere was elected pope, becoming Pope Julius II. Alidosi was elected as bishop of Mileto in 1504, and then transferred to the see of Pavia on 26 March 1505. He occupied the seat until his murder in 1511.

== Early life ==
Born at Castel del Rio, he was the third son of Giovanni Alidosi, lord of Castel del Rio. He went to France with Cardinal Giuliano della Rovere, the future Pope Julius II, in 1494. When Della Rovere was elected pope in 1503, Alidosi became his secretary and main collaborator, and was appointed papal chamberlain, then treasurer.

== Cardinal-priest ==
Portrait by Raphael

Though many cardinals opposed the promotion, in 1505, Alidosi was created cardinal-priest of Santi Nereo e Achilleo, opting for the title of S. Cecilia on 11 August 1506. He served as an intermediary between Michelangelo Buonarroti and Pope Julius II and, in 1506, signed on behalf of the pope the contract for the Sistine Chapel ceiling frescoe, later doing the same for the proposed statue of the Pope in Bologna. He also served as Cardinal protector of England within the college. He was a protector of Erasmus and patron of the arts.

Julius II placed great confidence in him, finding him to be an energetic and shrewd collaborator in his political plans. On 22 September 1508, the cardinal went to Viterbo to visit the Pope, who gave the legation in Bologna to Cardinal Ippolito d'Este of Ferrara. The following November, the pope recalled Cardinal Alidosi from the legation.

After taking possession of the legation in Bologna on 27 June 1508, he ordered Alberto Castelli, Innocenzo Ringhieri, Sallustio Guidotti and Bartolomeo Magnani to be strangled. They were accused of "having supported a conspiracy to favor the Bentivoglio", and for having worked with the Venetians against the pope. More than thirty other persons, supporters of the Bentivoglio, were also executed. These actions unleashed a great indignation among the Bolognese.

Named legate in Romagna and Marche in early 1509, he took possession of Ravenna on 29 May 1509 and left his brother Obizzo as governor. He was sent as an envoy to the king of France and arrived on 19 June 1509, together with Cardinal François Guillaume de Castelnau-Clermont-Ludève at Mantua. The king of France Louis XII nominated him as bishop of Cremona without papal approval. On 4 January 1510, the cardinal was recalled to Rome in order to answer to Pope Julius II about the complaints of the Bolognese.

Some theorize the pope recalled Cardinal Alidosi in order to make use of his experience to negotiate peace with Venice. An agreement was reached on 24 February 1510. After that, the Pope was forced to take a more accommodating attitude towards King Louis XII, Holy Roman Emperor Maximilian I and Alfonso I d'Este, Duke of Ferrara to ensure the independence of the Catholic Church and the freedom of Italy from foreigners.

== Accusation of treason ==
In April 1510, many Bolognese notables were shocked to learn the pope returned the legation of Bologna to Cardinal Alidosi. They suspected him of dealing with the French during the fight against Venice. On 7 October 1510, while at the papal field near Modena, Francesco Maria I della Rovere, Duke of Urbino, had the cardinal captured, handcuffed and led back to Bologna escorted by 150 horsemen. Outside the San Felice gate, twelve balestrieri removed the handcuffs and led him to a public square. Here he was accused of high treason.

The Duke of Urbino and citizens of Bologna were hoping he would be punished. Instead, the pope allowed him to defend himself, and, finding the accusations unjustified, ruled in his favour. Cardinal Alidosi was named apostolic administrator of the see of Bologna on 18 October 1510, a post which he occupied until his death. On 28 October 1510, Cardinal Alidosi was again taken prisoner by the Duke of Urbino for treason. The pope soon had him freed again and reinstated his honours.

On 14 May 1511, the pope moved his residence from Bologna to Ravenna for security reasons, lodging in the Benedictine monastery of San Vitale. The supporters of the Bentivoglio and those who opposed the power of the church revolted immediately. At about 10 p.m. on 20 May, a disguised Cardinal Alidosi escaped to Castel del Rio, taking all of value that he could carry. This action prompted Francesco Maria della Rovere, at the gates of the city, to abandon the field, along with all the artillery, nearly all the provisions, and numerous flags. On 23 May Gian Giacomo Trivulzio, head of the French army, entered Bologna with the Bentivoglio.

The pope notified the cardinals of the loss of the city, and charged the duke of Urbino and the citizens with treason. He asked the duke to be executed, but Francesco Maria responded by charging Alidosi with treason. From Castel del Rio, the cardinal went to Ravenna to give his version. He was accompanied by his brother-in-law, Guido Vaini, and a legatine guard of 100 horsemen. Pope Julius II determined that the traitor had been the duke of Urbino.

== Death ==
On 24 May 1511, the duke had an audience with the Pope. He was reproached sourly and exited with eight of his faithful. He went to the lodgings of Cardinal Alidosi, who was staying with Cardinal Marco Vigerio della Rovere, near the church of San Vitale in Ravenna. At the same time, the cardinal, accompanied by his guard, was heading out for the apartments of the Pope, who had invited him to supper. The cardinal saluted the Duke, and a youngster in the Duke's retinue dismounted his horse angrily and advanced towards the cardinal. Taking the bridle of the mule that the cardinal was riding, he stabbed the cardinal in the side. The cardinal fell off the mule, and once on the ground, a captain cut the cardinal's cheek and one of his ears with a dagger, while Filippo Doria struck a mortal blow in his head.

Herbert Vaughan notes, "'A favourite has no friends,' -- particularly a favourite of the type of Alidosi -- so that many persons, including the Legate's own servants, looked on unconcernedly upon this murder of an unpopular Churchman in broad daylight."

The cardinal's remains were honoured by Pope Julius II with solemn exequies in the cathedral of Ravenna, where they were interred. When the cathedral was demolished in 1745, Gaspare Desiderio Martinetti, a physician, gave the cardinal's skull to the Benedictines of San Vitale, so that it would not get mixed with other bones. From them, it passed to the Classense Library and was exposed to the public. Later, the legate, Cardinal Agostino Rivarola, had it removed and reinterred. From a recognition made on 20 June 1968, the traces of cleaving that he received on the head could still be noticed. In the cathedral of Imola, there is a cenotaph surmounted by the effigy of the cardinal in a bas-relief, and under it, a marble plaque that remembers him and others of his family.

== Personality ==
Alidosi's many enemies criticized his supposed sexual activities. Cardinal Pietro Bembo described him as "a man of shameful and criminal life, in whom there was no integrity and no religion, to whom nothing was ever inviolate, nothing chaste, nothing holy."

== Portrayals in fiction ==
Francesco Alidosi is a character in the 2011 television series Borgia. He is portrayed by Matt Di Angelo and is depicted as the lover of Cardinal della Rovere. The rumor dates from his lifetime.
