= Lippo II Alidosi =

- Litto
- Died: 1350
- Occupation: ruler

Lippo II Alidosi (also called Litto; died 1350) was a ruler of Imola, a member of the Alidosi family.

He was elected "Captain of the People" of Imola in 1334, the same year in which he was podestà of Bologna. Two years later Benedict XII gave him the title of Papal vicar of Imola. He was the father of Roberto Alidosi.

== Notes ==
Preceded by To the Papal States	Lord of Imola; 1334–1350	Succeeded by Roberto Alidosi
