= Castel del Rio =

- Comune
- Comune di Castel del Rio
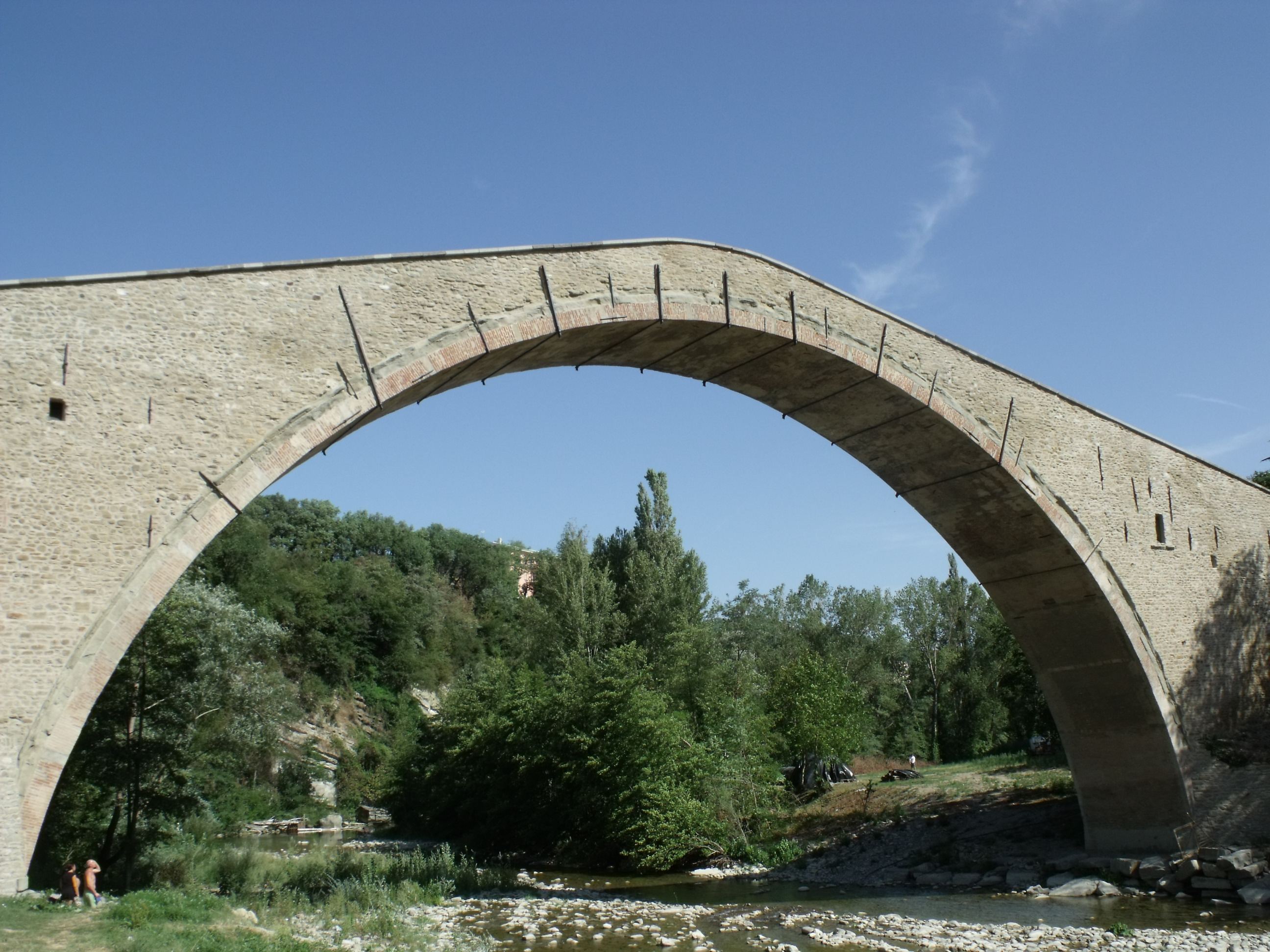
- Ponte Alidosi.

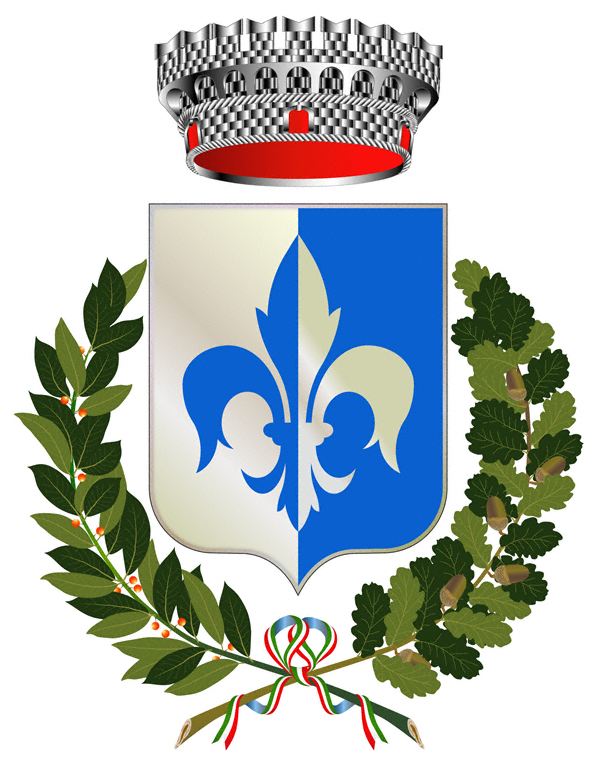
- Coat of arms

- Location within Italy Location within Emilia-Romagna
- Coordinates: 44°12′N 11°30′E
- Country: Italy
- Region: Emilia-Romagna
- Metropolitan city: Bologna (BO)
- Frazioni: Belvedere, Giugnola, Moraduccio, Valsalva

Government
  - Mayor: Alberto Baldazzi

Area
  - Total: 52.56 km^{2} (20.29 sq mi)
- Elevation: 215 m (705 ft)

Population (31 May 2017)
  - Total: 1,229
  - Density: 23.38/km^{2} (60.56/sq mi)
- Demonym: Alidosiani
- Time zone: UTC+1 (CET)
  - Summer (DST): UTC+2 (CEST)
- Postal code: 40022
- Dialing code: 0542
- Patron saint: St. Ambrose
- Website: Official website

Castel del Rio (Romagnol: Castel d'e' Rì) is a comune (municipality) in the Metropolitan City of Bologna in the Italian region Emilia-Romagna, located about 35 kilometres (22 mi) southwest of Bologna.

Historically, the town's countryside is a large producer of chestnut, which has received the European Protected Geographical Status.

== History ==
Traces of human presence in the area date to the 6th-5th centuries BC. The current town was however founded in the 5th-6th centuries AD as Massa di S. Ambrogio. Starting from the 10th century, there were fortifications and castles, whence the toponym Castrum Rivi from which the current name derives. In 1076 the castle was acquired by Matilde of Canossa; later Emperor Otto IV gave the fief to the Alidosi family, who held it for more than four centuries until it became part of the Papal States.

During World War II Castel del Rio was located across the Gothic Line. Numerous of its citizens fought as partisans against the German occupation.

== Main sights ==
- The Fortress Palace, commissioned in the early 16th century by Francesco Alidosi, cardinal and friend of Bramante, to whom some attribute the design. Notable is the Renaissance style court, with sandstone columns and shell-shaped fountains. The edifice now houses the Castel del Rio Town Hall, a library, the Museum of War and of the Gothic Line, and the Museum of the Chestnut Civilization.
- Ponte Alidosi, built by Obizzo Alidosi from 1499. This bridge is said to have inspired Leonardo da Vinci for a similar design over Golden Horn in Istanbul, which has not been built then, but a wooden version of it is now built as a pedestrian pass over a highway in Ås, Akershus in Norway.
- Ruins of the castles of Cantagallo, Valmaggiore and Castellaccio
- Medieval historical centers of Castel del Rio, Belvedere and Giugnola

== See also ==
- Giugnola, a frazione administratively divided with Firenzuola, in Tuscany
