= Castelli (surname) =

Castelli is an Italian surname. Notable people with the surname include:

- Annibale Castelli (c. 1570–c.1620), Italian painter, active near Bologna
- Bernardo Castelli (1557–1629), Italian painter of the late-Mannerist style, active mainly in Genoa and Liguria
- Francesco Castelli Borromini (1599–1667), Italian architect
- Giovanni Battista Castelli (1500 or 1509–1569 or 1579), Italian historical painter
- Matteo Castelli (c. 1555–1632), Swiss architect
- Teramo Castelli (1597–1659), Italian noble and Roman Catholic Theatine missionary
- Valerio Castelli (1624–1659), pre-eminent Ligurian painters
- Alfredo Castelli (born 1947), Italian comic book author
- Anna Castelli Ferrieri (1918–2006), Italian architect and industrial designer
- Bartolomeo Castelli (1650–1730), Roman Catholic Bishop of Mazara del Vallo
- Benedetto Castelli (1577–1643), Italian mathematician
- Bernardino Castelli (1750–1810), Italian painter of portraits and religious figures
- Bertrand Castelli (1929–2008), French producer, director, lighting designer, choreographer and painter
- Clino Castelli (born 1944), Italian industrial designer and artist
- Clément Castelli (1870–1959), French painter
- David Castelli (1836–1901), Italian scholar and educator in the field of secular Jewish studies
- Davide Castelli (born 1999), Italian footballer
- Enrico Castelli (1909–1983), Italian basketball player
- Facundo Castelli (born 1995), Argentine professional footballer
- Filomena Delli Castelli (1916–2010), Italian politician
- Gaetano Castelli (born 1938), Italian painter and set designer
- Giovanni Paolo Castelli (1659–1730), Italian painter, active in Rome
- Giuseppe Castelli (1907–1942), Italian athlete
- Giuseppe Castelli (footballer) (1919–?), Italian professional football player.
- Guido Castelli (born 1965), Italian lawyer and politician
- Henri Castelli, artistic name of Henri Lincoln Fernandes Nascimento (born 1978), Brazilian actor and model
- Ignaz Franz Castelli, (1780–1862), Austrian dramatist
- Irene Castelli (born 1983), Italian gymnast
- Jeffrey W. Castelli, CIA officer
- Juan José Castelli (1764–1812), Member of the first national government of Argentina
- Laura Castelli (born 1986), Italian politician
- Leo Castelli (1907–1999), American art dealer
- Luciano Castelli (born 1951), Swiss painter, graphic artist, photographer, sculptor and musician
- María Castelli (born 1972), Argentine former field hockey player
- Marissa Castelli (born 1990), American pair skater
- Michelangelo Castelli (1808–1875), Italian politician
- Nino Castelli (1898–1925), Italian rower
- Paolo Castelli (born 1980), Italian footballer
- Pietro Castelli (1574–1662), Italian physician and botanist
- Raimondo Castelli (died 1670), Roman Catholic Bishop of Narni
- Rato Castelli (1904–1984), Brazilian footballer
- Richard Castelli (born 1961), producer, artistic consultant
- Roberto Castelli (boxer) (born 1969), Italian boxer
- Roberto Castelli (born 1946), former Italian Minister of Justice
- Samuel Castelli (born 1985), Mexican singer
