= Il Risorgimento (newspaper) =

Italian-language newspaper

Il Risorgimento (English: "The Resurgence") was a liberal, nationalist newspaper founded in Turin, Italy, on 15 December 1847 by Camillo Benso, Count of Cavour and Cesare Balbo, who was a backbone of the "neo-Guelph" party that saw in future a rejuvenated Italy under a republican government with a papal presidency—ideas with which Cavour did not agree. The two men were soon joined by Pietro di Santa Rosa and Michelangelo Castelli, who soon assumed the position of vice-director. Publication began as a result of the relaxation of stringent press control which made the newspaper financially viable. Within weeks the paper, conceived as a weekly, was published daily, as revolutionary events, initiated by an insurgency in Palermo and demonstrations in Genoa, gained momentum. The paper was initiated to form a moderate middle-class "respectable" balance to the more radical "democratic" program of Concordia, which was initiated at the same time. The initial editorial by Cavour made the following claim: "Our aim not being of making money but of enlightening the country and of cooperating with the grand works of "Resurgence" initiated by the government."

Thus without seeming to lead, Cavour's Il Risorgimento offered a regimen of liberal political ideas, of constitutionalism and freedom from foreign control. From its inception, the paper advocated a constitution to be granted by Carlo Alberto of Savoy, the absolute monarch of Sardinia-Piedmont. The eventual constitution was the Statuto Albertino, which was decreed on 8 February 1848. Cavour's editorials were produced with the longer view of preparing Sardinia-Piedmont for a leading role in the coming upheavals, which came to the fore in the revolutionary events of 1848–49. As editor of the newspaper, Cavour gained a great degree of influence in Sardinian politics; in an editorial on 23 March he pressed for a war to drive the Austrians from Lombardy and Venice, where urban revolutions were under way. This proved disastrous for the kingdom with its overwhelming defeat at the Battle of Novara.

Although he withdrew as editor in October 1848, Il Risorgimento paved Cavour's way towards entering the government—he was appointed prime minister to Victor Emmanuel II in 1852, after Carlo Alberto's resignation—and a decade's career engineering Italian unification.

In May 1849, Il Risorgimento combined with the more conservative La Nazione, continuing to support government measures.

In the course of the unification of Italy, the term Risorgimento came to be applied to the process of unification itself.
