= Bergomi Palace =

Building in Mirandola, Italy

Coordinates: 44.88724°N 11.06581°E

Palazzo Bergomi
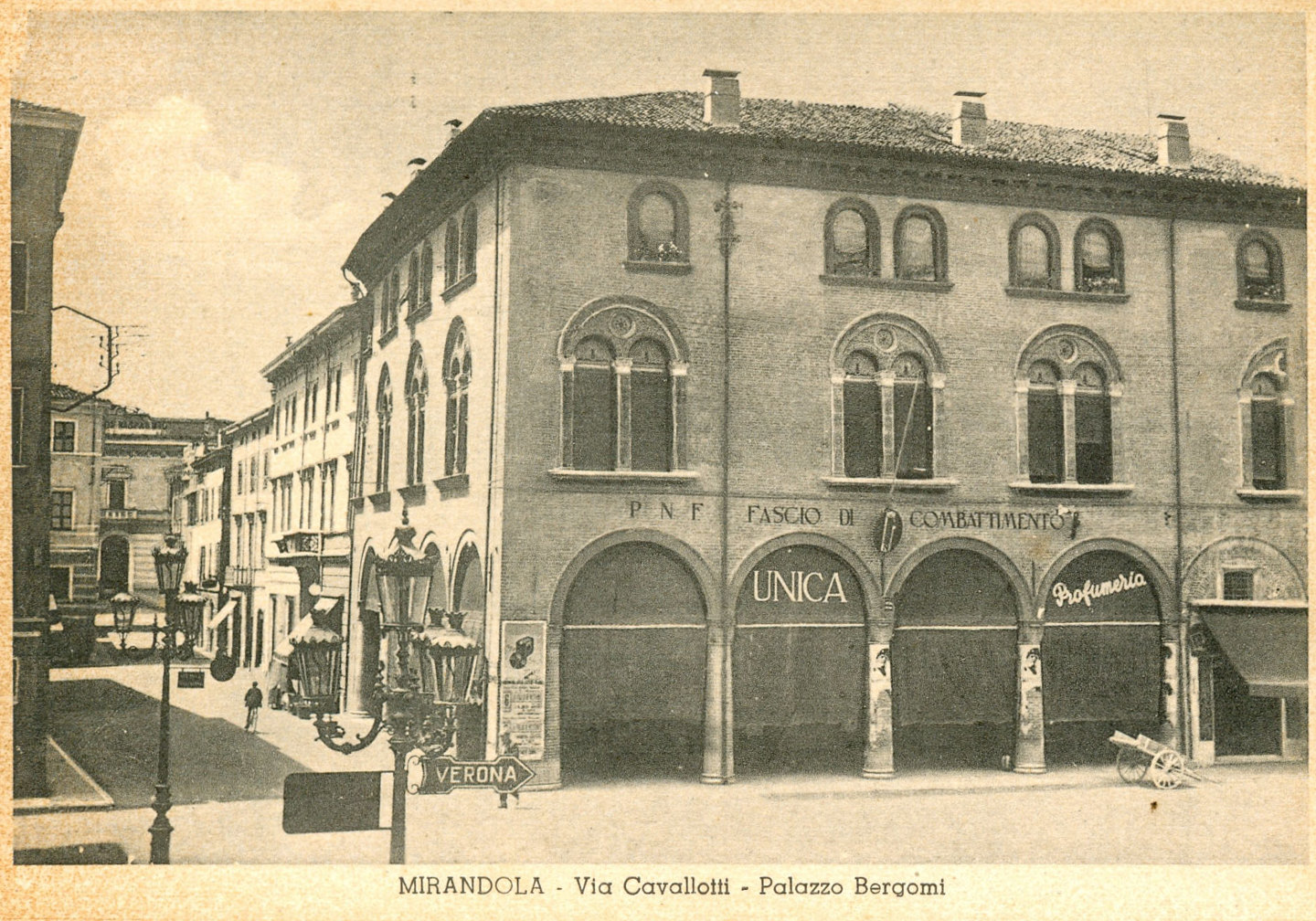
- Interactive map of the Palazzo Bergomi area

General information
- Architectural style: rinascimentale
- Location: Mirandola

The Bergomi Palace (in Italian: Palazzo Bèrgomi) is a 14th-century building in Mirandola, in the province of Modena, Italy.

The palace is situated in the south-western corner of Costituente square and it is characterized by a portico and terracotta decorations in Renaissance style, similar to the nearby Town hall: its architectural grandeur and elegance reflect the economic and political power of the ancient Bergomi family that owned the building, originally from the city of Bergamo.

The covered passage of the palace is commonly called "portico of Unica", remembering the old shop of confectionery (produced by the National Union Industries of Chocolate and Related) that was once located there.

== History ==
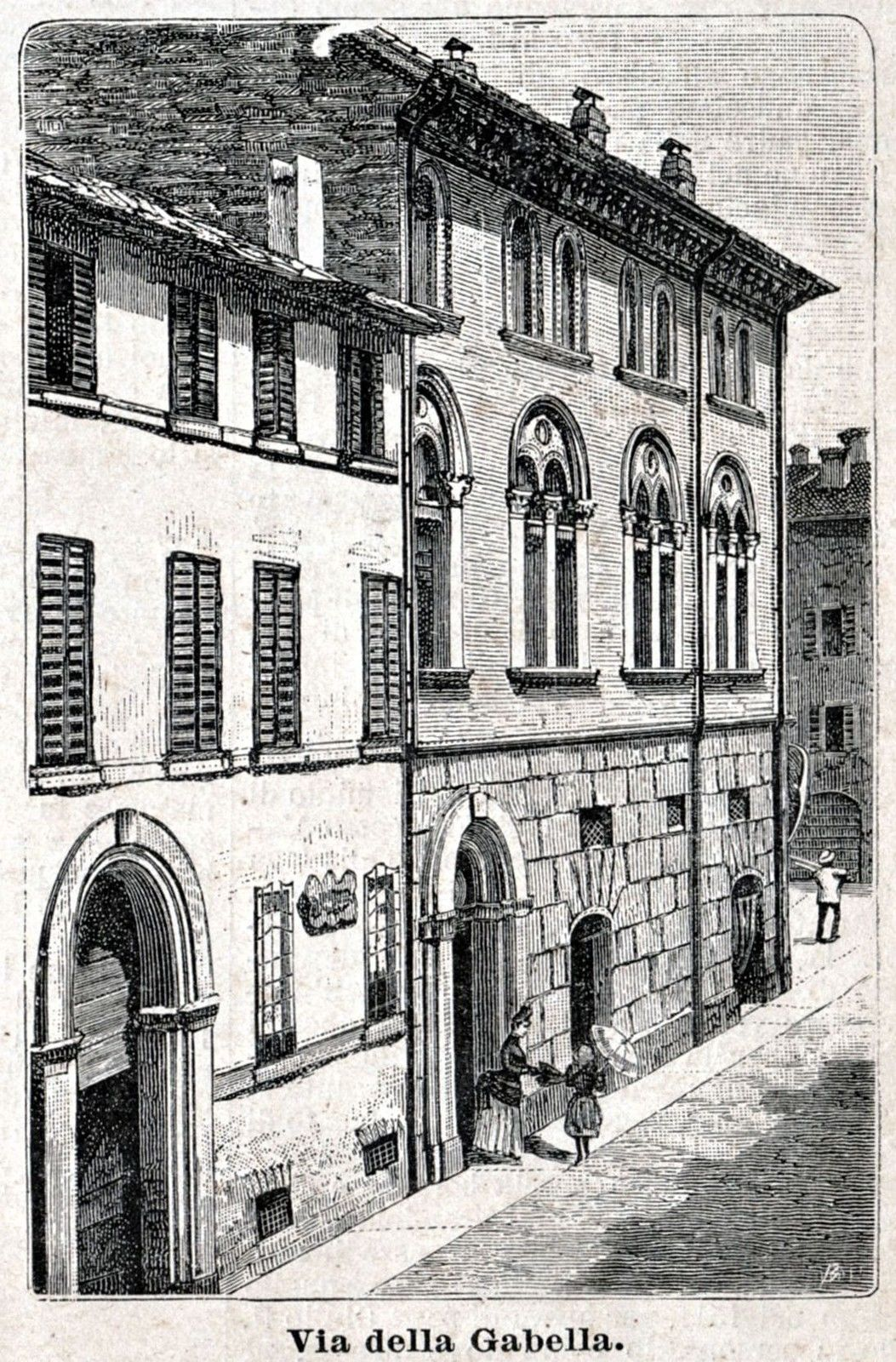
The old Gabella street (now Felice Cavallotti street)

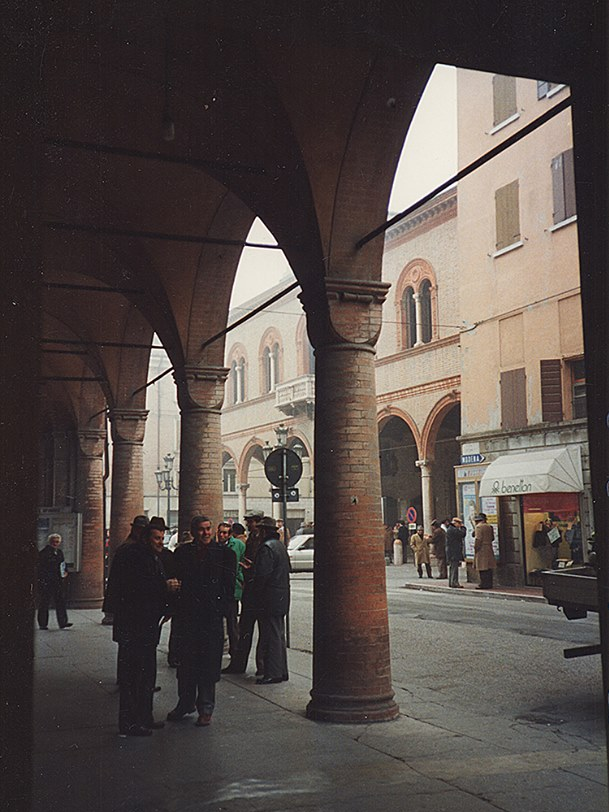
Mirandola municipal palace seen from the porch of Palazzo Bergomi (1989)

The origin of the palace, which once belonged to the Buffali family, is not known with certainty, but some documents kept in the archives of the Congregation of Charity of Modena, record the presence in the mid of 15th century of a rich family of notaries called Sàssoli de 'Bergami, that is, originating in the city of Bergamo, of which later they took and kept their surname (Bergami or Bergomi). The noble family was raised to the title of Counts by the House of Pico, and the most prominent members of the family were the medician-philosopher Cristoforo Bergomi, pupil of Antonio Cittadini from Faenza, and the literary canon Giuseppe Bergomi.

An anonymous chronicler described a firefight under the portico of the palace in 1518 between the Mirandola followers of Giovanni Francesco II Pico della Mirandola and the agreed followers of Galeotto II Pico:

They met under the portico of Bergami in Borgonovo and were at the hands together shouting one part: - Francesco, Francesco - and the other: - Galeotto, Galeotto - and began those of Concordia, hidden behind the columns, to shoot snapped with those of the Earth who little by little losing the field withdrew right to the fortress to wait for the day, having equipped the wall with people in the hope that in the new light would have their enmities in cages and in prison.

— Cronista anonimo (1874). Memorie storiche della citta e dell'antico ducato della Mirandola. p. 71.

The palace is then mentioned in a notary deed of 1 July 1611, in which Prince Alexander I Pico, eager to establish a cathedral in the city of Mirandola (which at the time still depended from the Parish Church of Quarantoli), undertook to pay the sum of 150 scudi per year to some members of the Society of Jesus, so that they would settle in the Collevati palace, that was to the Bergomi palace.

The portico of the palace remained open for a long time, given the successive undercurves made in ancient times to stabilize the building, but was later closed in an unspecified time to create spaces for shops.

In 1638 Alessandro Bergami, the last childless descendant of the family, ordered in his will that the ancient palace be transformed into his memory in the Alexandrian Convent, to be used as a monastery of the Capuchin nuns, but the palace was not considered suitable. After being rejected also by the Dominican friars, the palace became the seat of the Servite Fathers from 12 August 1675 until 1768.

In 1841 the new owner Giovanni Montanari had the facade of the palace restored, but the Ornamental Commission forced him to restore the old windowsills. A few years later, in 1865, the engineer Grazio Montanari covered the southern portico with a rusticated wall surmounted by a cordon, as well as redoing the cornice, the windows and the wall face.

After the unification of Italy, on 27 September 1863 the new Savings Bank of Mirandola was established by royal decree. It was officially opened on 1 January 1864 at the Bergomi palace, next to the town hall. The progressive expansion of business led to the transfer of the bank to the current Art Nouveau palace, built in 1911-1912 in Giacomo Matteotti square.

In 1922 the portico of the palace was reopened.

During the Fascist period it was the local seat of the National Fascist Party and of the Provincial Fascist Union of Farmers. fascista fu sede del Partito nazionale fascista e dell'Unione provinciale fascista degli agricoltori.

The palace was damaged by the 2012 Northern Italy earthquakes; the anti-seismic restoration and improvement works were completed in March 2016.

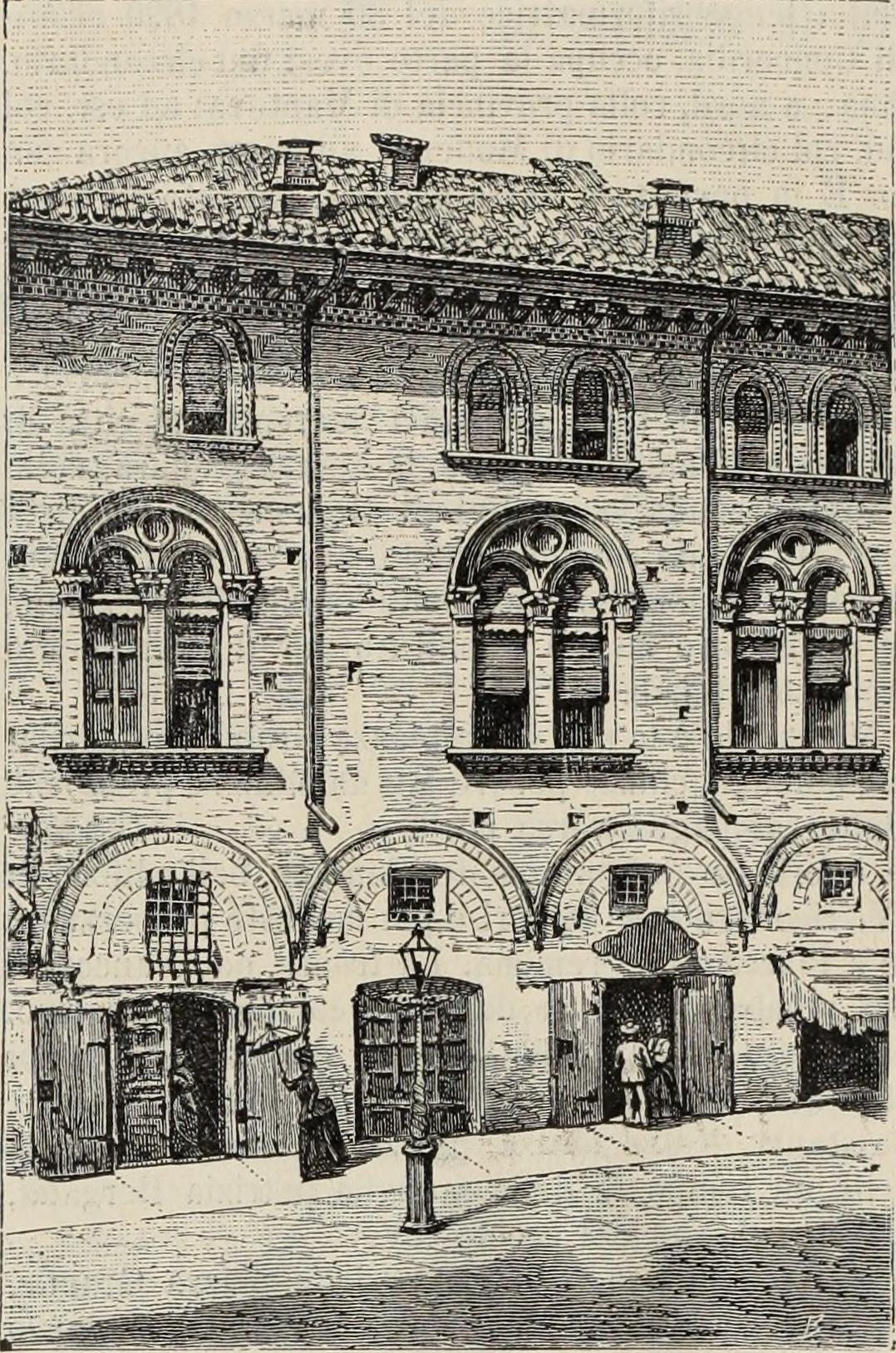
Palazzo Bergomi

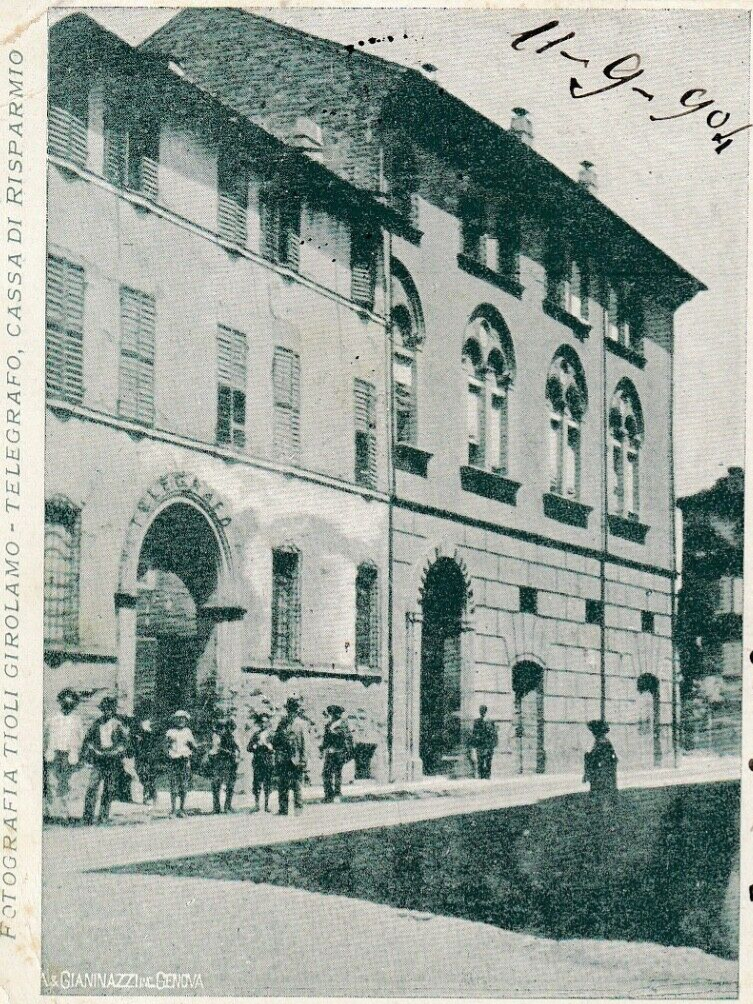
Telegrafo e Cassa di risparmio (1904)

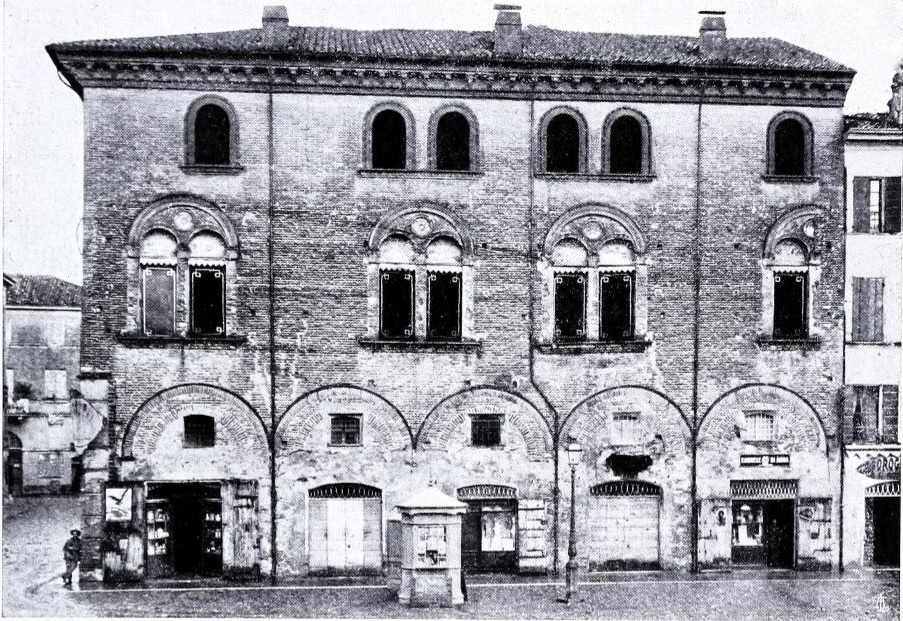
Palazzo Bergomi nel 1909

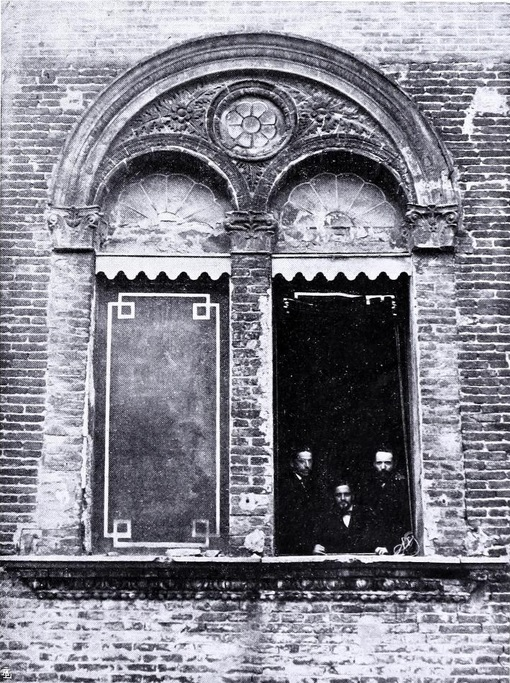
Finestra in primo piano (1909)

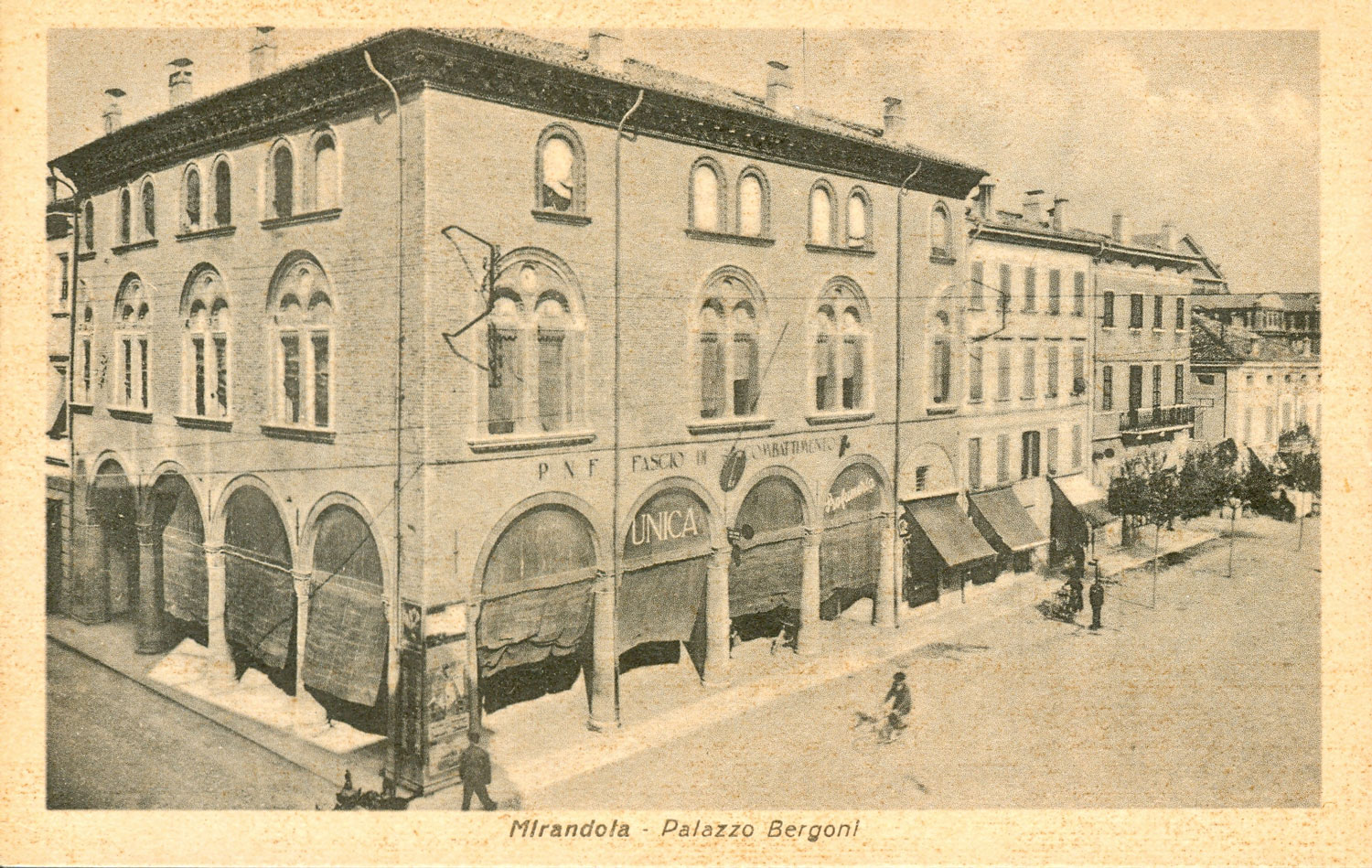
Palazzo in epoca fascista

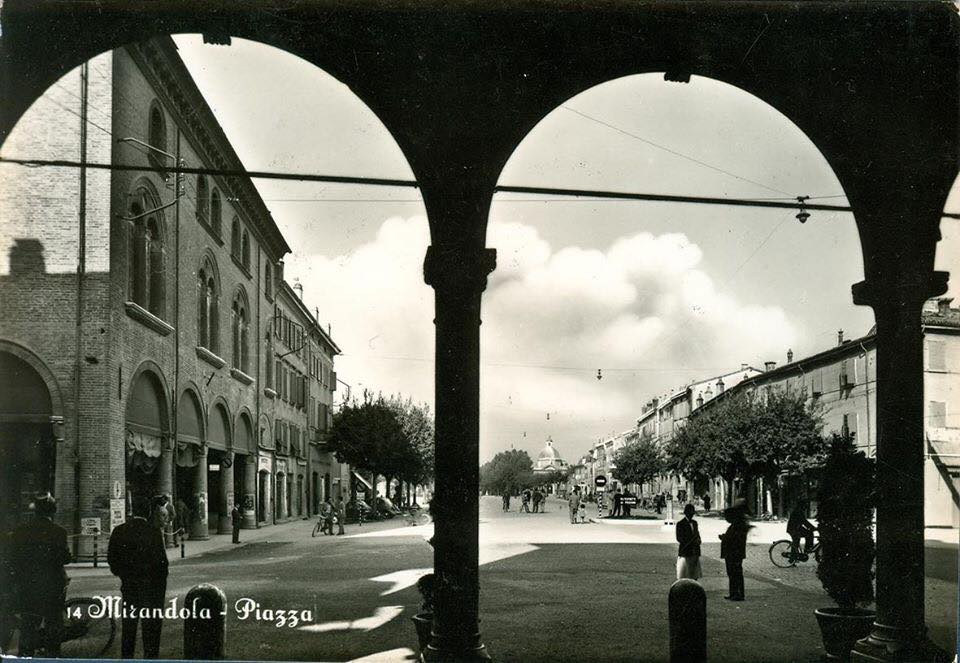
Piazza della Costituente

== Architecture ==
The palace is characterized by Renaissance forms inspired by Lombard and Ferrara architecture.

On the ground floor there is a high portico with nine round arches (five on the side of the square and four on the southern facade).

The two exposed brick facades of the main floor are each decorated with three and a half biforas and are decorated with terracotta tiles with Renaissance floral motifs due facciate in mattone a vista del piano nobile sono decorate ognuna da trei.

The top floor is characterized by 13 small monoforas, also decorated with terracotta ornaments.

== Bibliography ==
- Zucchini, Guido (1909). "Progetto di ristauro per l'antica Casa Bergami ora Cassa di Risparmio di Mirandola". XVIII (VIII). Milano: 70–72.

== See also ==
- Town hall of Mirandola
