= Giovanni Maria Tamburini =

Italian painter

Giovanni Maria Tamburini (flourished 17th century) was an Italian painter of the Baroque period.

== Biography ==
He was initially a pupil of Pietro Faccini, and then of Guido Reni in Bologna. He painted for several of the churches in Bologna. He painted a St. Antony of Padua for the Hospital of Santa Maria della Morte, and an Annunciation for the Sanctuary of Santa Maria della Vita.
