= Pietro Faccini =

Italian painter (1562–1602)

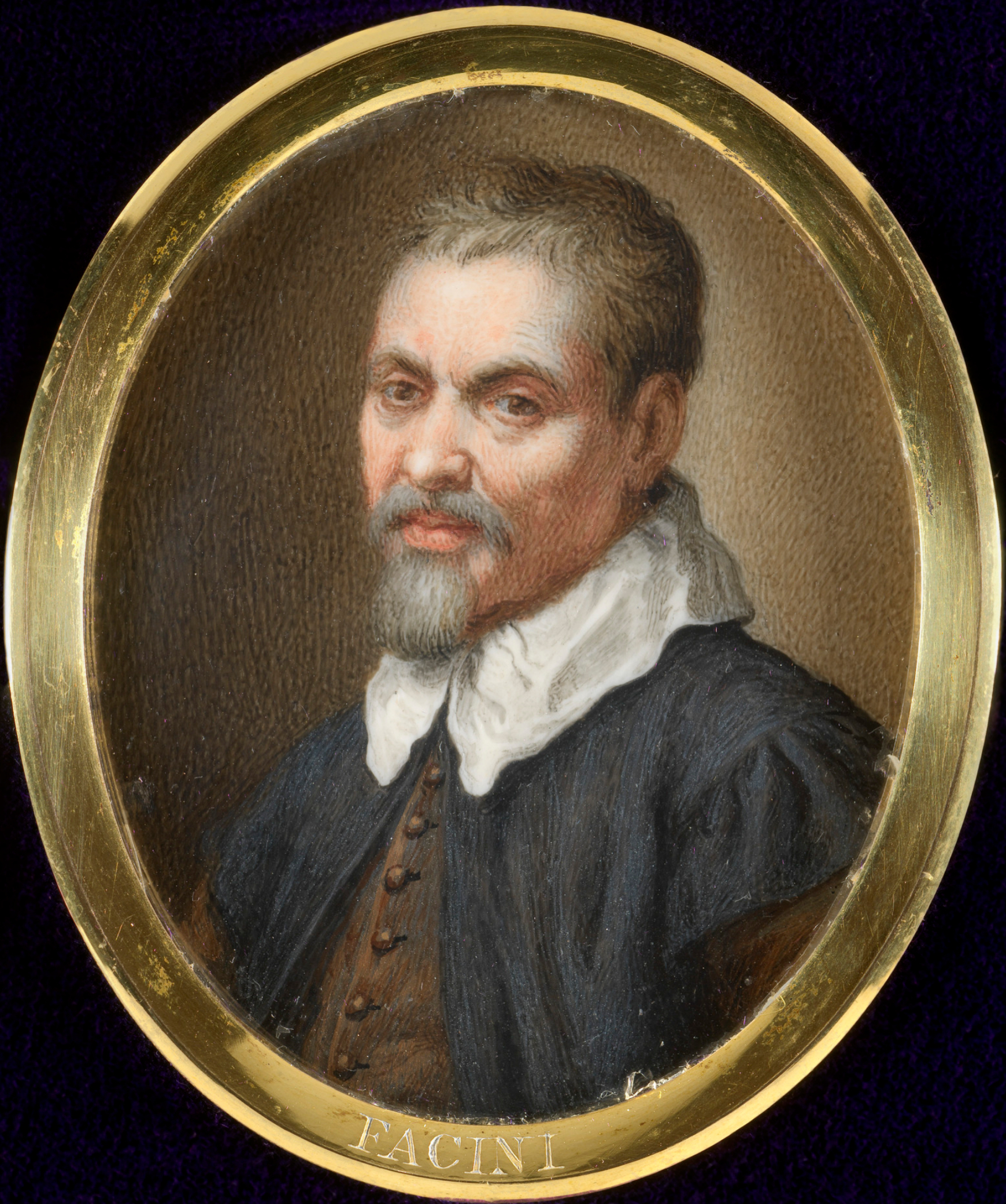
- Portrait of Pietro Faccini by Giuseppe Macpherson
- Born: 1562; Bologna, Papal States
- Died: 1 April 1602 (aged 39–40); Bologna, Papal States
- Occupations: Painter, printmaker
- Movement: Mannerism; Baroque

Pietro Faccini or Facini (1562 – 1 April 1602), was an Italian painter, draughtsman and printmaker. He was active near his birthplace of Bologna working in a style bridging Mannerism and the nascent Baroque.

== Life ==
Born in Bologna, he only started to study painting when he was already older. He was initially involved in commerce but apprenticed in the Carracci academy with Ludovico and Annibale Carracci commencing around 1583. In 1594, he left the Carracci academy and set up his own academy, possibly to develop his own style.

Annibale Castelli, Agostino Masucci, Domenico Maria Mirandola, and Giovanni Maria Tamburini were among his pupils.

== Works ==
=== Paintings ===
His documented painterly output consists of about a dozen works. His style departs from the linear "Roman" quality assumed by his mentors, and has a more sparkling quality, influenced by Tintoretto, Correggio, and Bassano. He was also inspired by the rich colour of Venetian painting and the exaggerated forms of Parmigianino. In 1590, he painted The Martyrdom of Saint Lawrence, now in the church of San Giovanni in Monte, Bologna. The warm, rich colour recalls the Carracci paintings in the Palazzi Fava and Magnani in Bologna, while the dense, thickly applied paint is reminiscent of Venetian painting. Faccini’s creation of a space teeming with bizarre humanity, with exaggerated facial expressions, however, shows a very personal taste already distanced from the academic idealizations of his early training.

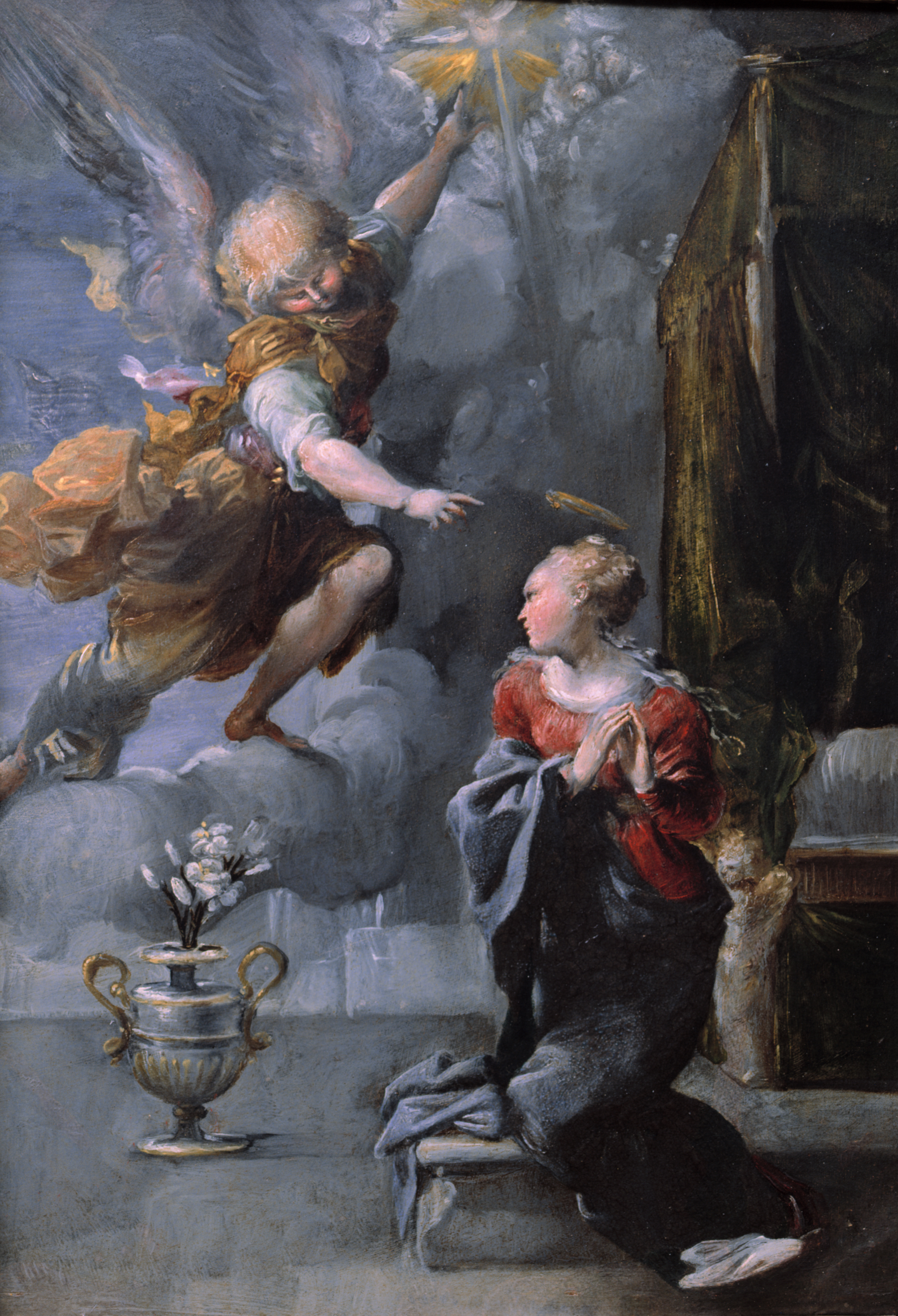
The Annunciation

Venetian influence is even more striking in the light-saturated colour, reminiscent of Titian, of the Martyrdom of Saint Stephen (Bologna, Budrio, Santa Maria del Borgo). The style of Parma, on the other hand, can be seen in the darting rhythms, suggestive of Parmigianino, of the Virgin of Loreto and Saints Bonaventura, Agatha, Lucy and Blaise (Mirandola, Palazzo Comunale), of the Rest on the Flight into Egypt (Guastalla, Palazzo Vescovile) and Christ and the Virgin Appearing to Saints Francis and Antoninus (San Domenico, Bologna), all painted after 1593.

Other Venetian elements, derived from Jacopo Tintoretto, occur in the patchy brushwork and the division of colours into warm and cold hues in the Annunciation (Pinacoteca Nazionale, Bologna), considered to be one of the artist’s finest works. Faccini’s knowledge of the work of Antonio da Correggio is evident in a series of paintings of c. 1600, characterized by a greater freedom of execution and softer, more fluid brushwork. Correggio’s influence is perceptible especially in the loose, expansive style of the Assumption of the Virgin (Bologna, Santa Maria dei Servi) and in the delicate use of paint in the Mystic Marriage of Saint Catherine (Rome, Pinacoteca Capitolina). The same influence can be seen in the beautiful painting of Saint Francis Receiving the Child from the Hands of the Virgin (Modena, priv. col.) and the small painting on copper of the Mystic Marriage of Saint Catherine (Bologna, Rac. Molinari–Pradelli).

Faccini’s last work is perhaps the Virgin with Saint Dominic (Bologna, Quarto Inferiore, Parrochiale): the colouring is dark and sober, but the greater luminosity and richer texture seem to presage the work of Domenico Fetti.

=== Prints and drawings ===
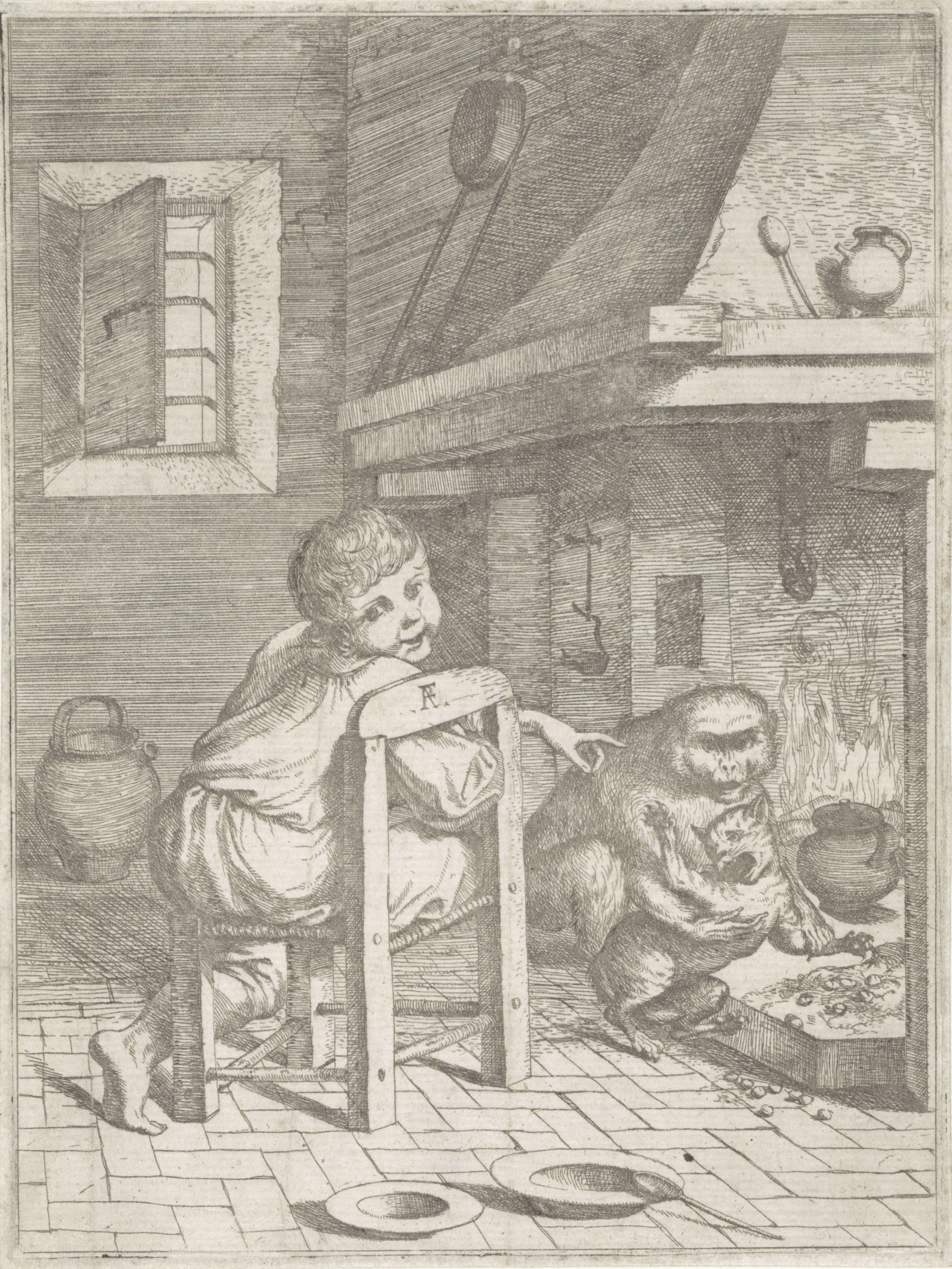
Boy by the fire with monkey and cat

It is likely that Faccini studied printmaking in the Carracci academy. He only left a few prints, among which is the Saint Francis Receiving the Christ Child in the Presence of the Virgin. The print is lightly etched using fine lines, which create an ethereal atmosphere, befitting Francis's heavenly vision. In his prints, Faccini developed the taste for the grotesque already noted in his paintings. Etchings such as the Blind Beggar and the Blind Man Guided by a Dog (both Bologna, Pinacoteca Nazionale), based on a drawing by Annibale Carracci, emphasize the most brutal and extravagant aspects of reality.

He was more prolific as a draughtsman working in a variety of media, including pen and ink, watercolour, and red chalk. His drawings were reportedly abundant, and there are examples in many major museums. Most are sketches from the nude, usually executed with rapid, restless strokes, in pen and watercolour with red chalk. Nine drawings (Florence, Uffizi) are all that remain from the rich collection owned by Leopoldo de' Medici.

== Gallery ==
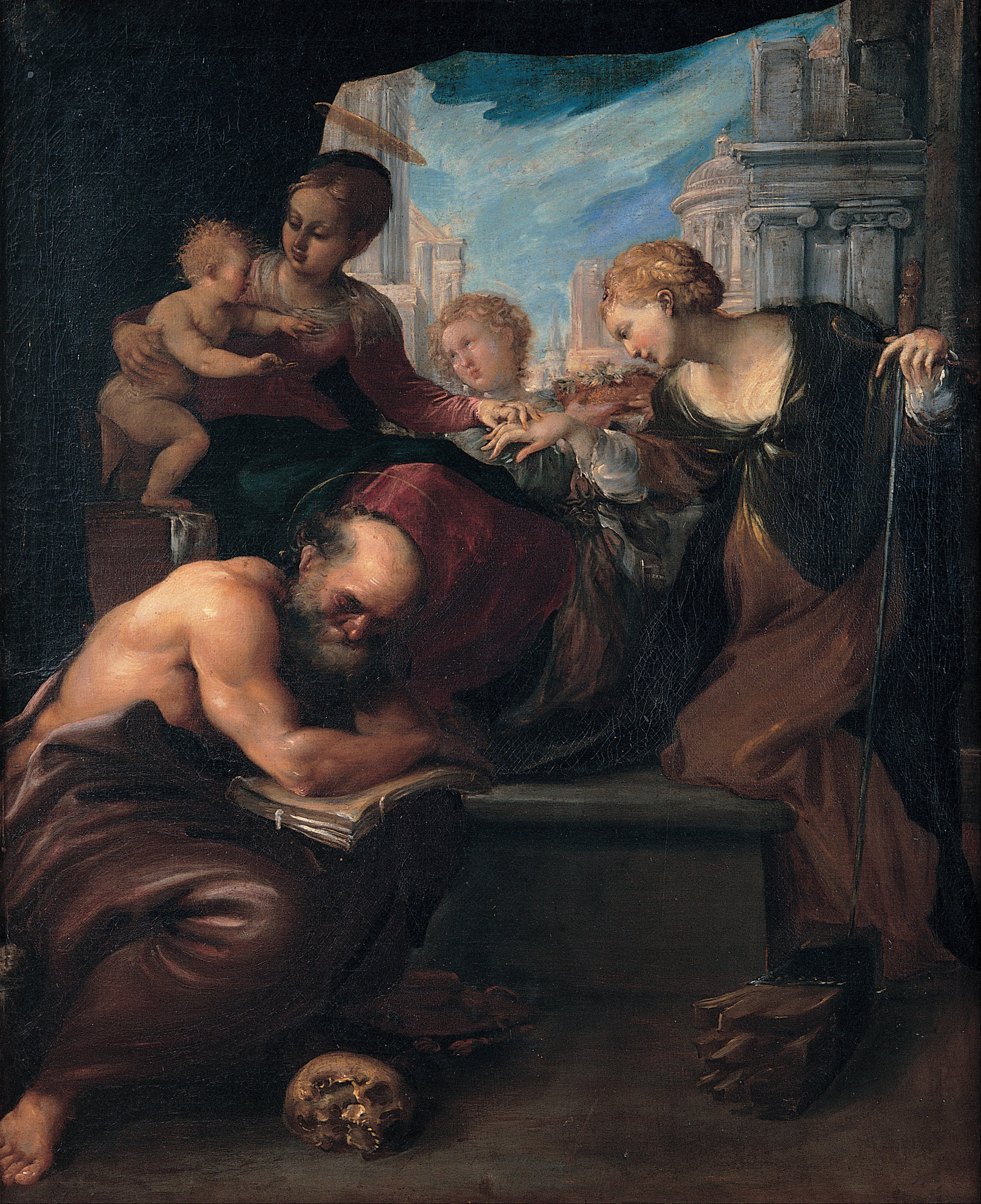
Mystic marriage of Saint Catherine

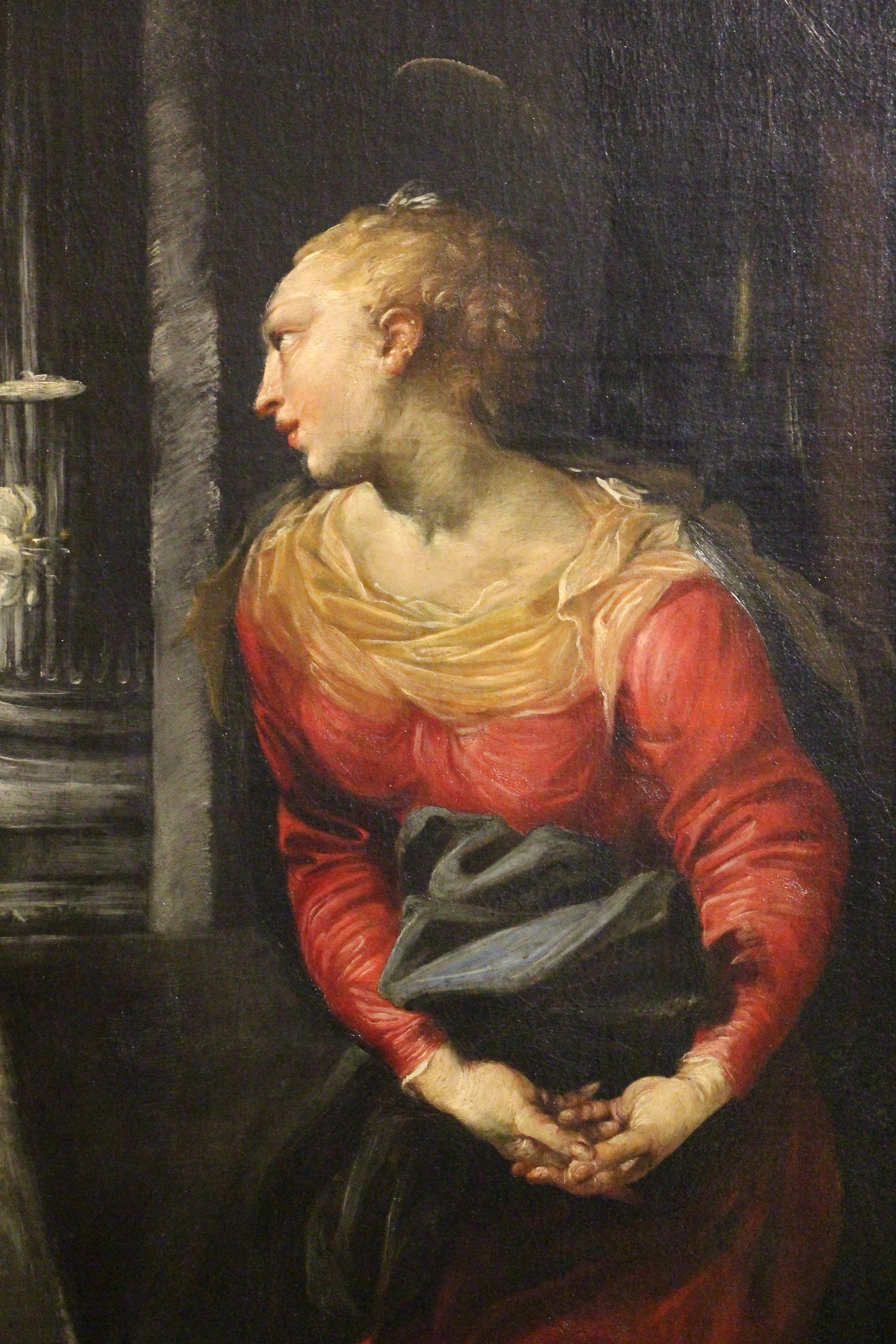
Annunciation (particular)

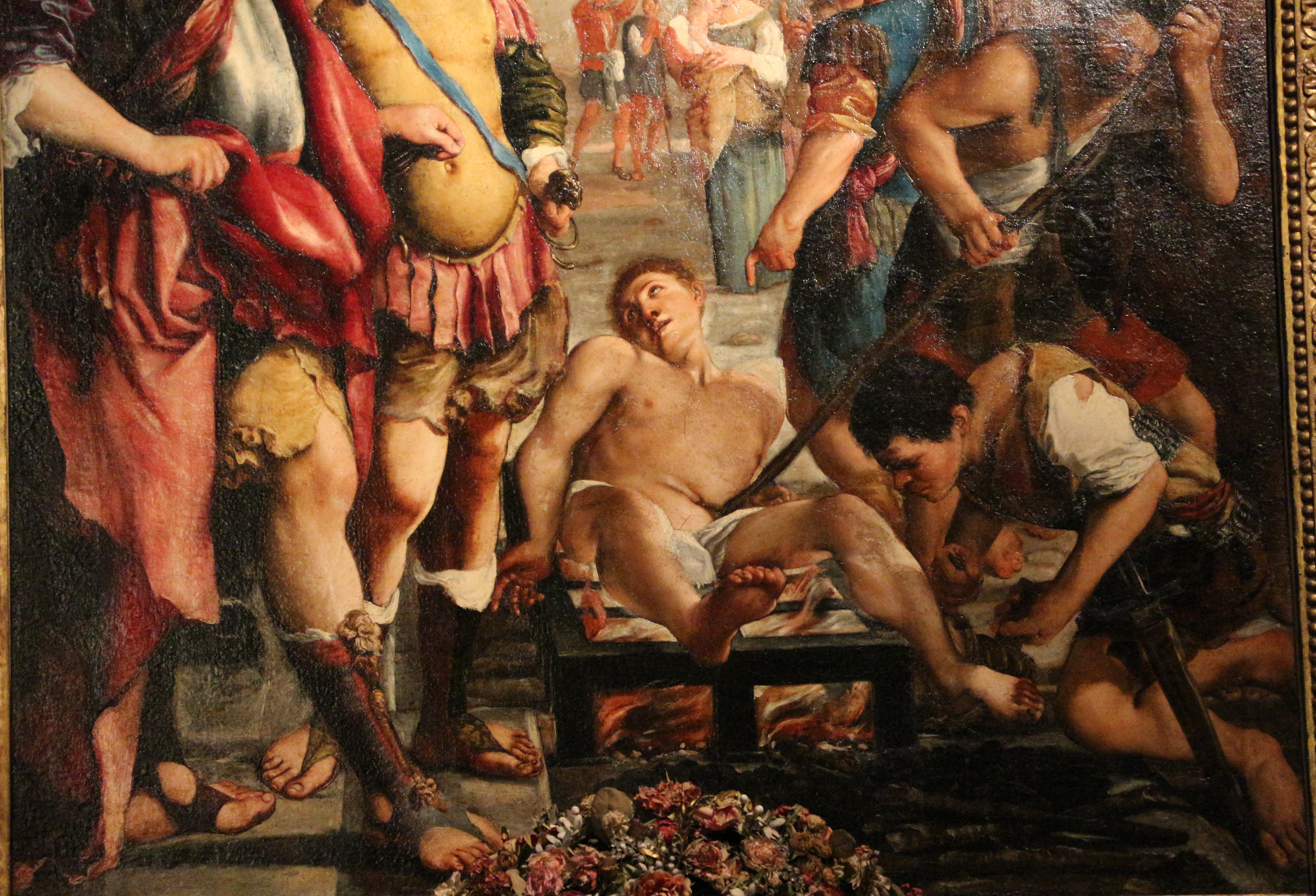
The Martyrdom of Saint Lawrence (particular)

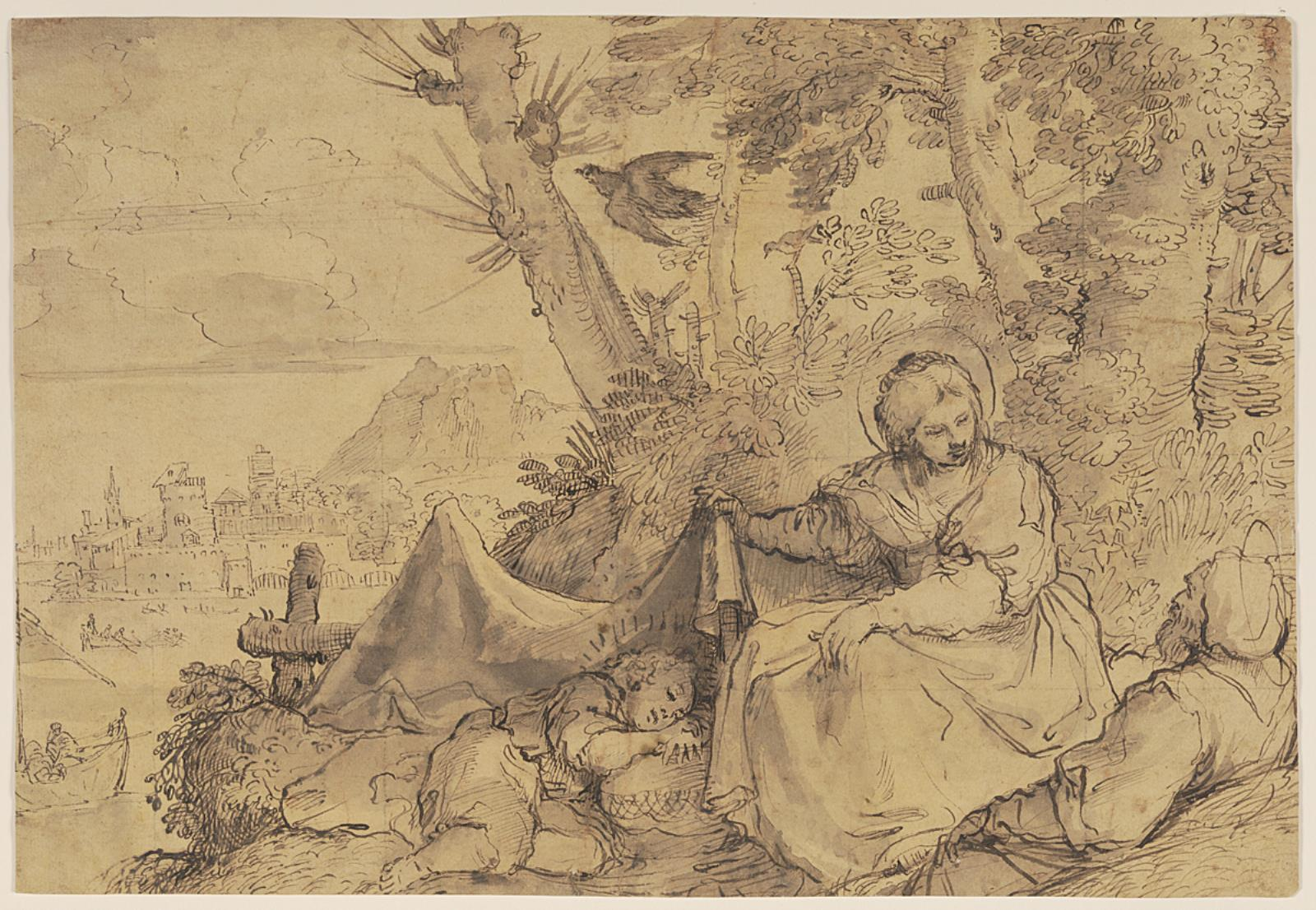
Rest on the Flight into Egypt

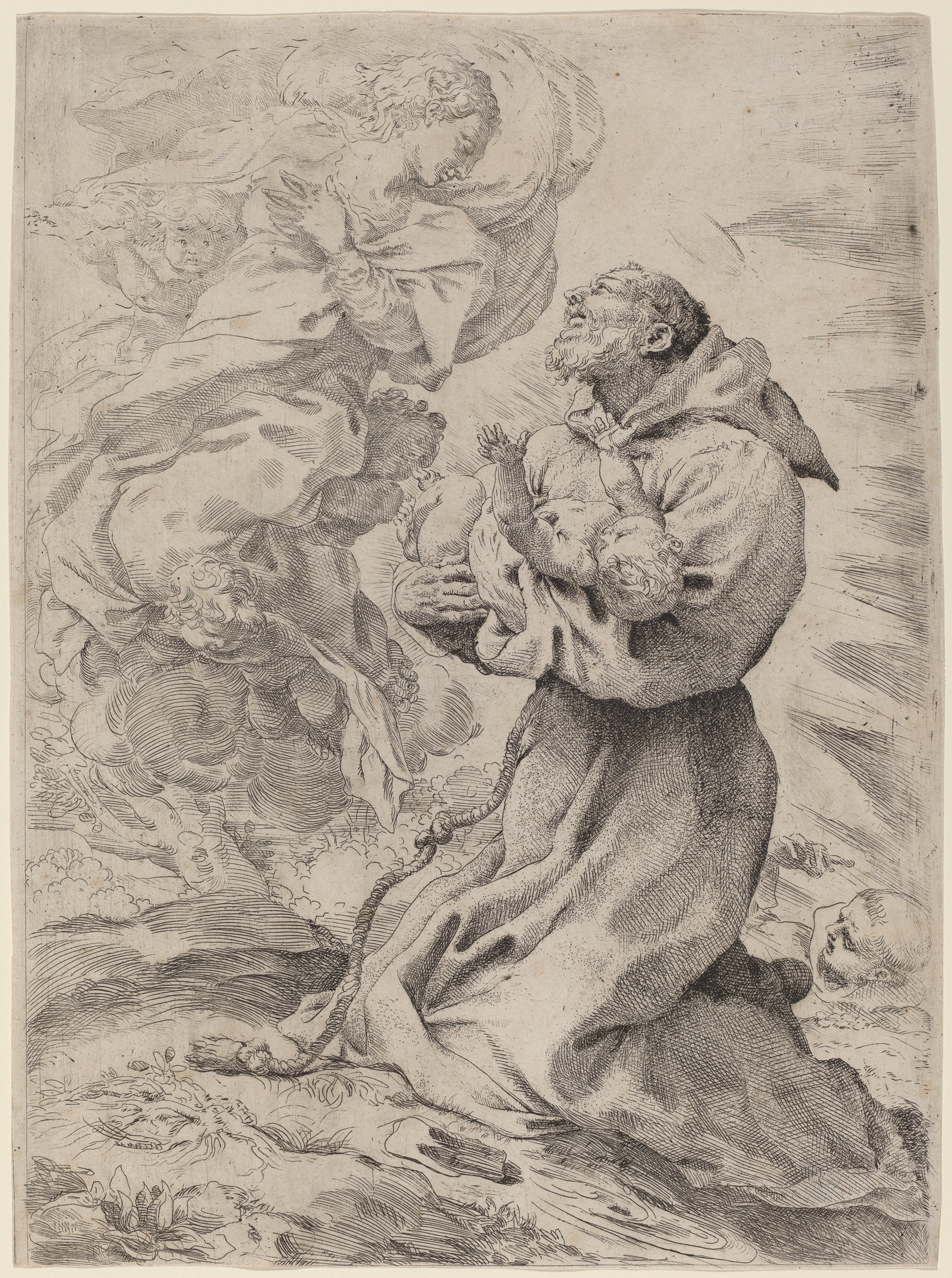
Saint Francis Receiving the Christ Child in the Presence of the Virgin

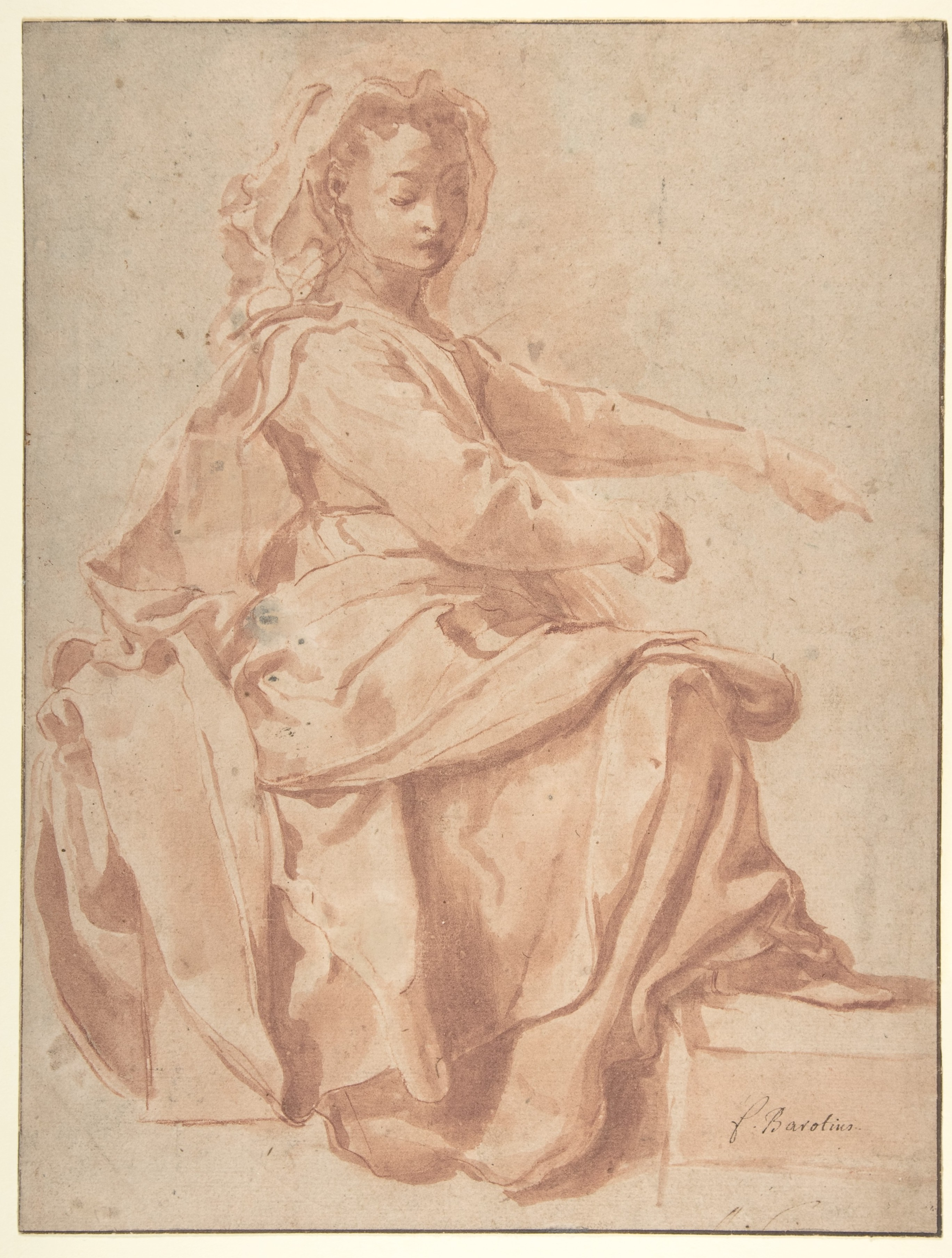
Seated Female Figure

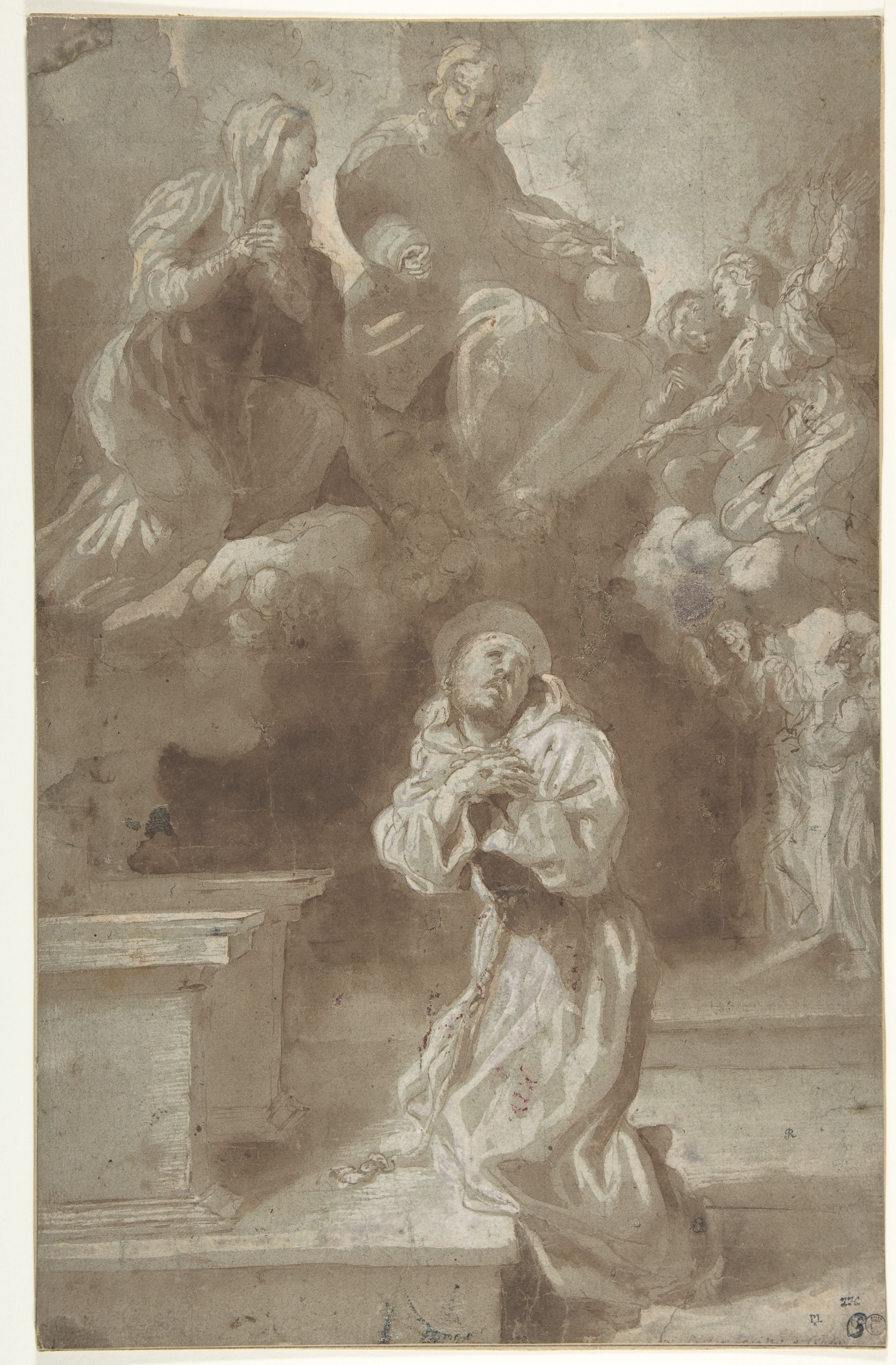
Christ and the Virgin Appearing to Saint Francis
