= Filomena Delli Castelli =

Italian politician (1916–2010)

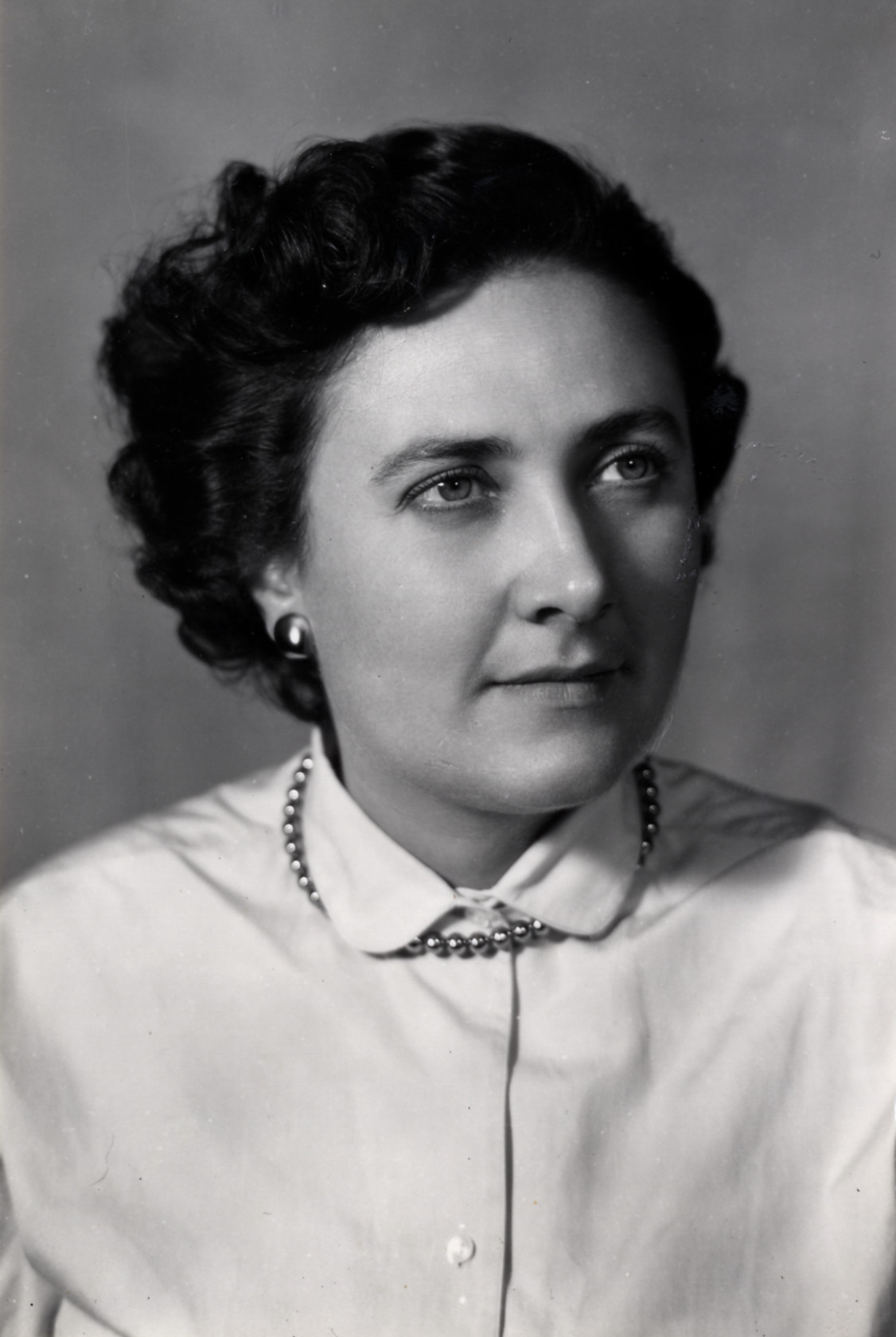
- Official portrait, 1948

Mayor of Montesilvano
- In office 1951–1955

Member of the Chamber of Deputies
- In office 1948–1953
- In office 1953–1958
- Constituency: L'Aquila

Member of the Constituent Assembly
- In office 1946–1948
- Constituency: L'Aquila

Personal details
- Born: 28 September 1916 Città Sant'Angelo, Abruzzi e Molise, Kingdom of Italy
- Died: 22 December 2010 (aged 94) Pescara, Abruzzo, Italy
- Party: Christian Democracy
- Occupation: Politician; television screenwriter

Filomena Delli Castelli (28 September 1916 – 22 December 2010) was an Italian politician. She was elected to the Constituent Assembly in 1946 as one of the first group of women parliamentarians in Italy. She was subsequently elected to the Chamber of Deputies in 1948, serving (with the exception of a six-month spell in 1953) until 1958.

== Biography ==
Delli Castelli was born in Città Sant'Angelo, Abruzzi e Molise, in 1916. After her father emigrated to America, she was raised by her mother. She studied literature and philosophy at the Università Cattolica del Sacro Cuore in Milan, and then worked as a teacher. Having become a member of the youth movement of Azione Cattolica, she served as its president while studying for a master's degree, also joining the Italian Catholic Federation of University Students in 1940. During World War II, she became an instructor at the teaching seminary where she had trained. She served as a nurse in the Red Cross and was part of the anti-German resistance, looking after refugees in Pescara province.

After joining the Christian Democracy party, Delli Castelli became provincial secretary of its women's section. In 1945 she moved to Rome to work in the press office of the Prime Minister. In the 1946 general elections, she was a Christian Democracy candidate in L'Aquila, and was one of 21 women elected to the Constituent Assembly. She was re-elected in 1948, and in 1951 became mayor of Montesilvano, a role she held until 1955. Although she lost her seat in parliament the June 1953 elections, she returned to the Chamber of Deputies in December 1953 when she replaced Giuseppe Castelli Avolio, who had resigned after being appointed to the judiciary. She lost her seat again in the 1958 elections.

Delli Castelli subsequently worked for RAI until 1975, focussing on children's television, after which she moved to Pescara. She died in the city in 2010. In 2019, one of the bridges between Città Sant'Angelo and Montesilvano was named after her.
