= Giuseppe Castelli (footballer) =

Italian footballer

Personal information
- Date of birth: September 14, 1919
- Place of birth: Milan, Italy
- Position: Midfielder

Senior career*
| Years | Team | Apps | (Gls) |
| 1938–1939 | Legnano | 5 | (1) |
| 1939–1941 | Ambrosiana-Inter | 4 | (0) |
| 1941–1942 | Liguria | 20 | (11) |
| 1942–1943 | Cremonese | 1 | (0) |
| 1943–1944 | Pro Patria | 5 | (0) |
| 1945–1946 | Sampierdarenese | 22 | (2) |
| 1946–1949 | Varese | 110 | (4) |
| 1949–1950 | Torrese | | |
| 1950–1954 | Acireale | 52 | (2) |
- * Club domestic league appearances and goals

Giuseppe Castelli (born September 14, 1919 in Milan) was an Italian professional football player.
