= David Castelli =

Italian scholar and educator

- Born: December 30, 1836; Leghorn, Grand Duchy of Tuscany
- Died: 1901; Florence, Italy
- Occupations: Scholar, educator
- Known for: Secular Jewish studies; introduction of the historical-critical method in Italy

David Castelli (December 30, 1836, Leghorn, Tuscany – 1901, Florence) was an Italian scholar and educator in the field of secular Jewish studies.

== Biography ==
David Castelli was born in Livorno, a city which in the 19th century, under the guidance of Rabbi Elia Benamozegh, became the seat of one of the liveliest Italian Jewish communities of the time.

He was educated at the rabbinical college of Leghorn, and from 1857 to 1863 was teacher of Hebrew and Italian in the Jewish schools of that city. Then he became secretary of the Jewish congregation in Pisa, where at the same time he was a private teacher. From January 1876 until his death he occupied the chair of Hebrew at the Istituto di Studi Superiori Pratici e di Perfezionamento in Florence.

Of Castelli's numerous works and essays the following may be mentioned. Initiated by his father to the rabbinical profession, Castelli was self-taught for his higher education until from 1857 to 1863 he was a teacher of Hebrew language and literature in the schools of the city.

Castelli was the first biblical scholar to introduce in Italy the strand of the so-called "historical-critical method," begun in Germany by Ferdinand Christian Baur (1792–1860) and the Tübingen School, and taken up by David Strauss and Ludwig Feuerbach. This model of critical approach contrasted with the tradition of textual and philological biblical exegesis (renamed lower criticism), and was the projection of a broader existential and cultural program of rupture with Judeo-Christian orthodoxy, in favor of national identities and its absorption into a Laicism and Universalism.

Castelli translated from Hebrew into Italian the Book of Job, Ecclesiastes, the Song of Songs, publishing various studies on Jewish history, politics and law.

== Works ==
- L'Ecclesiaste, Traduzione e Studio Critico, Pisa, 1866
- Leggende Talmudiche, Traduzione con Prefazione Critica, Pisa, 1869
- Il Messia Secondo gli Ebrei Florence, 1874
- Il Diritto di Testare nella Legislazione Ebraica, Florence, 1878
- Della Poesia Biblica, Florence, 1878
- "Il Commento di Sabbatai Donnolo al Libro della Creazione, Testo Ebraico con Note Critiche e Introduzione in Ebraico e in Italiano", Florence, 1880, in Pubblicazioni del Regio Istituto di Studi Superiori
- La Profezia nella Biblia, Florence, 1882
- La Legge del Popolo Ebreo nel suo Storico Svolgimento, Florence, 1884
- Storia degli Israeliti Secondo le Fonti Bibliche Criticamente Esposte, 2 vols., Milan, 1887–88
- Il Cantico dei Cantici, Studio Esegetico, Traduzione e Note, Florence, 1892
- Ammaestramenti del Vecchio e del Nuovo Testamento, Raccolti e Tradotti, Florence, 1896
- Il Poema Semitico del Pessimismo (Il Libro di Job), Tradotto e Commentato, Florence, 1897
- Gli Ebrei, Sunto di Storia Politica e Letteraria, Florence, 1899

== Bibliography ==
- (in Italian) Facchini, C., David Castelli. Ebraismo e scienze delle religioni tra Otto e Novecento, Brescia: Morcelliana, 2005
