= Michelangelo Castelli =

Italian politician (1808–1875)

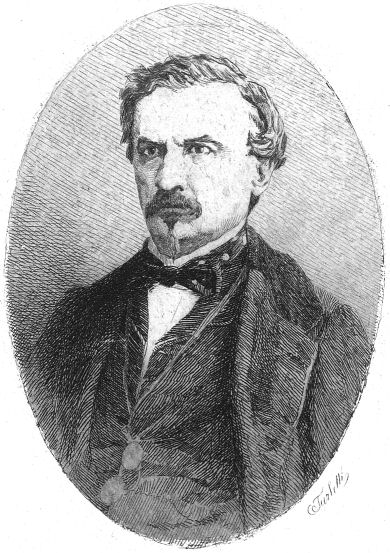
- Born: 4 December 1808; Racconigi, Italy
- Died: 20 August 1875 (aged 66); Turin, Italy

Michelangelo Castelli (4 December 1808 - 20 August 1875) was an Italian politician and writer.

== Biography ==
Born in Racconigi into a wealthy family of Jacobin ideas, Castelli studied law at the University of Turin, graduating in July 1835. In October of the same year he was elected, just 27 years old, Mayor of Racconigi, a position he held until 1837. From 1847 collaborated with the Turin-based newspaper Il Risorgimento, working in the political section alongside Camillo Benso, Count of Cavour, the director of the newspaper.

Friend and confidant of Cavour, Castelli was elected for the first time Member of Parliament of the Kingdom of Sardinia in its first legislature, in 1848. Deputy for five legislatures (1849–1859) in 1852 he was appointed Secretary of the Ministry of Interior, a position he held until March 1854. In July 1854, he was appointed General Director of the General Archives of Turin. On 29 June 1860, he was appointed Senator of the Kingdom of Sardinia.

Castelli was the first secretary of the Order of Saints Maurice and Lazarus.
