= Clément Castelli =

French painter (1870–1959)

Clément Castelli (14 January 1870 – 1959) was a French painter.

== Biography ==
Clément Castelli was born on 14 January 1870 in Premia, Italy. He was a member of the Mountain Painters Society. He moved to Paris in 1880, and studied under Jules Adler and Léon Bellemont. Clément Castelli spent most of his career painting mountains in the French Alps, in Italy, and in Switzerland. Clément Castelli has exhibited his works for many years at the Salon des Artistes Indépendants and at the Salon des Artistes Français.

== Bibliography ==
- Clément Castelli, mountains painter, Collection des cahiers de l'art contemporain, #28, Paris
- Clément Castelli, biography by Marcel Fromenteau, lauréat de l'Académie Française, Paris, 1937
- Bénézit Dictionary of French Artists
