= Annibale Castelli =

Italian painter

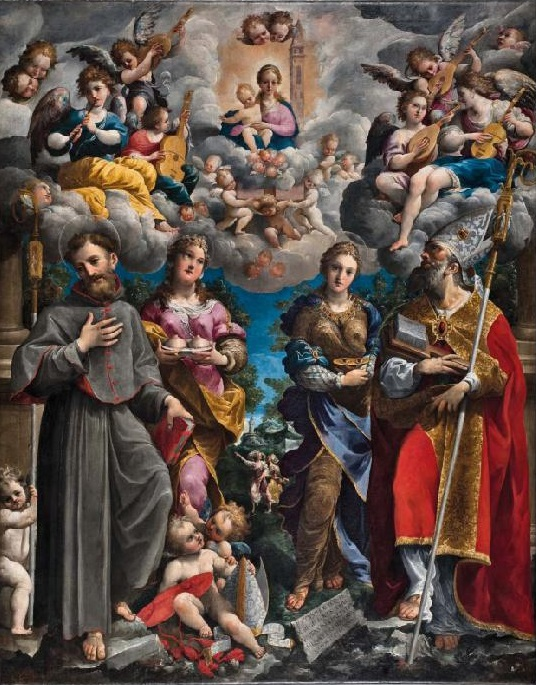
Madonna di Loreto col Bambino e Santi, The church of San Francesco, Mirandola

Annibale Castelli (1573 – 1623), was an Italian painter, active near his birthplace of Bologna.

== Biography ==
He painted religious iconography in oil and fresco. Annibale was a pupil of Pietro Faccini. He painted the Resurrection of Lazarus for the church of San Paolo in Bologna. He painted a mannerist Madonna and Child with Saints (1603).
