= Gaetano Castelli =

Italian painter and set designer

Gaetano Castelli (born 1938) is an Italian painter and set designer.
