= Federico II Pico della Mirandola =

Italian nobleman

- Prince of Mirandola
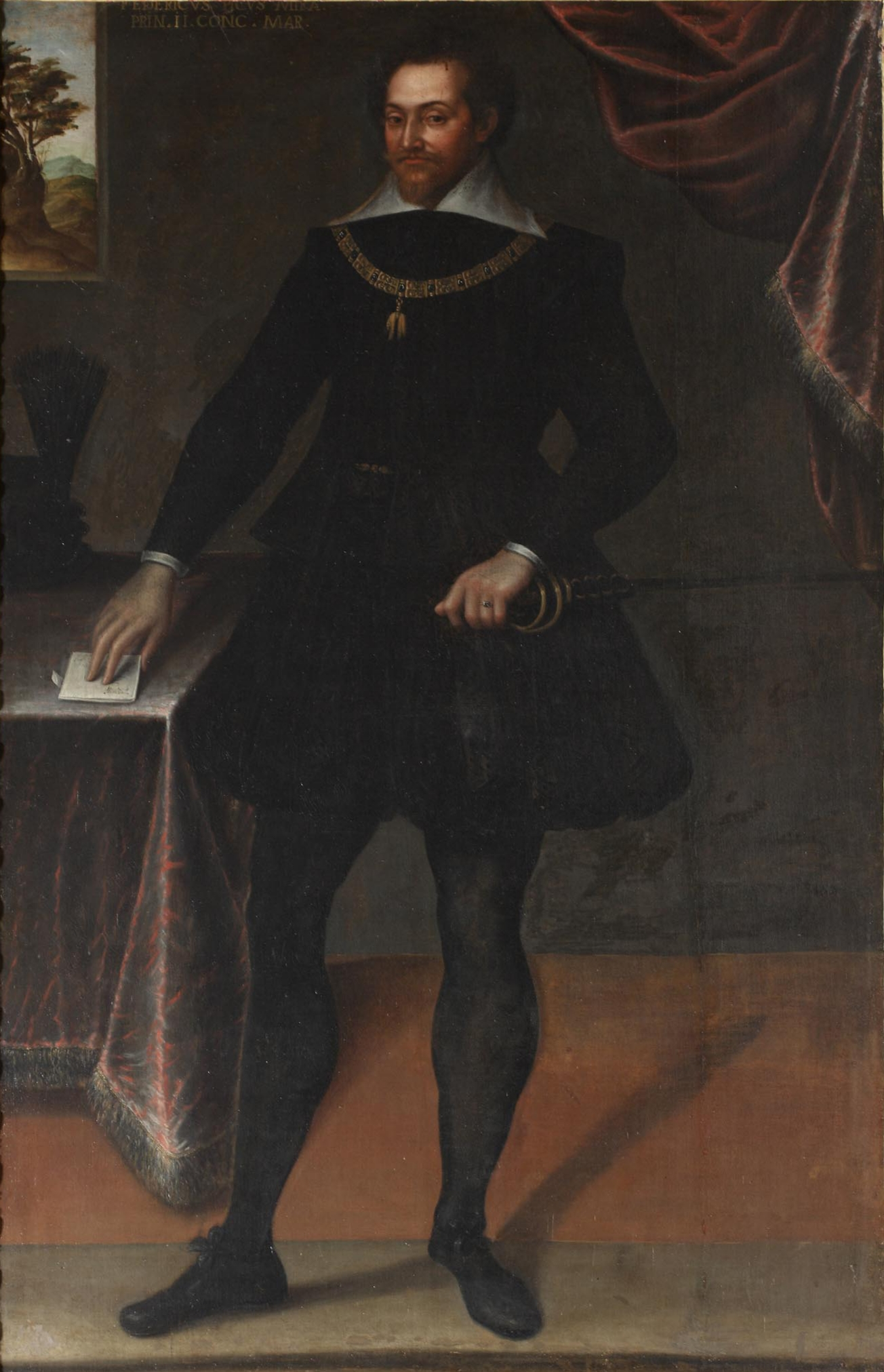
- Sante Peranda, Portrait of Federico II Pico della Mirandola
- Coat of arms: Coat of arms of Duchy of Mirandola.svg
- Predecessor: Galeotto III Pico della Mirandola
- Successor: Alessandro I Pico della Mirandola
- Other titles: Marquis of Concordia
- Born: 1564; Mirandola
- Died: 7 September 1602 (aged 37–38); Mirandola
- Buried: 1631; Church of St. Francis, Mirandola
- Noble family: Pico della Mirandola
- Spouse: Ippolita d'Este (died 1602)
- Father: Ludovico II Pico della Mirandola
- Mother: Fulvia da Correggio

Federico II Pico della Mirandola (1564 – 7 September 1602) was an Italian nobleman, last Count of Mirandola and Concordia (1592-1596) and first Prince of Mirandola and Marquis of Concordia (1596-1602).

== Life ==
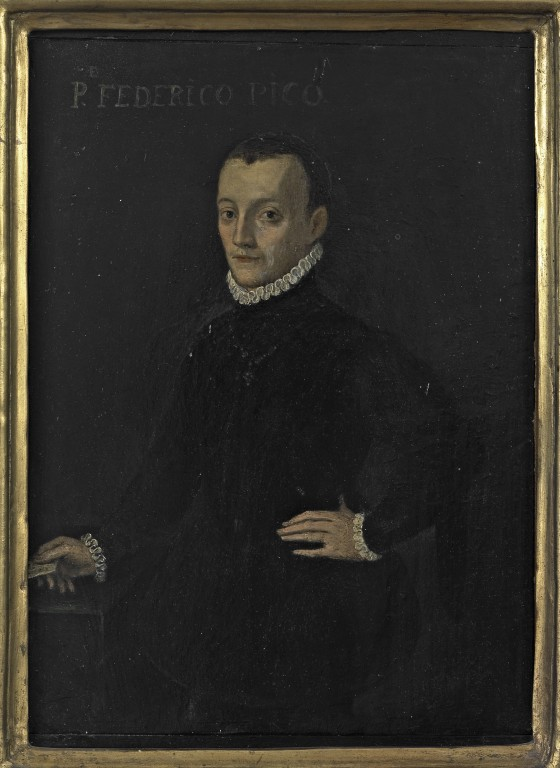
Federico II Pico (Civic Museum of Mirandola)

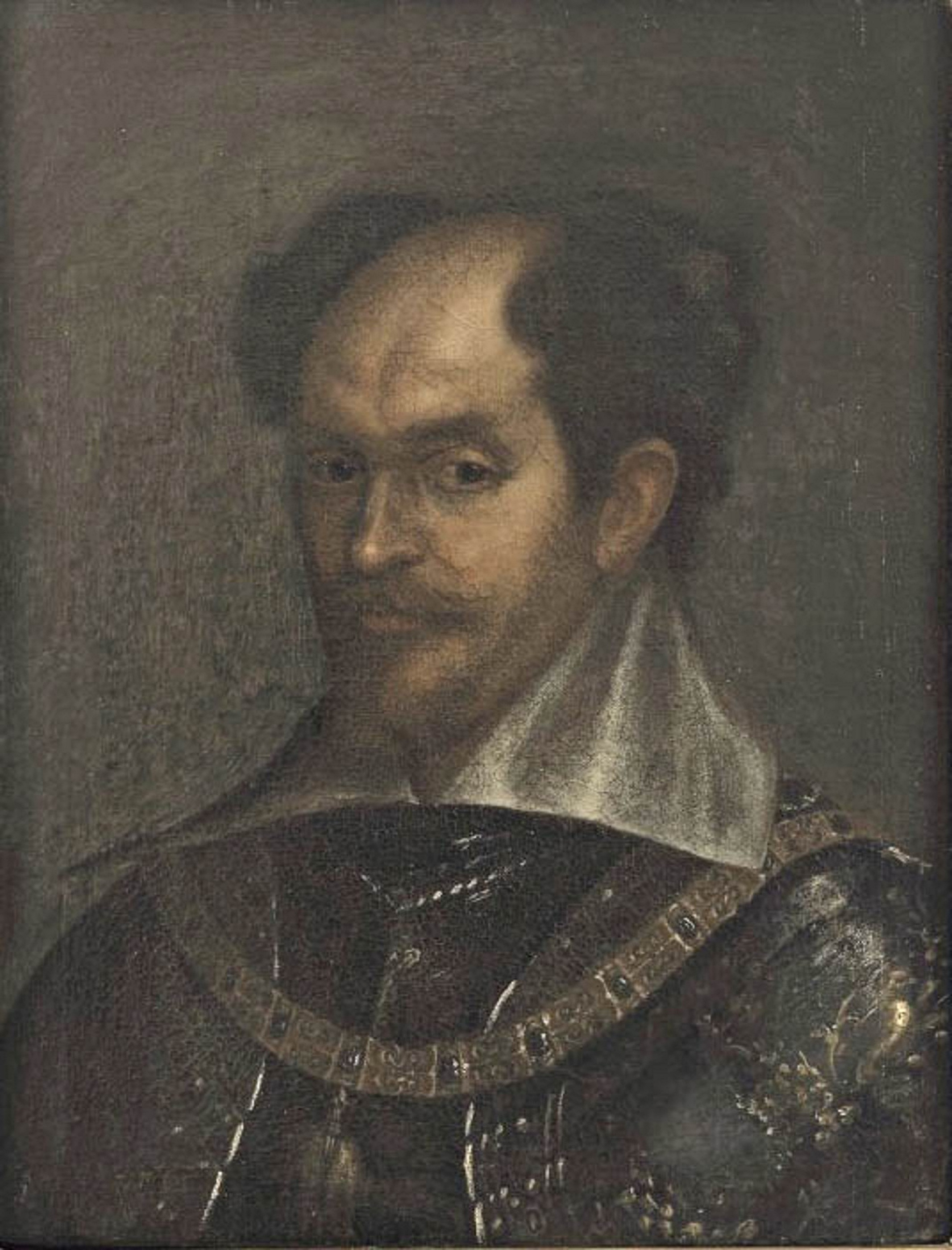
Ritratto di Federico II Pico Civic Museum of Mirandola)

Second son of Ludovico II Pico della Mirandola, Count of Mirandola and Concordia, and Fulvia da Correggio, Federico II studied literature and philosophy in Ferrara and then law in Padua with his brother Alessandro, pupils of Giacomo Menochio.

Federico II married Ippolita d'Este (1565-1602), the only daughter of Alfonso d'Este, marquis of Montecchio by his second wife, Violante Signa (1546-1609), but they did not have children.

Successor to his brother Galeotto III, who abdicated on 21 February 1592 for health reasons, he abandoned the protection of the King of France (obtained by his grandfather Galeotto I following the assassination of Giovanni Francesco II Pico) to return under the Holy Roman Empire, having petitioned Emperor Rudolph II in 1593, also taking advantage of the fact that the other branch of the Pico family (that of the descendants of the assassinated Giovanni Francesco II) had died out in 1588 for lack of heirs.

Federico II thus obtained the investiture of the fiefs in 1596 together with his brother Galeotto III (who died the following year) and on that occasion Mirandola obtained the title of City and was raised to Principality, while Concordia became a Marquisate.

In 1597, he cooperated in the reintegration of the Sacro Monte di Pietà of Mirandola. He was also a member of the Accademia degli Intenti in Pavia.

In 1602, shortly before his death, he also signed an agreement with Philip III of Spain, who granted him a pension that could also be passed on to his heirs.

In the beginning of 1602, an epidemic of pestilential fever called 'burraschetta' broke out in Mirandola, causing over 200 people to die within three months. The Mirandola rulers, who in the meantime had taken refuge in Reggio Emilia, then asked for divine grace, supplicating the holy image of the Virgin placed on the northern gate of the walls. While the epidemic seemed to have ended, in April, Federico II commissioned the construction of the Oratory of the Blessed Virgin of the Gate (today known as the Church of the Madonnina) by grace received. However, on 20 April his wife Princess Ippolita d'Este fell victim to the same strange flu, dying on 1 May at the age of just 36. She was buried at the monastery of the Franciscan tertiaries, next to the church of San Francesco. Grief over the loss of her beloved companion also caused the death of Federico II four months later, also at the age of 36. Having no more children, the Principality of Mirandola passed to his brother Alessandro I Pico, who had to abandon his ecclesiastical career.

== Bibliography ==
- Cronaca della nobilissima famiglia Pico scritta da autore anonimo. Mirandola: Tipografia di Gaetano Cagarelli. 1874.
- Memorie storiche della città e dell'antico ducato della Mirandola. Vol. III. Mirandola: Tipografia di Gaetano Cagarelli. 1876.
- Don Felice Ceretti (1892). Il principe Federico II Pico ed Ippolita d'Este lui consorte. IV. Vol. II. pp. 233–264.
- Pompeo Litta (1835). Famiglie celebri di Italia. Pico della Mirandola. Torino. p. 4.
- Giovanni Veronesi (1847). Quadro storico della Mirandola e della Concordia. Mirandola.

== See also ==
- Castle of the Pico
- Duchy of Mirandola
- Mirandola Mint
