= Alessandro I Pico della Mirandola =

Italian nobleman (1566–1637)

- Duke of Mirandola
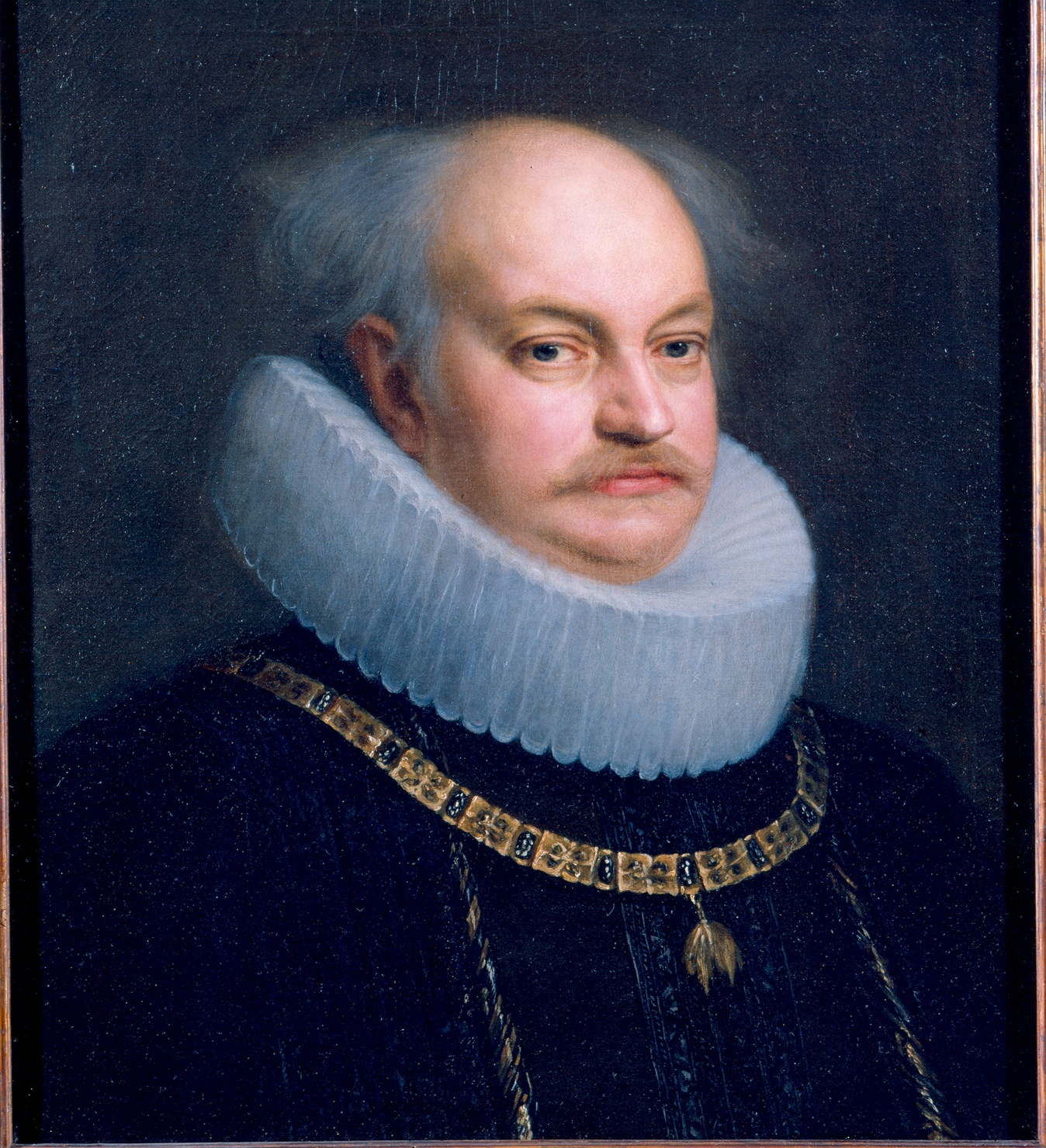

- Coat of arms
- Predecessor: Federico II Pico della Mirandola
- Successor: Alessandro II Pico della Mirandola
- Other titles: Marquis of Concordia
- Born: May 15, 1566; Mirandola
- Died: 2 December 1637 (aged 71); Mirandola
- Buried: 1637 church of St. Francis, Mirandola
- Noble family: Pico della Mirandola
- Spouse: Laura d'Este (m. 1607)
- Father: Ludovico II Pico della Mirandola
- Mother: Fulvia da Correggio

Alessandro I Pico della Mirandola (15 May 1566 – 2 December 1637) was an Italian nobleman and military man, second Marquis of Concordia (1602–1637), second and last Prince of Mirandola (1602–1617) and first Duke of Mirandola (1617–1637).

== Life ==
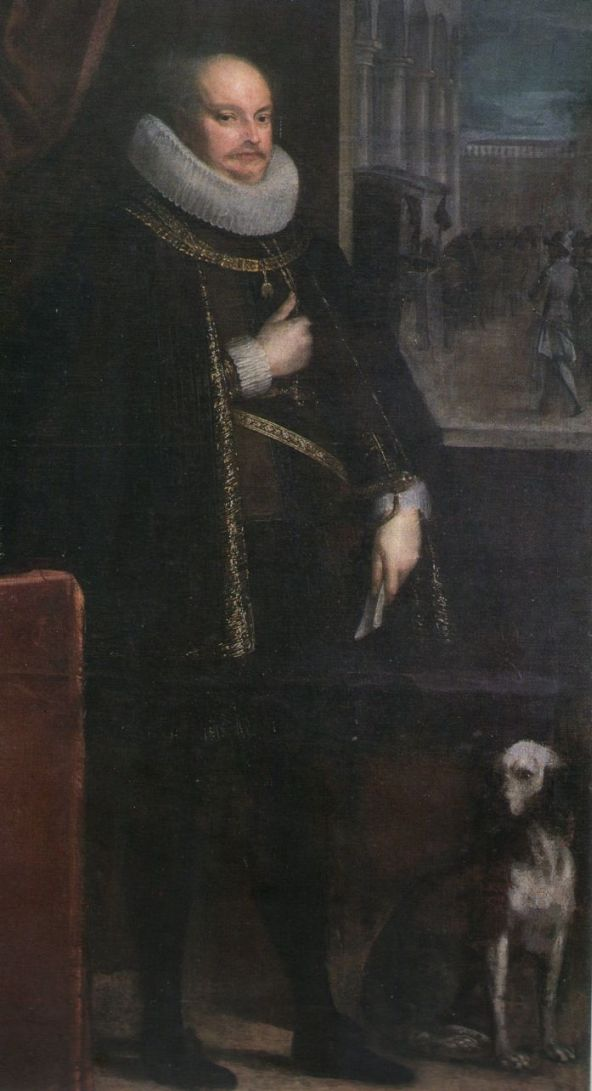
Sante Peranda, Portrait of Alessandro I Pico della Mirandola.

He was son of Ludovico II Pico della Mirandola, count of Mirandola and Concordia, and of Fulvia da Correggio.

He was initially in the service of Henry IV of France and in 1602, succeeding Frederick II, he remained loyal to the emperors, who confirmed his investiture in the fiefdoms, appointing him a knight of the Order of the Golden Fleece in 1605, the ceremony of which took place on 18 October 1606 in the church of San Pietro in Modena.

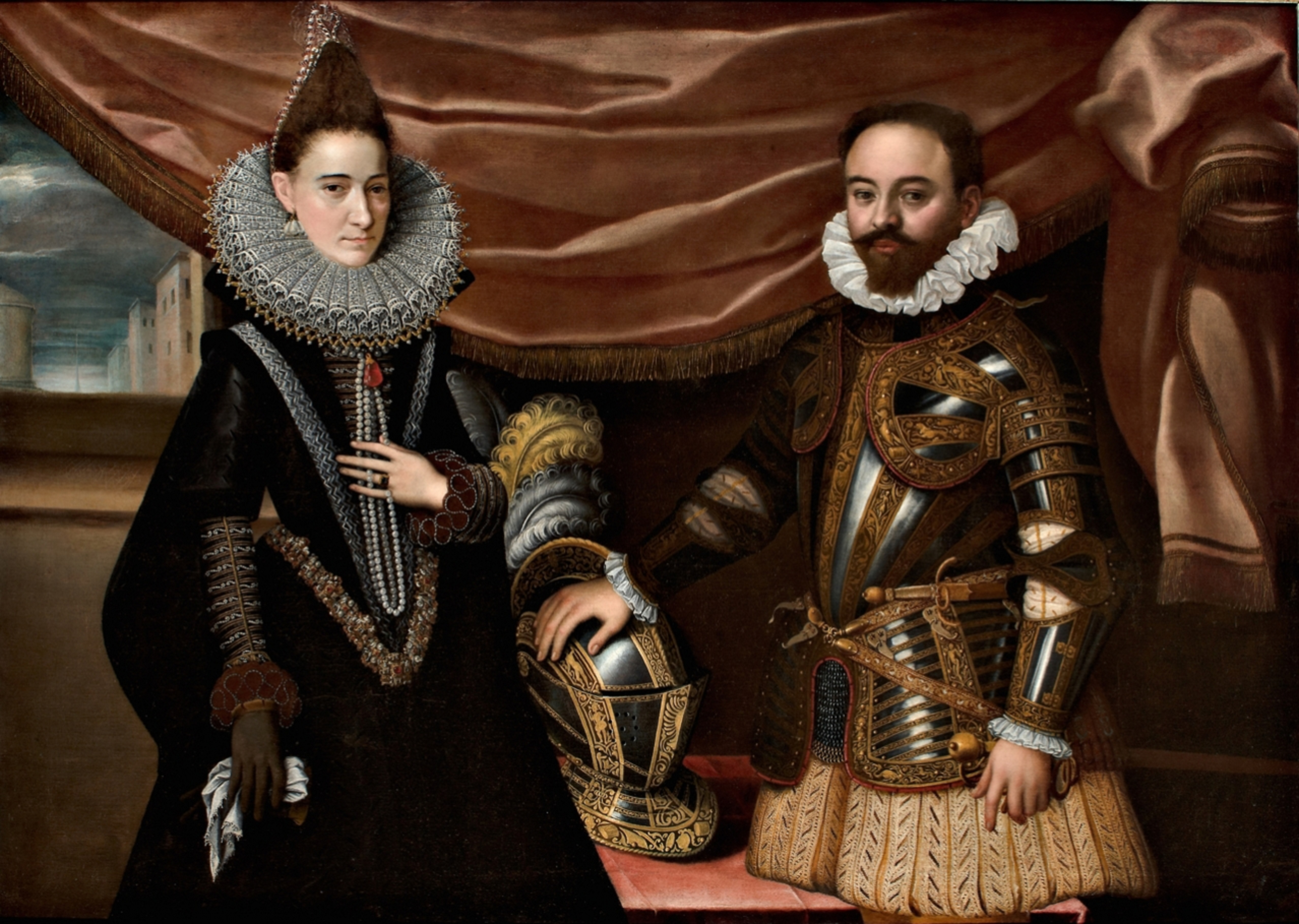
Sante Peranda, Portrait of Laura d'Este and Alessandro I Pico della Mirandola

In 1607 in Modena, Alessandro I Pico married Laura d'Este, daughter of Cesare d'Este, Duke of Modena and Reggio, and Virginia de' Medici, daughter of the Tuscan Grand Duke Cosimo I de' Medici and Camilla Martelli. Despite his bride's precarious health, this led to the birth of eight daughters, but not the desired male successor. He also had an illegitimate son, Galeotto IV, by his lover, the Ferrarese noblewoman Eleonora Segni (or Signa), legitimised by the emperor and destined to succeed his father. However, the latter died a few months before his father, but not before giving birth to many children, including his successor Alessandro II Pico della Mirandola.

He was suspected, along with other nobles, of participating in the conspiracy against Ranuccio I Farnese, Duke of Parma, which led to the beheading of Pio Torelli, Count of Montechiarugolo, in 1612. Alessandro was exonerated and, with a diploma of 6 March 1617 signed in Prague by the Emperor of the Holy Roman Empire Matthias of Habsburg (subject to payment of 100,000 florins), he obtained the imperial appointment as Duke of Mirandola. He founded the Mirandola seminary and introduced the Jesuits there, for whom he had the monumental church of Gesù built.

In 1629, he took part in the War of the Mantuan Succession. The siege of Mantua by the troops of Rambaldo XIII di Collalto did not spare some agricultural areas around Mirandola, a city that escaped occupation thanks to the intervention of Alessandro Pico, who pledged his family's gold and agentry.

He died at the end of 1637 and was buried next to his wife Laura d'Este (who died of the plague in 1630) in the church of San Francesco in Mirandola, pending the completion of the church of Gesù. However, the bodies of the first dukes of Mirandola were never moved.

== Bibliography ==
- Pompeo Litta (1835). Famiglie celebri di Italia. Pico della Mirandola. Torino. [ISBN unspecified].
- Bruno Andreolli (2015). "PICO, Alessandro I". PICO, Alessandro I in "Dizionario Biografico". Dizionario biografico degli italiani. Vol. 83.

== See also ==
- Castle of the Pico
- Church of Gesù, Mirandola
- Duchy of Mirandola
- Mirandola Mint
