= Galeotto III Pico della Mirandola =

- Count of Mirandola
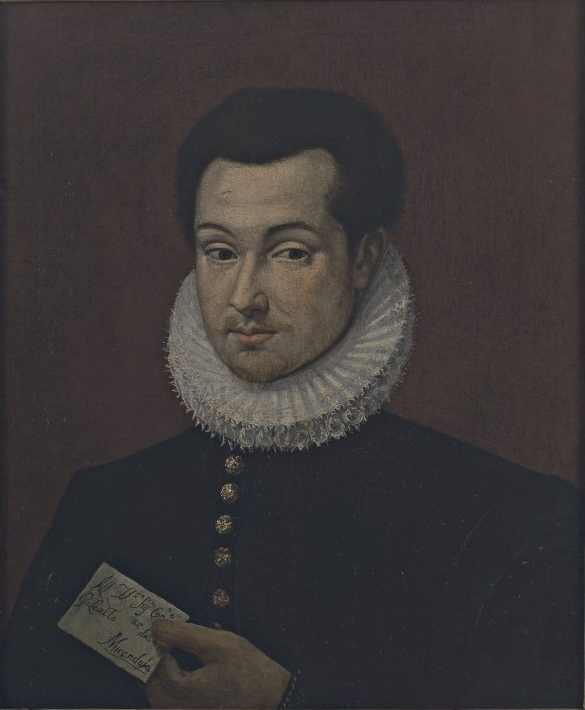
- Coat of arms: Coat of arms of Duchy of Mirandola.svg
- Predecessor: Ludovico II Pico della Mirandola
- Successor: Federico II Pico della Mirandola
- Other titles: Count of Concordia
- Born: 1564; Mirandola
- Died: 16 August 1597 (aged 32–33); Mirandola
- Buried: 1631; Church of St. Francis, Mirandola
- Noble family: Pico della Mirandola
- Father: Ludovico II Pico della Mirandola
- Mother: Fulvia da Correggio

Galeotto III Pico della Mirandola (1564 – 16 August 1597) was an Italian nobleman, third Count of Mirandola and Concordia from 1568 to 1592, the year of his abdication due to health problems in favour of his brother Federico II Pico della Mirandola.

== Life ==
Son of Ludovico II Pico and Fulvia da Correggio, he was baptised on 3 February 1564 with the names Galeotto Giovanni Battista by Cardinal Federico Gonzaga in the presence of the Duke of Ferrara Alfonso II d'Este and the godmothers Barbara of Austria and the Duchess of Urbino by proxy of their ministers.

At the age of four, he succeeded his father (who died in November 1568) in the government of the State of Mirandola under the tutelage of his mother and uncles Ippolito (?-1569) and Luigi (1526-1581), as well as with the support of King Charles IX of France, who then elected him Capitain, Gentilhomme de la Chambre, and Knight of the Order of Saint Michael.

His mother Fulvia held the regency of Mirandola until her death in 1590, due to the fits of epilepsy from which Galeotto suffered, who decided on 21 February 1592 to cede the government of the Mirandola fiefs and all his allodial possessions to his brother Federico II; the latter, as a sign of respect and modesty, never wanted to publicly use the title of Lord until his brother's death, leaving him the rights and honour of ruling. Also in 1592 he took the cross of Knight of Malta.

In 1593, the Pico brothers abandoned the protection of the King of France (obtained from their grandfather Galeotto I Pico following the assassination of Giovanni Francesco II Pico) to return under the Holy Roman Empire, also taking advantage of the fact that the other branch of the Pico family (that of the descendants of the assassinated Giovanni Francesco II) had already died out in 1588 for lack of heirs.

On 20 May 1596, Galeotto obtained from the bishop of Reggio Claudio Rangoni the institution of the Monte della Farina (Flour Mount) desired by his mother, so that the regents of the Sacred Mount of Piety of Mirandola could distribute flour to the poor during the winter or famine (later, wheat was lent for a while, then this too ceased).

At the end of 1596, brothers Galeotto and Federico obtained a pardon from Emperor Rudolf II for what had happened in the previous 60 years and the official investiture of the fiefs. Furthermore, Mirandola obtained the title of City and was raised to principality, while Concordia became a marquisate. The arrival of the imperial letters was announced on 25 March 1597, which was followed by festivities for three evenings, with illuminations, the ringing of bells, artillery shots, donations of alms to the poor and amnesties.

After a long period of epileptic fits and fever, Galeotto died on 16 August 1597 at the age of 33 years, and was buried in the church of San Francesco. On 1 September, the citizens took an oath of allegiance to Prince Federico.

== Bibliography ==
- Cronaca della nobilissima famiglia Pico scritta da autore anonimo. Mirandola: Tipografia di Gaetano Cagarelli. 1874.
- Papotti, Francesco Ignazio (1876). Annali della Mirandola. Vol. III. Mirandola: Tipografia di Gaetano Cagarelli.
- Litta, Pompeo (1835). Famiglie celebri di Italia. Pico della Mirandola. Torino. p. 4.
- Veronesi (1847). Quadro storico della Mirandola e della Concordia. Mirandola: Arci Nova.

== See also ==
- Castle of the Pico
- Duchy of Mirandola
- Mirandola Mint
