= Lorenzo Comendu =

Italian painter

Lorenzo Comendù was an Italian painter of the Baroque era, active in Verona, painting large battle or historic canvass.

Son of a Veronese merchant, he studied with Biagio Falcieri in Verona, then Francesco Monti in Parma. He moved to Milan in 1700.
