= Church of Gesù, Mirandola =

Church building in Mirandola, Italy

Coordinates: 44.8884°N 11.0693°E

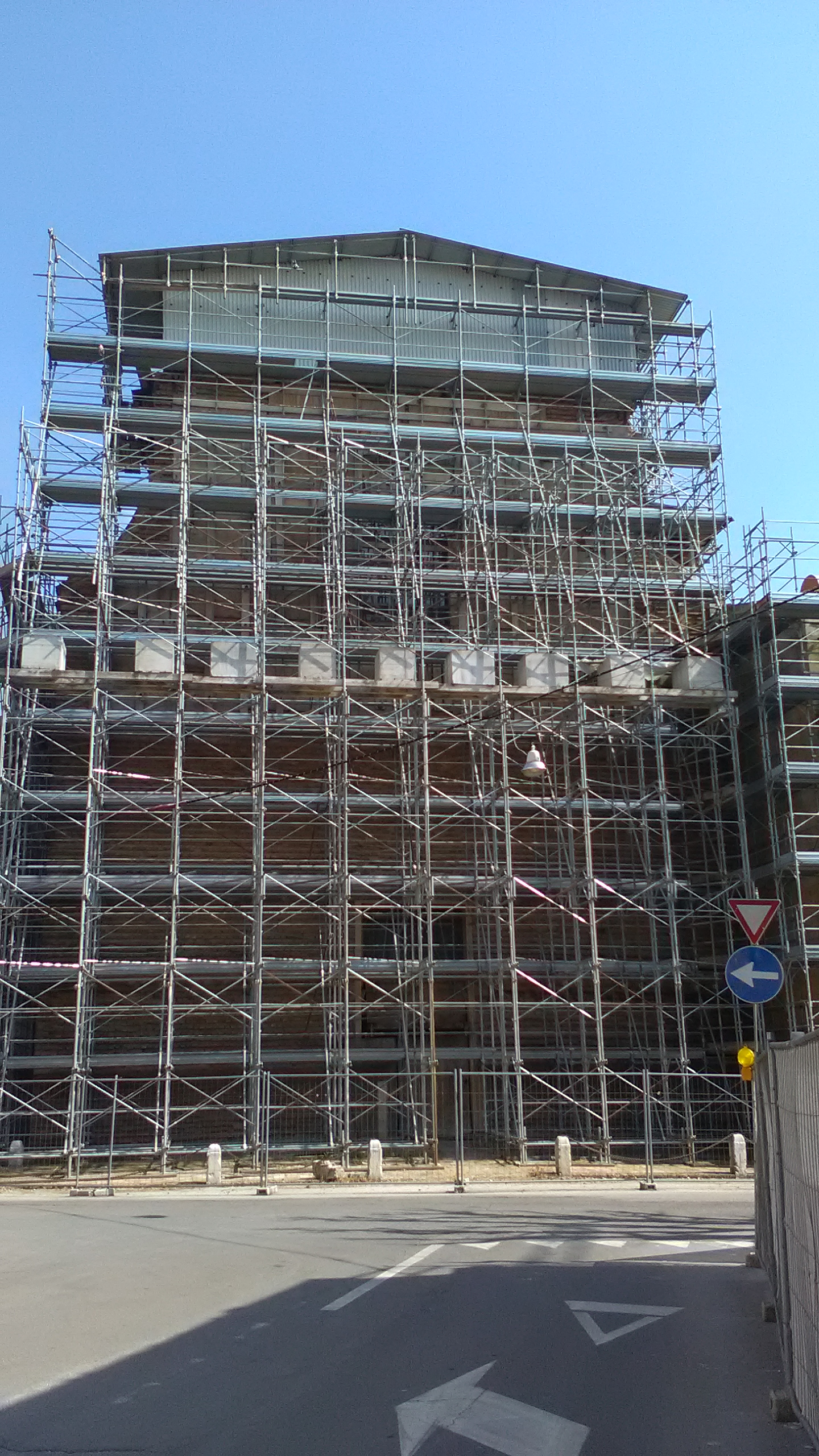
Church of Jesus in 2016

The Church of the Gesù is a Baroque style, Roman Catholic church on via Montanari, in the town of Mirandola, Province of Modena, Region of Emilia Romagna, Italy.

== History ==
This church, originally staffed by the Jesuit order, was commissioned by Alessandro I Pico when he was invested as Duke, and construction began in 1621 and completed in 1689. The facade remains incomplete and presents a simple brick front. The interior however has elaborate baroque decoration in its single nave. The interiors include an almost Churrigueresque wooden altar and pulpit. The main altar also has a polychrome marble altarpiece of the Circumcision by Innocenzo Monti. By the late 18th century, the expulsion of the Jesuits from the duchy was followed soon after by the Napoleonic invasions. The convent became hospital in 19th century now houses the city library and archives and other offices. The church roof partially fell in after 2012 Northern Italy earthquakes and has been undergoing restoration.
