= Castle of the Pico =

Historic building in Mirandola, Italy

- Castello dei Pico (in Italian)
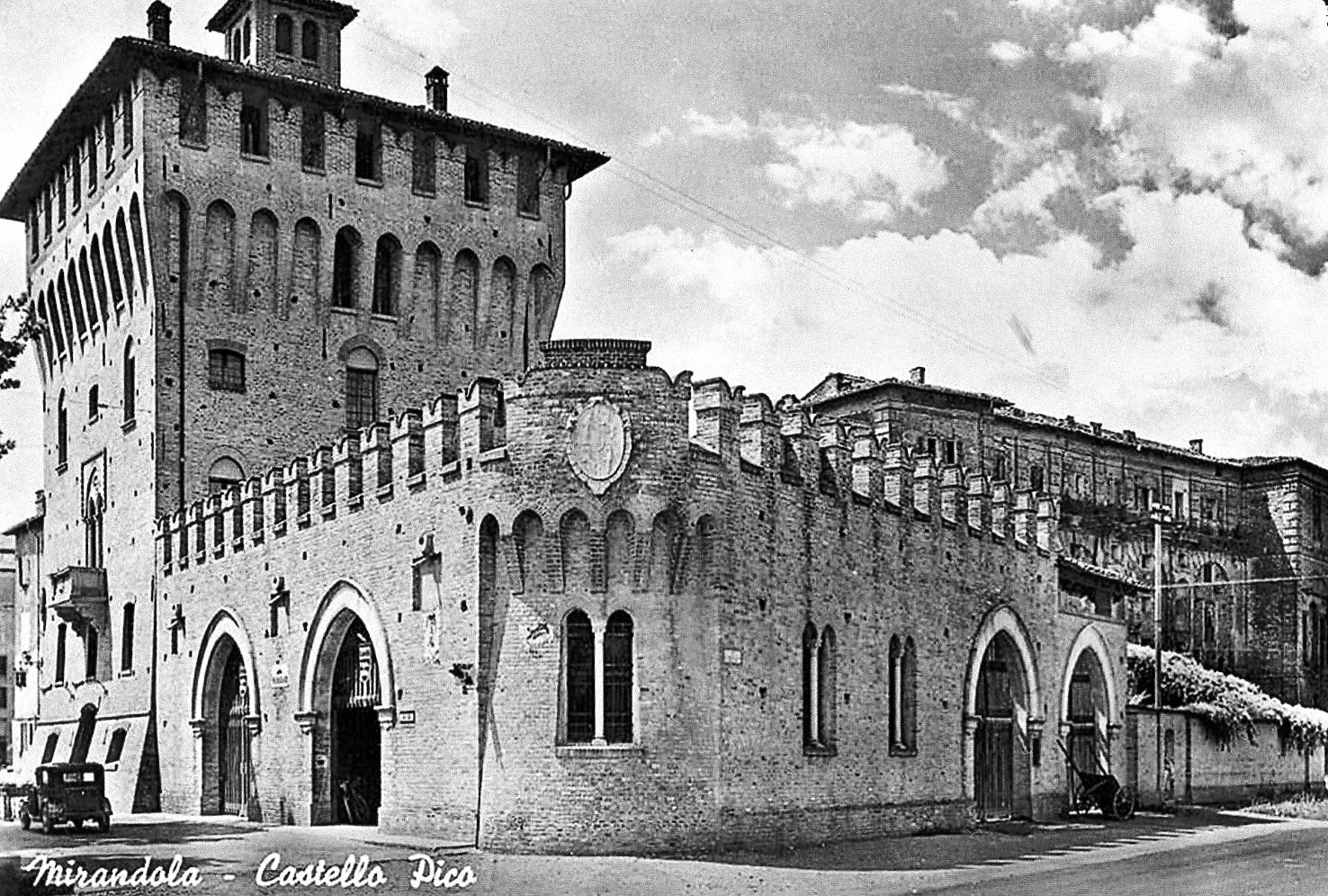
- Exterior view

- Location within Italy

General information
- Architectural style: Renaissance
- Location: Mirandola, Emilia-Romagna, Italy
- Coordinates: 44.8889°N 11.0649°E
- Construction started: 1102
- Owner: Municipality of Mirandola

The Castle of the Pico (in Italian Castello dei Pico) is a castle in the city center of Mirandola, in the province of Modena, Italy.

Famous in Europe for being impregnable, it belonged to the House of Pico della Mirandola, who ruled over the city for four centuries (1311-1711) and which also contributed important pieces of art in the Renaissance period.

The castle, which dominates the long Costituente square and Circonvallazione boulevard (built in place of the ancient walls, demolished during the 19th century), was restored in 2006 after many years of neglect, but was then severely damaged by the 2012 Northern Italy earthquakes, which made it unusable again.

== History ==
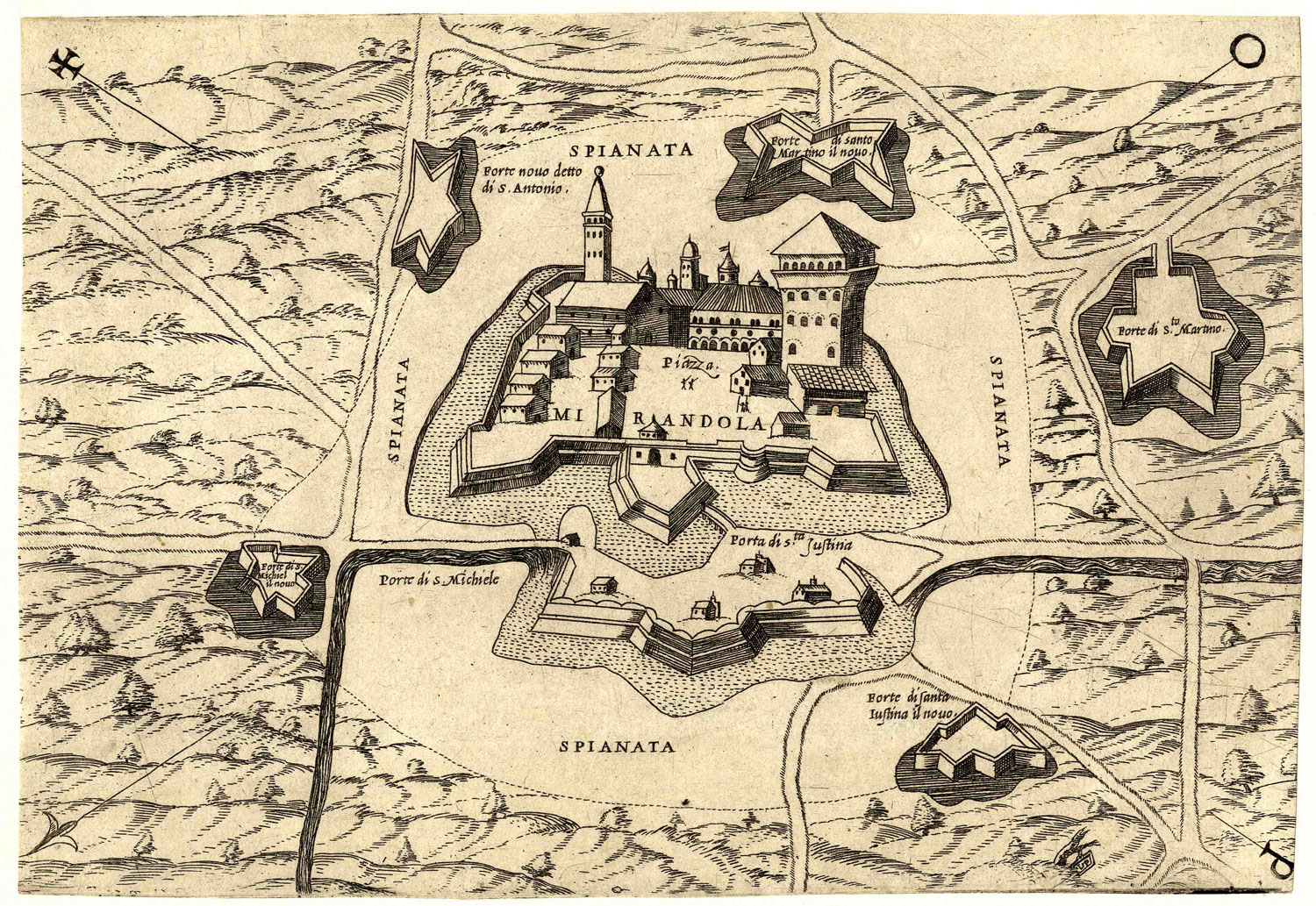
The castle of Mirandola (c. 1550)

=== Origins ===
The first evidence of the castle's existence dates back to the year 1102, although probably a primitive settlement existed during the Lombards era, around the year 1000.

The castle was located in a strategic position along the Imperial Romea route (which connected Germany to Rome), and it was later expanded to form a large quadrilateral surrounded by a moat.

=== Renaissance period ===
In 1500 Giovanni Francesco II Pico della Mirandola built the massive keep called il Torrione (the Big Tower), known to be unconquerable; the city was under sieges several times, including the most famous, the siege of 1510-1511 winter by Pope Julius II and the siege of 1551 by Pope Julius III.

The Pico family obtained the title of dukes in 1617 and enriched their castle, until it became one of the most important and sumptuous palaces in the Po Valley: among the most important works of art collected in the wing called la Galleria Nuova (the New Gallery), there were several paintings by the Venetians Jacopo Palma il Giovane e Sante Peranda.

The castle hosted Pope Julius II, Emperor Leopold I, Aldus Manutius, Borso d'Este and Ercole d'Este, Rodolfo Gonzaga, and Emperor Francis I.

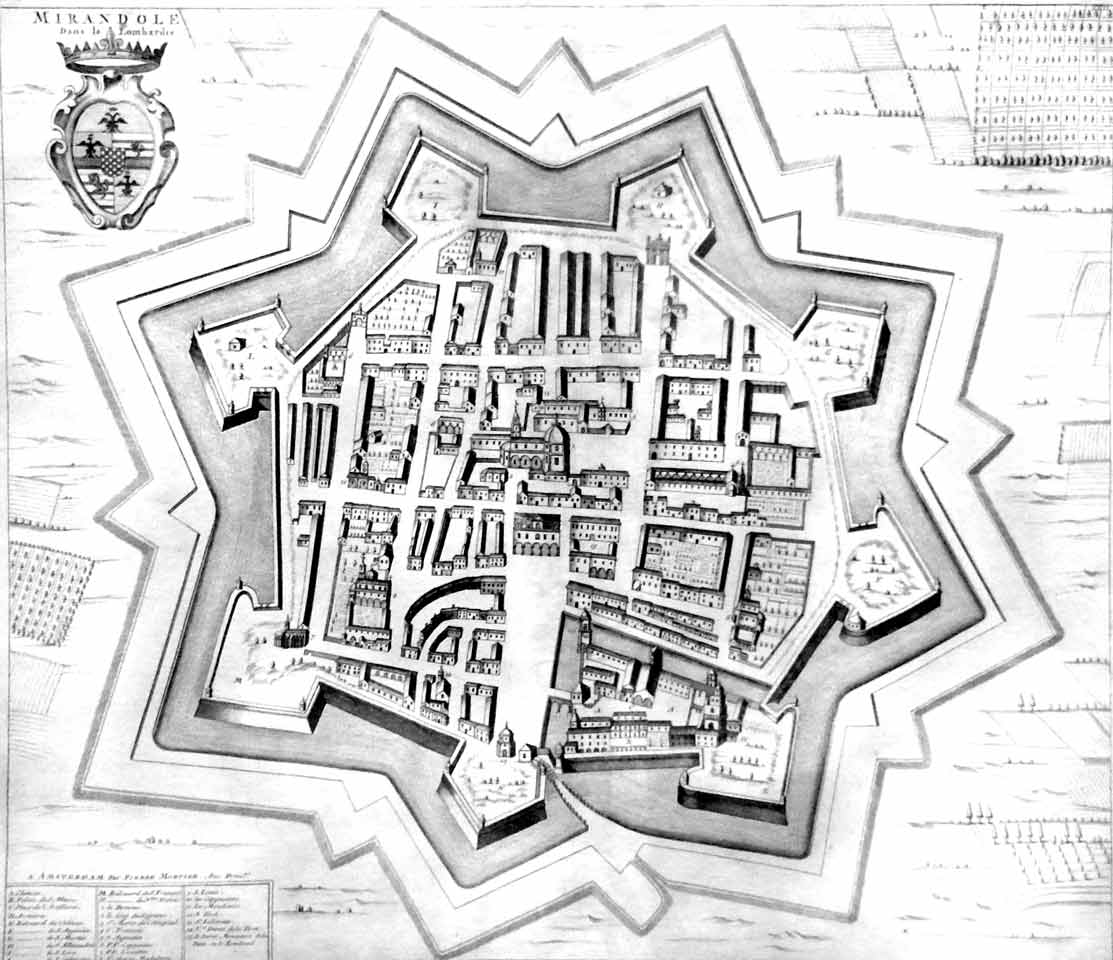
Walls of Mirandola in 18th century

=== Decadence ===
After the House of Este took over in 1711, the city of Mirandola began to decay. In 1714, the burning of artillery and gunpowder in the keep (due to lightning) destroyed much of the castle and seriously damaged all the buildings and churches in the city center. Towards the end of the 18th century, the Dukes of Modena destroyed many other parts of the castle.

=== Modern era ===
On 24 February 1867 the Italian government established that the urban belt of the city of Mirandola ceased to be considered as a fortified work, thus ceasing to be subject to military servitude the land adjacent to the works themselves.

At the beginning of the 20th century, around the 1930s, the city council attempted to rebuild the ancient keep of the castle (destroyed by fire in 1714), creating a massive neo-Gothic tower overlooking on the main square. The modern tower is characterized by dovetail merlons, typical of the pro-Imperial faction of the Ghibellines.

After the Second World War the castle was inhabited by 52 families (about 200 people), while the lounges were used for parties and carnivals. After years of absolute neglect and degradation, the castle was restored and reopened to the public in 2006, with a new Civic Museum and a cultural center, including an auditorium and other exhibition spaces.

=== 2012 earthquakes ===
Due to the serious damage suffered after the 2012 Emilia earthquake (estimated at about 10 million euros only for the municipal property, the castle has become unpracticable and closed to tourists, despite the urgent security works. After Minister of Cultural Heritage and Tourism Massimo Bray promised the return of the historical-artistic-cultural heritage of Mirandola, in April 2016, the city council approved a first recovery plan, with an estimated expenditure of about 4 million euros funded by the Emilia-Romagna region.

The damage to the twentieth century part amounts to about 600,000 euros, while only the safety had cost 400,000 euros.

All the collections of ancient cartographic maps and gold coins were temporarily transferred to the bank vault of the Unicredit in Modena, while all the paintings are temporarily housed in the Ducal Palace of Sassuolo.

== Description ==
=== Ducal Palace of Mirandola ===
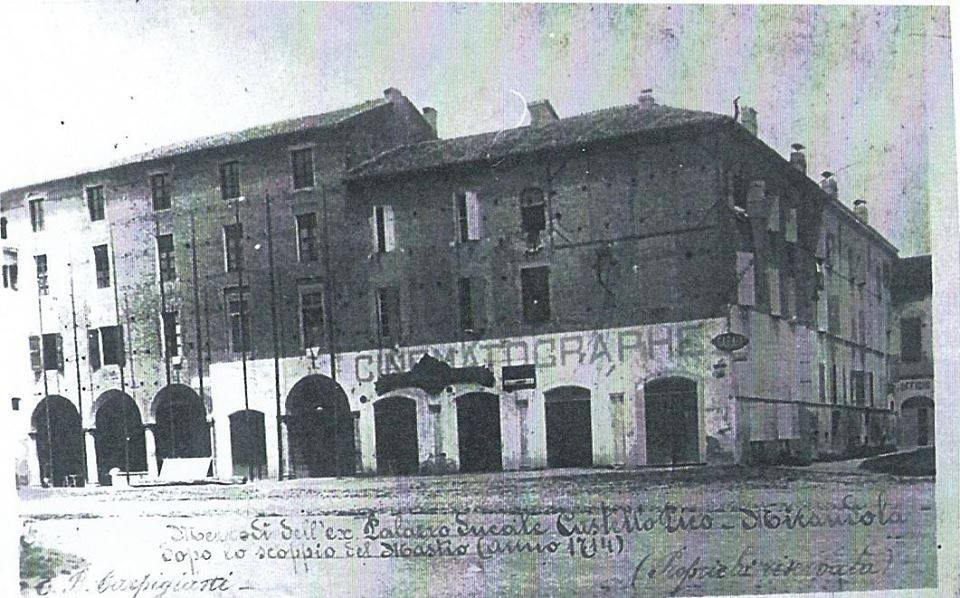
Ducal Palace of Mirandola, part of Pico castle (beginning of 20th century)

The largest surviving original structure of the castle of the Pico family is made up of the remains of the Duke's Palace, which overlooks the southern side of the castle, in front of the Teatro Nuovo. In the past, in this widening of the Costituente square, was organized the market of the horses. The facade is characterized by a noble portico resting on ten columns of pink marble, made on behalf of Alexander I Pico. From the portico, through an arched door profiled in ashlar, is the entrance to the inner courtyard and the "Galleria Nuova". On the western part the building there are the remains of the sixteenth-century "bastion of the castle", reinforced in 1576 by Fulvia da Correggio and connected to the mighty walls with a starry plan with 8 points that defended the city.

The Carabini Hall, located on the first floor of the ducal palace and decorated in a 17th-century style, hosted the Civic Museum.

=== Prisons ===
From the ground floor, descending a few steps, there are the prisons, made of thick masonry with a barrel vault, on whose thick walls are visible graffiti and drawings made by prisoners. Next to the prisons, another exhibition space was created for temporary exhibitions.

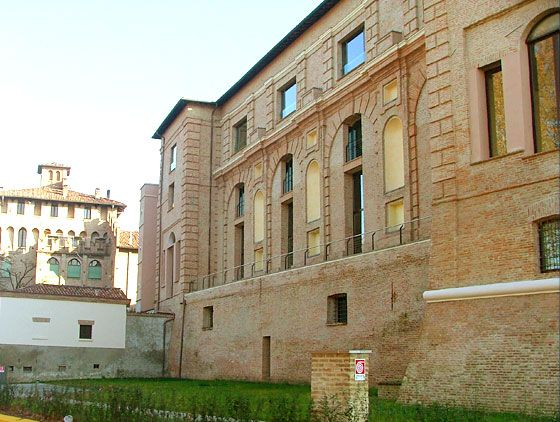
The northern facade of the Galleria Nuova, immediately after its restoration in 2006. In the background the massive keep rebuilt in the 20th century

=== Galleria Nuova ===
The central body of the castle consists of the "Galleria Nuova" (New Gallery), whose northern façade was erected by the duke Alessandro II Pico della Mirandola in 1668. The New Gallery, which dominates from above the Circonvallazione boulevard, consists of a loggia, closed at the sides by two buildings, profiled in ashlar and with large serlian windows tripartite.

The New Gallery was frescoed by Biagio Falcieri and arranged to house a precious picture gallery composed of over 300 works of art by notable artists such Leonardo da Vinci, Raphael, Caravaggio, Titian, Paolo Veronese, and many others) purchased in November 1688 by duke Alessandro II Pico from the lawyer Giovan Pietro Curtoni of Verona (1600-1656) at the price of 15,000 Venetian ducats.

Many of these masterpieces were sold in Bologna by the last duke Francesco Maria II Pico to support himself during his exile, others were lost with the devastating explosion of the keep in 1714, while other works (including many portraits of Pico and the paintings of the cycles "Age of the World" and "History of Psyche" by Sante Peranda) were taken away in 1716 to the Ducal Palace of Mantua, where are still nowadays. Other pieces of art are at the Estense Gallery in Modena.

=== Keep ===
The keep, known as the Torrione, was an impressive tower designed by Giovanni Marco Canozi from Lendinara (son of Lorenzo Canozi) and was built in 1499-1500 during Giovanni Francesco II Pico.

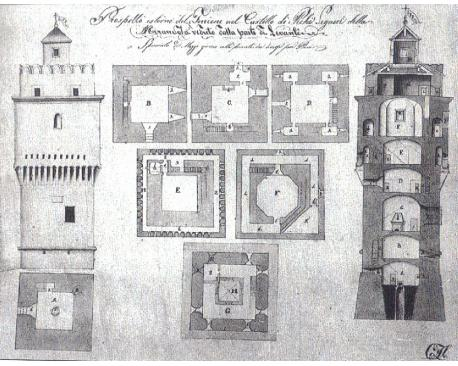
Map of Torrione, destroyed in 1714

The tower, which had walls 18 feet thick and was 48 meters high, was considered impregnable because it was completely detached and isolated from the castle: it could only be accessed through a drawbridge located on the third floor.

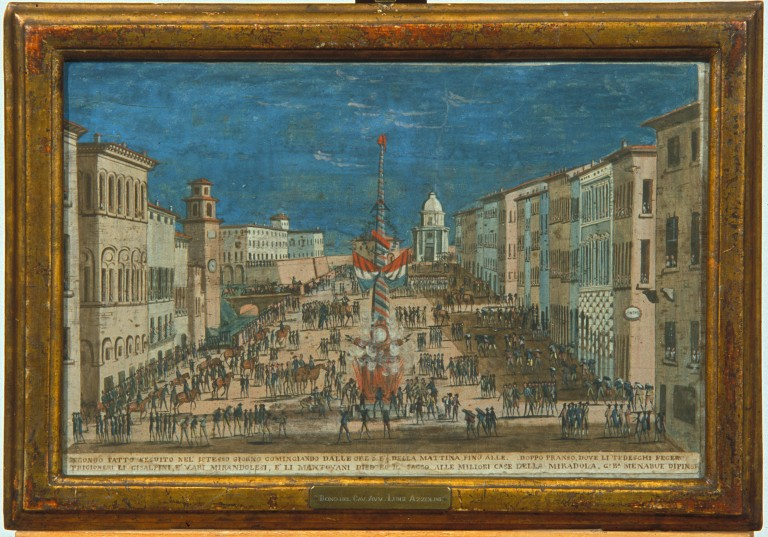
The main square of Mirandola 1799: the fortifications of the castle and the clock tower are still visible on the left.

On the night of June 11, 1714, during a thunderstorm that broke out around 1:30, lightning struck the roof of the tower, causing the powder magazine in which 270 barrels of gunpowder were kept to deflate. The shock wave caused very serious damage throughout the city and marked the beginning of the decline of Mirandola. The precious state archives of the Duchy of Mirandola were almost lost: a legend says that the inhabitants of Mirandola reused for months the ancient papers of the Pico family to wrap food.

In 1783, Ercole III d'Este, Duke of Modena ordered the further demolition of the Ducal Palace of Mirandola, the lowering of the starry walls of the city and the burying of the moats. Shortly afterwards all the other towers were demolished (except the Clock Tower in the main square) and some fortifications outside the walls. Other demolitions of the city walls took place during the Napoleonic era, while the definitive disappearance of all fortifications (walls and ramparts) dates back to the period from 1876 to 1896 as a decision of the municipal administration to combat unemployment: the land freed, the medieval historical finds found and the resulting material were all sold.

=== Square Tower ===
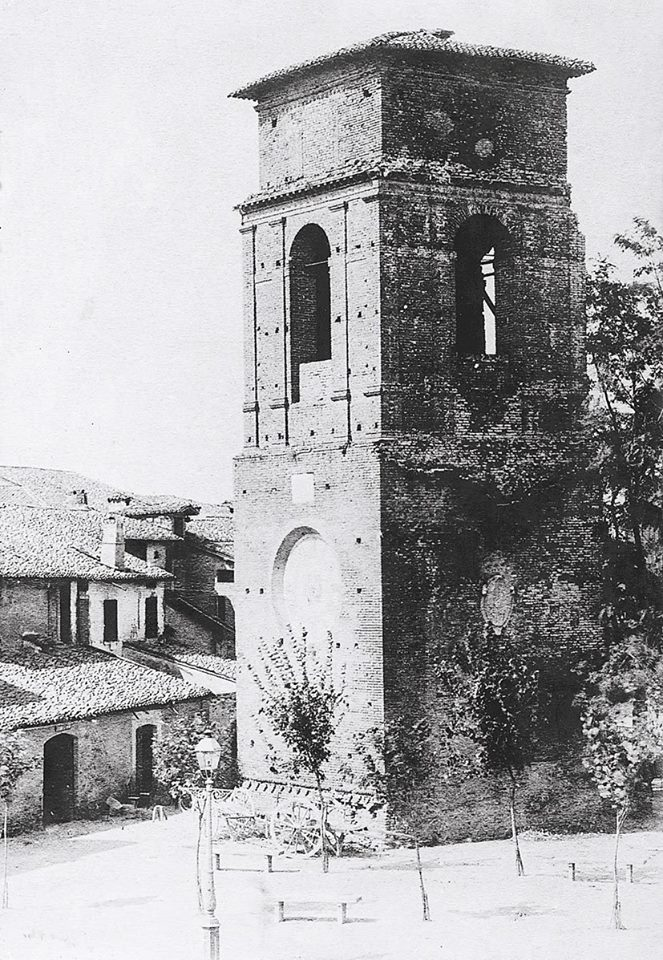
The Clock Tower, demolished in 1888

The Square Tower (Torre di Piazza), later called Tower of the Hours (Torre delle Ore) or Clock Tower (Torre dell'Orologio), was located at the extreme north-east point of the castle and directly overlooked today's Costituente Square, next to the Teatro Nuovo at the corner with Giovanni Tabacchi street, i.e. at the exact point where the newspaper kiosk (now converted into an exhibition window) was located. In 1837 the mayor of Mirandola, Count Felice Ceccopieri, had the clock transferred from the tower to the Town hall of Mirandola. The tower, the last remaining survivor of the Mirandola fortress, was unexpectedly demolished in 1888, as it was considered a place of decay.

Before the 2012 earthquake, the municipal administration planned to reconstruct "in a current key" the historically documented and no longer existing building volume of the tower, which will be a reference for the revival of the historic core of the city and for the "renewed civic sense of places and details".

=== Teatro Greco ===
In 1789 Count Ottavio Greco Corbelli asked and obtained from Duke Ercole III d'Este to set up a modern theatre inside the castle of Mirandola, where the militias of the Duchy of Modena were housed at the time.

For this theatre, based on a project by the architect Giuseppe Maria Soli, two halls were adapted, creating a room decorated with three tiers of boxes and with horseshoe-shaped cavea. Great scenic apparatus were also prepared, as required by the theatrical tradition of the late eighteenth century. The Greco Corbelli Theatre, officially inaugurated on September 29, 1791, fell into decline in the last two decades of the 19th century until its complete closure in 1894.

However, the local chronicles record an extraordinary film projection made on October 31, 1896 (the first in Italy ever, just a year after the first experiments of the Lumiere brothers) by the inventor-photographer from Mirandola Italo Pacchioni (who was born inside the castle in 1872), considered a pioneer of Italian cinema. More recently, inside the former Greco theatre, the Pico Cinema was set up, closed at the end of the 1980s.

== Exhibitions ==
=== Civic museum ===
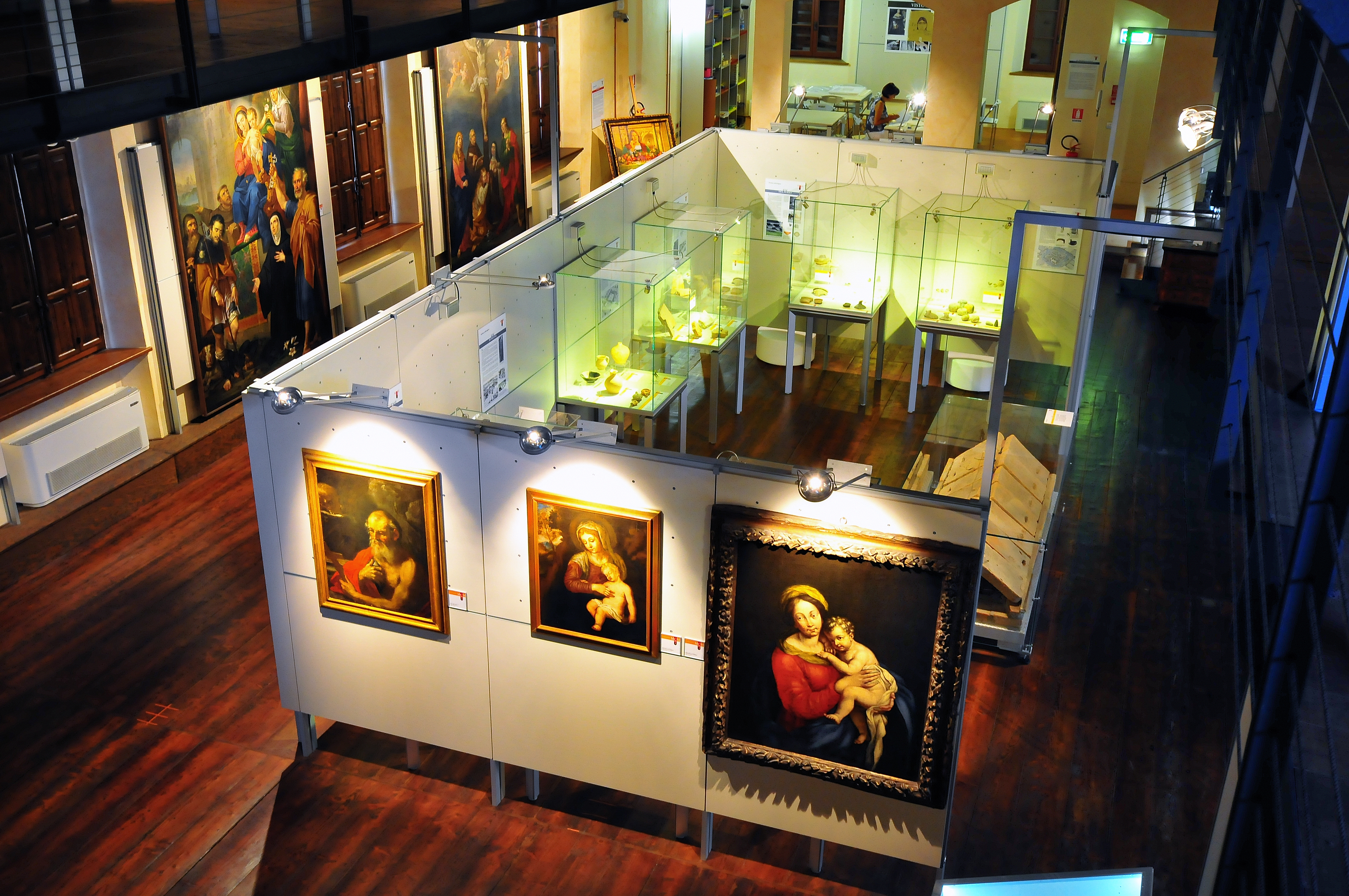
Civic museum before the 2012 earthquake

In 2006, following the reopening of the Pico castle to the public, the Civic Museum of Mirandola (before housed at the municipal library "Eugenio Garin", located first in Giuseppe Garibaldi square and then in the former Jesuit convent in Francesco Montanari street) was rebuilt and divided into 12 rooms, dedicated to archaeological items found in Mirandola, religious commissions, antique furniture and paintings (including a fine Madonna and Child attributed to Guercino), numismatics (coins of the mint of Mirandola and medals of Pisanello and Niccolò Fiorentino).

Other sections of the museum were dedicated to the Pico family and to the princes of the House of Este, with ancient portraits including a precious portrait of Alfonso IV d'Este by Justus Sustermans and a portrait of Alessandro I Pico by Sante Peranda.

A specific room was dedicated to the famous Giovanni Pico della Mirandola, important humanist philosopher from the Rennassance, and to his nephew Giovanni Francesco II Pico, man of letters.

In the last part of the museum were exhibited numerous portraits of politicians and writers of the 19th century, as well as a section dedicated to music and the local municipal orchestra.

The museum was also enriched by prints from the sixteenth to the twentieth century, various goods from the ancient Mount of Piety of the Franciscan monks and a collection of military relics (weapons, shields and armor of the fifteenth and sixteenth centuries).

=== Biomedical museum ===
Since 2010, the castle permanently hosted the traveling exhibition "Mobilmed", which shows the history of the Mirandola Biomedical District, a great source of income in the Mirandola area. However, following the serious damage caused by the earthquake of 2012, the exhibition was moved to Odoardo Focherini street.

=== Cassa di risparmio di Mirandola Foundation ===
On the top floor of the castle was the headquarters of the Fondazione Cassa di Risparmio di Mirandola, whose premises housed a rich collection of prints and historical maps of the city of Mirandola (part of the Giulio Cesare Costantini fund) and ancient weapons of the Duchy of Mirandola.

=== Leica Hall ===
Also on the top floor was the Leica Hall, where the Mirandola Photographic Society set up frequent exhibitions of artistic photographs, taken by professionals and fan of photography and Leica cameras.

== See also ==
- Duchy of Mirandola
- Mirandola
- Giovanni Pico della Mirandola

== Bibliography ==
- AA.VV. (2005). Il castello dei Pico: contributi allo studio delle trasformazioni del Castello di Mirandola dal XIV al XIX secolo. Gruppo studi Bassa modenese - Fondazione Cass di risparmio di Mirandola.
- Mauro Calzolari (2008). Il castello dei Pico: inventari di arredi, quadri e armi (1469-1714). Gruppo studi Bassa modenese - Fondazione Cass di risparmio di Mirandola.
- Marina Longo; Nicola Michelassi (2001). Teatro e spettacolo nella Mirandola dei Pico: 1468-1711. Olschki.
- Angelo Spaggiari (ed.). L'archivio del torrione: La memoria dispersa dei Pico. Fondazione Cass di risparmio di Mirandola.
