= Filippo Zaniberti =

Italian painter (1585–1636)

Filippo Zaniberti (1585–1636) was an Italian painter of the late Mannerist period.

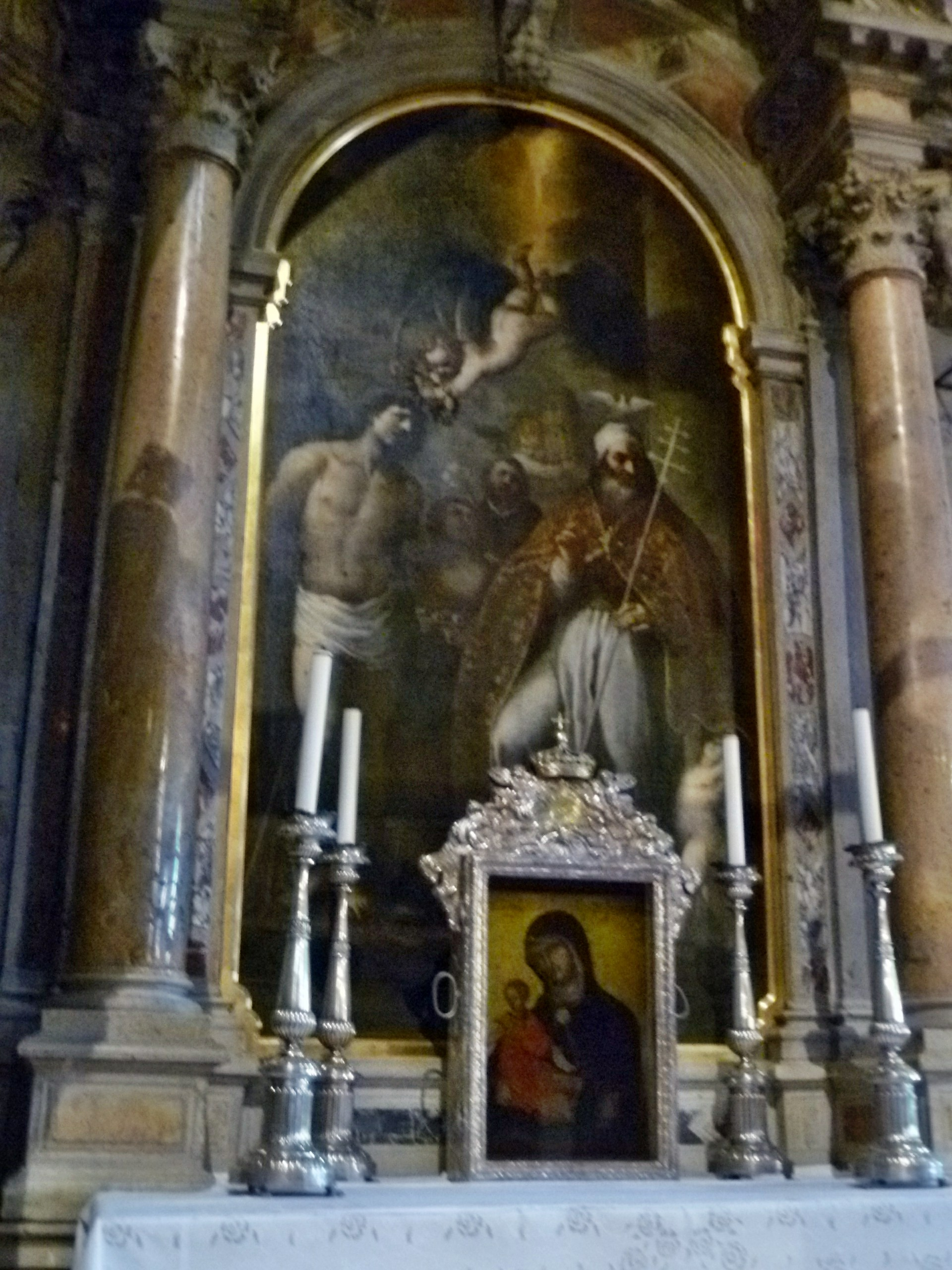
Baroque altar of St. Fabian and St. Sebastian, Cathedral of St. Jacob in Šibenik, Croatia

== Biography ==
He was born in Brescia and active in Venice, where he became a pupil of Santo Peranda. Zaniberti's style recalls the richness of Paolo Veronese. He painted a Mannah in the desert for the main altarpiece of the church of Santa Maria Nuova of Venice.

He worked alongside the fellow Peranda disciple, Matteo Ponzone, in the decoration of the Ducal palace of Mirandola. He painted a Marriage of St Catherine for the church of San Carlo of Brescia, a St Peter in Chains for the church of San Faustino Maggiore, The Grace found in the National Gallery of London, Rinaldo and Armida for the Art Gallery of Monaco, and an altarpiece for the Duomo of Sebenico (now Šibenik, Croatia). For the Sanctuary of the Madonna delle Grazie in Cordovado, he painted various panels for the ceiling of the apse, depicting Apparition of the Virgin to an infirm man; Apparition of the Virgin to a Monk painting an icon; Miracle of the Virgin of the Snows at the founding of the Basilica of Santa Maria Maggiore; and Apparition of the Virgin during a battle.
