= Civic Museum of Mirandola =

- Museo civico di Mirandola
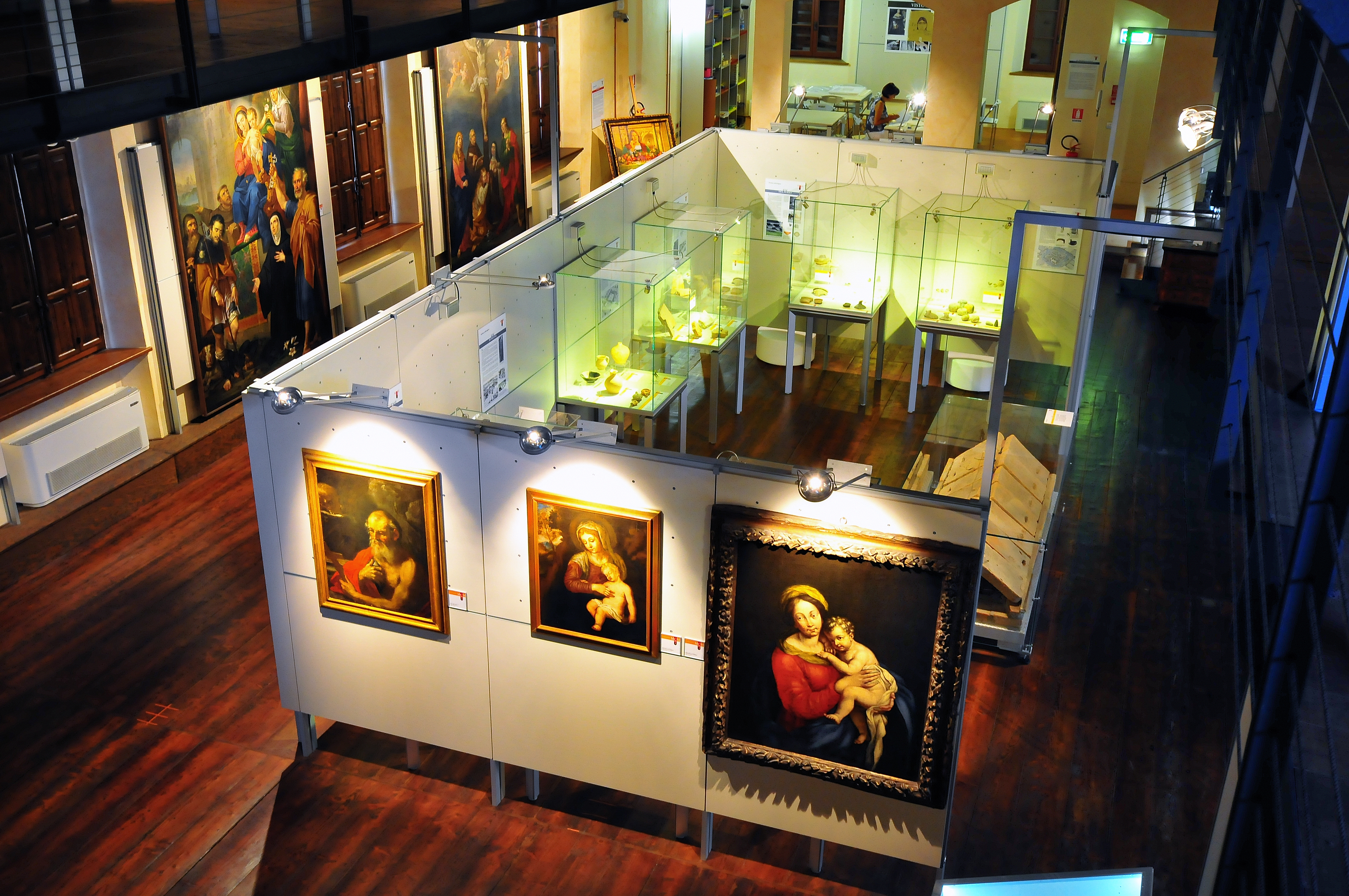
- Established: 1963
- Location: Castle of the Pico, Mirandola
- Type: local museum
- Owner: Municipality of Mirandola

The Civic Museum of Mirandola is a museum housed in the castle of the Pico in Mirandola, in the province of Modena, Italy, dedicated to the archaeology of the territory, religious commissions, ancient furnishings and paintings, coins and medals of the ancient mint of Mirandola. The museum is also enriched by maps from the 16th to the 20th century, various items from the ancient Mount of Piety of the Franciscan friars and a collection of military relics (weapons, shields and armor of the 15th and 16th centuries).

After being housed on the second floor of the Cultural Centre at the former Jesuit convent, the civic museum was rebuilt in November 2008 at the castle of the Pico.

The museum is currently closed due to unusability following the serious damage caused by the 2012 Northern Italy earthquake and its collection has been temporarily moved to the Ducal Palace of Sassuolo.

== History ==
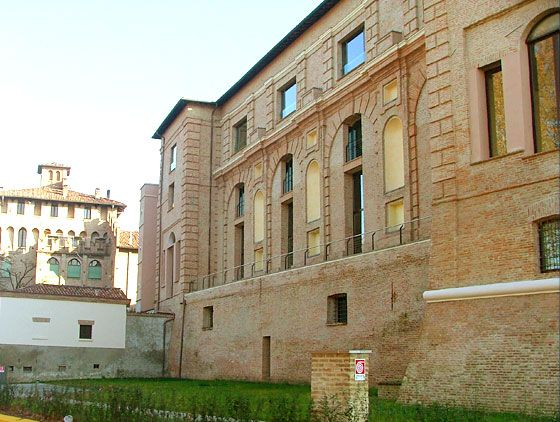
The New Gallery in the castle of the Pico, built by Alessandro II Pico to house precious work of art

In 1668, during the period of greatest splendour of the Duchy of Mirandola, Duke Alessandro II Pico order to build the Galleria Nuova (New Gallery) in the centre of the castle of the Pico, frescoed by Biagio Falcieri and arranged to house the precious picture gallery composed of over 300 works of art by extraordinary artists such as Leonardo da Vinci, Raphael, Caravaggio, Titian, and many others, purchased in Verona in 1688. Many of these masterpieces were lost with the devastating burst of the keep in 1714, while other works (including many portraits of the Pico family and paintings from the World Age and History of Psyche cycles by Sante Peranda) were taken away to the Ducal Palace of Mantua, where they are still found; other works are on display at the Galleria Estense in Modena.

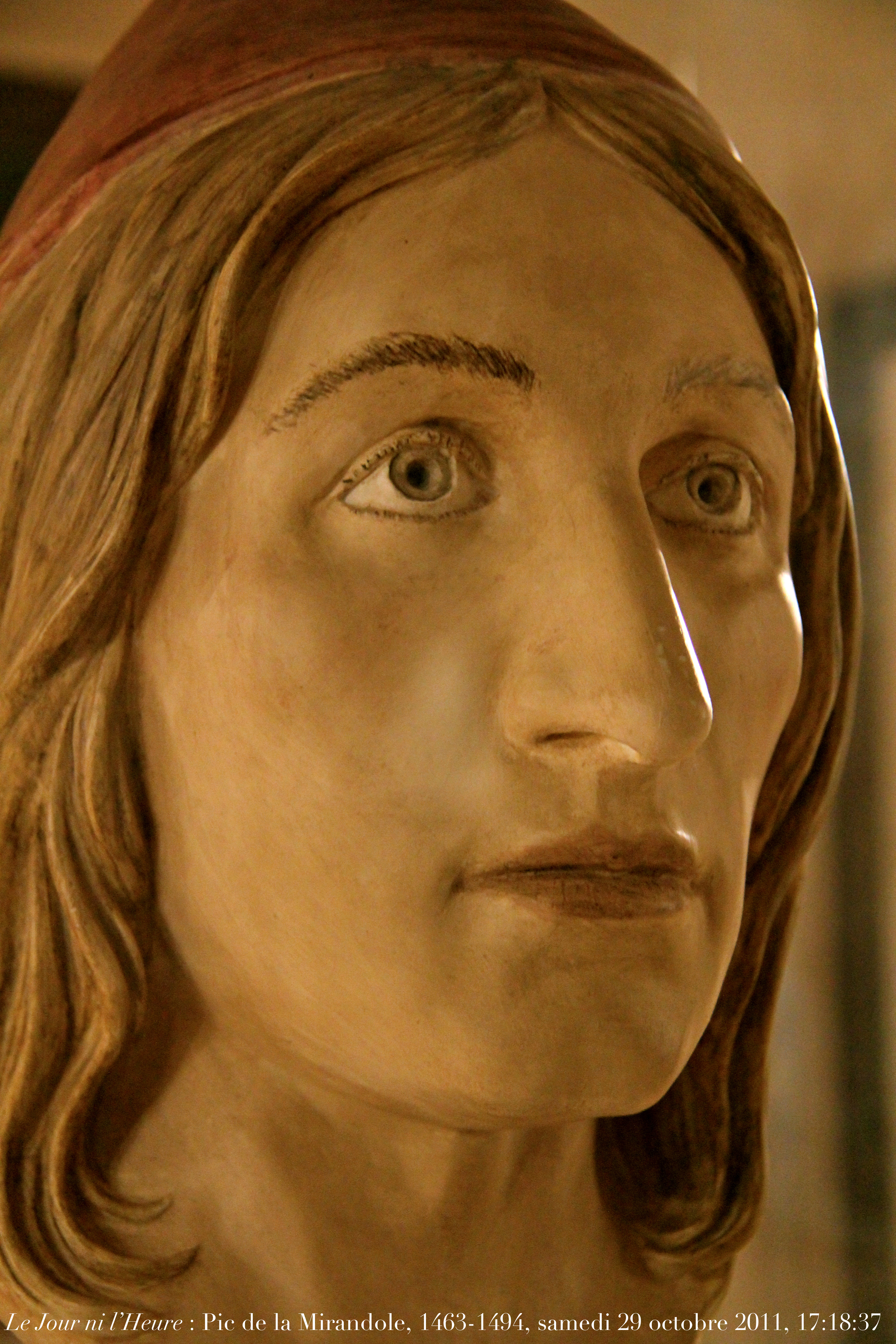
The face of Giovanni Pico della Mirandola reconstructed with scientific method, based on the original skeleton of the philosopher buried in Florence

The modern Civic Museum was founded in 1963, after the exhibition organized on the occasion of the 500th anniversary of the birth of famous Renaissance philosopher Giovanni Pico della Mirandola, when for the first time they brought together many works of art and memorabilia previously split in various municipal offices or abandoned in the municipal warehouse and historical archive. The first part of the exhibition concerned the iconography of the Pico princes from the 15th to the 18th century and of the Este dukes who came into possession of Mirandola after 1710 (35 paintings and three sculptures), as well as some altarpieces from the churches of Mirandola. The second part was related to the mint of Mirandola and the medal of the court of the Pico.

The museum was annexed to the city library, at the time located in the former Franciscan college in Giuseppe Garibaldi square; in 1983 the entire cultural-museum system was transferred to the former Jesuit college in Francesco Montanari street. In November 2008, following the recovery of the castle of the Pico, the civic museum was rebuilt and reorganized into the current seat of the castle.

On February 25, 2012, the Civic Museum of Mirandola was awarded by the Institute for Cultural and Natural Artistic Heritage of the Emilia-Romagna Region as "quality museum" for its "ability to adapt with sensitivity to the needs of users and to live as an open, dialoguing and constantly evolving institution".». Only few months later, on May 20, 2012, a violent earthquake severely damaged all the castle, making the Civic Museum unusable, which since then has been closed waiting to be recovered. The entire cartographic collection and gold coins have been temporarily transferred to the bank vault of the Unicredit in Modena, while the picture gallery is temporarily housed in the Ducal Palace of Sassuolo.

== Exhibition ==
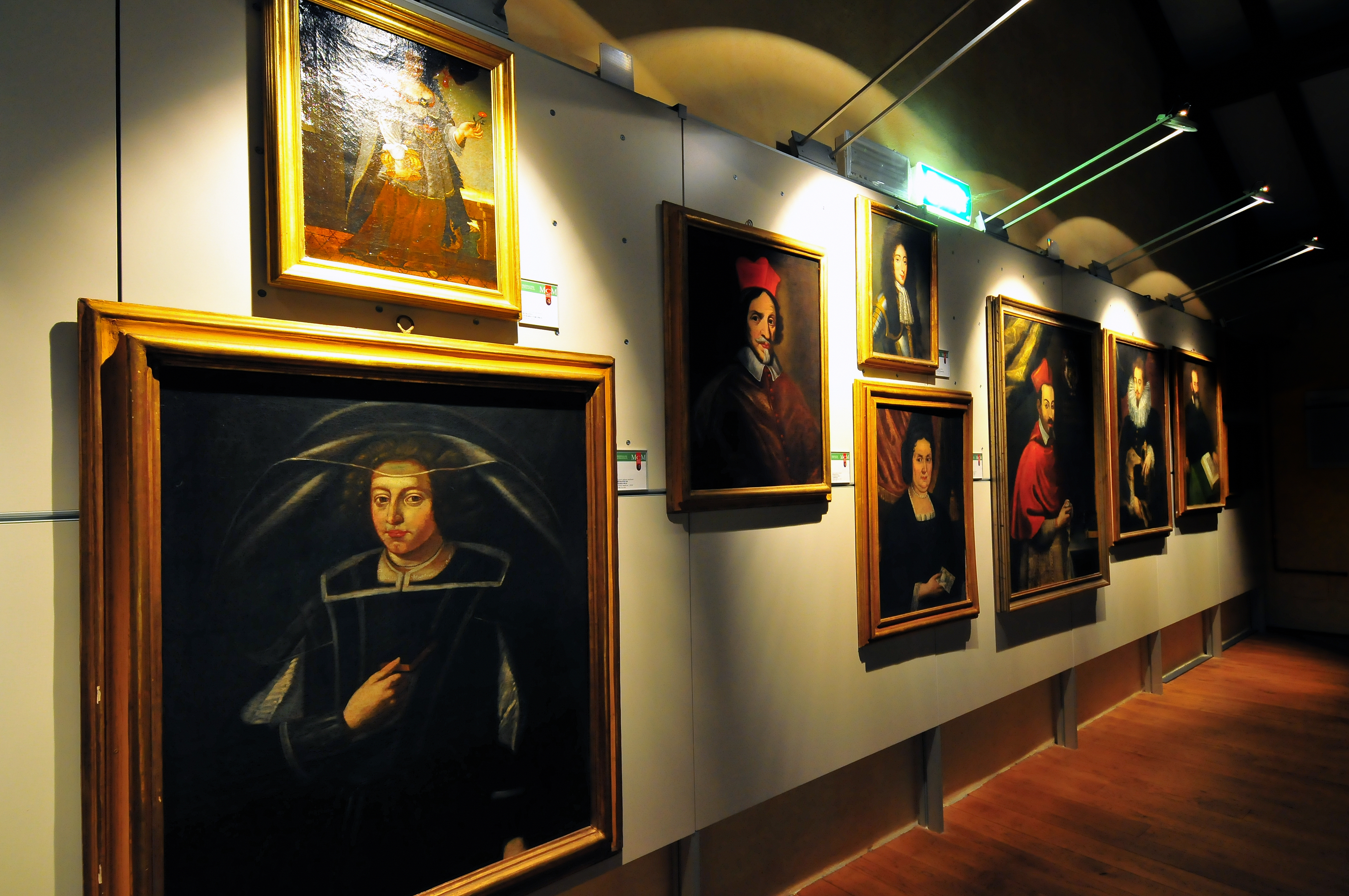
Painting collection

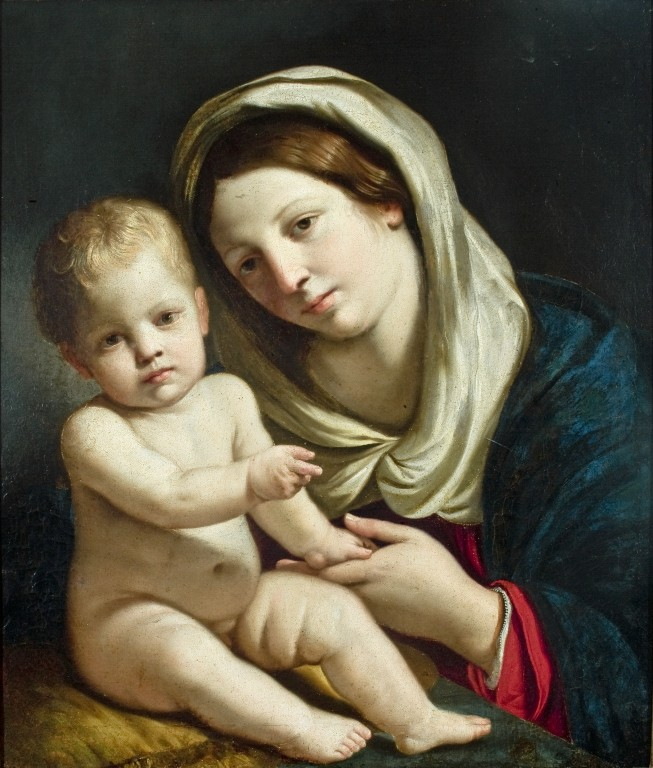
Madonna with child (attributed to Guercino)

The collections of the Civic Museum of Mirandola are divided into 12 sections, which is flanked by a space for museum education

1. Archaeology;
2. Religious commissions;
3. The Rosselli legacy;
4. The numismatics: coins, medals and the mint of the Pico;
5. Mirandola and the Pico. The lordship, the court, the city until the beginning of the XVIII century;
6. The illustrious kinship: the princes of Casa d'Este;
7. In Mirandola after the Pico: portraits between the 18th and 19th centuries;
8. Giovanni Pico della Mirandola and Giovan Francesco Pico;
9. The hall of music;
10. The Constantini legacy;
11. In the sacred fences of the credit: the Mount of Pity of Mirandola;
12. The craft of arms.
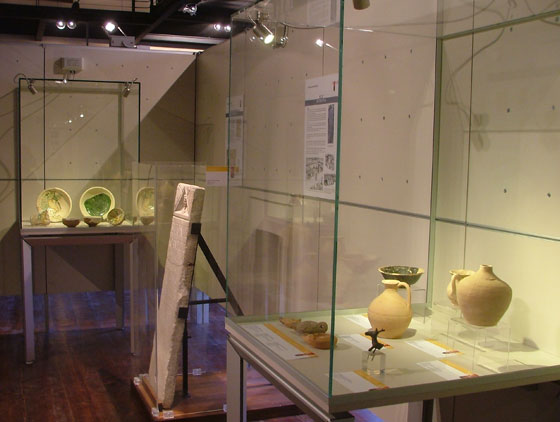
Archaeological section

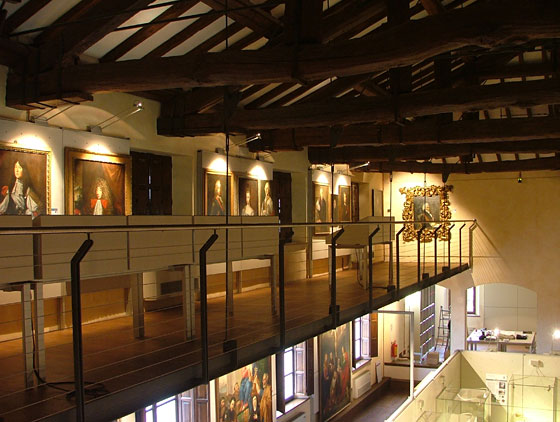
Pinacoteca

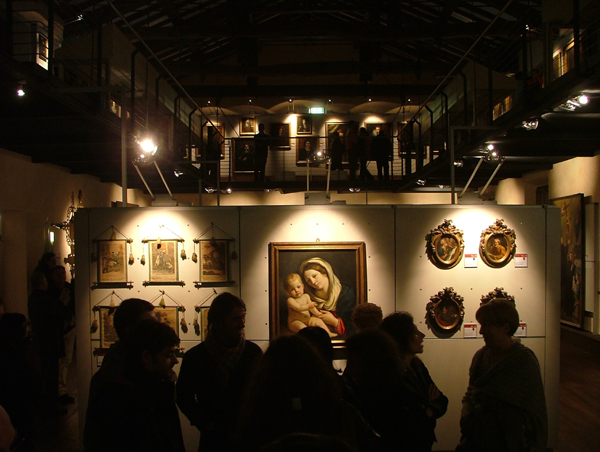
Works of Rosselli legacy

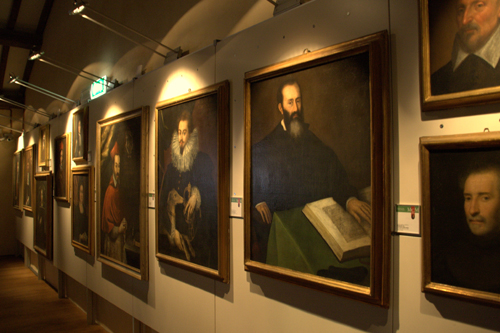
Portraits

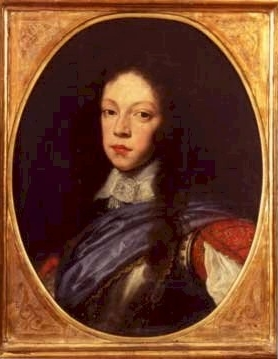
Justus Sustermans, Portrait of Alfonso IV d'Este (1650–1660)

The museum exhibits hundreds of paintings, coins, prints, furniture, documents and archaeological finds, which tell the story of Mirandola and its territory since pre-Roman times.

The large picture gallery includes paintings and portraits of various members of the Pico family (who ruled the city from 1311 to 1711), including works by Sante Peranda (a follower of Tintoretto), Justus Sustermans, Pietro Faccini, Pier Francesco Cittadini (known as the Milanese) and other court artists. Also on display are reliquaries, furnishings and paintings from churches in Mirandola, including a Madonna and Child attributed to Guercino.

The museum section dedicated to numismatics displays a rich collection of Roman coins and the mint of Mirandola (active between 1515 and the beginning of the 18th century), as well as numerous medals, including some made by Pisanello and Nicolò Fiorentino, the latter author of a well-known medal with the effigy of Giovanni Pico della Mirandola.

In the archaeological section there are numerous finds that document the human presence in the territory of Mirandola at least since the Bronze Age and the civilization of the Terramare, as well as in Roman times. Other exhibits include pottery, vases and majolica dating from the early Middle Ages to the Renaissance.

On the ground floor, next to the ancient prisons of the castle, there is a space for temporary exhibitions.

== See also ==
- Castle of the Pico
- Town hall of Mirandola
- Bergomi Palace
