= Biagio Falcieri =

Italian painter

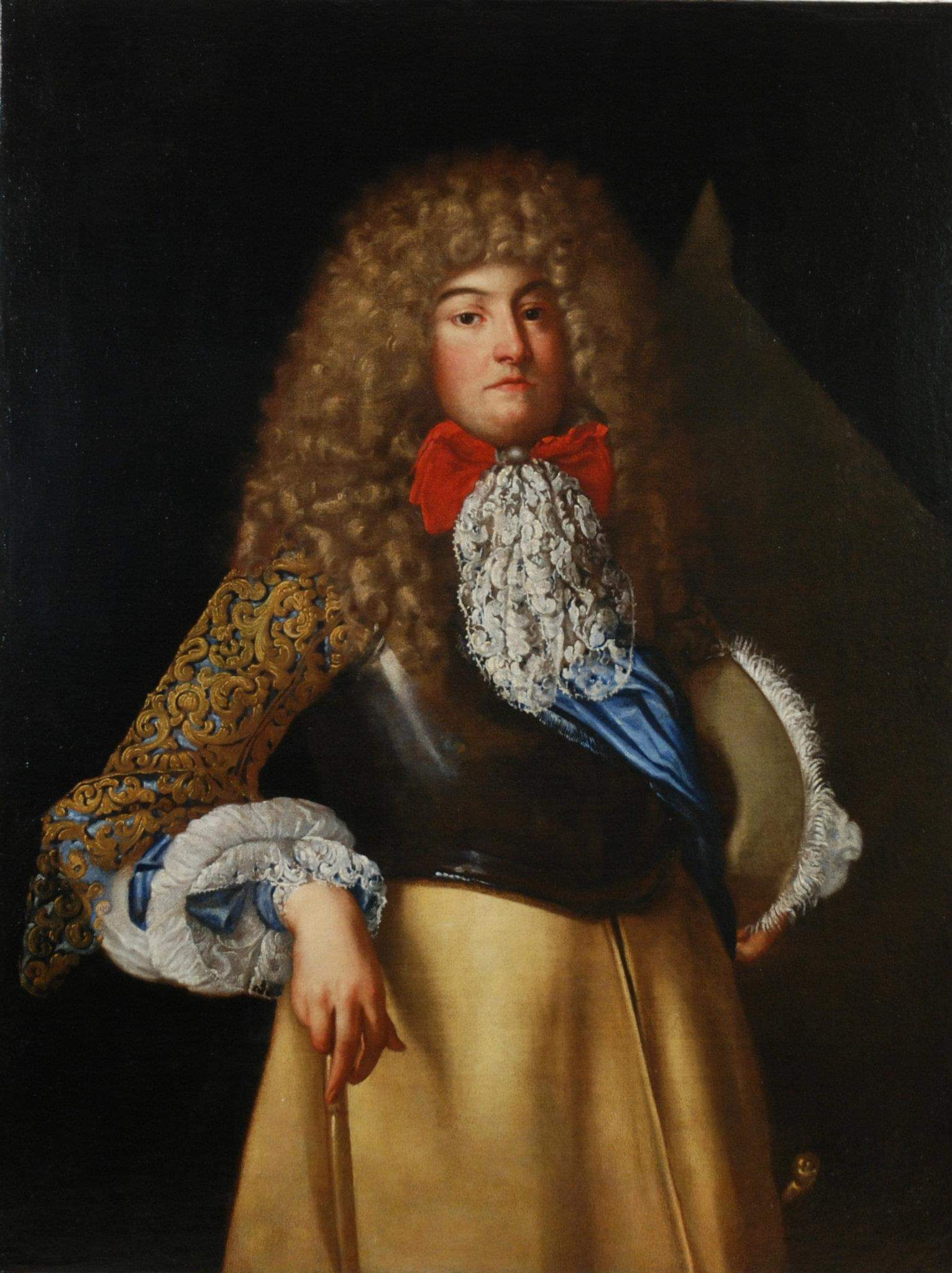
Portrait of Alessandro II Pico, c. 1680-1695, Civic Museum of Mirandola

Biagio Falcieri (17 July 1627 – 3 April 1703) was an Italian painter of the Baroque era active between Venice and Verona.

== Biography ==
Originally from Brentonico, near Trento, he studied with Pietro Liberi in Venice and returned to Verona. He painted a canvas about the Council of Trent behind the facade of the church of Sant'Anastasia, Verona. Although a Baroque painter, his provincial style has been described as a tired mannerism. He trained Andrea Voltolino, Alessandro Marchesini, Lorenzo Comendu, and Santi Prunati.
