= Italo Pacchioni =

Italian filmmaker (1872–1940)

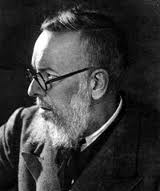
- Born: 29 March 1872; Mirandola, Emilia-Romagna; Italy
- Died: 11 July 1940 (aged 68); Milan, Lombardy; Italy
- Occupations: Inventor filmmaker
- Years active: 1896–1902

Italo Pacchioni (29 March 1872 – 11 July 1940) was an Italian inventor, photographer and filmmaker, pioneer of Italian cinema, inventor of a camera and projector inspired by the cinematograph of Auguste and Louis Lumière.

== Biography ==
=== Early life, career and legacies ===
Italo Pacchioni was born on 29 March 1872, in Mirandola, Italy. In 1896, he witnessed the first public screenings of the Lumière brothers in Paris where he wrote down and memorized the detailed operation of the Lumière cinematograph. With the help of his brother Enrico and a mechanic whose surname is only known, Veronelli, he assembled a camera and projector similar to the cinematograph of Auguste and Louis Lumière.

His first motion picture, Arrivo del treno nella stazione di Milano, was a straight parody of the Lumières, but it had the advantage of a far more stunning setting than the Lumières' La Ciotat. Subsequently, Pacchioni created three one-minute staged productions (La gabbia dei matti (The Madhouse), Battaglia di neve (Snow fight), and Il finto storpio (The Fake Cripple)), which he and his family performed in 1986. I funerali di Umberto I (1900), I funerali di Giuseppe Verdi (1901), La fiera di Porta Genova, Il vecchio verziere di Milano, Ginnasi della Mediolanum, and other actualities were also filmed by Pacchioni in the years that followed.

After the first screening performed on 31 October 1896 in Mirandola, Italo Pacchioni along with Rinaldi and Ronzoni, toured Italy with his invention and proposed 45-minute shows, unlike those of the Lumière which lasted no more than 25 minutes. The tour included 10, 15, at times even 20 films, depending on the amount of the paying audience. The sound consisted of improvised musical groups, there were no captions and, if necessary, the titles were shouted from the projection booth.

The pioneer abandoned all cinematographic activities in 1902. He then opened a photographic studio in Milan, and later opened two others, one in Busto Arsizio and one in Abbiategrasso.

=== Death ===
He died on 11 July 1940, in Milan, Italy. He was remembered and cited in the first cinema manuals.

== Filmography ==
Video of Il finto storpio al Castello Sforzesco ("The fake cripple at the Castello Sforzesco") by Italo Pacchioni (1896)

- 1896: Arrivo del treno alla Stazione di Milano
- 1896: Ballo in famiglia
- 1896: La battaglia di neve
- 1896: Le gabbie dei matti
- 1896: Il finto storpio al Castello Sforzesco
- 1898: La Fiera di Porta Genova
- 1898: Il vecchio Verziere
- 1898: I ginnasti della Mediolanum
- 1899: Il Re Umberto I in visita alla Marina
- 1900: I funerali di Umberto I
- 1901: I funerali di Giuseppe Verdi

== See also ==
- Cinema of Italy
- Lumière brothers
