= Sante Peranda =

Italian painter (1566-1638)

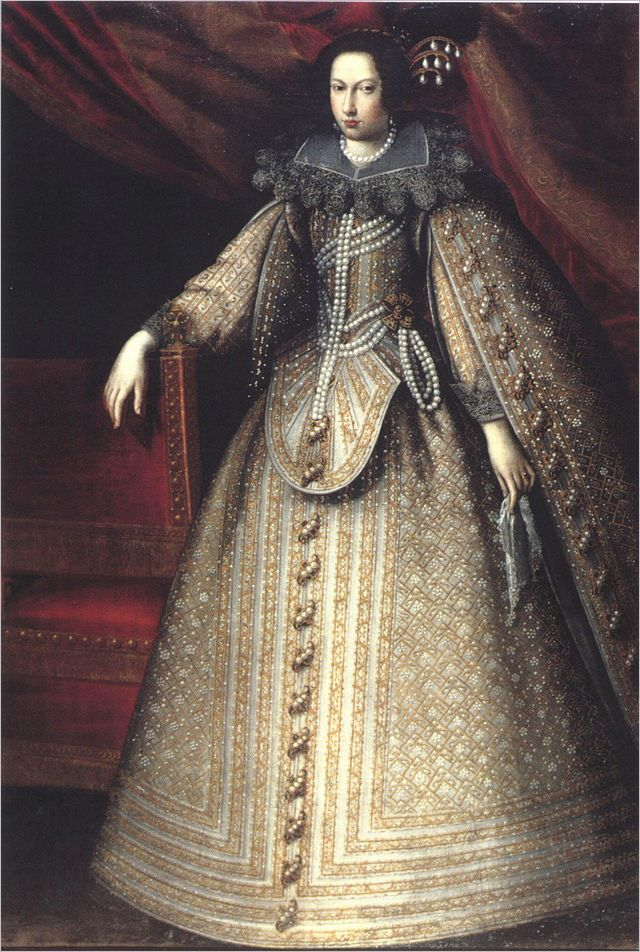
Sante Peranda, Portrait of Isabella of Savoy, Galleria Estense, Modena

Sante Peranda (1566–1638) was an Italian painter of the late-Renaissance period.

He was a pupil of the painter Leonardo Corona and later Palma il Giovane. Also known as Santo Peranda. He painted a Descent from the cross for San Procolo in Venice. He painted The defeat of the Saracens for the Ducal Palace of Modena. He painted the Gathering of the Manna for the church of the San Bartolome. In 1623 he finished Glorious Mysteries for the church of San Nicolò in Treviso. Among his pupils were Francesco Maffei, Matteo Ponzone, and Filippo Zaniberti.
