= San Francesco, Mirandola =

Church in Emilia-Romagna, Italy

Church of St. Francis
- Chiesa di San Francesco
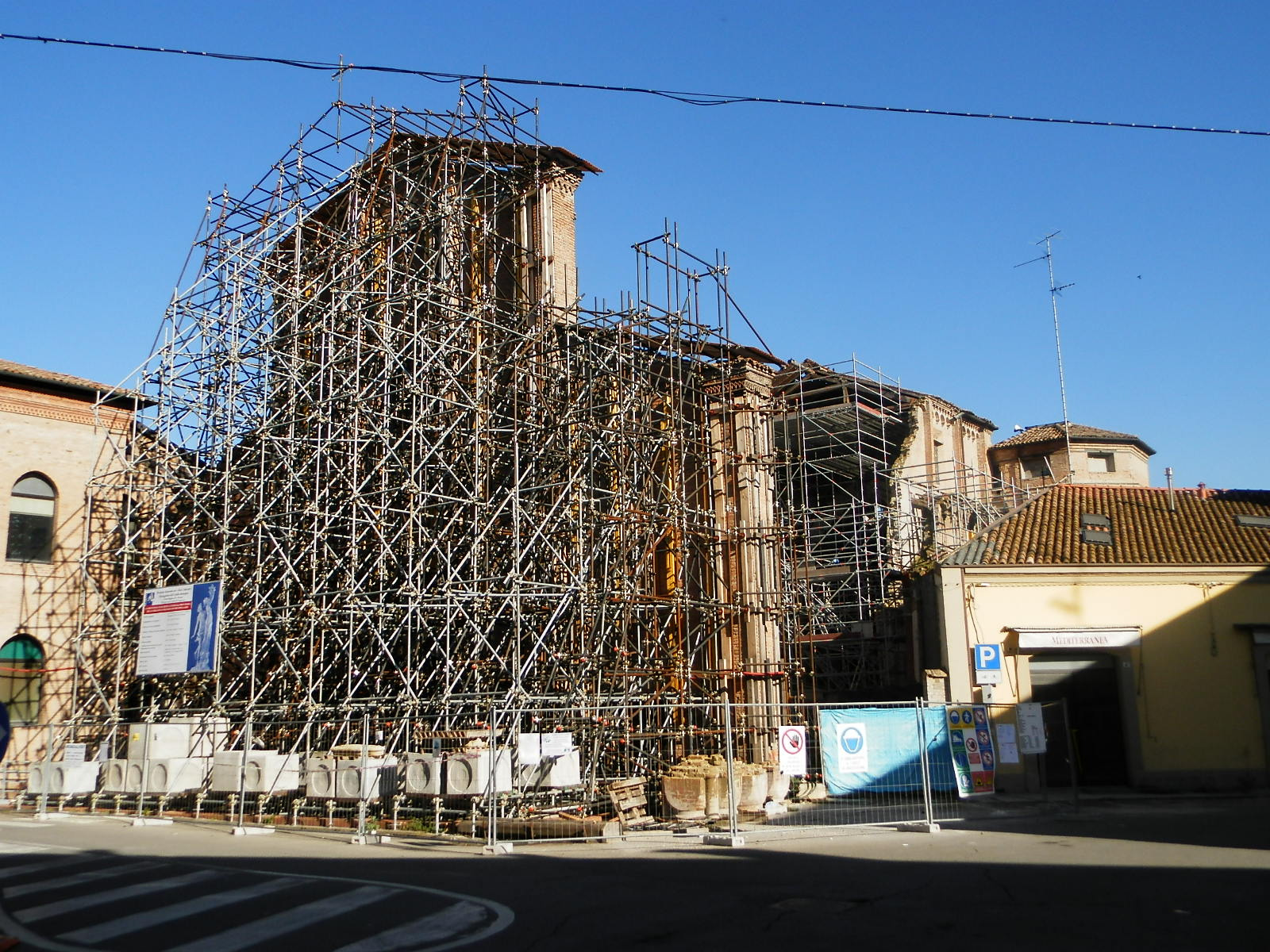
- The church after the 2012 earthquake

Religion
- Affiliation: Roman Catholic
- Province: Province of Modena
- Region: Emilia-Romagna
- Ecclesiastical or organisational status: church
- Patron: Francis of Assisi
- Year consecrated: 1286
- Status: abandoned

Location
- Municipality: Mirandola
- Country: Italy
- Interactive map of Church of St. Francis
- Coordinates: 44.887787°N 11.067859°E

Architecture
- Demolished: 2012

Specifications
- Direction of façade: West
- Elevation: 18 m (59 ft)

The church of San Francesco is a church located in Mirandola, in the province of Modena, Italy.

Almost completely destroyed by the 2012 Emilia earthquake, it was one of the first Franciscan churches built in Emilia by the Order of Friars Minor, constructed shortly after the canonisation of St. Francis of Assisi in 1228. Inside it was the ''Pantheon'' of the House of Pico della Mirandola.

== History ==
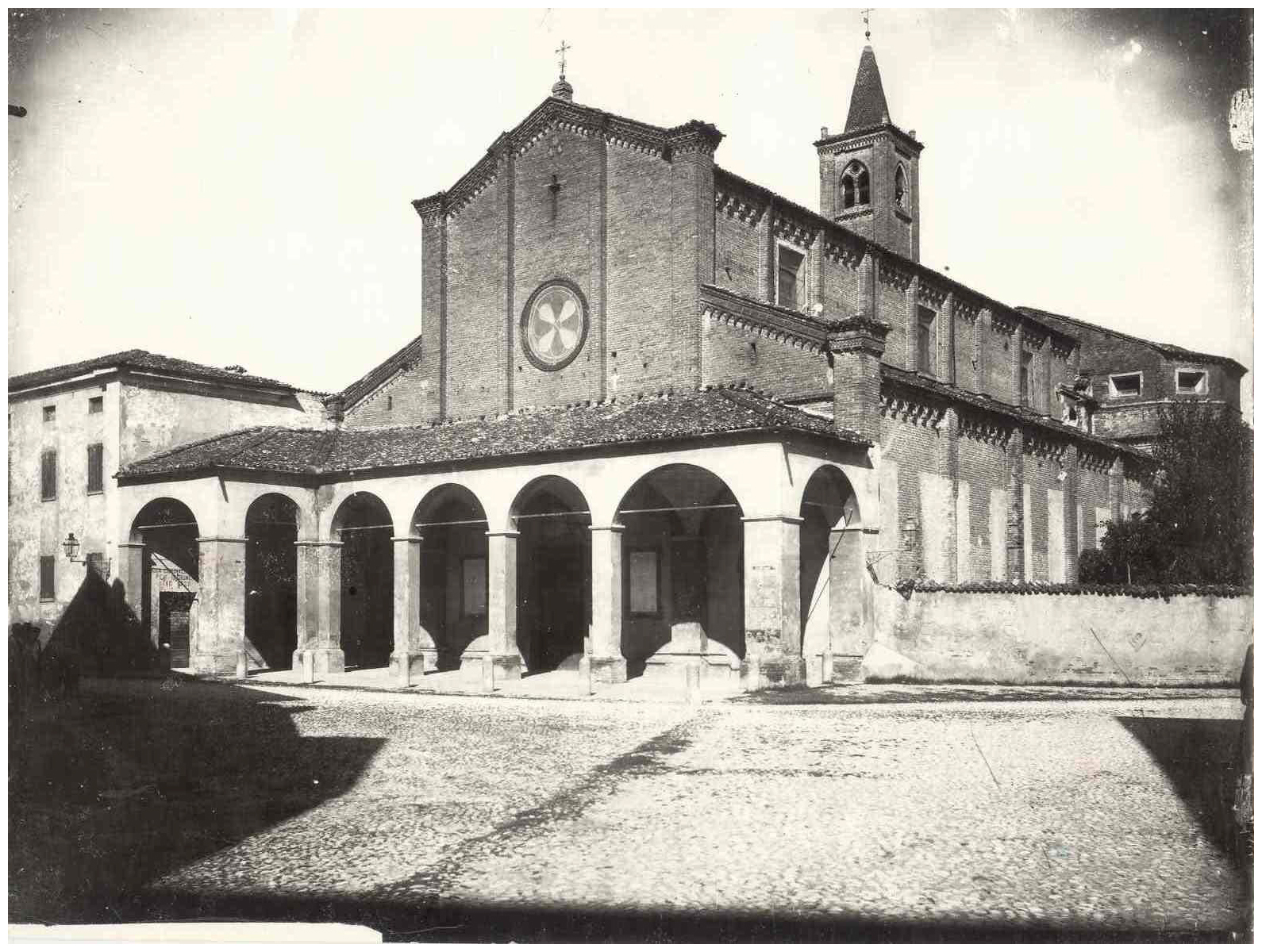
Exterior of the church with the portico (demolished in 1927)

=== Origins ===
Towards the first half of the 13th century, the Franciscan friars arrived in Mirandola from Bologna, where the first Franciscan settlement dates back to 1213, while the beginning of the construction of the Bolognese Basilica of St. Francis is recorded in the year 1236, after the visit of St. Francis of Assisi to Bologna in 1222.

The first building of the Mirandola complex, initially with a single nave, a gabled roof with two slopes and a quadrangular plan, dates back to 1286-1287, in the outer part of the defensive walls of Mirandola among the houses of Borgo di Sopra, later renamed Borgo San Francesco. At the time, the façade faced east and the apse towards the walls of the centre of Mirandola. Other records of the church date back to 1349, 1377, 1385, and 1392.

In 1390, a council of 13 judges met in the church of San Francesco to settle the dispute that had arisen over the dominion of Mirandola between the four brothers Spinetta, Francesco, Prendiparte and Tommasino (sons of Paolo Pico) against Giovanni and Prendiparte (sons of Nicolò Pico).

In 1400 the church was reconsecrated, after the reconstruction within the new walls ordered by Costanza Pico (daughter of Tommasino and wife of Stefanino Stefanini of Modena), enlarged to three naves in Gothic style. Later, the chapel dedicated to the Blessed Virgin of Reggio was built in Baroque style. A few years after the fall of the Pico family, their tombs were plundered.

In 1660, a five-arched exterior portico was built, connecting the façade to the adjacent monastery. Until its demolition in 1927, the Franciscan friars distributed soup or a hot meal and bread to the poor and wayfarers, including foreigners, under that portico. The institution of the "desco dei poveri" (known in Mirandola dialect as "al scaldatoi") dates back to 1485, while ten years later, to combat usury, the Sacro Monte di Pietà was founded (later incorporated into the Cassa di Risparmio di Mirandola in 1941), where the needy could pledge their possessions at little or no interest.

In 1714, the bursting of the keep of the Pico Castle caused serious damage to the church of San Francesco, as well as to all the buildings in the town centre. Further serious damage occurred in 1798-1799 during the French campaign in Italy, but the church managed to save itself from Napoleonic destruction (which also abolished ecclesiastical orders), as it was sold together with the Oratory of Santa Rosalia.

=== Contemporary age ===
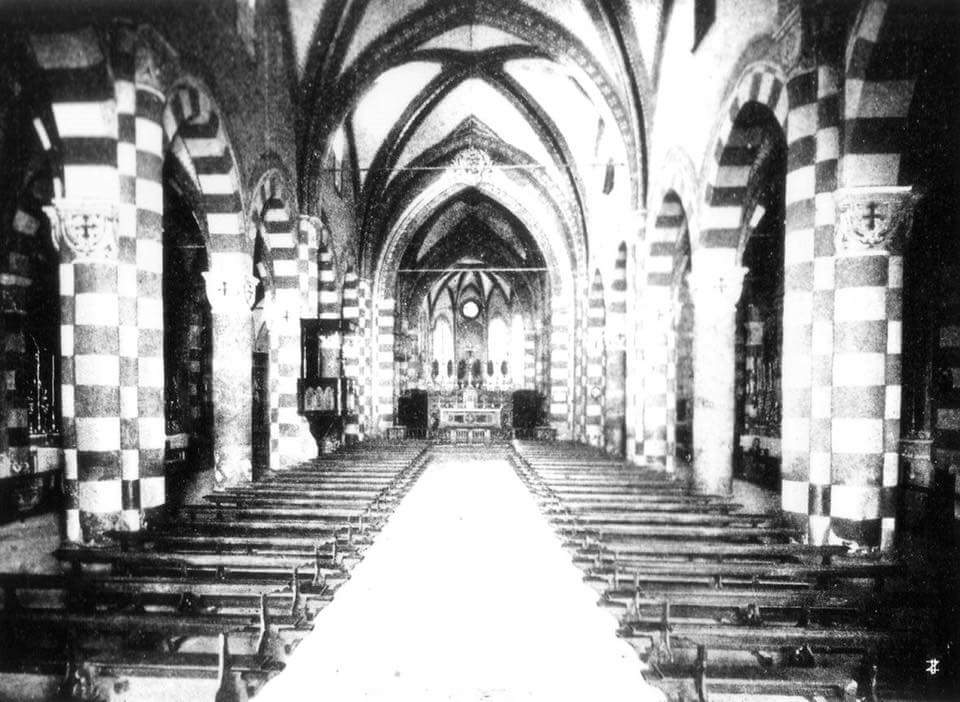
Interior of the church in 19th-century, before restoration during the Fascist era

After the destruction of the convent in 1812, a period of restoration began after two years with the advent of Francis IV, Duke of Modena, who, however, transferred to Modena in 1818 the very precious Crucifixion with Saints Jerome and Francis (known as the Altarpiece of the Three Crosses, today exhibited in the Galleria Estense), a 15th-century work by Francesco Bianchi Ferrari. In 1824 a monument was added dedicated to the famous Renaissance philosopher Giovanni Pico della Mirandola, who died in 1494 in Florence and buried there in the Convent of St. Mark. In 1833 the wooden high altar carved in 1745 by Francesco Salani della Mirandola was destroyed. In 1837, the windows on the southern wall were closed.

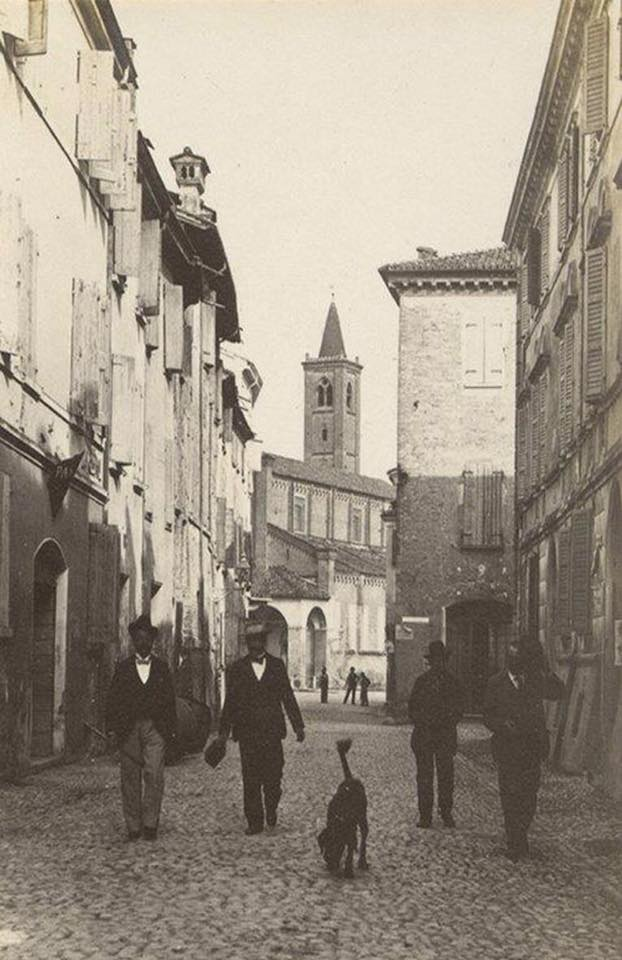
Church of San Francesco as seen from Volturno street at the beginning of 20th century

After 1848, the Franciscan monastery was also rebuilt. In 1866, the convent was requisitioned by the Kingdom of Italy, which handed it over to the municipality the following year. In 1870, the church was again restored: the interior was plastered with wide white and blue horizontal stripes in Gothic-Tuscan style and the side chapels were enriched with post-Baroque and Rococo decorations, with an altar in each bay

During World War I, the army requisitioned the church, which was closed from 1917 for many years.

During the Fascist period, a radical stylistic restoration was planned by the superintendency of Bologna and following the canons of Alfonso Rubbiani: in 1927 the external portico dating back to 1660, which housed the so-called "desco dei poveri" (the demolition was justified as indispensable due to the serious damage to the wall, which was not actually present), was demolished and restoration work began, which was completed in 1938, in an attempt to restore the church to its original appearance, i.e. prior to the 19th century renovations. In addition to the portico, the Baroque altars were removed and the windows on the south wall, which had been reduced to an almost square shape in 1642, were restored with stained glass windows. In addition, the marble floor was redone, but the Pico family's underground mass graves were lost (the crypt was already buried in 1922). In 1928-1930, a military shrine was built for soldiers who had fallen in the wars. The mullions on the southern and northern sides of the bell tower, which had been reduced to single-light windows in 1829, were also restored. In 1929, the windows of the south aisle were reopened and the floor was redone in marble.

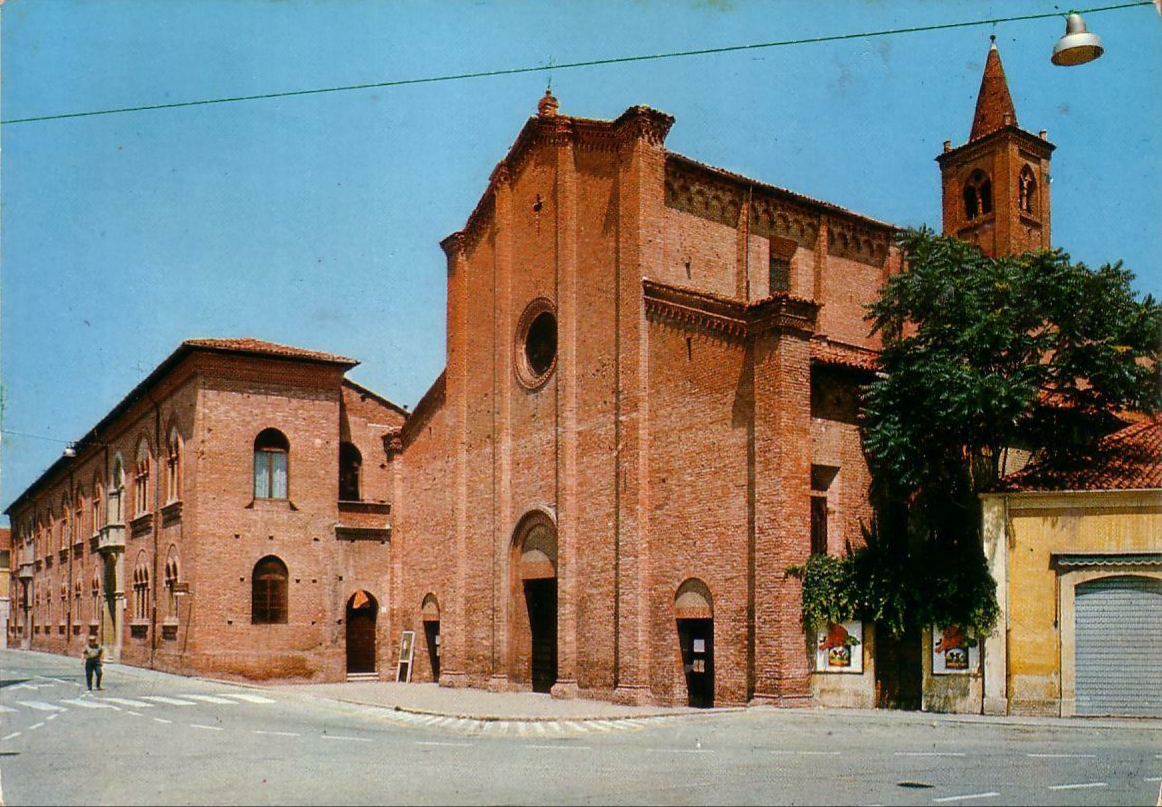
St. Francis in the 1970s

The adjacent Franciscan monastery housed the civic library (founded in 1868), the junior high school and the Liceum "Giovanni Pico" (founded in 1923): the façade on Giuseppe Garibaldi square was completely rebuilt in "mock-Gothic" style by Fascist architect Mario Guerzoni.

In 1994 the Franciscan friars left the church for good and in January 1997 it was entrusted by the bishop of Carpi Bassano Staffieri to don Luciano Ferrari, diocesan priest and chaplain of the Santa Maria Bianca Hospital in Mirandola; as rector, he was in charge of the church until, in view of his advanced age, the newly installed Bishop Elio Tinti decided to assign it to the Missionary Servants of the Poors as of 19 October 2001.

=== 2012 earthquake ===
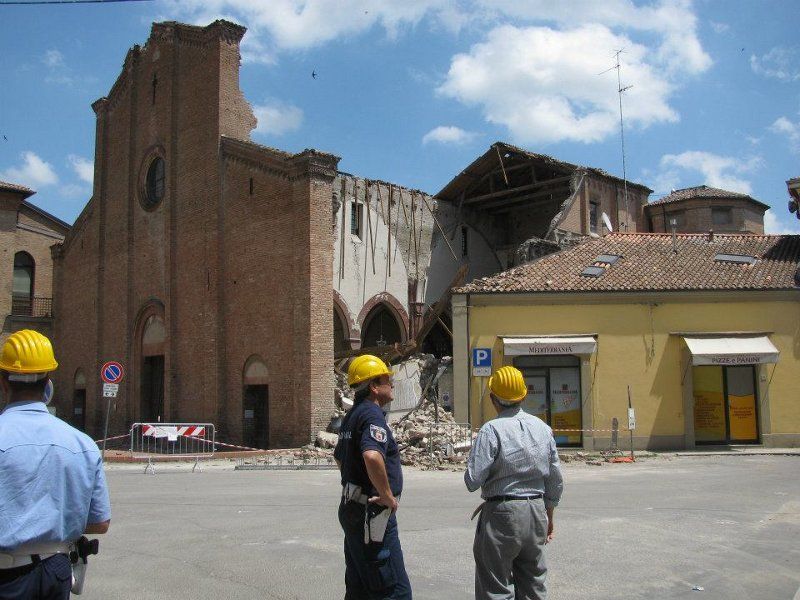
The church destroyed by the collapse of the bell tower after the 2012 earthquake

The San Francesco complex was severely damaged by the 2012 Emilia earthquake: the bell tower, which initially remained standing after the first tremor on 20 May, was damaged by the earthquake, subsequently collapsed during the second major seismic tremor on 29 May, fortunately without causing any casualties. The bell tower crashed down onto the church, almost completely destroying it, of which only the façade, the northern wall (where the Pico tombs are located) and the chapel of the military shrine in the opposite southern nave were saved. On 22 June, about a month after the first earthquake, the fire brigade began slinging and shoring up the surviving façade and the remains of the church.

The damage caused by the earthquake to the church of San Francesco amounts to 10 million euros.

== Architecture ==
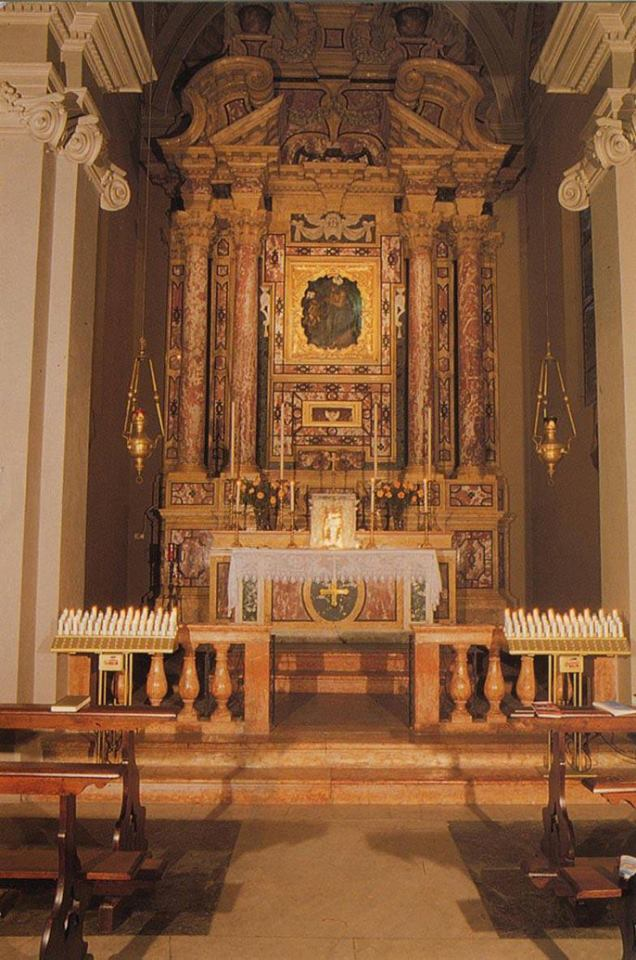
Chapel of Madonna della Ghiara

The external façade, in exposed red brick, was built in the 15th-century extension in a simple, austere and markedly geometric style. Lesene mark out the façade, characterised by a modest central rose window surmounted by a cross-shaped window, decorated at the top with crossed bricks and terracotta tiles.

The size of the building hints at its importance to the community: the interior of the church is 49.95 metres long by 21 metres wide, built in Gothic style, with a large central nave 10.42 metres wide (typical of mendicant orders), with ogival arches and brick-red ribs on white plaster that reached up to the ceiling (14.50 metres high). The nave reached the large octagonal apse, where the altar and choir were located. The naves were separated by 7.80 m high arcades supported by 5.10 m high columns.

At the end of the 5.02 m wide right-hand nave, already decorated with stained glass windows, is the military shrine chapel, dedicated to the fallen of all wars, which remained almost unscathed after the 2012 earthquake.

In the left aisle, 5.36 m wide, there was a painting of St Francis Receiving the Stigmata by Sante Peranda (recovered from the rubble of the 2012 earthquake by the fire brigade and currently transferred to Sassuolo) and a precious marble altar in the chapel of the Virgin of Reggio (Madonna della Ghiara).

== Pantheon of Pico family ==
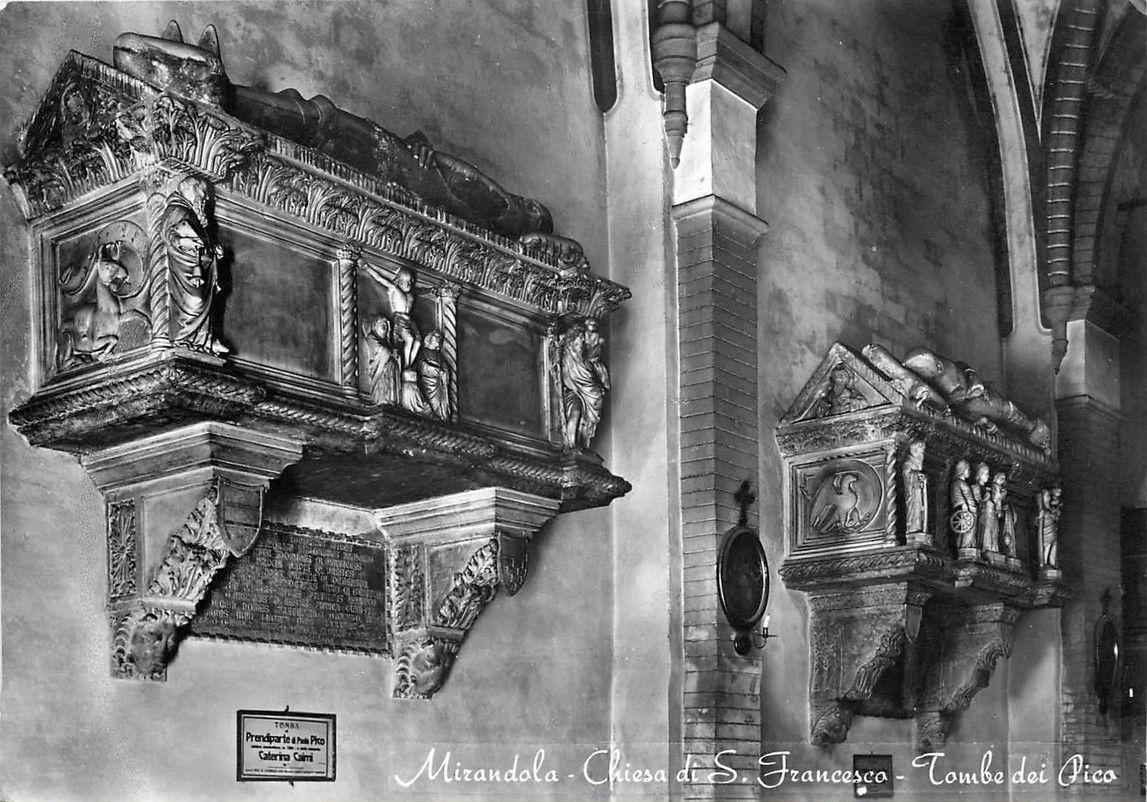
Pantheon of the Pico family in the 1950s. Left: Prendiparte Pico's tomb, a masterpiece by Paolo di Jacobello dalle Masegne (14th-15th century).

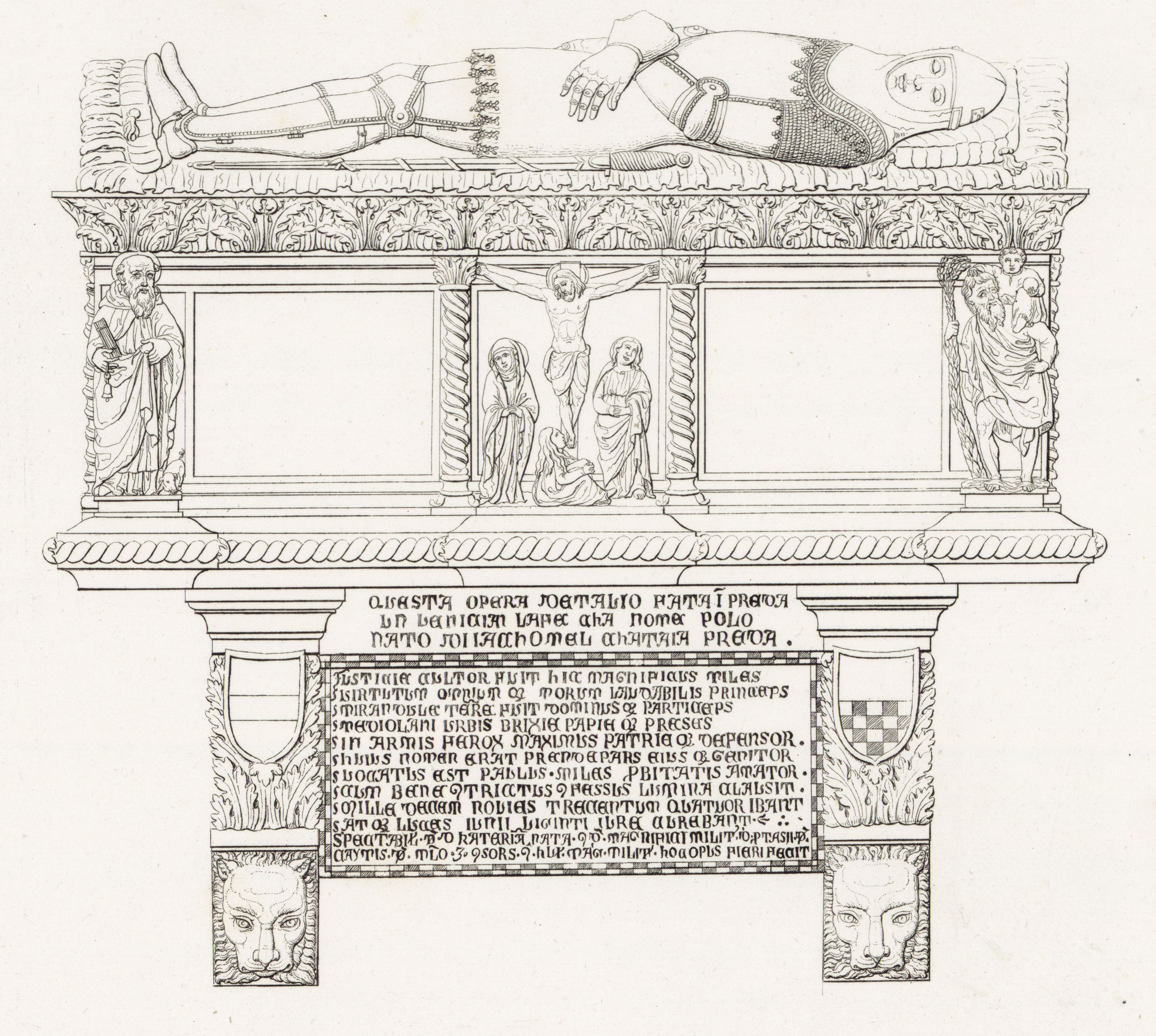
Tomb of Prendiparte Pico (front)

The most interesting part of the church was the so-called Pantheon of the Pico family, rulers of Mirandola and Concordia, located on the northern wall of the left aisle, consisting of a series of four suspended sarcophagi. From the entrance towards the back of the church:

- tomb of Galeotto I Pico (dead in 1499, brother of Giovanni Pico) and his wife Bianca d'Este, in simple Renaissance style, bears the coat of arms of the Pico della Mirandola-Concordia family, a resurrecting phoenix, a cross and the inscription "I had Bianca for my wife, who, grateful, gave me this tomb to serve both, a chaste soul and this memory";
- tomb of Prendiparte Pico (who died on 20 June 1394 and was initially buried in the crypt, Spinetta's brother) and Caterina Caimi: the latter, having seen the beauty of her brother-in-law Spinetta's tomb, did not want to be outdone and commissioned an even more beautiful work from the prestigious Venetian woodcarver Paolo dalle Masegne, son of the famous Jacobello The monument is one of the greatest masterpieces of Venetian Gothic in Emilia: the urn is carved from a single block of marble with the scene of the Crucifixion in the centre, flanked by the highly expressive figures of Mary, St John and Mary Magdalene screaming in pain; at the sides of the tomb a mule bent by the weight of a sack (representing the widow's unbearable grief) and a dog (symbol of loyalty) together with Old English inscriptions, testifying to the link between Prendiparte and John Hawkwood. The plaster lid is carved life-size in the image of the deceased on his deathbed wearing battle armour. Traces of gold and colour, typical of the Delle Masegne tombs, are still visible;
- tomb of Spinetta Pico (died 1399, brother of Prendiparte), made according to the detailed testamentary dispositions of the deceased: in the sarcophagus is a Madonna and Child flanked by the martyred saints Stephen and Catherine, as well as Saints Anthony Abbot and Christopher. On the marble lid of the urn is a life-size sculpture of the deceased asleep, dressed in battle armour.
- tomb of Gianfrancesco I Pico (dead in 1469) e Giulia Boiardo, parents of Giovanni Pico della Mirandola: commissioned by his nephew Gianfrancesco II, it is also a simple Renaissance work in the Tuscan style, with sculpted leaves surrounding the family shield..

All the tombs, looted over the centuries, are empty inside.

The church also contained a cenotaph of Giovanni Pico, made in 1824 by the sculptor Giuseppe Pisani. Initially placed in the chapel of the Blessed Virgin of Reggio, in 1922 it was moved to the wall of the right aisle, next to the tombs of the Pico family.

Francesco Pico together with his wife Pietra Pia and their children were also buried in the church in 1445 (the red marble tombstone from Verona, however, was removed in 1839 by the friars, its inscriptions abraded and divided into two pieces that were reused as the threshold of the side doors); in front of the altar of San Francesco Solano, Giovanni I Pico and his wife Caterina Bevilacqua d'Ala; on the left side of the choir there is a decorated plaque (ruined by French troops in 1798) in memory of Ippolito Pico, killed by the Huguenots in 1569, placed there by his brother Luigi Pico. Finally, on the opposite side of the choir, there are two other tombstones: one in black marble dedicated to Galeotto IV Pico (commissioned by his wife Maria Cybo-Malaspina) and the other in red marble, in memory of Nicolò di Giovanni Pico (died in 1448) and his wife Maddalena d'Orlando Pallavicino.

Other members of the Pico family were buried in a crypt (looted in the 19th century) reached from the chapel of the Blessed Virgin of Reggio.

== Bell tower ==
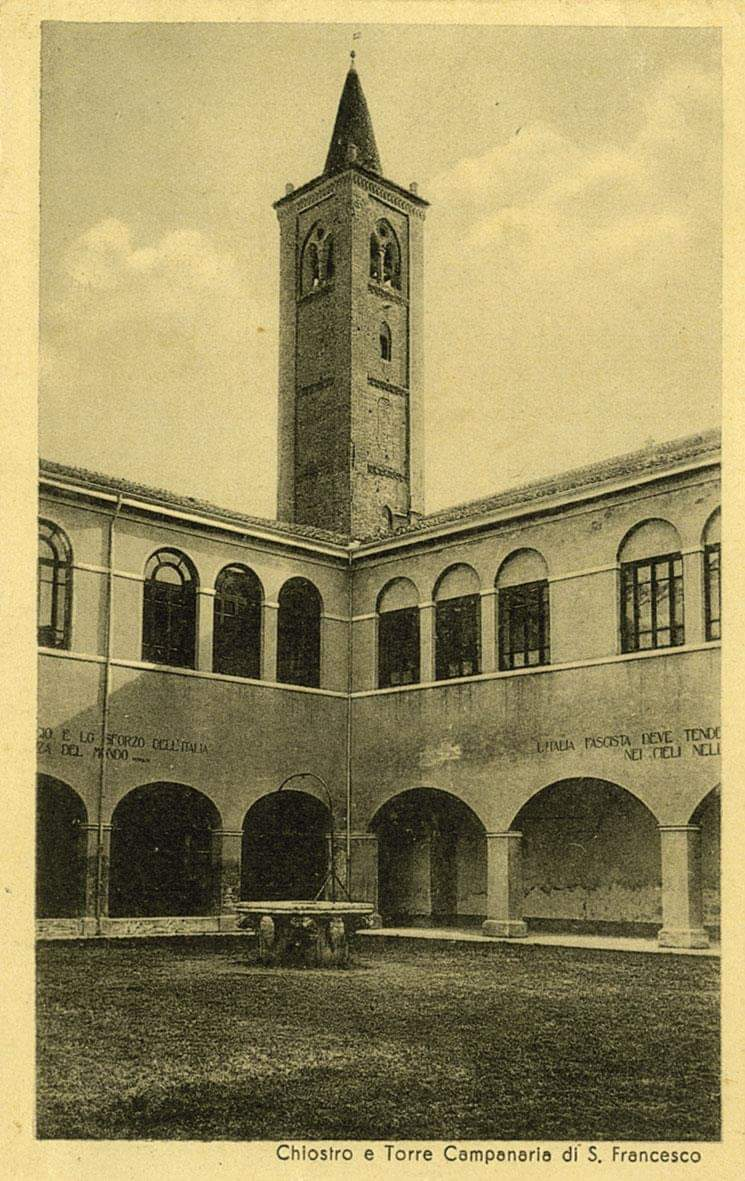
Cloister and bell tower in Fascist times

The bell tower of San Francesco, unfortunately completely lost after it collapsed on 29 May 2012 during the second great quake of the 2012 Emilia earthquake, was completed in 1447 on Geminiano Sefanini's commission and was 62.2 mirandolesi arms high, equivalent to about 39.5 m, excluding the conical pinnacle covered with tiles, between which an iron sword was stuck.

In 1829, 19th century restorers altered the tower windows to a single light on the north and south sides. In 1927, restoration work in the 15th-century style brought the mullioned windows back to the same level as those on the other sides.

== Convent of St. Francis ==
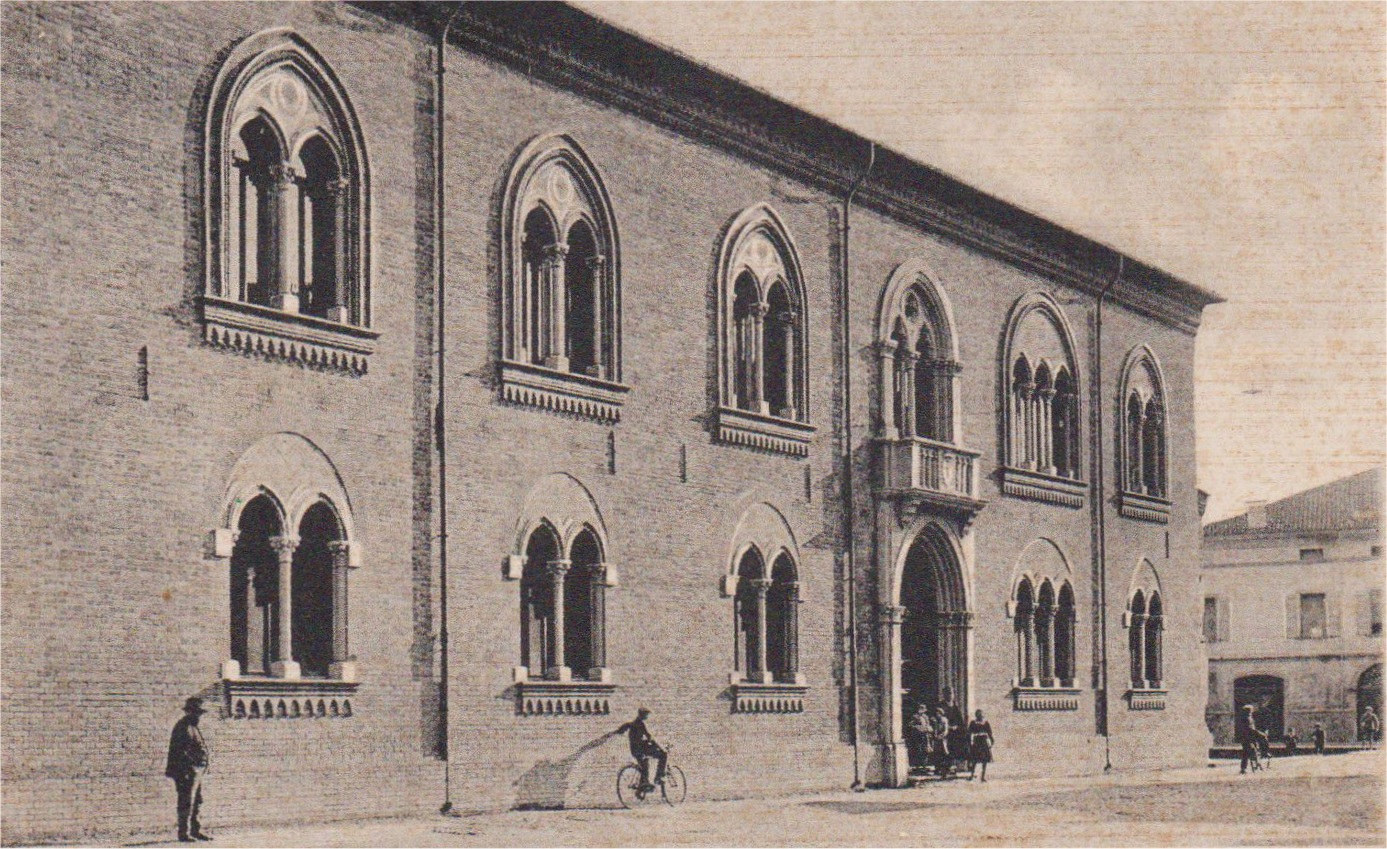
Neo-Gothic façade of the former Franciscan monastery, built in the 1920s

The convent next to the church was built at the same time as the church, although its presence is only documented with certainty in 1377, when the tenants and nobles of Mirandola drew up a letter in which it is stated that the convent was built from the ancient (quod ab antiquo constructum fuit Mirandulae quoddam monasterium S. Francisci) and at that time the Friars Minor Conventual had returned. In a later document of 1385, the presence of the convent is attested in the inventory of the properties of the Franciscan Minorite Province of Bologna.

In 1461-1462 the monastery was entrusted to the Observant Friars Minor, who remained there until 1823. In the 15th century the convent, together with the church, was enlarged by Costanza Pico. A document from 1503 attests to the presence of a large library, with manuscripts but also printed works (the relationship between Pico della Mirandola and Aldus Manutius is well known). In 1566 loggias and rooms were added, while the monastic garden was enlarged. In 1609, Prince Alessandro I Pico had a second cloister built to the east of the existing one, next to the apse of the church. In 1671 the first cloister was restored by order of Duke Alessandro II Pico and twenty years later it was further enlarged with another 16 cells. In the 18th century the monastery reached the height of its splendour: at the beginning of the 18th century the surrounding walls were restored and the vegetable gardens were improved with masonry work and the major damage caused by the War of the Spanish Succession and the end of the Pico seigniory was repaired. The roofs, floors and infirmary were rebuilt, without changing the original layout of the monastery. The friars contributed directly to the maintenance of the roads pertaining to their properties, including what was then known as "Terranuova". In 1783, part of the monastery was destined to house a public school for the teaching of rhetoric, humanistic philosophy and grammar; in 1826 these schools took the name Professorio.

Due to the Napoleonic suppression of religious orders, the convent was bought by Francesco Facci in 1811, who partially demolished it the following year.

During the numerous military sieges Mirandola suffered, many books from the monastery were lost and in 1812 the library was completely destroyed. In 1823 the convent was assigned to the reformed Friars Minor (who remained until 1867); already in 1824 the Franciscan friars partially reconstructed the book heritage (which has survived to the present day and is preserved in the historical archives of the Mirandola municipal library), following a grant of 14,000 lire from the Duke of Modena Francesco IV of Habsburg-Este for the reconstruction and purchase of the garden and the remains of the old convent; the work lasted until 1828.

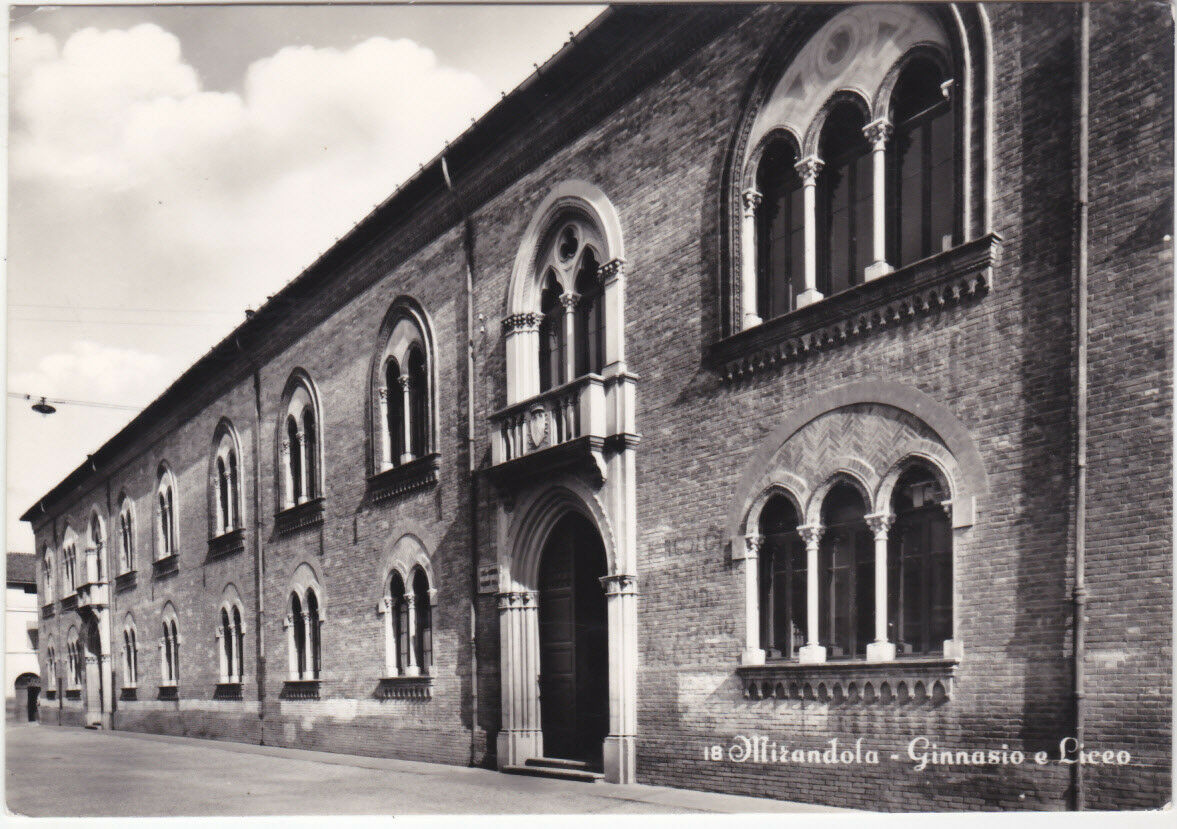
Facade of the Liceo-Ginnasio building

In 1867 the reformed Friars Minor left the monastery, which became municipal property and was used as a communal space. From 1870 it housed the municipal library (later transferred in the 1990s to the nearby Jesuit monastery in Via Francesco Montanari), the middle school (in the northern cloister) and the "Giovanni Pico" grammar school in the central cloister. In the 1920s the neo-Gothic façade on Piazza Giuseppe Garibaldi was rebuilt. In 1960-1961 a new building was built behind the church to house the friars, also owned by the municipality.

The 2012 earthquake also seriously damaged the former convent, making it unfit for use. Because of the serious damage, which involved the structure and interior (the exterior, however, is almost intact), the high school was transferred to the new school complex in Via Vittime del 29 maggio 2012, on the outskirts of Mirandola.

The post-earthquake restoration and redevelopment project envisages bringing the Eugenio Garin Municipal Library and cultural centre back into the former convent, which will also be equipped with a cafeteria, a conference room, the headquarters of the 'Giovanni Pico della Mirandola' International Study Centre, a new gallery for exhibitions and temporary shows, and the municipal historical archive, while the square in front of Piazza Giuseppe Garibaldi should be pedestrianised, removing the existing car park. It is also planned to create small shops inside the cloister, to make it usable and frequented throughout the day.

== See also ==
- Mirandola
- Francis of Assisi
- 2012 Northern Italy earthquakes

== Bibliography ==
- Vilmo Cappi (1987). La chiesa e il convento di San Francesco d'Assisi della Mirandola. Banca Popolare dell'Emilia.
- Vilmo Cappi (1973). Mirandola, storia urbanistica di una città. Modena: Artioli.
- Felice Ceretti (1878). Indicazioni Topografiche-storiche della Mirandola.
- Felice Ceretti (1882). "La chiesa e il convento di S. Francesco d'Assisi della Mirandola, a ricordo del VII centenario di S. Francesco d'Assisi celebrato a Mirandola".
- Felice Ceretti (1890). "Delle chiese della Mirandola". VIII (tomo 2°).
- Francesco Inazio Papotti; Serafino Giglioli della Mirandola (1797). "Memorie storiche della chiesa e convento di S. Francesco".
- Giuseppe Grana (1981). "Chiese della Mirandola". San Felice sul Panaro: Cassa di risparmio di Mirandola - Azienda grafica sanfeliciana.
- Pellegrino Papotti (1835). "Dissertazione sulla mirabile antichità in Mirandola della chiesa e convento di S. Francesco".
- Pellegrino Papotti (1859). "Storia della chiesa e del convento di S. Francesco della Mirandola compilata da me d.p.P.P. mirandolese".
- Flaminio di Parma (1760). Della Chiesa, e Convento di San Francesco della Mirandola. Parma: Regio-ducal stamperia degli Eredi Monti in Borgo Riolo. pp. 1–44.
