= Mirandola witch trials =

16th-century witch trials in Mirandola, Italy

The Mirandola witch trials took place in Mirandola in the Duchy of Mirandola in Italy between 1522 and 1525. It resulted in the death of ten people (seven men and three women), who were burned alive at the stake for witchcraft on the square.

The witch trials attracted attention in contemporary Italy, and were the subject of Libro detto strega o delle illusioni del demonio (1523) by Gianfrancesco Pico, considered the first book about witchcraft and demonology in vulgar Latin.

== Background ==
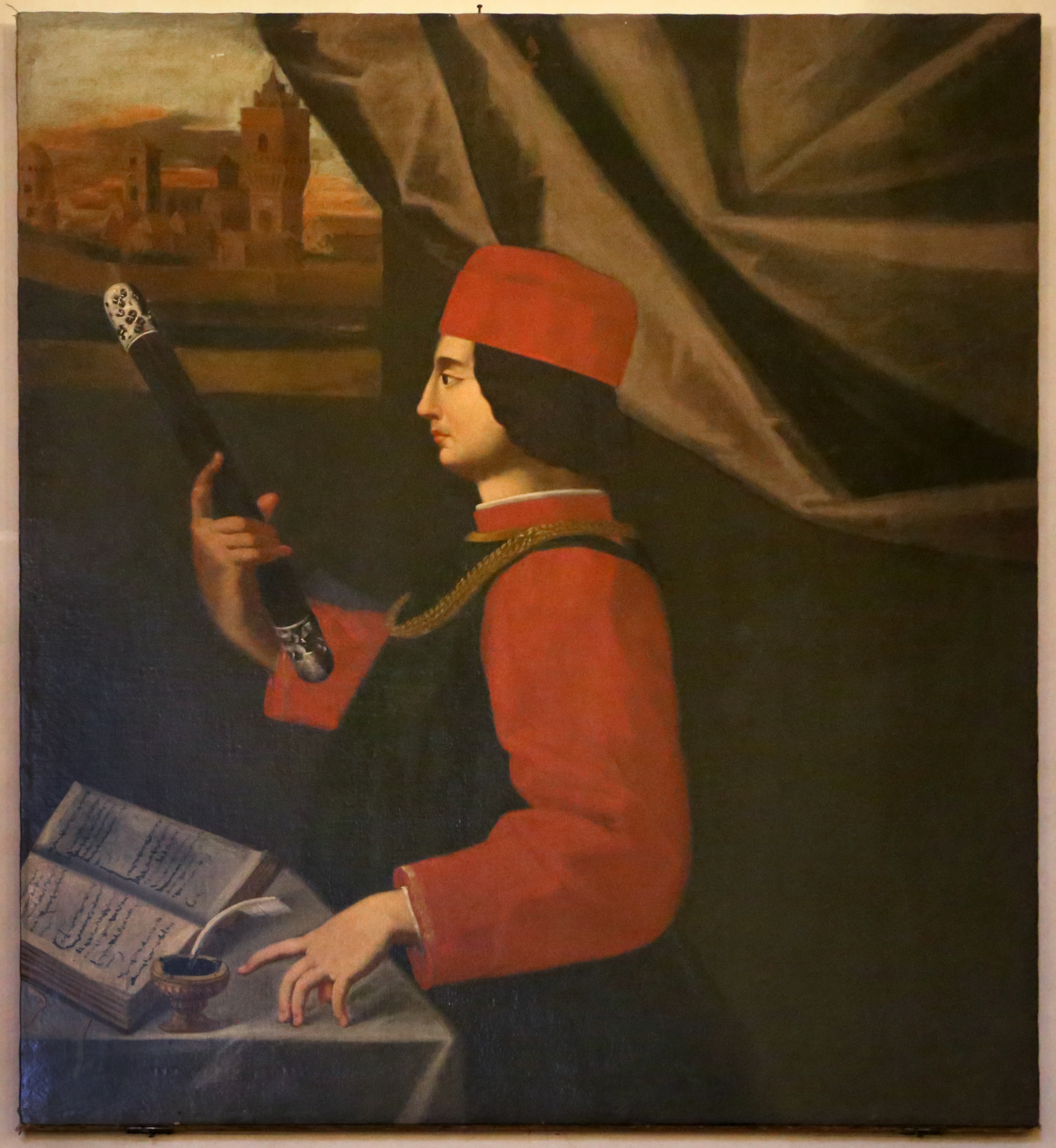
Portrait of Giovanfrancesco Pico della Mirandola (Palazzo ducale of Mantua)

The Mirandola witch hunt was part of a historical period dominated by a relentless series of clashes and wars over the domination of the fortress-city of Mirandola, claimed by the antagonistic branches of the Pico family represented by Giovanni Francesco II Pico della Mirandola against his sister-in-law Francesca Trivulzio, wife of Ludovico I Pico della Mirandola and stepmother-regent of Galeotto II Pico della Mirandola.

Already immediately after the siege of Mirandola in 1502, which had led to the exile of Gianfrancesco II Pico, on the orders of the new Lord Ludovico I Pico della Mirandola the Florentine friar Pietro Bernardino (or Bernardo), accused of heresy and sodomy, for being a follower of Girolamo Savonarola and founder of a sect of "whiners" who had elected him as antipope, was burned alive.

After the siege of Mirandola in 1510-1511 by Pope Julius II against Francesca Trivulzio, Gianfrancesco II Pico was put back in power, and he continued his maneuvers to eliminate his enemies and maintain the Seignory of Mirandola: many accused of witchcraft were in fact important figures from the territory of Concordia (where Francesca Trivulzio was staying) or well known to the population of the Mirandola area and its surroundings, including many priests. Many trials ended with a dismissal (non apparet expeditio), often as a result of the accused's act of abjuration; other times the proceedings were interrupted as a result of the accused's escape, who was then hidden and protected by the population.

In 1524 Giovanna Carafa, the wife of Gianfrancesco II Pico and described as a 'tyrannically avaricious woman', was accused by the partisans of her nephew Galeotto II Pico della Mirandola of forging gold coins (doubloons and ducats) minted by the Mirandola Mint out of resentment against her husband, but she blamed the Jewish mintmaster Santo di Bochali (a mere executor of the sovereign's wishes), who was beheaded in the main square by Giovanfrancesco II to save his wife's reputation.

In 1533 Gianfrancesco Pico was finally killed by his nephew Galeotto II Pico della Mirandola.

== Witch trials ==
The Inquisition began in 1522 when Dominican friar Girolamo Armellini arrived from Faenza, who had jurisdiction over the diocese of Reggio Emilia and who was investigating rumours of strange nocturnal rituals that took place in the countryside crossed by the Secchia river, especially in the villa of Cividale near Mirandola. According to Friar Leandro Alberti, in these sabbaths the participants allegedly practised abominable acts, including the so-called 'Game of Diana', which consisted of scandalous sins of the flesh and gluttony as well as contempt for the Crucifix and consecrated hosts.

Assisted by the Florentine Luca Bettini (vicar general of the Holy Office), the inquisitor Fra Girolamo Armellini opened a criminal trial against around 60 people. The doctor Giovanni Mainardi was also a witness in the trials. Moreover, the inquisitor of Mantua claimed the jurisdiction of Mirandola in his district, which also led to a clash between Gianfrancesco Pico and the marquis of Mantua Federico II Gonzaga, represented in the city of Concordia by his governor Francesco Suardo.

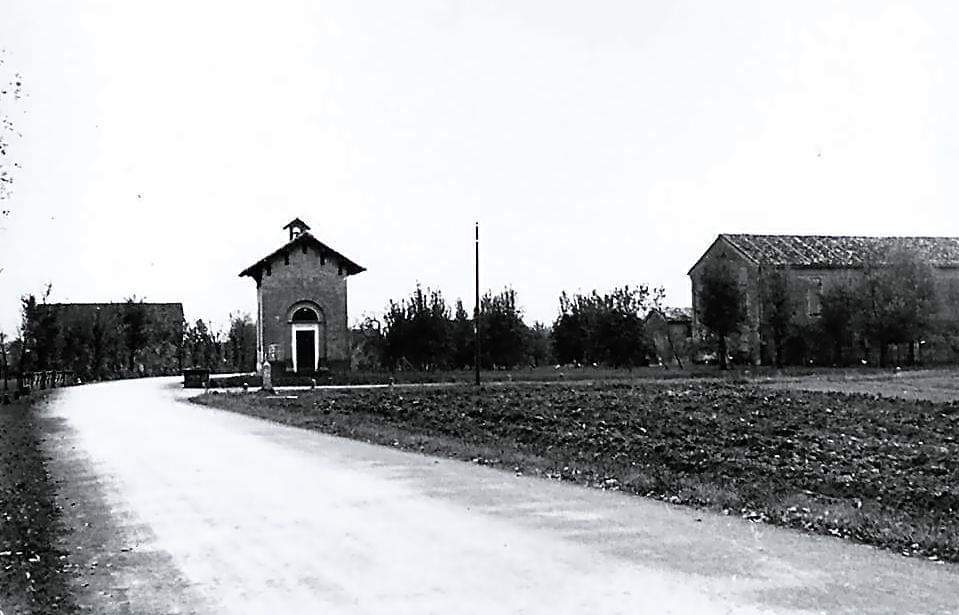
The Oratory of the Madonna della Via di Mezzo (1950)

The trials and interrogations, also conducted with torture, took place at the Dominican convent located at the current Oratory of the Madonna della Via di Mezzo, between the Mirandola hamlets of San Giacomo Roncole and San Martino Carano, at the intersection of today's Via Mercadante and Via Serafina.

On 22 August 1522 the first accused, Don Benedetto Berni, was burnt at the stake, and the same fate befell Francesco da Carpi, Bernardina Frigieri, Maddalena Gatti, Camilla Gobetta del Borghetto, Andrea Merlotti and Marco Piva the following year.

Public opinion in Mirandola began to harshly criticise these death sentences, so that in May 1523 Giovanni Francesco Pico had to quickly (in just ten days) write and publish in Bologna the three-book dialogue Strix, sive de ludificatione daemonum to justify the killing of those accused of witchcraft.

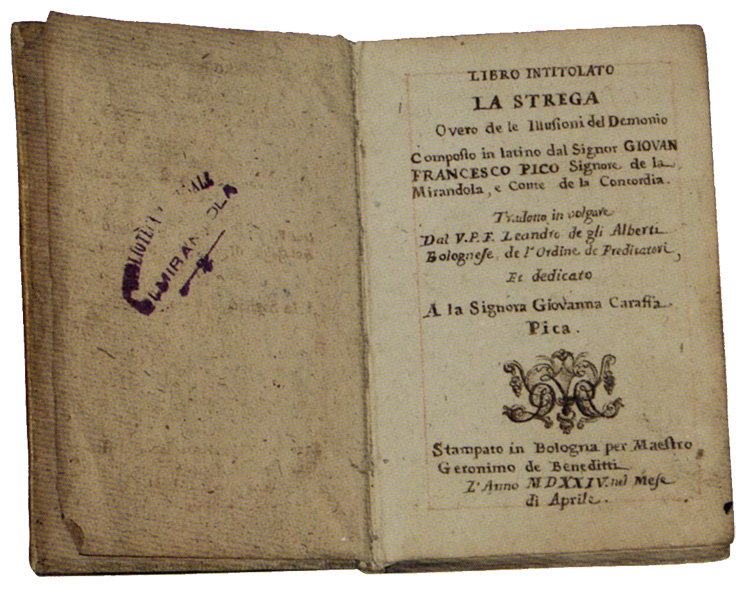
La Strega ovvero delle illusioni del demonio, translated into italian by Leandro Alberti (1524)

At the end of 1523, three others arrested (the notary Giovan Pietro Colovati, Nicolò Ferrari from Mirandola and Aiolfo della Bernarda) managed to escape to Modena, finding refuge with the bishop's vicar. The inquisitor Fra Girolamo Armellini then appealed to Pope Clement VII, who on 18 January 1524 instructed Francesco Silvestri (inquisitor in Bologna) and Altobello Averoldi (bishop of Pula and deputy legate in Bologna) to capture the fugitives, who were finally tracked down and burned alive in 1525.

In the meantime, in 1524, the dialogue written by Gianfrancesco Pico had been translated into the Italian vernacular by the Bolognese Dominican friar Leandro Alberti, who dedicated the edition to Giovanna Carafa, wife of the Lord of Mirandola. Alberti's translation (re-edited by Albano Biondi in 1989) is recorded as the first treatise on demonology published in the vernacular.

In 1555, the work was again translated into Italian by Abbot Turino Turini. This edition was republished in 1864 by G. Daelli in the Biblioteca rara series.

== Victims ==
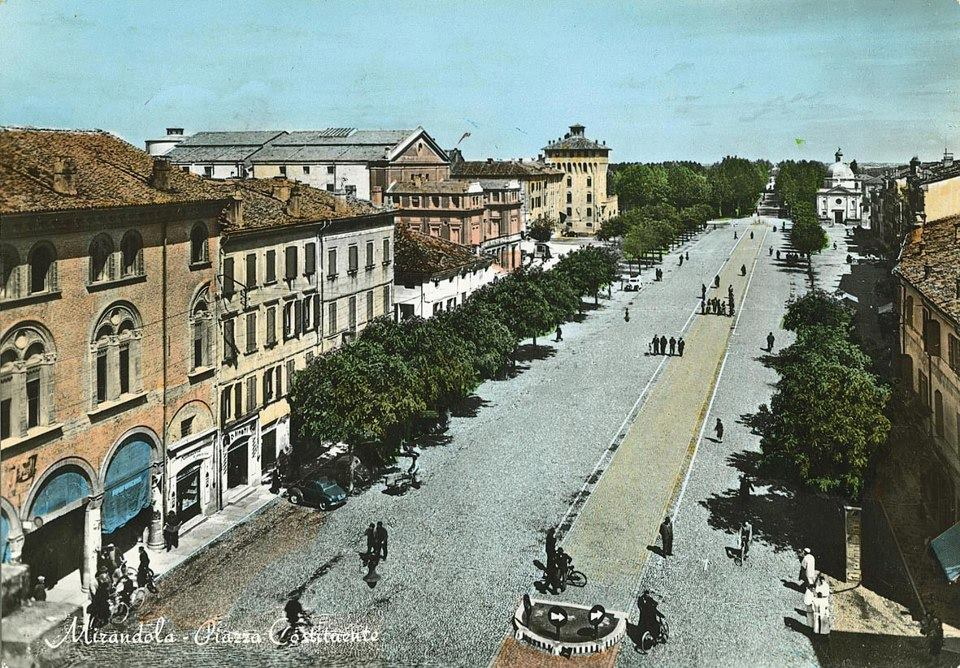
Piazza della Costituente (Mirandola)

The people found guilty of witchcraft and burnt alive on the Piazza of Mirandola between 1522 and 1525 were:

1. don Benedetto Berni, a priest well known in the castle of Mirandola and accused of administering consecrated hosts to a witch so that he could use them in his spells;
2. Francesco da Carpi, from Cividale;
3. Bernardina Frigeria, from Cividale;
4. Camilla Gobeta, from Borghetto di Cividale;
5. Maddalena Gatti, from San Felice sul Panaro
6. Marco Piva, from the castle of the Comunaglia (now via Castello, between San Martino Carano and San Possidonio);
7. Andrea Merlotti, a.k.a.il Piva Mantovano, from Fossa (Concordia sulla Secchia);
8. Aiolfo della Bernarda, from Mirandola countryside;
9. Nicolò Ferrari, from Mirandola;
10. Giovan Pietro Colovati, from Mirandola.

The stake at which they were burnt alive was set up in the centre of the Piazza Grande (now called Piazza della Costituente), opposite the San Ludovico tower of the castle of the Pico.

== Other trials ==
After the great witch hunts of 1522-1525, there were many other individual trials for witchcraft (against women) or blasphemy (against men). Of particular note are the burnings of the jew Guglielmo di Arezzo (1560) and the physician Pietro Capizi (1561), Caterina Pivia from Concordia (1588), Cecilia Pollastri from Cividale (1598), Antonio Fedozzi (1599), Contina from Mortizzuolo (1616), Giulia and Caterina Montanari from Fossa (1616), and Ludovico Gigli from San Possidonio (1616).

From the 18th century onwards, following the annexation of Mirandola to the Duchy of Modena, other trials for magic and witchcraft (in this case also against men) and for heresy are documented, mainly due to the spread of Lutheranism imported into this territory by the occupying imperial armies, as well as the fact that many of these accused were also linked to Freemasonry. The Modena Inquisition tribunal was abolished on 6 September 1785 by Duke Ercole III d'Este.

== Legacy ==
In the past, before the commercial spread of the figure of Santa Claus, the celebration of Epiphany, called La vécia (old woman) in the Mirandola dialect, was very much felt in the Mirandola area, somehow recalling the dark times of witch hunts.

In particular, there was the tradition that 'at the stroke of midnight, on the night eve of Epiphany, the parish priest of San Martino Carano, a locality one kilometre from the city on the border with the oratory of the "Madonna della via di Mezzo", would go to the crossroads in a purple cope, equipped with an aspergillum and holy water, to drive the witches away from the confines of the villa.

In Mirandola cuisine, the preparation of the traditional thin focaccia made with flour, lard and fat (there is also a variant flavoured with garlic) is called stria (witch) and it is still in use, whose name is said to derive from the fact that it is baked first to check the right oven temperature for baking the other varieties of bread; according to another tradition, the browning of the stria evokes the yellowish colour of the witches' hard skin.

== Bibliography ==
- Luca Al Sabbagh (2013). "Processo alle streghe di Mirandola (1522-1525)". Dizionario di eretici, dissidenti e inquisitori nel mondo mediterraneo. Firenze: Edizioni CLORI. doi:10.5281/zenodo.1309444. ISBN 978-88-942416-0-0.
- Albano Biondi, ed. (1989). Libro detto Strega o Delle illusioni del demonio del signore Giovanfrancesco Pico dalla Mirandola nel volgarizzamento di Leandro Alberti. Venezia: Marsilio.
- Paola Castelli (2010). "Il demonio e la zampa d'oca nella "Strix" di Gianfrancesco Pico della Mirandola". In Salvatore Geruzzi (ed.). Uomini, demoni, santi e animali tra Medioevo ed Età moderna. Pisa-Roma: Fabrizio Serra editore. pp. 121–160. ISBN 978-88-6227-233-9.
- Gustavo Costa (1990). "Love and Witchcraft in Gianfrancesco Pico della Mirandola: La Strega between the Sublime and the Grotesque". Italica. 67 (4). American Association of Teachers of Italian: 427–439. doi:10.2307/479089. JSTOR 479089.
- Paolo Golinelli. La religiosità popolare tra devozione e non conformismo religioso. Archived from the original (DOC) on 2019-02-13.
- Tamar Herzig (2003). "The Demons' Reaction to Sodomy: Witchcraft and Homosexuality in Gianfrancesco Pico della Mirandola's "Strix"". The Sixteenth Century Journal. 34 (1): 53–72. doi:10.2307/20061313. JSTOR 20061313.
- Marina Montesano (1996). Le streghe. Firenze: Giunti Editore. ISBN 9788809023055.
- Lucia Pappalardo (2017). "Credere alla streghe per credere a Dio. A margine della Strix sive de ludificatione daemonum di Gianfrancesco Pico della Mirandola". Rinascimento. LVII.
- Alberto Perifrano (2008). "La demonologia come demonolatria nella Strix di Giovanfrancesco Pico della Mirandola". In Dinora Corsi; Matteo Duni (eds.). Non lasciar vivere la malefica: le streghe nei trattati e nei processi (secoli XIV-XVII). Firenze: Firenze University Press. ISBN 978-88-8453-808-6.
- Michael Tavuzzi (2007). Renaissance inquisitors: Dominican inquisitors and inquisitorial districts in Northern Italy, 1474-1527. Leiden: Brill. pp. 68-72. ISBN 9789004160941.

== Filmography ==
- Marta La Licata; Fedora Sasso (2015). Eccellentissima Strega: tre processi dell'Inquisizione. Rai Cultura – via YouTube.

== See also ==
- Castle of the Pico
- Duchy of Mirandola
- Giovanni Francesco Pico della Mirandola
