= Galeotto =

Galeotto is an Italian name used in the Middle Ages. In modern Italian language, it means prisoner.

== People ==
Galeotto is the name of:

- Galeotto Franciotti della Rovere (1471–1507), Italian Roman Catholic bishop and cardinal
- Galeotto Graziani (died 1522), Italian monk and the first bishop of Sansepolcro
- Galeotto I Malaspina (died 1367), Italian judge and nobleman
- Galeotto I Malatesta (1299–1385), Italian condottiero, who was lord of Rimini, Fano, Ascoli Piceno, Cesena and Fossombrone
- Galeotto I Pico (1442–1499), Italian condottieri and nobleman, lord of Mirandola and Count of Concordia
- Galeotto II Pico della Mirandola (1508–1550), Italian condottiere
- Galeotto Manfredi (1440–1488), Italian condottiero and lord of Faenza
- Galeotto Roberto Malatesta (1411–1432), Italian condottiero

== Other uses ==
- Prencipe Galeotto, subtitle of The Decameron, in reference to Prince Galehaut
