= Gianfrancesco I =

Gianfrancesco I may refer to:

- Gianfrancesco I Gonzaga, Marquis of Mantua (1395–1444)
- Gianfrancesco I Pico (1415–1467)
- Gianfrancesco I Pallavicino (died 1497)
