= Galeotto I Pico =

15th-century Italian soldier and nobleman

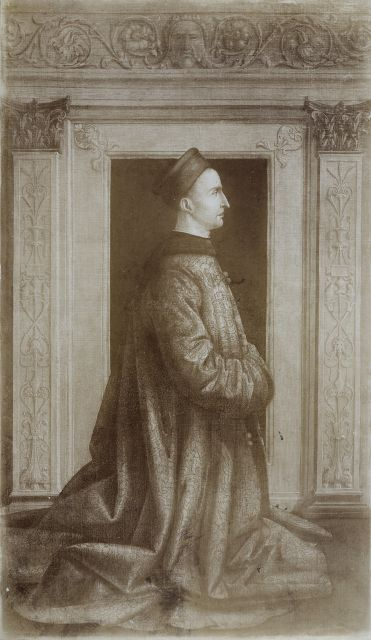
- Galeotto I (Palazzo Schifanoia, Ferrara)

Duke of Mirandola
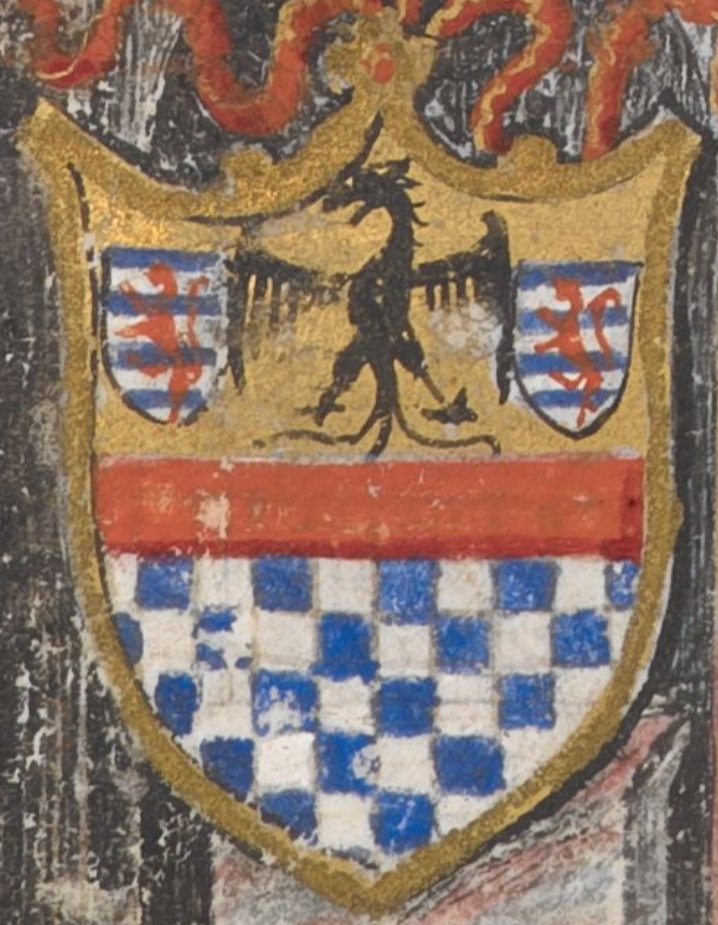
- Coat of arms
- Reign: 8 November 1467 - 9 April 1499
- Predecessor: Gianfrancesco I Pico
- Successor: Giovanni Francesco Pico della Mirandola
- Born: 3 August 1442; Mirandola, Italy
- Died: 9 April 1499 (aged 56); Mirandola, Italy
- Buried: Church of San Francesco, Mirandola
- Noble family: Pico Family
- Spouse: Bianca Maria d'Este
- Father: Gianfrancesco I Pico
- Mother: Giulia Boiardo

Galeotto I Pico della Mirandola (3 August 1442 - 9 April 1499) was an Italian condottiero and nobleman, Signore of Mirandola and Concordia. He was noted by contemporaries for his tyranny. The son of Gianfrancesco I Pico, Galeotto initially allied himself to the Duchy of Ferrara, first fighting for Duke Borso d'Este and then Ercole I d'Este, with whom he formed a strong bond. In 1486, he switched allegiance to Ludovico Sforza, Duke of Milan. He fought his brother Antonio for the Signoria of Mirandola. He was ultimately successful in the last battle, taking his brother's place in 1491, which was reaffirmed two years later. He died in 1499 and was succeeded by his son Giovanni Francesco.

== Biography ==
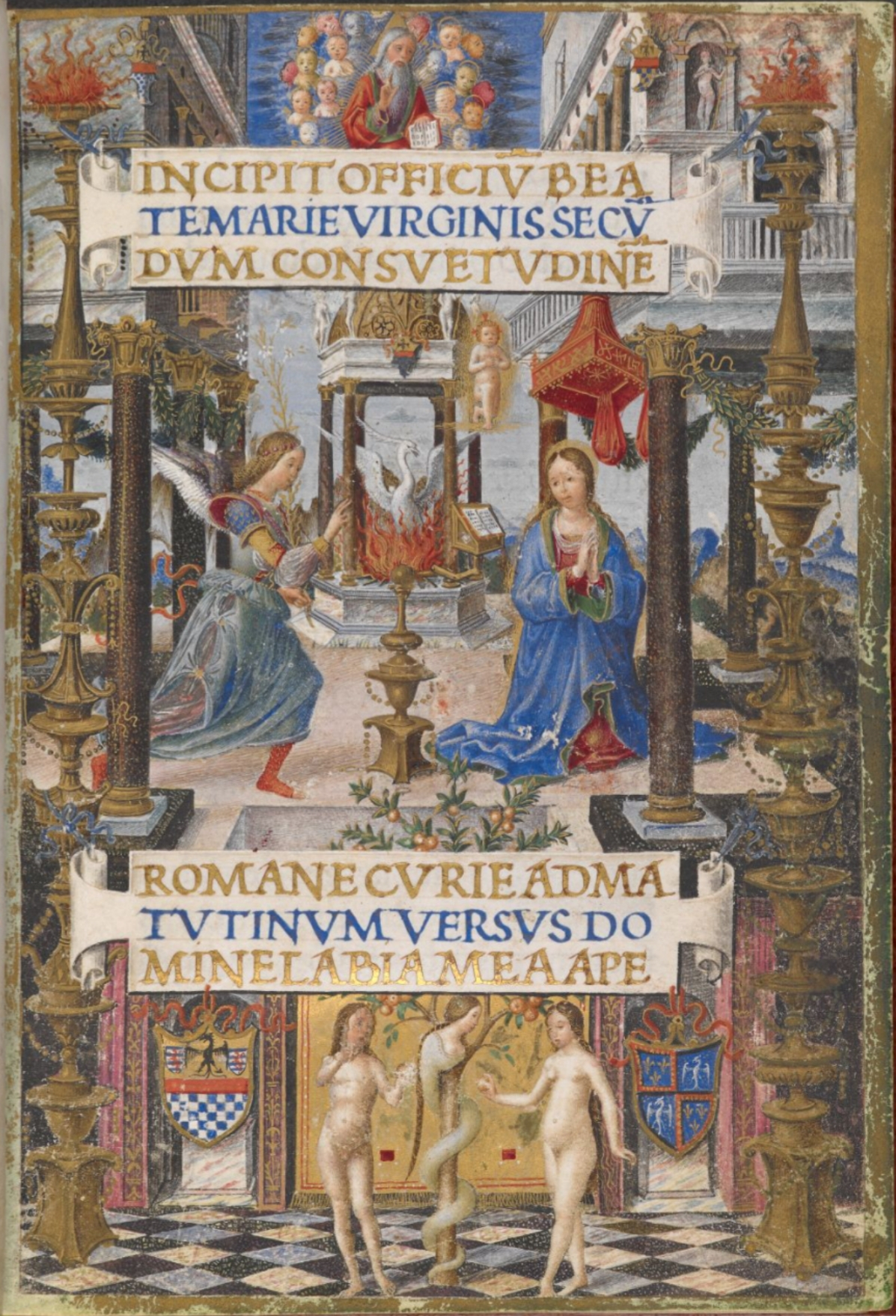
Giovanni Francesco Maineri, The Mirandola Hours (British Library). In the lower margin are the arms of Galeotto I (at the left) and the arms of his wife, Bianca d'Este (at the right).

Born on 3 August 1442, Galeotto was the eldest son of Gianfrancesco I Pico, ruler of the Signoria of Mirandola, and Giulia Boiardo, daughter of Feltrino Boiardo, Count of Scandiano, and Guiduccia of Correggio. He had two younger brothers, Antonio Maria and Giovanni, and three younger sisters, Caterina, Giulia and Lucrezia.

Galeotto was knighted in Ferrara in 1452 by Emperor Frederick III, when he appointed Duke Borso d'Este to become the Duke of the city. In 1467 he fought for the Duke beside Bartolomeo Colleoni against the Medici, returning to Mirandola after the death of his father on 8 November to take over the dukedom. On the death of Borso on 20 August 1471, Galeotto strengthened his friendship with the new Duke, Ercole I d'Este, by entering into a treaty of alliance. On 9 January 1476, he joining a coterie of ambassadors sent to Naples to escort his bride, Eleanor of Aragon to Ferrara.

In 1470 he imprisoned his brother Antonio Maria on the pretext of wanting to suppress disorder. Although Antonio was released after two years, this did not quell his hatred against Galeotto. Instead, on 19 November, he led a rebellion against his brother, which was followed by counter rebellion on 8 December. Galeotto was left in charge until the Pazzi conspiracy of 26 April 1478. He was exiled to the Republic of Venice after the riots that followed the conspiracy but was still active, sending aid to Tuscany to help the Florentines. Accused of having betrayed the Venetians, in 1486 he changed his allegiance to the Duke of Milan, Ludovico Sforza, who elected him governor of Parma. He fought for the Duchy of Milan in the Battle of Fornovo on 6 July 1495.

Through the mediation of Ludovico with the emperor, Galeotto managed to regain his status in Mirandola in 1491. Old grudges toward his brother Antonio, however, continued for two years, when Antonio was declared guilty of felony and Galeotto confirmed in his titles. His action led him to be considered a tyrant by contemporaries, including the Dominican friar Girolamo Savonarola, who wrote two letters to him, the second dated 26 March 1496, commending him to reform his ways and to "live as it became a Christian."

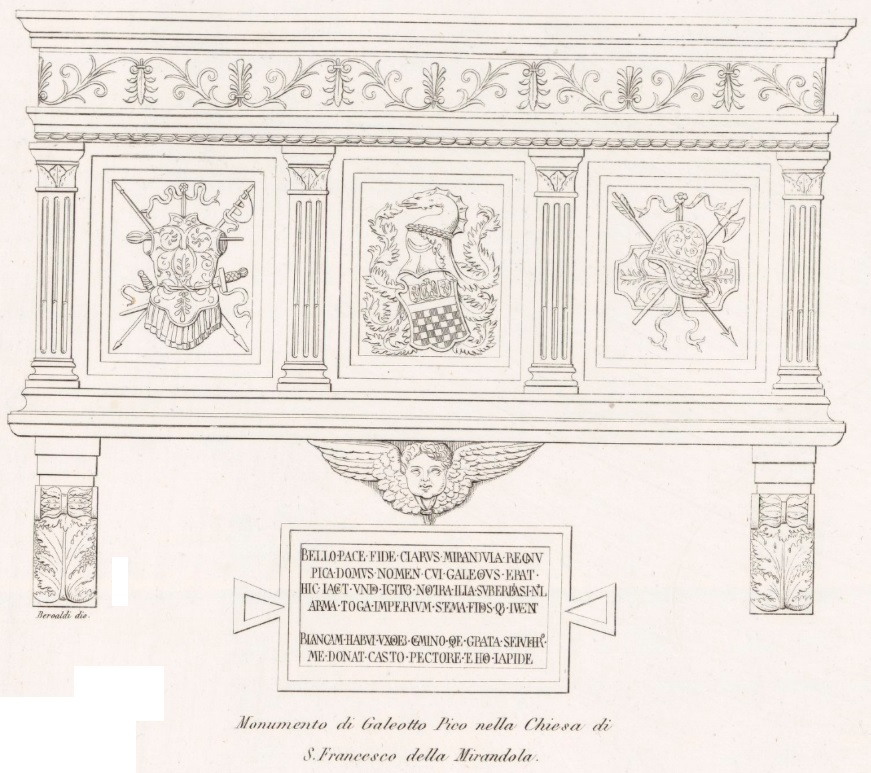
Tomb of Galeotto I Pico (Church of San Francesco, Mirandola)

Galeotto died on 9 April 1499. He was buried in the Church of San Francesco in Mirandola, despite his excommunication for the usurpation of his brother Antonio, for which he obtained a papal dispensation. His wife Bianca erected a monument in the church. He was succeeded by his son Giovanni Francesco.

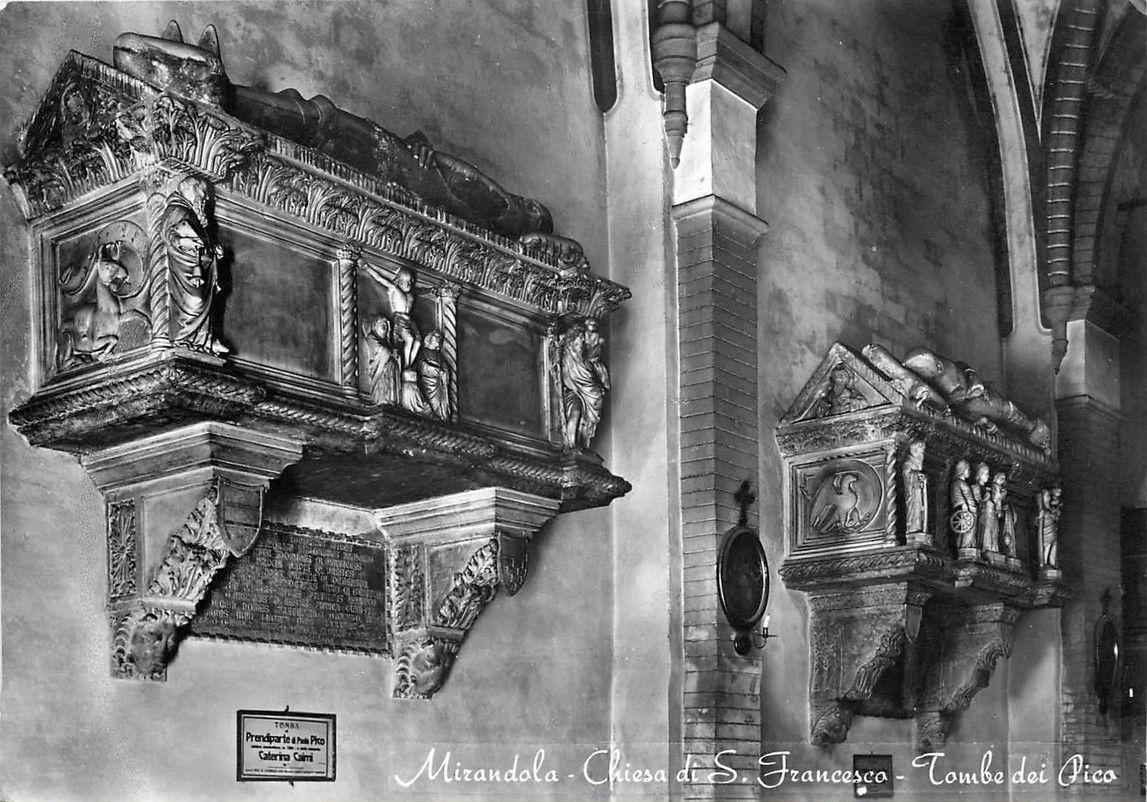
The Pico family memorial in the Church of San Francesco in Mirandola

== Family ==
Galeotto married Bianca d'Este (1440-1506), daughter of Niccolò III d'Este, Marquis of Ferrara, in Mirandola in 1468. At the wedding, a tournament was held with a prize of a piece of silk greenery. They had six children:

- Giovanni Francesco (1469-1533), his successor as Lord of Mirandola and Concordia
- Federico (1470-1503), future co-ruler of Mirandola and Concordia
- Ludovico (1472-1509), future co-ruler of Mirandola and Concordia
- Maddalena (1473-1542), Clarisse nun in Santa Clara Monastery of Florence
- Galeotto (1474-1533), killed by his nephew Galeotto
- Eleanor (1478-c. 1525), who married firstly Paolo Bolognini Attendolo and secondly Galeazzo Pallavicino.

Galeotto also had two illegitimate children named Susanna and Lucrezia.

Galeotto I Pico House of Pico
Regnal titles
Preceded by Gianfrancesco I	Signore of Mirandola; 1467-1499	Succeeded by Gianfrancesco II
