= Gianfrancesco II =

Gianfrancesco II may refer to:

- Gianfrancesco II Pico (1470–1533), better known as Giovanni Francesco Pico della Mirandola
- Gianfrancesco II da Correggio (died 1531)
- Gianfrancesco II Gonzaga (1646–1703), prince of Bozzolo
