= Eugenio Garin Municipal Library =

Public library in Mirandola, Italy

Coordinates: 44°52′45.95″N 11°04′41.56″E

- Biblioteca comunale Eugenio Garin
- Location: Mirandola, Province of Modena, Emilia-Romagna, Italy
- Type: Public library
- Established: 1870; 156 years ago

Collection
- Size: 217,955 item (2019), 308 item (2019), 35,000 item (2020), 221,004 item (2022), 625 item (2022), 83,585 volume, 10 item

The Eugenio Garin Municipal Library (Italian: biblioteca comunale Eugenio Garin) (abbreviated as BEG) is a public library in Mirandola, in the province of Modena in Italy.

The library's ancient collection houses precious sixteenth-century works by Giovanni and Giovanfrancesco Pico, Antonio Possevino, Roberto Bellarmino, and Girolamo Savonarola, including several works printed by Aldo Manuzio.

== History ==
From 1923 to 1927 and from 1945 to 1950, Giovanni Cavicchioli was director of the library, for which he acquired the Teatro series from the Milanese publisher Rosa e Ballo.
