= Giovanni I Pico =

Italian condottiero (d. 1451)

Giovanni I Pico della Mirandola
- Lord of Mirandola
- Coat of arms
- Predecessor: Francesco II Pico
- Successor: Francesco III Pico
- Other titles: Lord of Concordia
- Died: c. 1451
- Noble family: Pico della Mirandola
- Spouse: Caterina Bevilacqua ()
- Father: Francesco II Pico

Giovanni I Pico (died c. 1451) was an Italian nobleman and condottiero. He was lord of Mirandola and Concordia from 1399 until his death.

The son of Francesco II Pico, in 1406 he allied himself with Niccolò III d'Este, lord of Ferrara. In 1420 he abandoned the loyalty to the Ferrarese to serve under the Visconti dukes of Milan until the Peace of Ferrara of 1428. Later he fought again for the Visconti until 1447. Thanks to his loyalty to the Holy Roman Empire, emperor Sigismund granted him the title of count of Concordia.

In 1429 he had assassinated his cousin Aiace, with whom he shared the seigniory of Mirandola and Concordia. Giovanni held the lordship jointly with his other cousin Francesco III until his death. Giovanni had two sons with Caterina Bevilacqua of Verona: Gianfrancesco, who succeeded him, and Niccolò.

== Sources ==
- Pompeo Litta (1835). Famiglie celebri di Italia. Pico della Mirandola. Turin. p. 3.

Preceded by Francesco II	Lord of Mirandola and Concordia; 1399-1451	Succeeded by Francesco III
