= Siege of Mirandola (1502) =

Siege of the city of mirandola

The siege of Mirandola in 1502 was a military conflict involving Giovanni Francesco II Pico della Mirandola against his younger brothers Federico and Ludovico, who bombarded Mirandola for 50 days. Defeated and imprisoned, Francesco II was released only with the promise of cession of the dominions, then retiring into exile for eight years.

== History ==
In March 1491, Giovanni Francesco II Pico della Mirandola married Giovanna Carafa, daughter of Giovanni Tommaso Carafa, count of Maddaloni. The large dowry brought by his wife, helped Francesco II purchase from his uncle Giovanni Pico della Mirandola much of the Mirandola fiefdom, including hereditary rights, arousing the resentment of his younger brothers Federico and Ludovico. Upon the death of his father Galeotto I Pico in 1499, Francesco II chased away his two younger brothers, who thus began to turn to the other courts for support in the restitution of dominion over the city of Mirandola.

The Este artillery left Ferrara on 8 June 1502. The besiegers showed up on 17 June 1502 under the walls of Mirandola, with an army of 3,000 soldiers, formed thanks to the support of Ercole I d'Este, Duke of Ferrara and Francesco II Gonzaga, Marquis of Mantua.

For 14 days, the two sides bombed each other, with mortar shells so loud and powerful that they could be heard as far away as Modena. The siege lasted for over 50 days, exhausting the population. On July 28, Ludovico Pico asked Isabella Gonzaga to send another 100 cannonballs.

While food was starting to run low and Francesco II was in Borgonuovo to stock up, suddenly the besiegers launched the final attack, raising a bridge over the walls. Francesco attempted to return to the Pico castle, jumping on a boat and heading towards the door of the fortress, but by then his brothers had preceded him. Franesco II was imprisoned and, only after the pleas of his wife Giovanna Carafa, was he finally freed, but on condition that he left Mirandola: on 6 August at 9 pm. The capitulation was signed with a pact to save the people and on 8 August the younger brothers were proclaimed rulers of Mirandola. The following day he left Mirandola escorted by his brothers, retreating to the Pio castle in Novi.

== Consequences ==
Ludovico governed Mirandola with an iron fist. Francesco II, a zealous supporter of Girolamo Savonarola, had given Savonarola's followers, including Pietro Bernardino, a friendly reception. Ludovico captured the followers of Savonarola who had been protected by Francesco, burning Bernardino and then executing Cristoforo Grisolfi with eight accomplices accused of treason. Ludovico also tried to eliminate his brother, sending hitmen to Rome but they were discovered, imprisoned and finally pardoned by the Pope.

Francesco II remained in exile for eight years, also going to Rome to ask for help from the Pope and to Germany from Emperor Maximilian. He returned to the city of Pico only in 1511, after the famous siege of Mirandola by Pope Julius II, but remained there for a few months. Only after the agreement with Francesca Trivulzio was he able to return definitively in 1515, only to end up murdered in 1533 by his nephew Galeotto II Pico.
