= Santa Maria Bianca Hospital =

- AUSL Modena
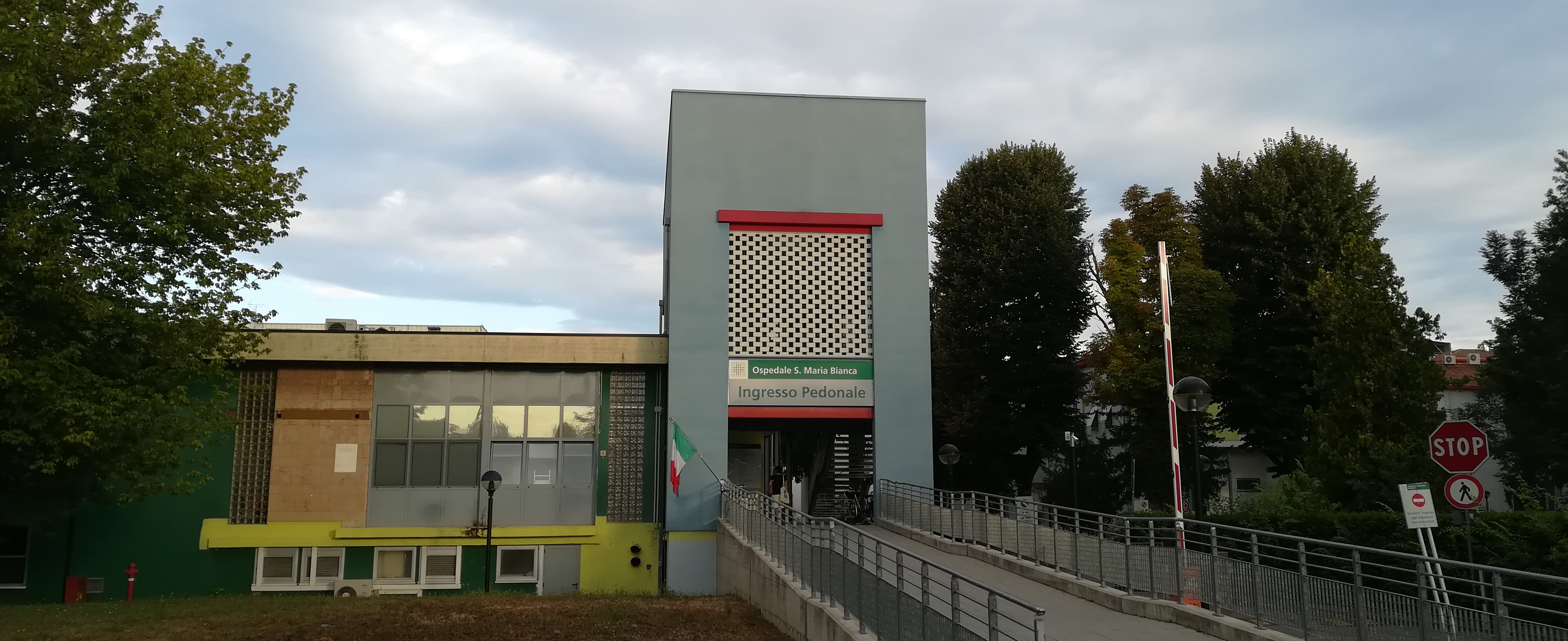

Geography
- Location: Mirandola, province of Modena, Emilia-Romagna, Italy

Organisation
- Care system: Servizio Sanitario Regionale
- Type: Community
- Patron: Santa Maria Bianca

Services
- Emergency department: yes
- Beds: 130

History
- Opened: 1432; 594 years ago

Santa Maria Bianca Hospital is a community hospital located in Mirandola, in the province of Modena, in Emilia-Romagna, Italy.

Founded in 1432 by the Battuti congregation, it takes its name from the hospital's patron saint, Santa Maria Bianca (St. Mary the White), so called because of her white cloak, identical to the one worn by the members of the confraternity. Before its current location, the hospital was formerly located in Piazza del Duomo and then in the former Jesuit monastery in Via Francesco Montanari.

== History ==
=== Origins ===
First records of a "hospitale" in Mirandola dates back to 1311, in a document which also mentions two branches in Tiramuschio (today Tramuschio) and Borgo Bonaga (later called Borgofuro or Borgonovo). Another hospital run by the Hospital Brothers of Saint Anthony was located in Roncole. In 1385, the Mirandola hospitals received a considerable sum of money from certain inheritances; moreover, the ancient Statutes of the land of the municipality of Mirandola and the court of Quarantola of 1386 guaranteed exemption from duty to donors of flour or wheat, as well as movable and immovable property.

=== Foundation ===
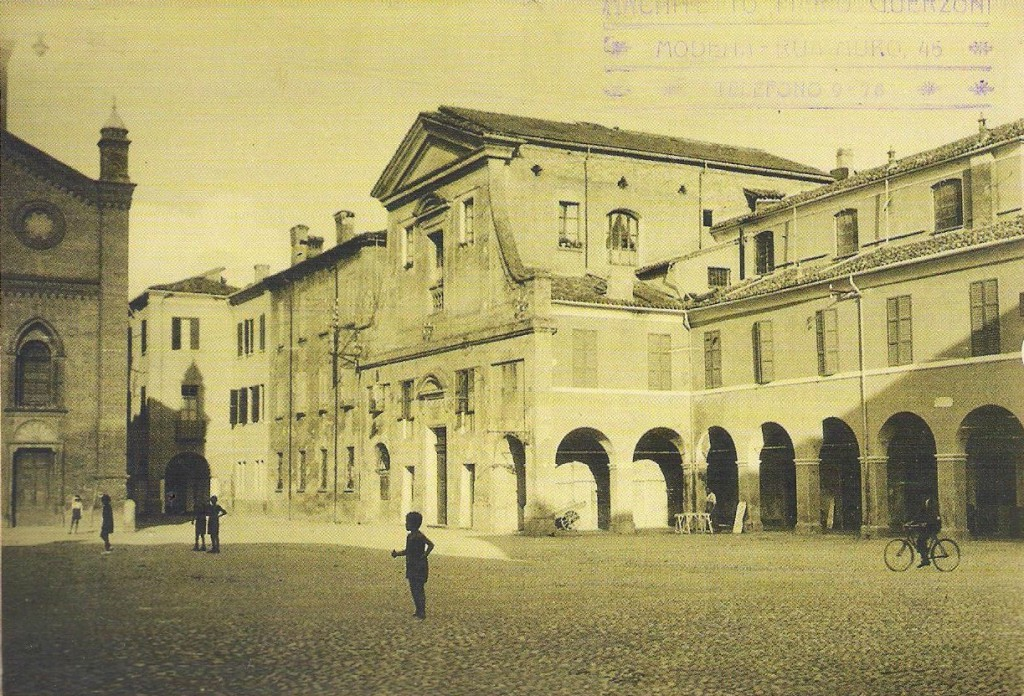
The deconsecrated Church of the Beggars (former Church of Santa Maria Bianca), demolished in 1929 to build the Fascist Militia barracks.

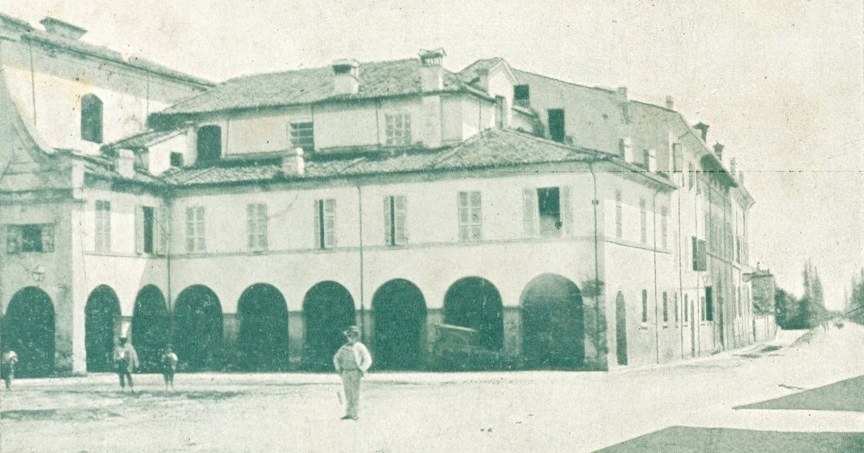
The Royal Magistrate's Court of Mirandola located in the former Battuti Hospital, before its demolition during the Fascist era

The Sacred Hospice of Santa Maria Bianca was founded in 1432 by the Confraternity of the Misericordia dei Battuti, with the aim of "collecting and maintaining the exposed, housing pilgrims and caring for the poor, sick and insane". After a few years, the hospice was enlarged thanks to the considerable inheritance of 550 pounds of bolognini left in 1448 by the nobleman Francesco, son of Antonio Padella of the Manfredi family. The following year, the regents of the Hospitale de Santa Maria Biancha received another inheritance with the will dated 15 March 1449 by Gerardo Padella (the last descendant of this noble and childless family), who donated all his possessions, with the clause that if it was decided to close the hospital all the money from the inheritance should be returned in full to the parish of San Michele arcangelo in Cividale. These bequests made it possible to erect a new building in Borgo Novo, next to the cathedral of Mirandola. In 1473 a fire destroyed the historical archive.

According to a document dated 13 May 1574, drawn up during the pastoral visit of Eustachio Locatelli, bishop of Reggio Emilia, the Mirandola confraternity annually elected a godfather and two massari, who supervised and administered the hospital. During the 17th century the hospice, under the protection of the Princes of Mirandola, was run by the padrino (from 1695 called prior and who administered the religious aspects), the massaro (who dealt with the financial aspects) and a council of eight people.

In 1764, the old hospital factories were established, and after two years, a project for a large building 150 mirandolesi fathoms long (95.7 metres) was approved. The hospital complex, inaugurated in 1767, had a façade characterised by a long portico along the Strada Grande (today's Via Giovanni Pico) and had two courtyards, one of which was smaller at the back, while the cemetery was located on the north side (to the side of the cathedral forecourt). The church of the Battuti was located in the cathedral square. In the years 1762-1764 the building was rebuilt and the portico extended to the cathedral square, where the new oratory of Santa Maria Bianca (later called the Oratory of the Mendicants or the Oratory of the Blessed Virgin Laureatana) was also built.

The hospital was transferred to the former Jesuit monastery in 1785, while the old building was first entrusted to the mendicant order and then housed the Royal Magistrate's Court of Mirandola and the prisons. The old building with its porticoes and the deconsecrated church of Santa Maria dei Battuti have been lost, having been demolished during the Fascist era for the construction of the Palazzo della Milizia in the 1930s.

=== Moving to the former Jesuit monastery ===
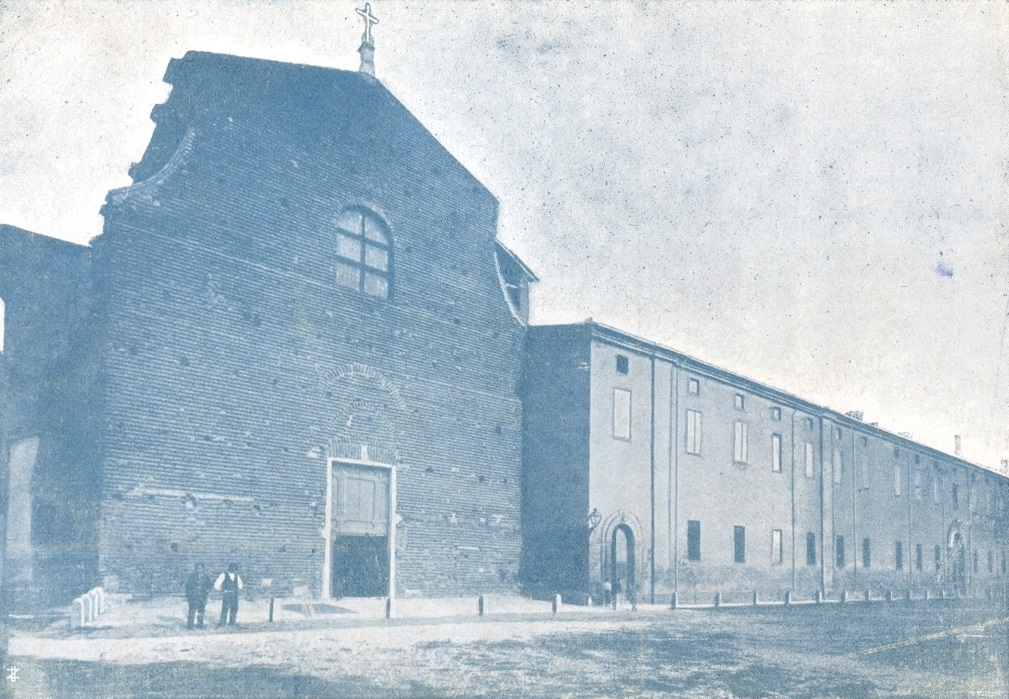
The Church of Gesù and the hospice set up in the former Jesuit monastery (early 20th century)

The hospital was run by the Confraternity of Mercy until 1779, when it was handed over to the General Congregation of Pious Lay Works and later, in 1791, to the General Administration of Pious Lay Works. In the meantime, however, the hospital had been transferred in 1785 to the large seventeenth-century former Jesuit monastery (now Via Francesco Montanari).

On 23 December 1807, the new Congregation of Charity was founded, which ran the hospital and the "Desco dei poveri" until it was suppressed in 1937.

The hospital could only receive the sick from the city of Mirandola, while pilgrims could stay for up to three days. The maternity and expositions ward was set up in the former college and had the duty of receiving, treating, and looking after the insane, for whom three rooms were provided. The hospice (or conservatory) of the Exposed was abolished in 1823 and merged into a single building to house beggars as well. In 1844-1846 the construction of an asylum was begun, but then the ducal administration decided to send all the madmen to the San Lazzaro Frenocomio in Reggio Emilia.

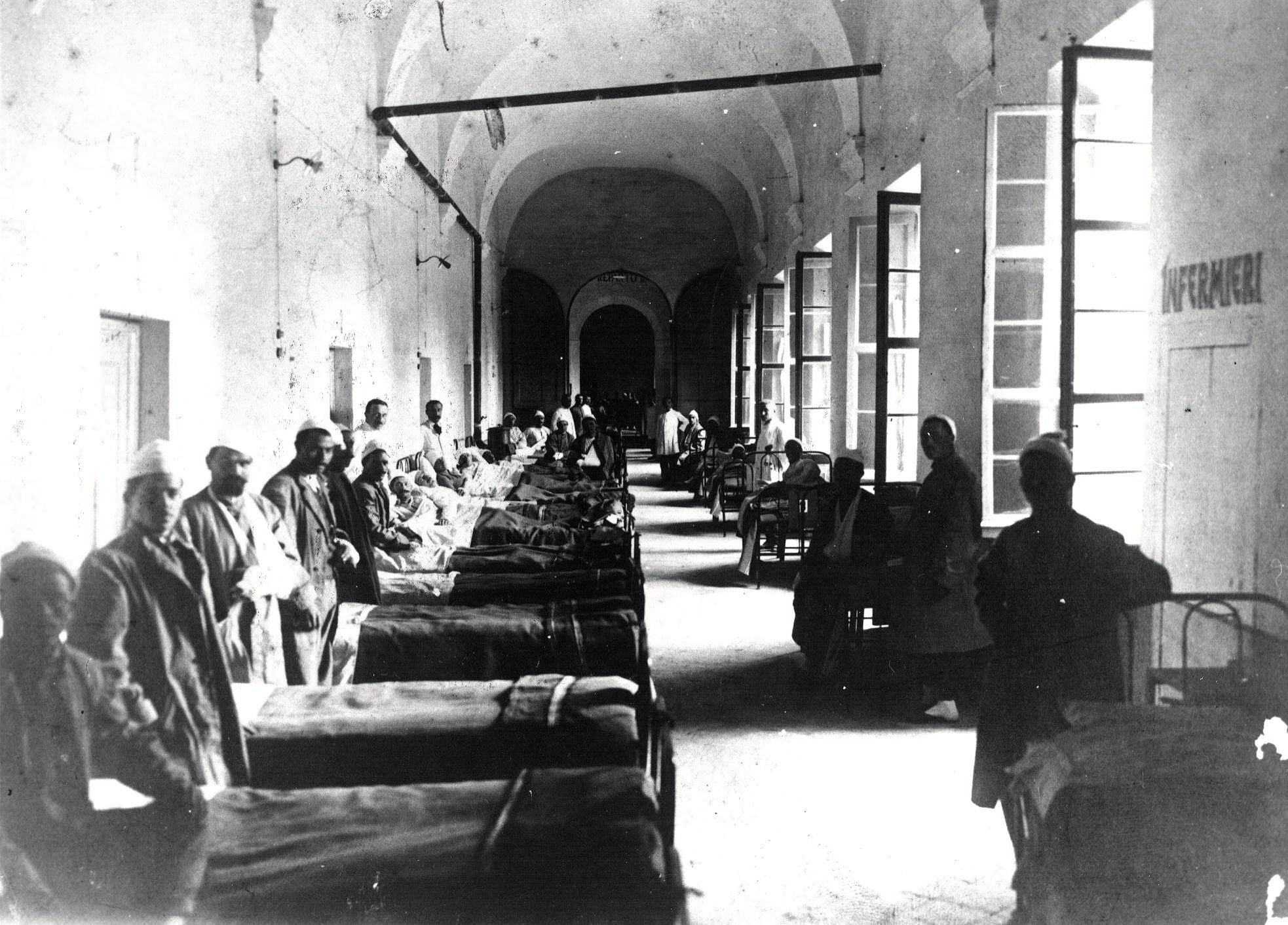
The territorial military hospital set up during the First World War in the former Jesuit college.

From 1859 to 1866, during the Third Italian War of Independence, the hospital treated many sick soldiers, either stationed there or passing through (at that time the nearby town of Poggio Rusco was still under Austrian rule of the Kingdom of Lombardy–Venetia and the front line was about ten kilometres north of Mirandola).

Around 1880, the mortuary was built, which was also used for autopsies.

In 1908 the hospital was finally moved to its present location outside the ring road, while the former Jesuit college was reused as an old people's home.

However, during the World War I, the former Jesuit college temporarily returned to being a territorial military hospital for the wounded from the Eastern Front, while during the World War II, it was used as a sanatorium.

Until the 1990s, the southern part of the former Jesuit college housed the administrative offices of Mirandola's Local Health Unit No. 15 and the psychiatric center.

=== The new hospital ===
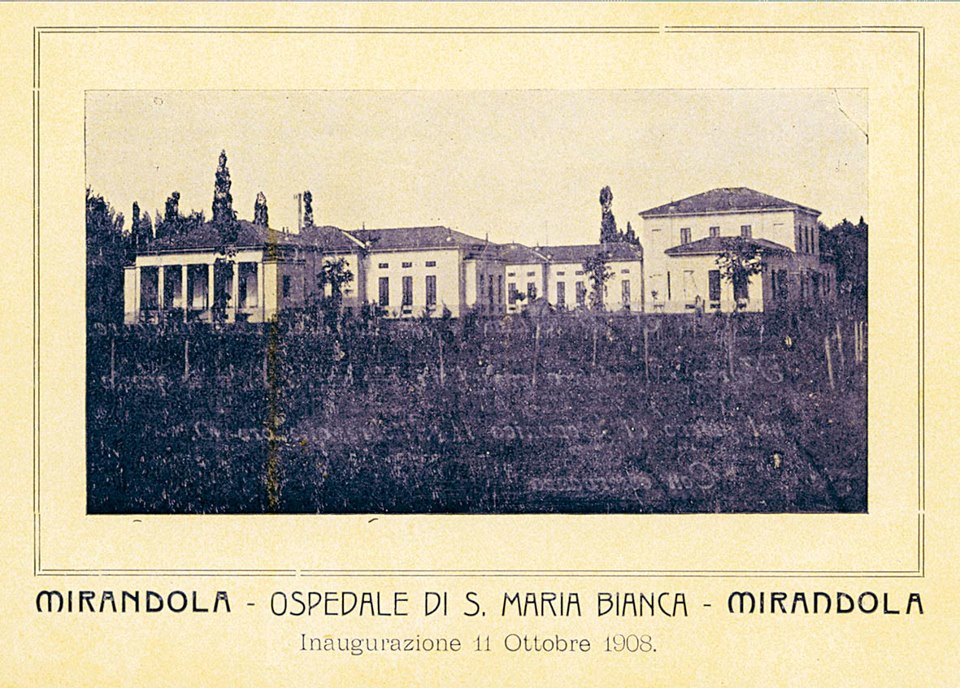
Inauguration of the new hospital (11 October 1908)

At the beginning of the 20th century, it was decided to build a new hospital, partly thanks to a large donation bequeathed by the engineer Pietro Tosatti (1846-1905), outside the former city walls.

The work was completed in less than two years and on 11 October 1908 the Santa Maria Bianca hospital was finally transferred to the new complex, in a large green area to the south-west of the city centre, where it still stands today.

The new hospital, designed by Giulio Marcovigi (1870-1937) and inaugurated in the presence of Minister Guido Baccelli, consisted only of the surgical pavilion and the medical pavilion (which was financed by Pietro Tosatti and where the well-known professor Mario Merighi, a thisiologist and later also elected to the Constituent Assembly, worked), while in 1917 the third ward was built for infectious diseases. As living conditions improved (thanks to modern vaccines, the new aqueduct and the completion of the Burana drainage), the third ward was handed over to the State in 1948 and in 1960 became the paediatrics department. In the 1970s the orthopaedics and physiatrics department was transferred to the 'Giuseppe Negrelli' civil hospital in Concordia sulla Secchia, which was then closed in the 1990s.

=== The single hospital in the Northern Modena area ===
After the closure of the neighbouring hospitals of Concordia sulla Secchia, San Felice sul Panaro and Finale Emilia, it was decided to concentrate the specialities of the hospitals that had been closed down in Mirandola, creating a new pavilion for the approximately 76,000 inhabitants of the Northern Modena area. To reduce costs, hospital capacity was reduced from 589 beds in 1982 to 447 in 1990 and 332 in 1993.

On 23 April 1994, after 18 months of work (costing a total of 20.3 billion lire at the time), the so-called Single Hospital of the Northern Modena area was inaugurated.

In 2008, the centenary of the premises in Via Fogazzaro was celebrated, with the naming of the new ward in memory of Francesco Scarlini, who was one of the founders of the local section of AVIS in the 1930s, head of medicine from 1955 to 1978 and then president of the decentralised section of the Nursing School until 1984. In particular, the Mirandola AVIS was founded in 1950 by Prof. Lino Smerieri, who directed the Surgical Department from 1954 to 1974. The Municipal Administration named the street leading to the current Emergency Department of the Hospital after him.

On 14 October 2011, the Local Implementation Plan (PAL) approved by the Territorial Social and Health Conference (CTSS) downgraded the Santa Maria Bianca hospital from an area hospital to a proximity hospital, ensuring medical and surgical activities of medium-low complexity, but entailing an overall reduction in the services offered and a reduction in beds and wards.

Following the 2012 Northern Italy earthquakes, the hospital suffered numerous damages to its structures, especially the modern ones (while the 1908 buildings suffered few injuries), for a total of 27,348,000 euro, which led already on the morning of 20 May 2012 to evacuate all the patients, who were then transferred to other hospitals in the area, and to build a large temporary field hospital in the parking in front of it. The following 25 June, the Concert for Emilia was held to raise funds for the reconstruction of the Bernardino Ramazzini hospital in Carpi and the Santa Maria Bianca hospital in Mirandola. In the following months, the hospital departments were gradually reactivated, despite the limitations and cuts imposed by the 2011-2013 PAL.

In this regard, on 13 December 2015, the first consultative referendum in Italy was held against cuts in healthcare spending: the citizens of Mirandola were asked for their opinion on the launch of "a participatory process to assess the possibility of making the Mirandola hospital operational again, as it was before the 2012 earthquake". Despite a result of 99.05% in favour, the turnout stopped at 44% and the necessary quorum was not reached.

== Facilities ==
The Mirandola hospital occupies an area of approximately 39,000 m² with 19 buildings, almost all of which are connected to each other according to the block system, which has replaced the system of separate pavilions.

Before the 2012 Emilia earthquake, there were 165 beds.

In 2014, 5,973 people were admitted to the Mirandola hospital, which had 130 beds available, with an average length of stay of around 7.6 days (a total of 37,000 days), while around 24,000 people were admitted to the emergency department. In the same year, 450 babies were born (with an average of 21% caesarean sections) and 1,954 surgical operations were performed, while there were 845 employees.

According to the current Local Health Implementation Plan (PAL) the capacity will be increased to 167 beds

In 2017, Mirandola Hospital is organised into three operating units

Medical area

- Internal Medicine
- Pneumology
- Cardiology
- Polyspecialist Semi-Intensive Care
- Long-term care
- Oncology day-hospital

Surgical area

- General surgery
- Gynaecology
- Orthopaedics

Maternal and child area

- Obstetrics
- Paediatrics

The hospital also offers the following:

- specialist outpatient clinics
- Emergency Room
- Radiology
- Digestive endoscopy
- Bronchoscopy
- Cytopathology Laboratory
- Hemodialysis
- Physiatry and Rehabilitation
- Two operating compartments
- Sterilisation Centre
- Day Care Area

== Bibliography ==
- Vilmo Cappi (1975). "L'ospedale di Santa Maria Bianca della Mirandola". X. X. Modena: Aedes Muratoriana: 51–61.
- Francesco Molinari (2014) [1882]. Gli Istituti Pii della Città e dell'antico Ducato della Mirandola. Memorie storiche della città e dell'antico ducato della Mirandola. Vol. 5. Mirandola: Tipografia di Gaetano Cagarelli.
- Sergio Poletti (April 1994). Servizio Sanitario Nazionale - Regione Emilia-Romagna (ed.). Cenni storici sui nosocomi della Bassa. Mirandola: Cassa di risparmio di Mirandola. Archived from the original on 18 April 2018.
- Servizio Sanitario Nazionale - Regione Emilia-Romagna, ed. (April 1994). L'ospedale unico della bassa modenese: attualità e storia. Mirandola: Cassa di risparmio di Mirandola. Archived from the original on 18 April 2018.

== See also ==
- Mirandola Biomedical District
