= Duchy of Mirandola =

Historical Italian state centered in modern-day Mirandola, Italy

Coordinates: 44°53′N 11°04′E

Duchy of Mirandola Ducato della Mirandola (Italian)
- 1310–1711
- Coat of arms

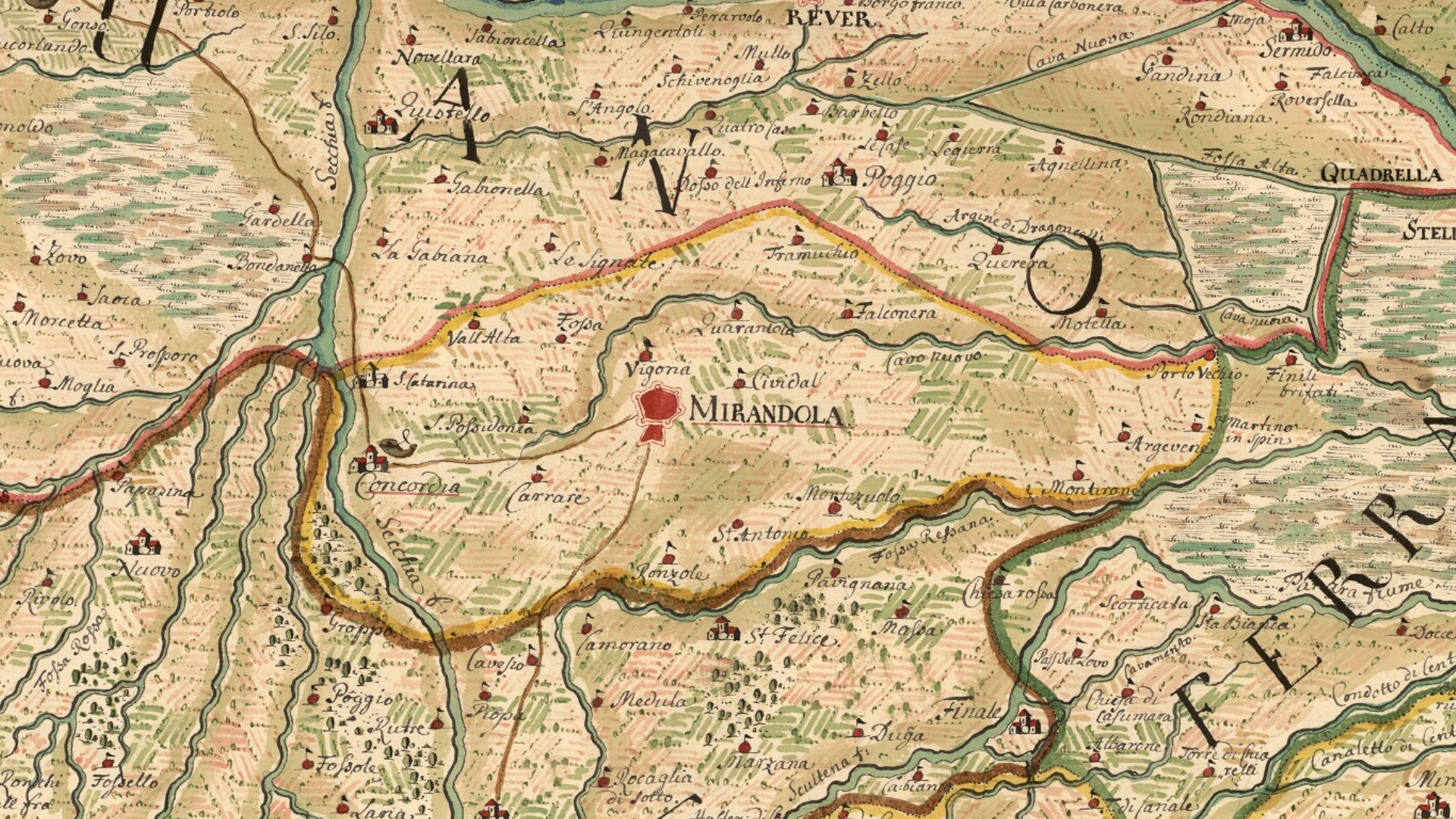
- The Duchy of Mirandola during the first half of the 18th century.
- Capital: Mirandola
- Common languages: Official language: Latin; Italian; other languages: Emilian dialects
- Religion: Roman Catholicism
- Government: Absolute monarchy
- Lord, Count and Duke
  - 1311–1321: Francesco I Pico (first lord)
  - 1691–1708: Francesco Maria Pico della Mirandola (last duke)
- History
  - Established: 1310
  - Disestablished: 1711
- Currency: Moneta di Mirandola (from 1510)
| Preceded by | Succeeded by |
| Kingdom of Italy (Holy Roman Empire) | Duchy of Modena and Reggio |

The Lordship, then County, Principality and finally Duchy of Mirandola (Italian: Ducato della Mirandola) was a state which existed in Northern Italy from 1310 until 1711, centered in Mirandola in what is now the province of Modena, in Emilia-Romagna, and ruled by the House of Pico.

== History ==
The House of Pico della Mirandola were a noble family first known for one Hugh, a vassal of Matilda of Tuscany in the 11th century. In the following centuries, members of the family were podestà in Modena and Reggio Emilia, until, in 1311, Francesco Pico received from Emperor Henry VII the fiefs of Quarantoli and San Possidonio in reward of his help during the war against the Este. In 1353 Paolo Pico obtained from the bishops of Reggio the fief of San Martino Spino, and in the following year Emperor Charles IV freed the Pico from the dominance of the bishops, placing Mirandola directly under imperial suzerainty.

In 1432 Giovanni Pico received from Emperor Sigismund the title of Count of Concordia. The city was strongly fortified, and, in the course of the Italian Wars, it was allied with France. It was besieged two times by Papal troops under Pope Julius II (1511), who personally attacked its walls, and Pope Julius III (1551–1552). In the second occasion, the fortress resisted successfully under the command of Ludovico Pico and Piero Strozzi. In 1597, after returning under the imperial umbrella, Mirandola obtained the title of city and the Picos were named Princes of Mirandola and Marquesses of Concordia. In 1617 Alessandro I was finally declared duke.

The main economic activities in Renaissance times were animal husbandry, agriculture and, starting from the 17th century, silk clothes. The duchy however suffered from internal crisis and the numerous military operations in the area, such as in 1630 when it was ravaged by the imperial troops.

The last lord was Francesco Maria Pico, who was charged with treason after having been forced to cede the fortress to the French. The duchy was acquired by the Duchy of Modena under the House of Este, who bought it for 175,000 golden doppie.

== List of rulers ==
=== Lords of Mirandola ===
1. 1311 - 1311: Francesco I

=== Lords of Mirandola and Concordia ===
1. 1354 - 1399: Francesco II
2. 1399 - 1429: Francesco III with Giovanni I and Aiace Pico
3. 1429 - 1432: Francesco III with Giovanni I

=== Lords of Mirandola, Counts of Concordia ===
1. 1432 - 1451: Francesco III with Giovanni I
2. 1451 - 1461: Francesco III
3. 1461 - 1467: Gianfrancesco I
4. 1467 - 1499: Galeotto I (brother of philosopher Giovanni Pico della Mirandola)
5. 1499 - 1502: Gianfrancesco II
6. 1502 - 1504: Federico I with Ludovico I
7. 1504 - 1509: Ludovico I
8. 1509 - 1511: Galeotto II
9. 1511 - 1511: Gianfrancesco II
10. 1514 - 1533: Galeotto II

=== Counts of Mirandola and Concordia ===
1. 1533 - 1550: Galeotto II
2. 1550 - 1558: Ludovico II
3. 1568 - 1592: Galeotto III
4. 1592 - 1596: Federico II

=== Princes of Mirandola, Marquises of Concordia ===
1. 1596 - 1602: Federico II
2. 1602 - 1619: Alessandro I

=== Dukes of Mirandola, Marquises of Concordia ===
1. 1619 - 1637: Alessandro I
2. 1637 - 1691: Alessandro II
3. 1691 - 1708: Francesco Maria

== See also ==
- Mirandola Mint
