= Giovanni Francesco Pico della Mirandola =

Italian nobleman and philosopher (1470–1533)

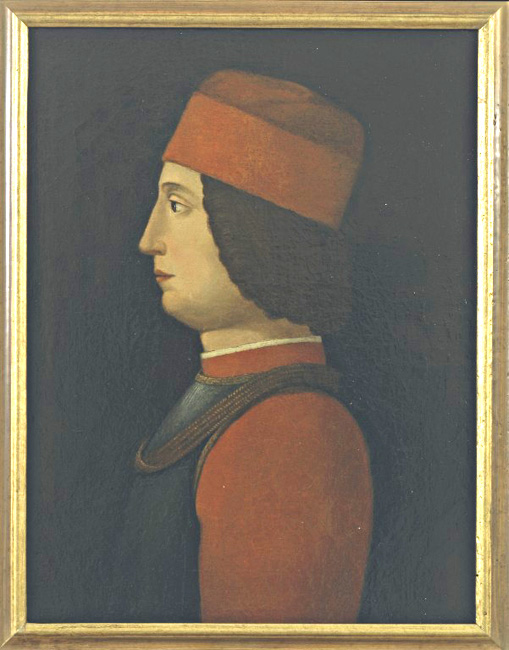
Giovanni Francesco II Pico della Mirandola

Giovanni Francesco Pico della Mirandola (1470–1533) was an Italian nobleman and philosopher, the nephew of Giovanni Pico della Mirandola. His name is typically truncated as Gianfrancesco Pico della Mirandola.

== Biography ==
Gianfrancesco was the son of Galeotto I Pico, lord of Mirandola, and Bianca Maria d'Este, the daughter of Niccolò III d'Este.

Like his uncle he devoted himself chiefly to philosophy, but made it subject to the Bible, though in his treatises, De studio divinæ et humanæ sapientiæ and particularly in the six books entitled Examen doctrinæ vanitatis gentium, he depreciates the authority of the philosophers, above all of Aristotle. He wrote a detailed biography of his uncle, published in 1496, and another of Girolamo Savonarola, of whom he was a follower.

Having observed the dangers to which Italian society was exposed at the time, he sounded a warning on the occasion of the Lateran Council: Joannis Francisci Pici oratio ad Leonem X et concilium Lateranense de reformandis Ecclesiæ Moribus (Hagenau, 1512, dedicated to Willibald Pirckheimer).

He died at Mirandola in 1533, assassinated by his nephew Galeotto, along with his youngest son, Alessandro. His other son Giantommaso was ambassador to Pope Clement VII. Charles B. Schmitt wrote:

Whereas Giovanni Pico had often argued that all philosophies and all religions have attained a portion of the truth, Gianfrancesco said, in effect, that all religions and all philosophies – save the Christian religion alone – are mere collections of confused and internally inconsistent falsehoods. In holding such a view, he sided not only with Savonarola, but with certain of the Fathers and with the Reformers as well. On this point, he was insistent. Christianity is a self-subsistent reality and it has little if anything to gain from philosophy, the sciences and the arts. This central thesis diffuses itself through nearly the whole of Gianfrancesco’s literary output. He writes not to praise or extend the realm of philosophy but to demolish it.

== See also ==
- Piagnoni

== Selected works ==
- De studio divinae et humanae philosophiae (1496)
- Ioannis Pici Mirandulae Vita (1496)
- De imaginatione (1501)
- De providentia Dei (1508)
- De rerum praenotione (1506–1507)
- Quaestio de falsitate astrologiae (ca. 1510)
- Examen vanitatis doctrinae gentium, et veritatis Christianae disciplinae (1520)
- Strix sive de Ludificatione Daemonum (1523; translated into Italian in 1524)
- Opera Omnia (1573)

== Sources ==
- Herbermann, Charles, ed. (1913). "Giovanni Francesco Pico della Mirandola" . Catholic Encyclopedia. New York: Robert Appleton Company.
- Burke, Peter. (1977). "Witchcraft and Magic in Renaissance Italy: Gianfrancesco Pico and His Strix," in Sydney Anglod, ed. The Damned Art: Essays in the Literature of Witchcraft, pp. 32–48. London.
- Herzig, T. (2003). "The Demons' Reaction to Sodomy: Witchcraft and Homosexuality in Gianfrancesco Pico della Mirandola's Strix." The Sixteenth Century Journal, 34, 1, 53.
- Kors, Alan Charles and Edward Peters. (2001) Witchcraft in Europe, 400-1700: A Documentary History. Philadelphia: University of Pennsylvania Press (Excerpts from the Pico's Strix, pp. 239–44)
- Schmitt, C. B. (1967). Gianfrancesco Pico della Mirandola (1469-1533) and his critique of Aristotle. The Hague: Martinus Nijhoff.
- Pappalardo, L. (2015). "Gianfrancesco Pico della Mirandola: fede, immaginazione e scetticismo" (Nutrix, 8), Turnhout: Brepols Publishers.
