= Gianfrancesco I Pico =

Italian condottiero (1415–1467)

Gianfrancesco I Pico (1415 – 8 November 1467) was an Italian condottiero and nobleman, the father to philosopher Giovanni Pico della Mirandola.

He was the son of Giovanni I Pico, lord of Mirandola in what is now Emilia Romagna, and Caterina Bevilacqua, a Veronese noblewoman. When his father died in 1450, Gianfrancesco succeeded him in Mirandola and, in the same year, he fought alongside Sigismondo Pandolfo Malatesta, lord of Rimini, who was then under attack of Pope Pius II's troops. In 1462 he was captured by Federico II da Montefeltro, remaining his prisoner until the Venetians paid a ransom the following year.

After his death, in 1467, the members of the Pico family started a feud on the family's land which lasted some one hundred years.

== Sources ==
- Litta, Pompeo (1835). "Pico della Mirandola". Famiglie celebri di Italia. Turin.
