= Galeotto II Pico della Mirandola =

Italian condottiero (1508–1550)

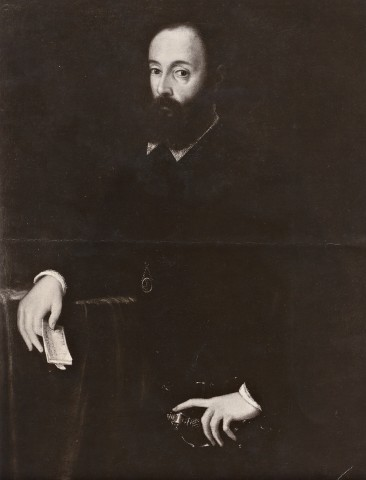
Galeotto II

Galeotto II Pico della Mirandola, lord of Mirandola (Mirandola, 1508 – Paris, 20 November 1550), was an Italian condottiere.

He was the son of Ludovico I Pico, who died in 1509 and Francesca Trivulzio and grew up under the tutelage of his mother, who ruled the state in his name until 1511. He learned from it the hatred of his uncle Gianfrancesco II Pico, lord of Mirandola. In 1533 he entered the castle and murdered his uncle, taking power. Then Emperor Charles V sent his commissioners to Mirandola, inviting Galeotto to hand over the State, but he refused and was therefore sentenced to death. But not even the sending of the general Antonio de Leyva succeeded in moving Galeotto.

He then placed himself in 1536, under the protection of Francis I, sending his children to the French court. In the Italian War of 1536–38, when the war between the French and Charles V rekindled, Galeotto participated in Piedmont in the maneuvers against the imperials.

He died in Paris in 1550.

He was the father of Silvia Pico della Mirandola and Fulvia Pico della Mirandola, who married the brothers François III de La Rochefoucauld, Prince of Marcillac, Count of Roucy and Baron of Verteuil, and Charles de La Rochefoucauld, Comte de Randan, in a double marriage of siblings.

== Bibliography ==
- Felice Ceretti (1882). Il Conte Galeotto II Pico: memorie, etc (in Italian). Modena: Vincenzi.
- Litta Biumi, Pompeo (1853). Famiglie celebri di Italia. Pico della Mirandola (in Italian). Milano: Luciano Basadonna Editore.
