= Siege of Mirandola =

The siege of Mirandola may refer to:

- Siege of Mirandola (1321), by Francesco Bonaccolsi (son of Passerino Bonaccolsi)
- Siege of Mirandola (1355), by the Visconti of Milan
- Siege of Mirandola (1502), by Ludovico Pico and Francesco I Pico, with Ercole I d'Este and Francesco Gonzaga
- Siege of Mirandola (1511), by Pope Julius II
- Siege of Mirandola (1517), by Camillo Trivulzio
- Siege of Mirandola (1536), by Imperial army
- Siege of Mirandola (1551), by army of Pope Julius III
- Siege of Mirandola (1705), by French army (part of War of the Spanish Succession)
- Siege of Mirandola (1734), by French army (part of War of the Polish Succession)
- Siege of Mirandola (1735), by Spanish army (part of War of the Polish Succession)
- Siege of Mirandola (1742), by Austro-Sardinian army (part of War of the Austrian Succession)
- Siege of Mirandola (1796), by Napoleon
- Siege of Mirandola (1799), by Mantuans
