= Francesco II Pico della Mirandola =

- Lord of Mirandola
- Coat of arms
- Other titles: Lord of Concordia
- Born: Unknown
- Died: 1399
- Noble family: Pico della Mirandola
- Father: Paolo Pico della Mirandola
- Mother: Isabella Malaspina

Francesco II Pico della Mirandola (... - 1399) was an Italian condottiero and nobleman, belonging to the House of Pico, who in 1354 regained the family domains of Mirandola and Concordia, which had fallen into the hands of the Gonzagas, and was lord of them until his death (1399).

== Life ==
He was son of Paolo Pico della Mirandola (?-1354) and Isabella Malaspina, daughter of Marquis Azzolino Malaspina.

With the coming of the Emperor Charles IV in Italy, Francesco regained the dominion of Mirandola on 23 December 1354: first of all, an imperial decision ended the ancient disputes of jurisdiction over the Courts of Quarantoli and San Possidonio and on the castle of Mirandola, which were not included in the territory of Reggio Emilia, but immediately subject to the Holy Roman Empire; furthermore, Emperor Charles V renewed to Francesco and his cousins the investiture already granted to their ancestors by the previous Emperor Henry VII. The Gonzagaswho had held possession of Mirandola since 1322 following the siege of Duke Passerino, had to return the city to the Pico family. In 1355, at the outbreak of the war between the Estensi and the Visconti, Francesco openly sided with the latter after the siege of Mirandola by Bernabò Visconti. In 1358, when peace was reached, Francesco Pico returned to Estensi the occupied castles of Marano and Campiglio (Vignola), then went to Modena to pay homage to Marquis Aldovrandino d'Este. In 1362 the war was rekindled in which Francesco Pico renewed his alliance with the Visconti; therefore the League decided that in the event of victory Mirandola would be returned to the Gonzaga. In 1363, Francesco Pico was forced to surrender to the Mantuans, joining the Guelph League and accepting a garrison from it: for this reason, Bernabò Visconti had to accept the peace concluded in 1364. In 1370, the war flared up again, but Francesco remained loyal to the Guelph League, while his cousins sided with the Visconti and so ended up moving away from Mirandola, until they were gradually excluded from its dominion: in 1390 they claimed claims, but only obtained a life pension: a council of 13 judges met in the church of San Francesco to settle the dispute over the dominion of Mirandola that had arisen between the four brothers Spinetta, Francesco II, Prendiparte and Tommasino (sons of Paolo Pico) against their cousins Giovanni and Prendiparte (sons of Niccolò Pico della Mirandola).

== See also ==
- Castle of the Pico
- Duchy of Mirandola
- Siege of Mirandola (1355)

== Bibliography ==
- Litta, Pompeo (1835). Famiglie celebri di Italia. Pico della Mirandola. Turin. p. 3.
