= Our Lady of the Snows, Quarantoli =

Church in Emilia Romagna, Italy

Parish church of Our Lady of the Snows
- Pieve di Santa Maria delle Nevi
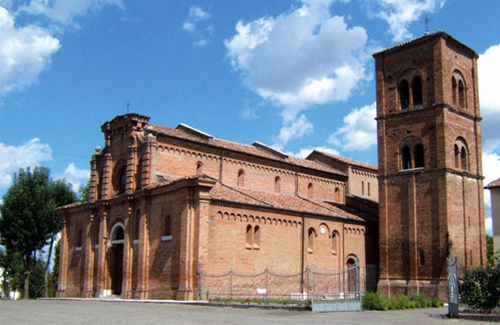

Religion
- Affiliation: Roman Catholic
- Diocese: Quarantoli
- Province: Province of Modena
- Region: Emilia-Romagna
- Ecclesiastical or organizational status: church
- Patron: Our Lady of the Snows
- Status: abandoned

Location
- Municipality: Mirandola
- Country: Italy
- Interactive map of Parish church of Our Lady of the Snows
- Coordinates: 44.92312°N 11.09586°E

Architecture
- Demolished: 2012
- Direction of façade: West

The pieve of Our Lady of the Snows (in Italian: pieve di Santa Maria della Neve) is a Romanesque church located in Quarantoli, village near Mirandola, in the province of Modena and Roman Catholic Diocese of Carpi.

== History ==
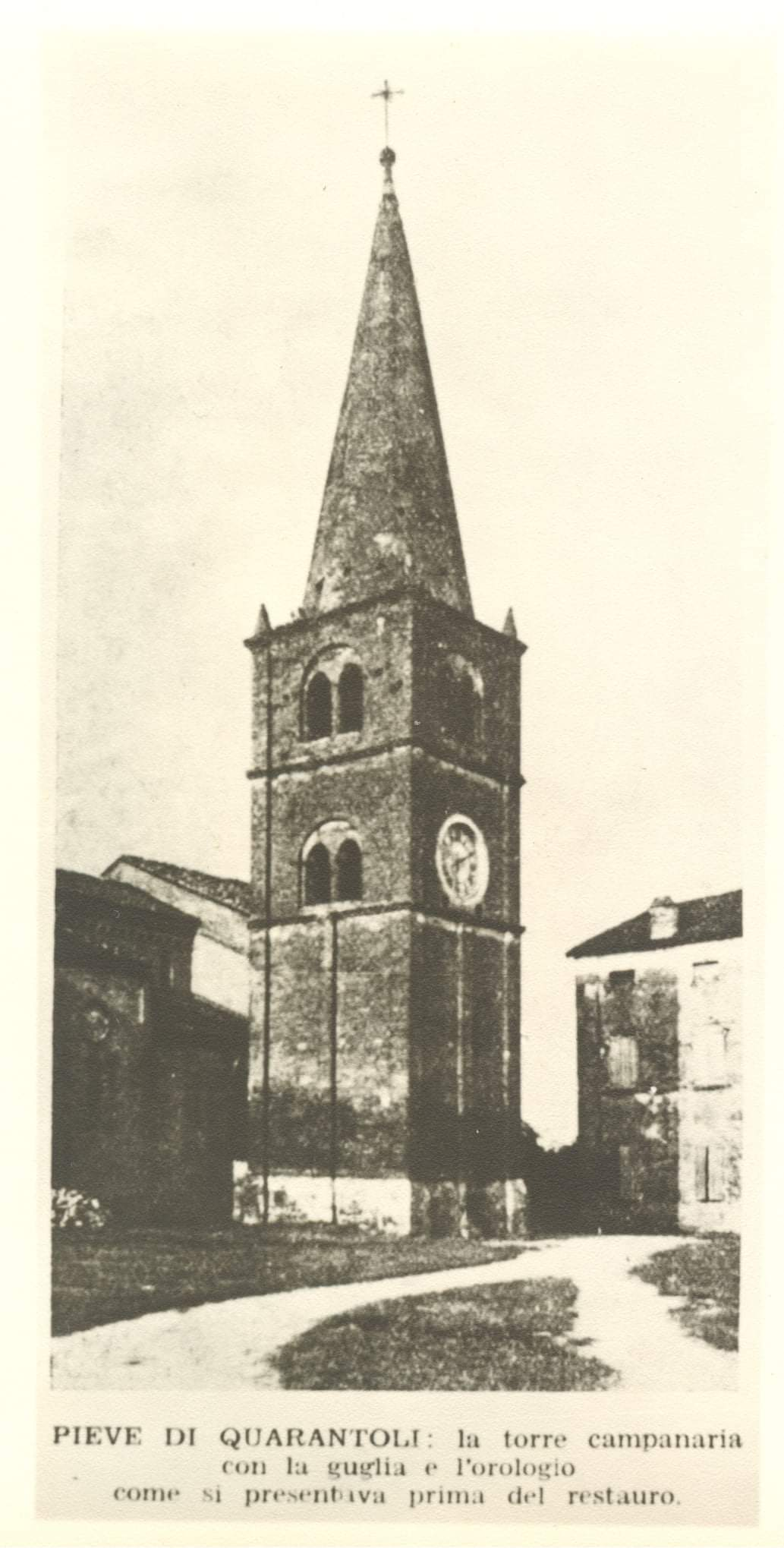
The bell tower with spire and clock before 1922 restoration

Already existing in the 9th century during the feud of Ugo di Maginfredo, the presence of the parish church is attested in a historical document of 1044, which mentions the important cultural and religious nucleus of Quarantoli, like the abbey of Nonantola. The church was completely rebuilt in the 12th century by Matilde di Canossa.

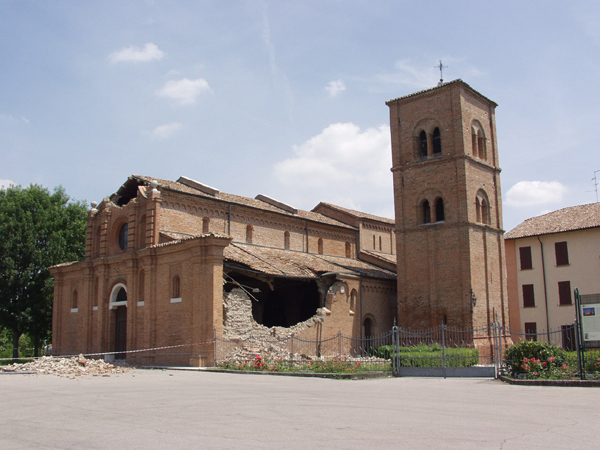
The church after the 2012 earthquake

The altar bears the date 15 November 1114, when the consecration of the parish church took place.

In the 15th century there were some restorations and the bell tower was built.

Around 1670, the façade was rebuilt in Baroque style.

In 1821 the parish of Quarantoli passed from the diocese of Reggio Emilia to that of Carpi.

In 1915, numerous works were carried out to enhance the Romanesque origins, which also doubled the length of the naves, to which a presbytery surrounded by an ambulatory was added.

In May 2012 the church was severely damaged by the Emilia earthquake: the wall of the left aisle collapsed, the façade is unsafe and the whole church is unfit for use.

== Architecture ==
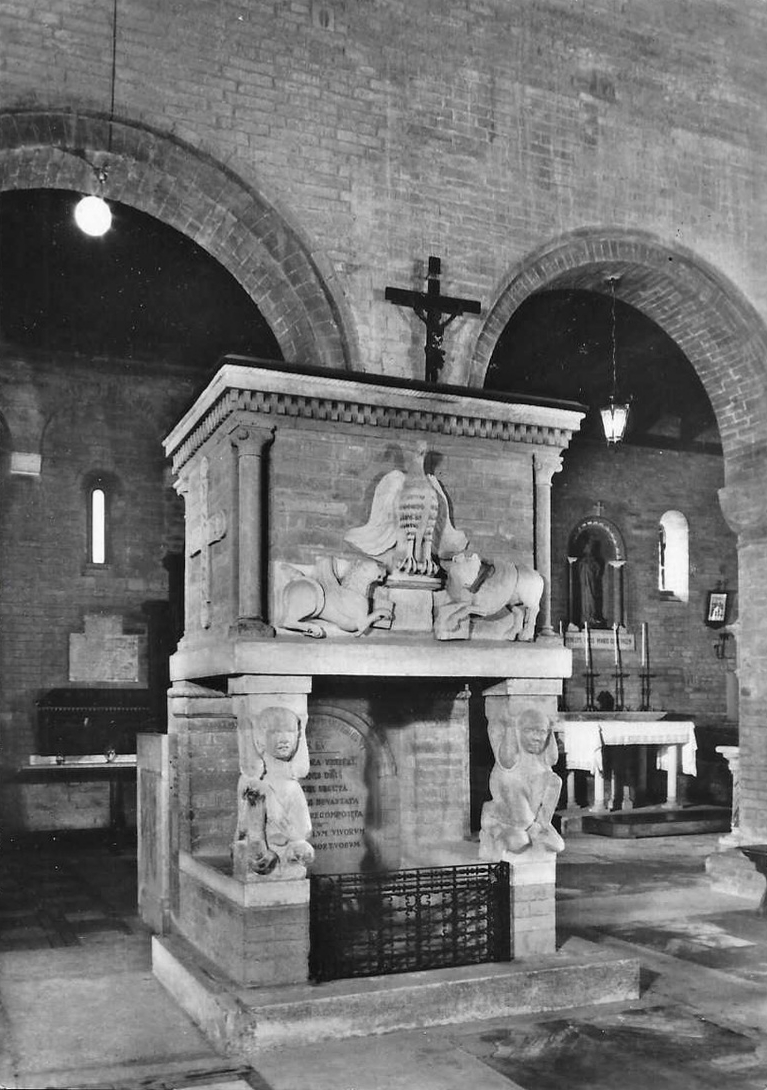
Pulpit (Wiligelmo circle, 12th century)

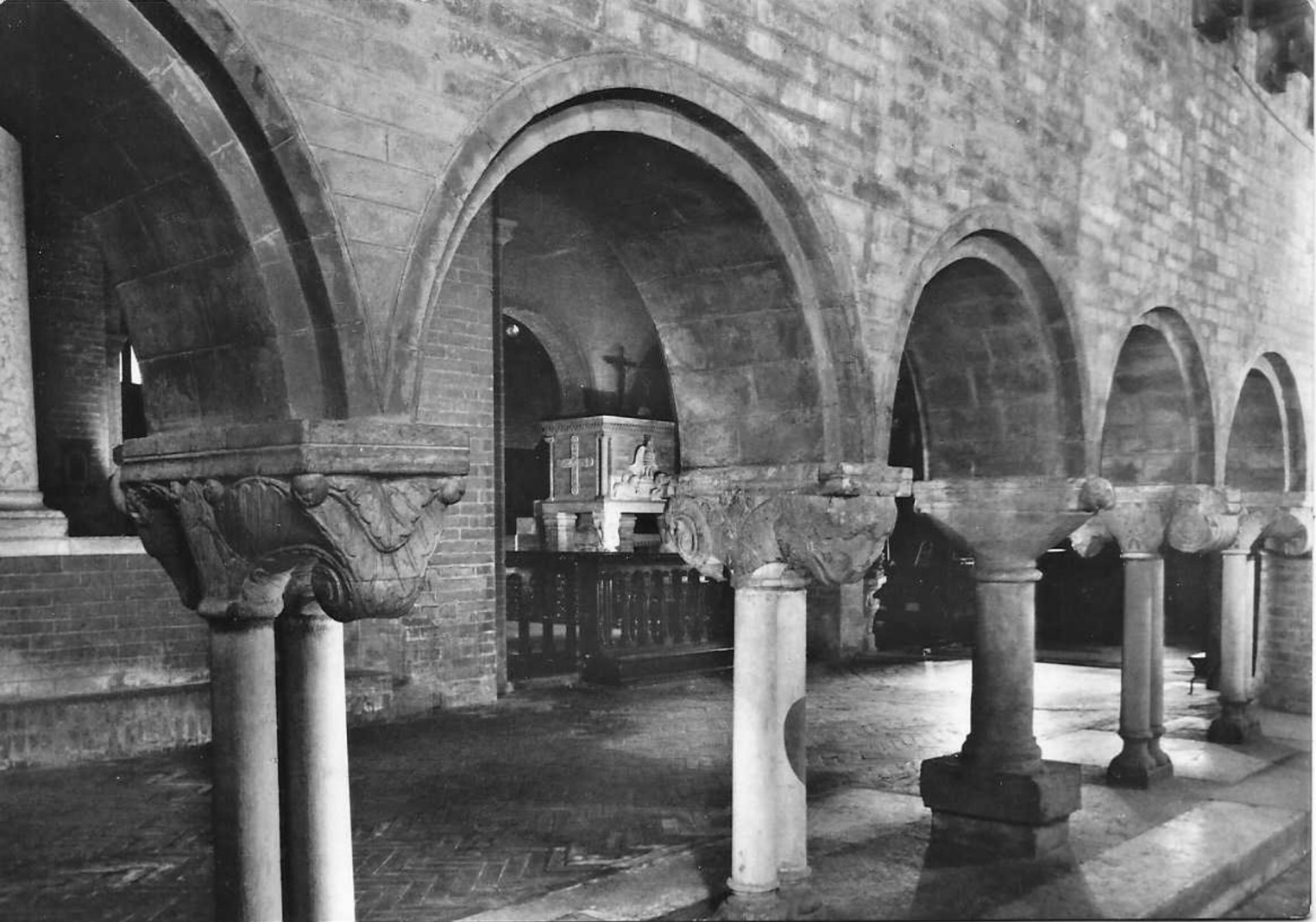
Interior

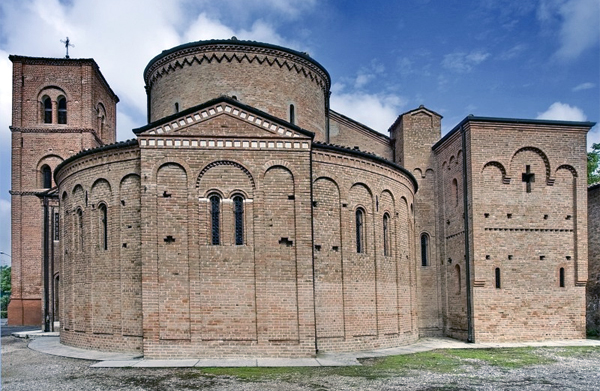
Back side of the parish church

The original structure of the Romanesque building, with a basilica plan, consists of aisles ending in three apses that are divided into five bays of segmental arches resting on bilobed pillars.

On the south side of the nave there is a reconstructed pulpit containing some 12th-13th century Romanesque sculptures depicting the symbols of the Four Evangelists: on the front side of the pulpit there is a lion (St Mark), a bull (St Luke) and an eagle (St John), while on the right side there is an effigy of St Matthew. These ancient sculptures are attributed to the circle of Wiligelmo (who also created the cathedral of Modena and its decorations). The pulpit is then supported by two stone telamons representing respectively a young man and an old man kneeling and suffering.

On the left side of the presbytery there is a loggia rebuilt in recent times by reusing columns and capitals originally used in an ancient cloister that no longer exists. The capitals, each one different from the others, are carved with different themes, such as animals, leaves, lions and horned anthropomorphic heads.

The baptismal chapel is decorated with a scagliola antependium of the Carpi school from 1686 and a 16th-century Madonna and Child of the Venetian-Cretan school.

The altar is made of a pair of elegant late-Romanesque pillars of the Modena school, one surmounted by a sculpted cubic capital with sloping foliage and the other sculpted in a bundle of knotted columns with a volute capital, supporting the mensa.

== See also ==
- Quarantoli
- Our Lady of the Snows

== Bibliography ==
- La pieve di Quarantoli. Modena: Ente Provinciale del Turismo. 1972.
- Bruno Andreolli, ed. (1992). Quarantoli e la sua pieve nel Medioevo: atti della Giornata di studio, domenica 28 ottobre 1990. San Felice sul Panaro.
- S. Stocchi (1984). "La pieve di Quarantoli". Milano.
- Bruno Andreolli, ed. (2016). Pieve di Quarantoli 1114-2014: nove secoli per una rinascita. Gruppo Studi Bassa Modenese. ISBN 978-88-98167-17-3.
- Mauro Calzolari, ed. (1996). Il Canonico Don Alberto Fedozzi e la Pieve di Quarantoli: studi e ricerche. Gruppo Studi Bassa Modenese. p. 183.
- Bruno Andreolli (2012). "Serendipità e ricerca storica. Nuovi dati sulla pieve di Quarantoli, sulla Falconiera e su don Felice Ceretti". 61: 63–68.
- Pierpaolo Bonacini (1991). "Quarantoli e la sua pieve nel medioevo. Giornata di studio, Quarantoli 28 ottobre 1990". 19: 87–90.
- Alberto Calciolari (2013). "La pieve di Quarantoli. La chiesa di San Francesco e la Città della Fenice negli scritti di Giovanni Cavicchioli". 64: 115–124.
- Francesca Foroni (2013). "L'edificio romano presso la Pieve di Quarantoli (Mirandola)". 63: 7–24.
