= Siege of Mirandola (1355) =

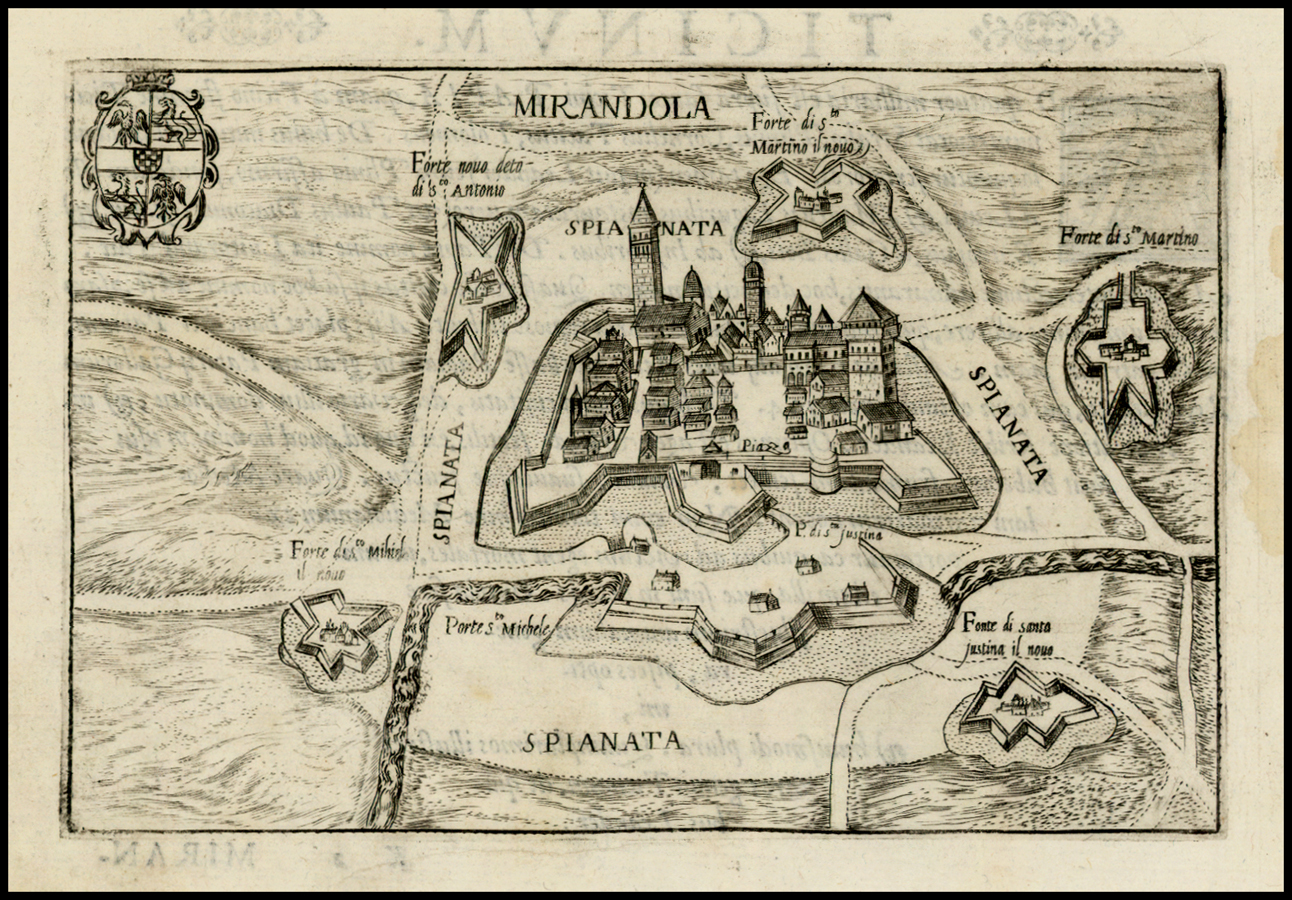
- Mirandola
Date	1355
Location	Mirandola
Result	victory of Visconti

Belligerents
Lordship of Mirandola	Lordship of Milan

Commanders and leaders
Francesco II Pico	Bernabò Visconti

Strength
Unknown	1,500 knights 1,500 masnadiers

The siege of Mirandola in 1355, was a military conflict involving Francesco II Pico, first lord of Mirandola, against Bernabò Visconti.

== History ==
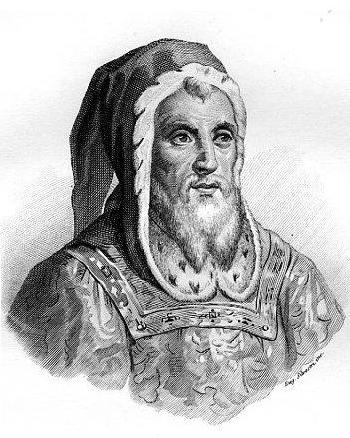
Bernabò Visconti

War broke out between the Estensi (guelfs) and the Visconti (ghibellins), and the latter besieged Mirandola in early December 1355, with an army of 1,500 horsemen and many masnadiers, who raided the surrounding territory and San Felice sul Panaro.

In the obvious impossibility of resisting such an enemy force, Francesco II Pico, wishing to maintain the dominion of the Pico family over Mirandola and the court of Quarantoli (reacquired just the previous year, taking it away from the Gonzagas, thanks to the investiture by the Emperor Charles IV, who had arrived in Italy) was forced to surrender and ally himself with the Visconti, whose troops were let into the castle of Mirandola in a friendly manner.

Once the siege of Mirandola was over, Francesco II Pico was appointed by Bernabò Visconti as his podestà in Bologna (at the time ruled by Lord Giovanni Visconti da Oleggio) and fought alongside the Visconti against the anti-Milanese league, later occupying the castles of Marano sul Panaro and Campiglio (Vignola). Peace was concluded in 1358 and Francesco II Pico returned the two occupied castles to the Este family, then went to Modena to make peace in person with Marquis Aldobrandino III d'Este.

However, as early as 1362, the war between the Viscontis and the Este family broke out again: the Pico family renewed their loyalty to the Viscontis, while Niccolò II d'Este allied himself with the Carraresi of Padua, the Gonzaga of Mantua and Cardinal Egidio Albornoz of the Papal Legate of Romagna with the agreement that if the fortress of Mirandola was conquered, it would be handed over to the Mantuans.

Having defeated Bernabò Visconti, the Pico family had no choice but to ask the podestà and captain of Parma for help and, in the meantime, let the troops of the anti-Visconti league enter their castle. This was followed by a drinkable truce and then a new war by Bernabò Visconti (this time allied with the Pio di Carpi).

On 10 January 1364 Mirandola was again attacked and burnt by soldiers of the Antimilanese League; a new peace was stipulated on 3 March 1364. In October 1370, the Milanese led by the English condottiere John Hawkwood severely defeated the anti-Viscontean league led by Count Lucio di Landau again in Mirandola, and then signed a new peace treaty the following month.

There followed further decades of bitter clashes between the Visconti and the Estensi, with the members of the House of Pico divided into two factions: on the one side Niccolò Pico (with his sons Giovanni, Franceschino, and Prendiparte) and on the other Francesco II Pico, whose descendants retained ownership of the Lordship of Mirandola.

== See also ==
- Bernabò Visconti
- Castle of the Pico
- Duchy of Mirandola
