= Knotted column =

Architectural element

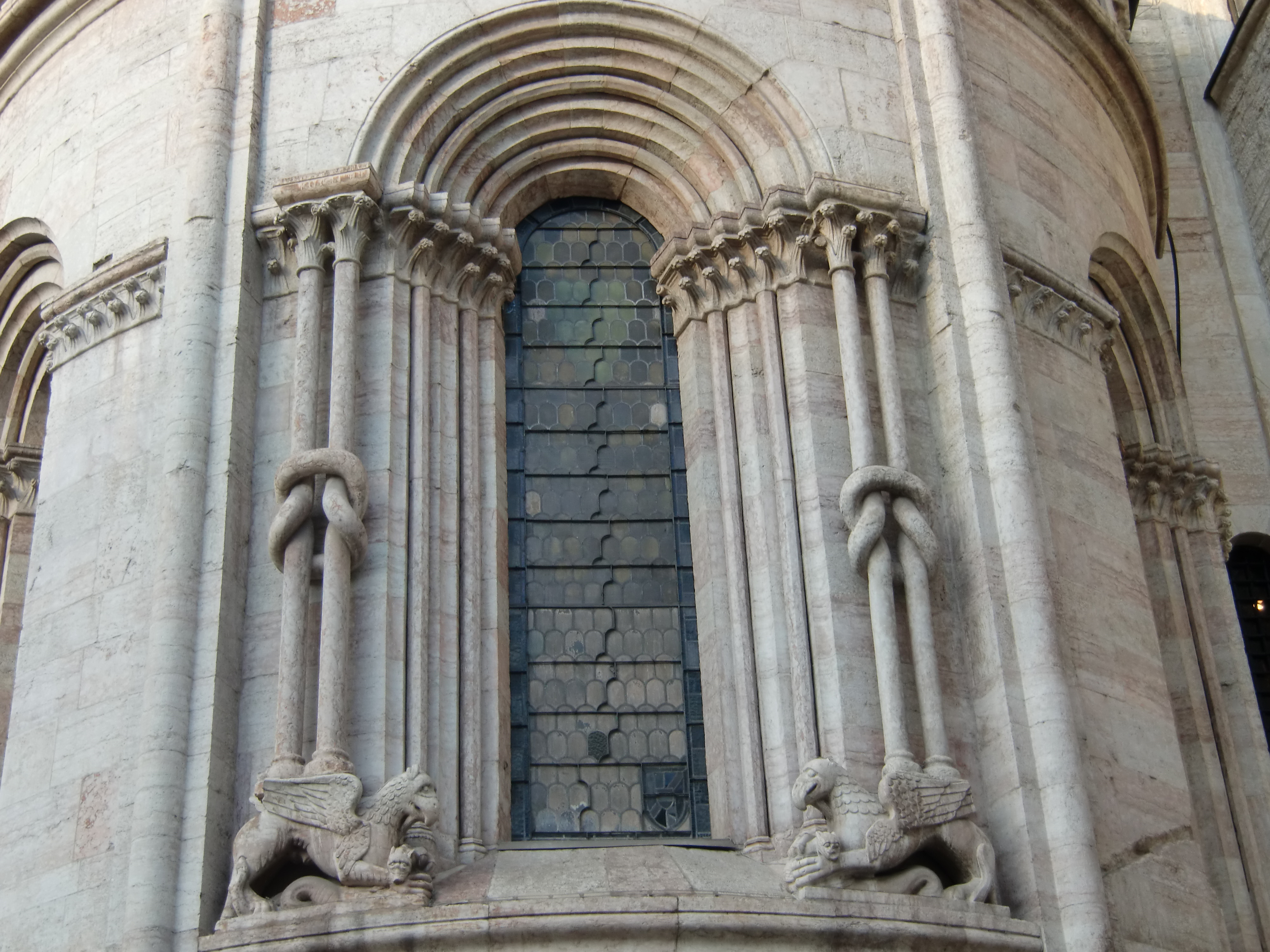
Trento Cathedral, a window of the apse.

Knotted column (also serpent column) is an architectural element, consisting of a pair of columns joined together by a "flat knot". The column was particularly used during the Romanesque period when it spread in a wide geographical area between Northern Italy, Bavaria, and Burgundy, and was particularly associated with the work of the Comacine masters and the Cistercian order.

== Background ==
The knot is a symbol of the double human and divine nature of Christ, as well as of the Father and the Son united by the Holy Spirit.

One of the oldest examples can be considered the pulpit of the parish church of San Pietro di Gropina, perhaps from the Lombards era. One of its supports is made up of a pair of knotted columns. There are also examples in which four columns are knotted together, as in the Trento Cathedral.

According to some scholars, however, the origin of the knotted column would be Byzantine, as evidenced by a column found and exhibited at the Provincial Museum of Torcello (Venice).

== Gallery ==
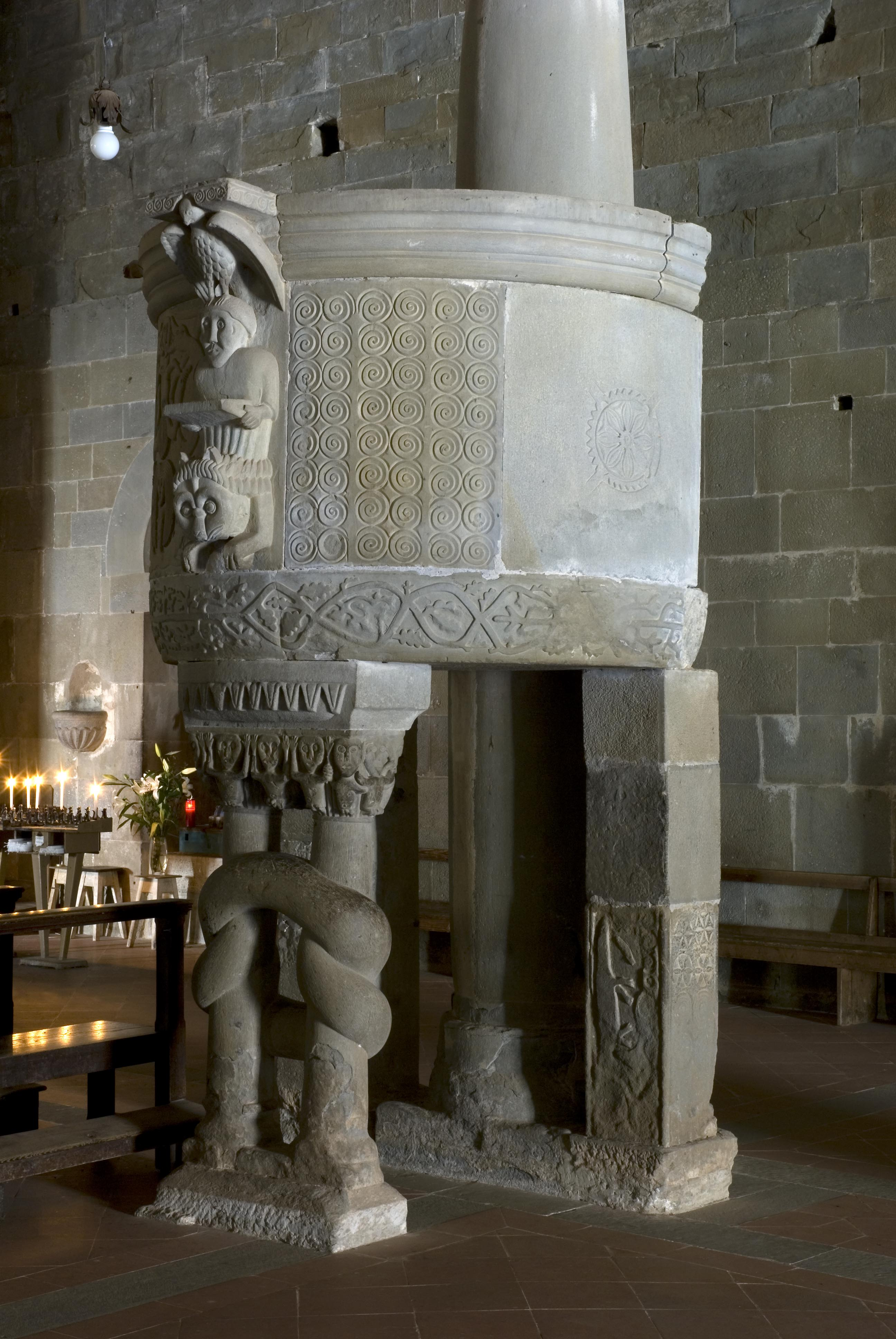
Church of San Pietro di Gropina

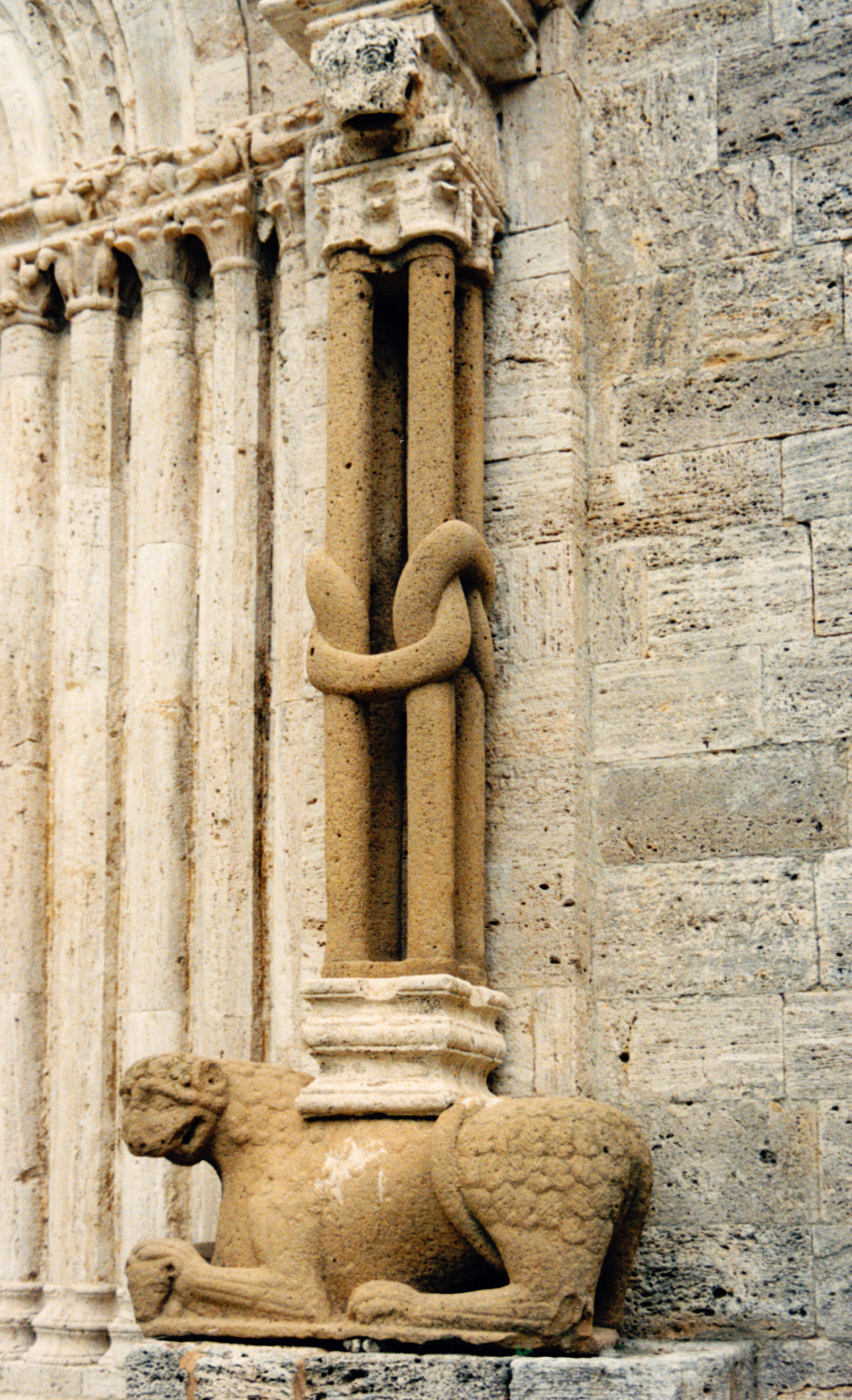
Collégiale de San Quirico d'Orcia (Tuscany)

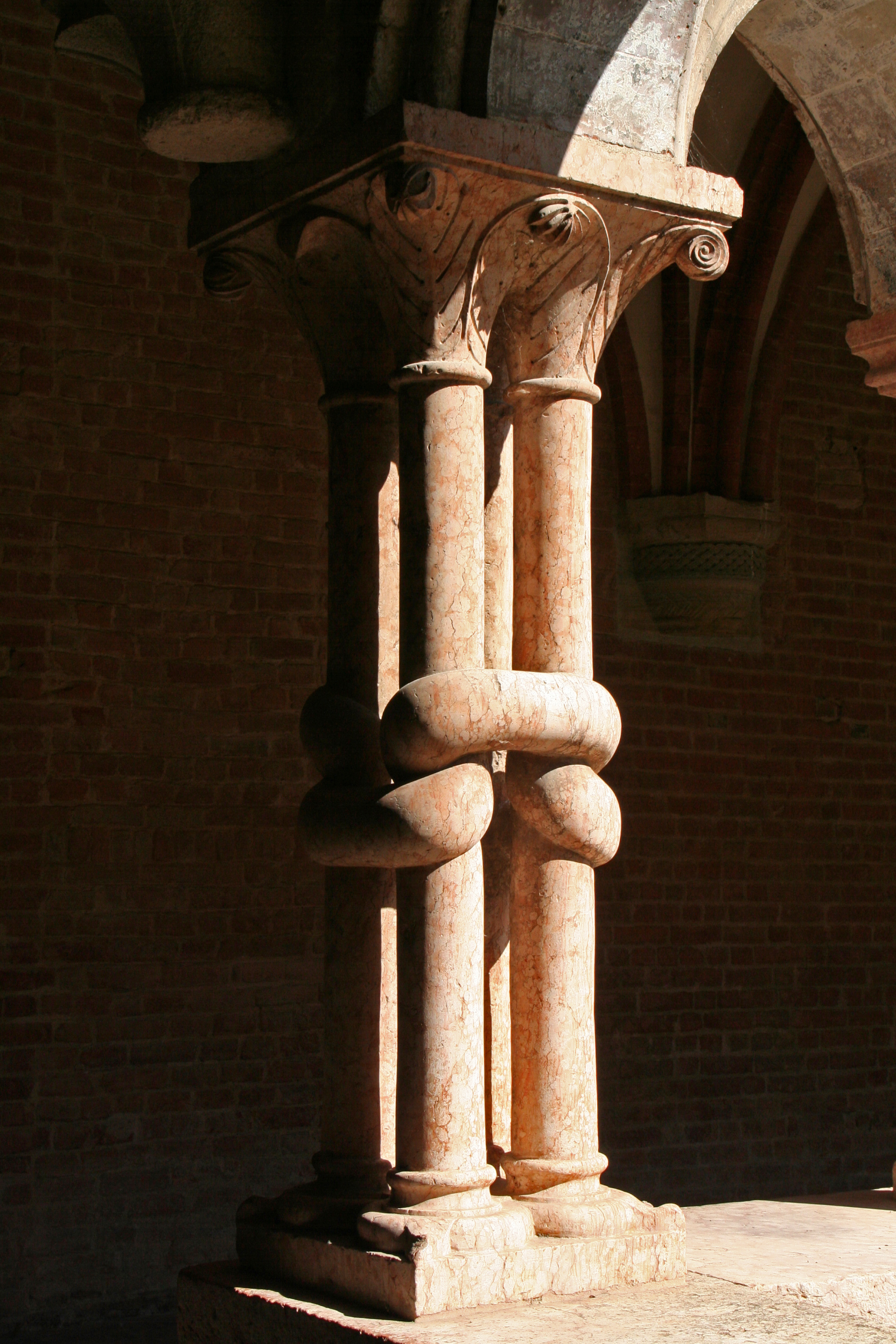
Abbey of Chiaravalle della Colomba

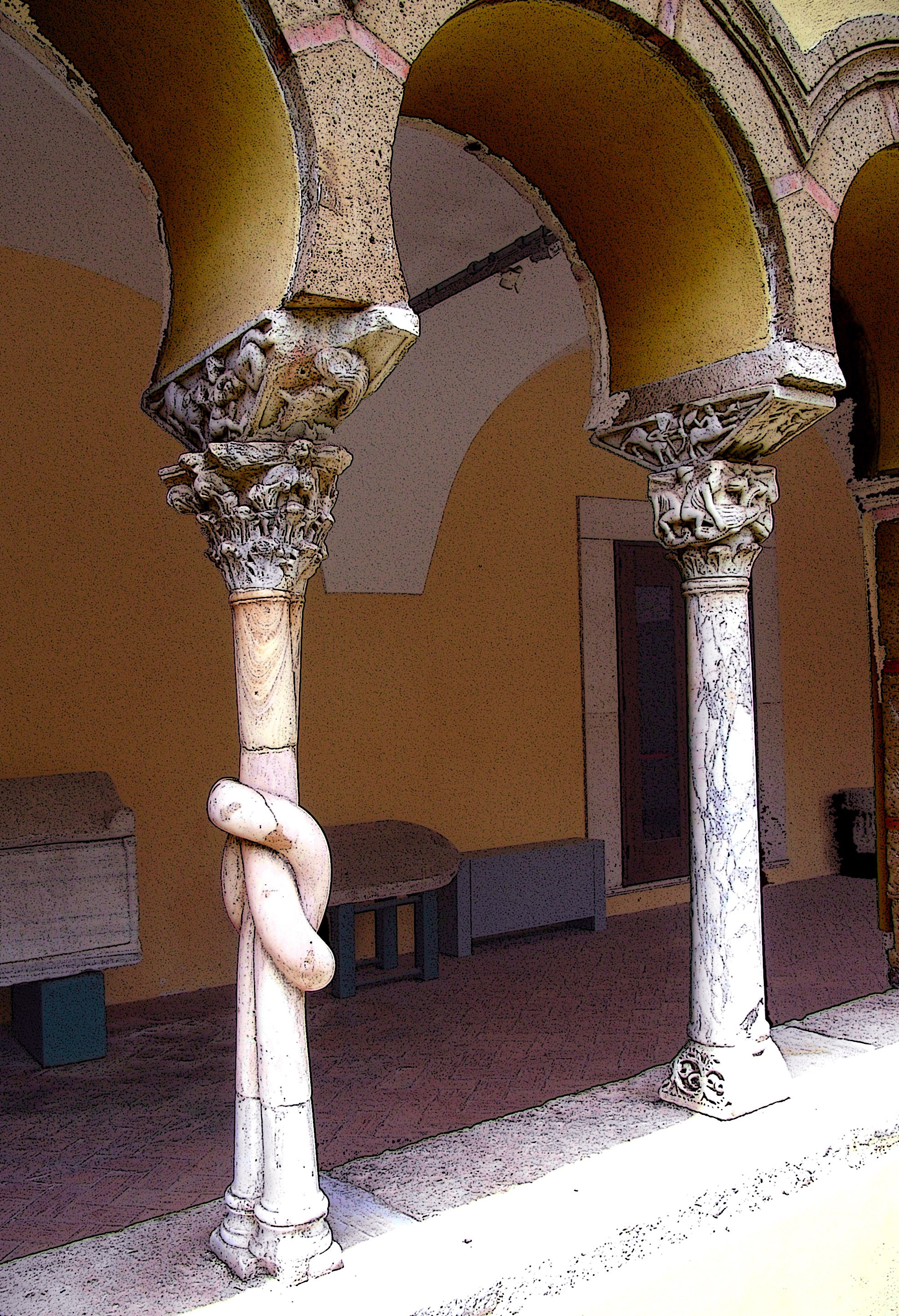
Columns of the cloister of Santa Sofia in Benevento, Italy

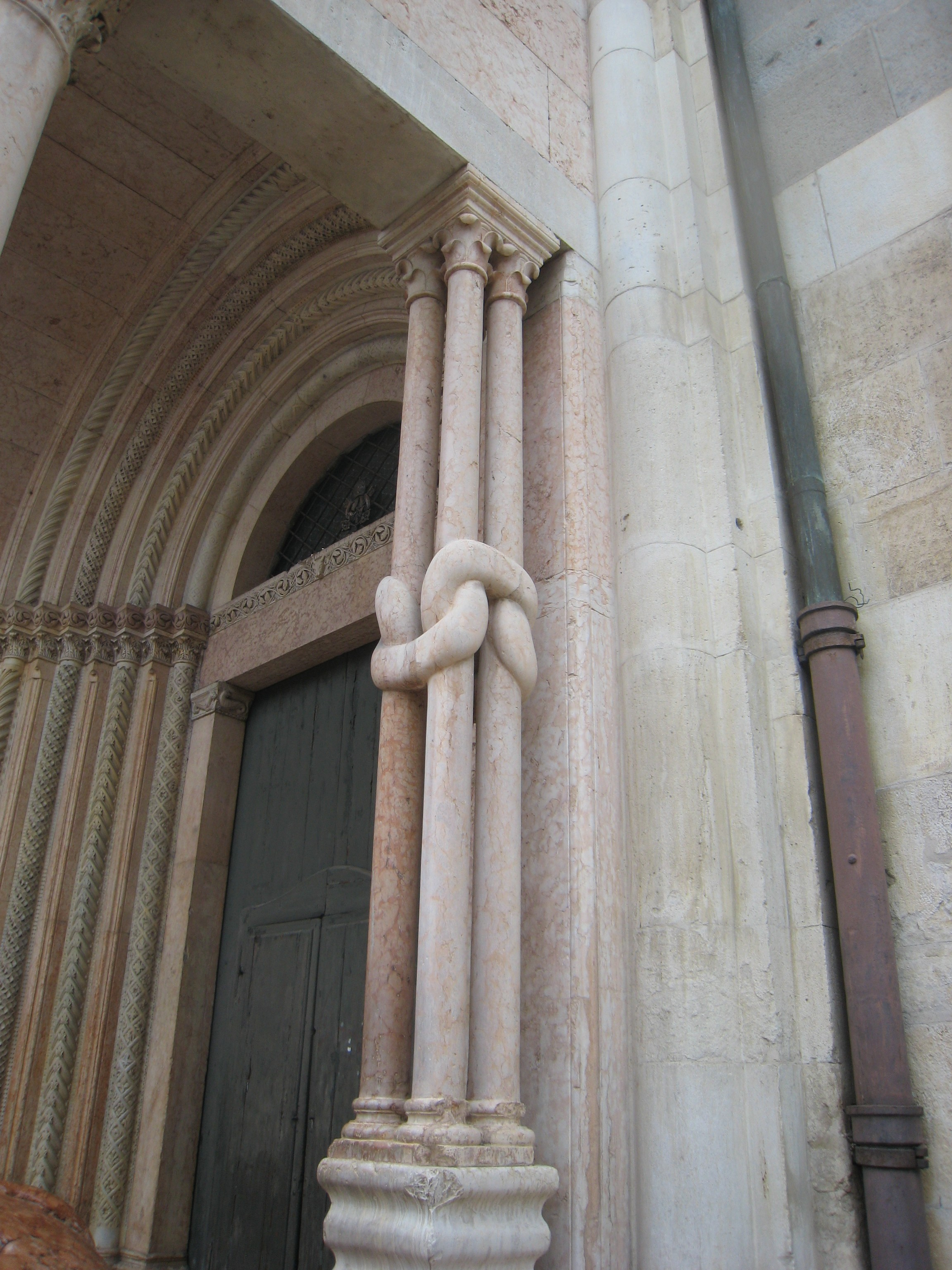
Columns of the Southern Portal of Modena Cathedral
