= Quarantoli =

- frazione of Mirandola
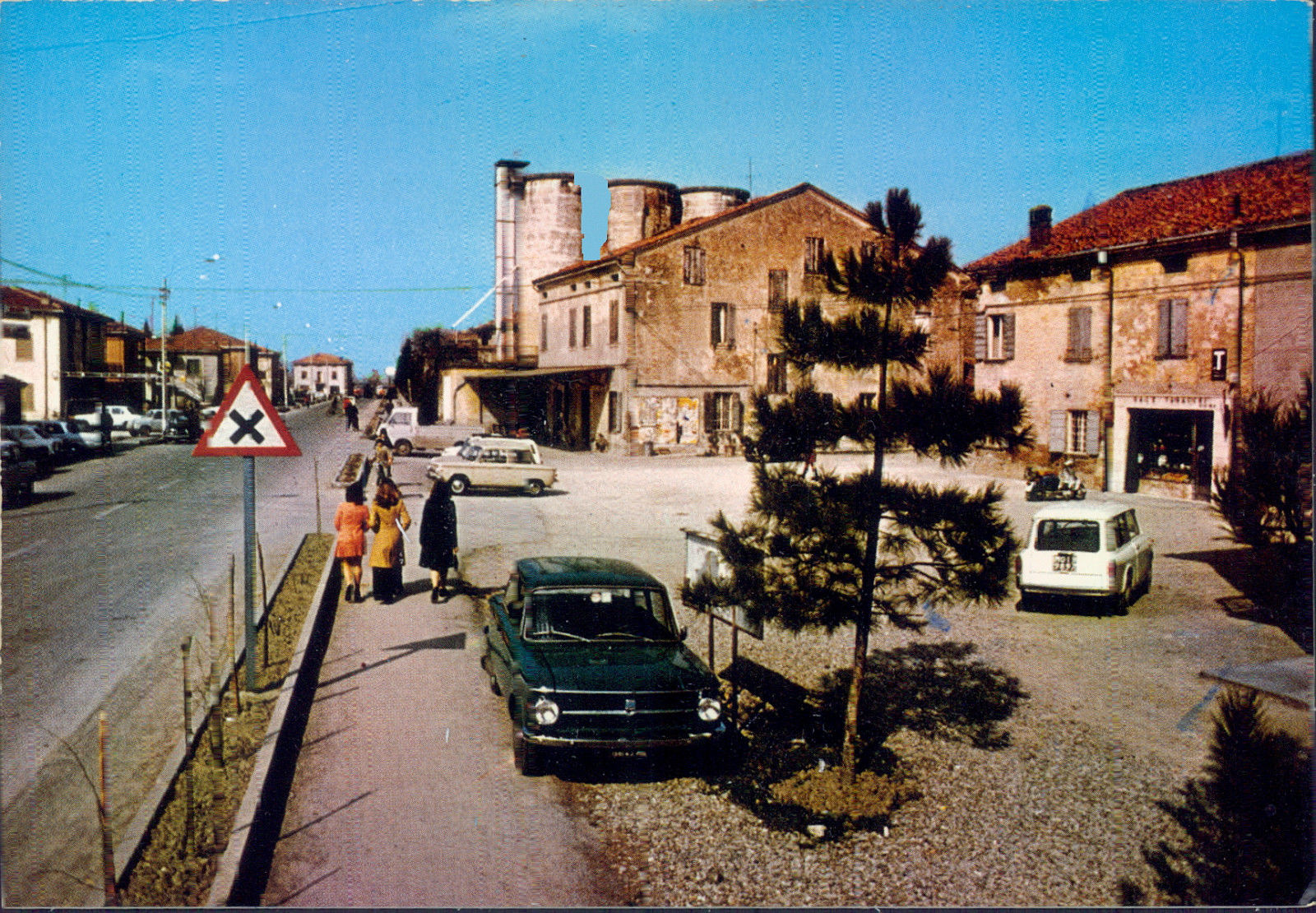
- Via Valli, Quarantoli
- Interactive map of Quarantoli
- Coordinates: 44.92191°N 11.09503°E
- Country: Italy
- Region: Emilia-Romagna
- Province: Modena
- Municipality: Mirandola
- Elevation: 14.1 m (46 ft)

Population (2011)
  - Total: 1,059
- Postal code: 41037
- Area code: 0535

Quaràntoli (Quaréntul in mirandolese dialect) is a frazione of Mirandola, in the province of Modena. It is about 5 km from Mirandola and 35 km from the provincial capital.

== History ==
In a document signed in Pavia on 24 June 904, King Berengar I, through the intercession of Bishop Peter of Reggio Emilia, donated some goods 'in loco qui dicitur Quarantula' to the Church of Modena.

On 31 March 1198 the 'Manfredo's sons' and the citizens of the oppidum and castrum of Quarantoli took the oath of citizenship to the municipality of Reggio Emilia.

On 15 April 1221, Cardinal Ugolino d'Ostia (the future pope Gregory IX) invested Ildeprandino de Pizo with the fief of Quarantoli: this legate was later confirmed by the papal bull of 9 June 1221 issued by Pope Honorius III. In 1227 the fiefdom passed to Bernardino, nephew of Guido Padella, while the investiture of Giovanni di Azzolino Manfredi dates back to December 1251.

In August 1311, Henry VII, Holy Roman Emperor recognised the dominion of the Pico family over Quarantoli and San Possidonio, which were under the jurisdiction of Reggio Emilia from 1315 to 1322.

The decline of Quarantoli began in 1440-1470, when the Pico family obtained the papal institution of the parish of Mirandola and decided to build the new cathedral of St Mary in the 'new borgo' of Mirandola.

Like the whole of the Modenese lowlands and surrounding areas, Quarantoli was also badly hit by the 2012 Emilia earthquake. The greatest damage was recorded in the Romanesque parish church and in the historic rural buildings (cottages and barns).

== Monuments and places of interest ==
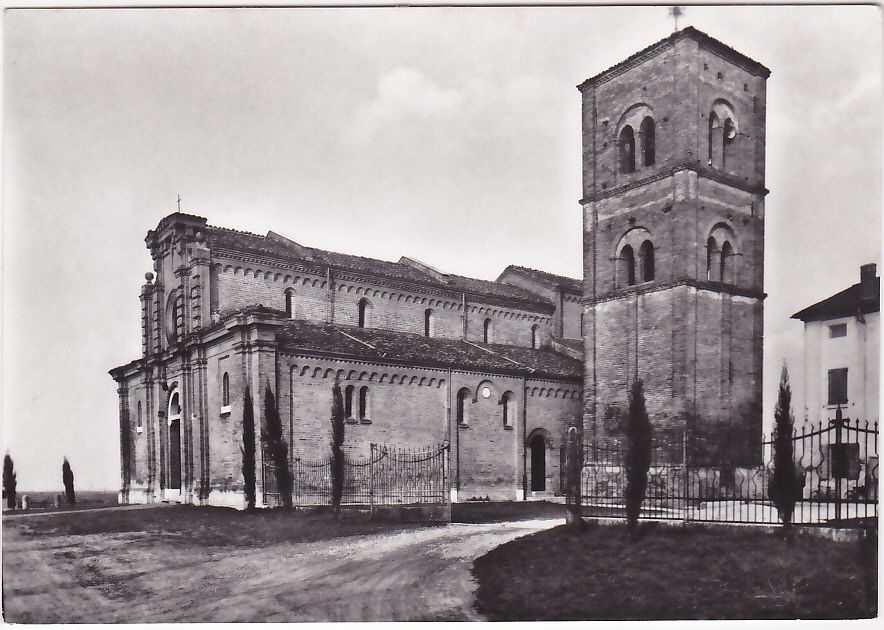
Pieve of Quarantoli

In the western part of the village stands the Parish of Our Lady of the Snows, whose existence has been documented since 1044 and whose importance was comparable to the abbey of Nonantola. In the 12th century the church was rebuilt by Matilde di Canossa (the date of its consecration on 15 November 1114 is carved on the altar). It was restored in the 15th century and the Baroque façade was built in 1670. In 1915, the church was enlarged. The medieval pulpit is decorated with Romanesque marble sculptures attributed to the circle of Wiligelmo (author of Modena Cathedral). The church was severely damaged in 2012 after the Emilia earthquake.

Leaving the village in the direction of Gavello and the Mirandola valleys, once reached the railway subway, there is a modest house with a niche in the place of a window housing a so-called 'street crucifix', known as the Quarantoli Christ. This is a devotional terracotta work made to scale in the 19th century, according to the ancient rural tradition that the cross and the image of Christ should keep evil away.

== Economy ==
The main activity is agriculture. The main products are apples, including Campanino (Bell apples), pears, fodder, sugar beets, maize and wheat, but also watermelons and melons in the valleys.

== Bibliography ==
- La pieve di Quarantoli. Modena: EPT Modena. 1972.
- S. Stocchi (1984). "La pieve di Quarantoli". Milano.
- Bruno Andreolli, ed. (1992). Quarantoli e la sua pieve nel Medioevo: atti della Giornata di studio, domenica 28 ottobre 1990. San Felice sul Panaro.

== See also ==
- Our Lady of the Snows, Quarantoli
- Mirandola
