= Siege of Mirandola (1321) =

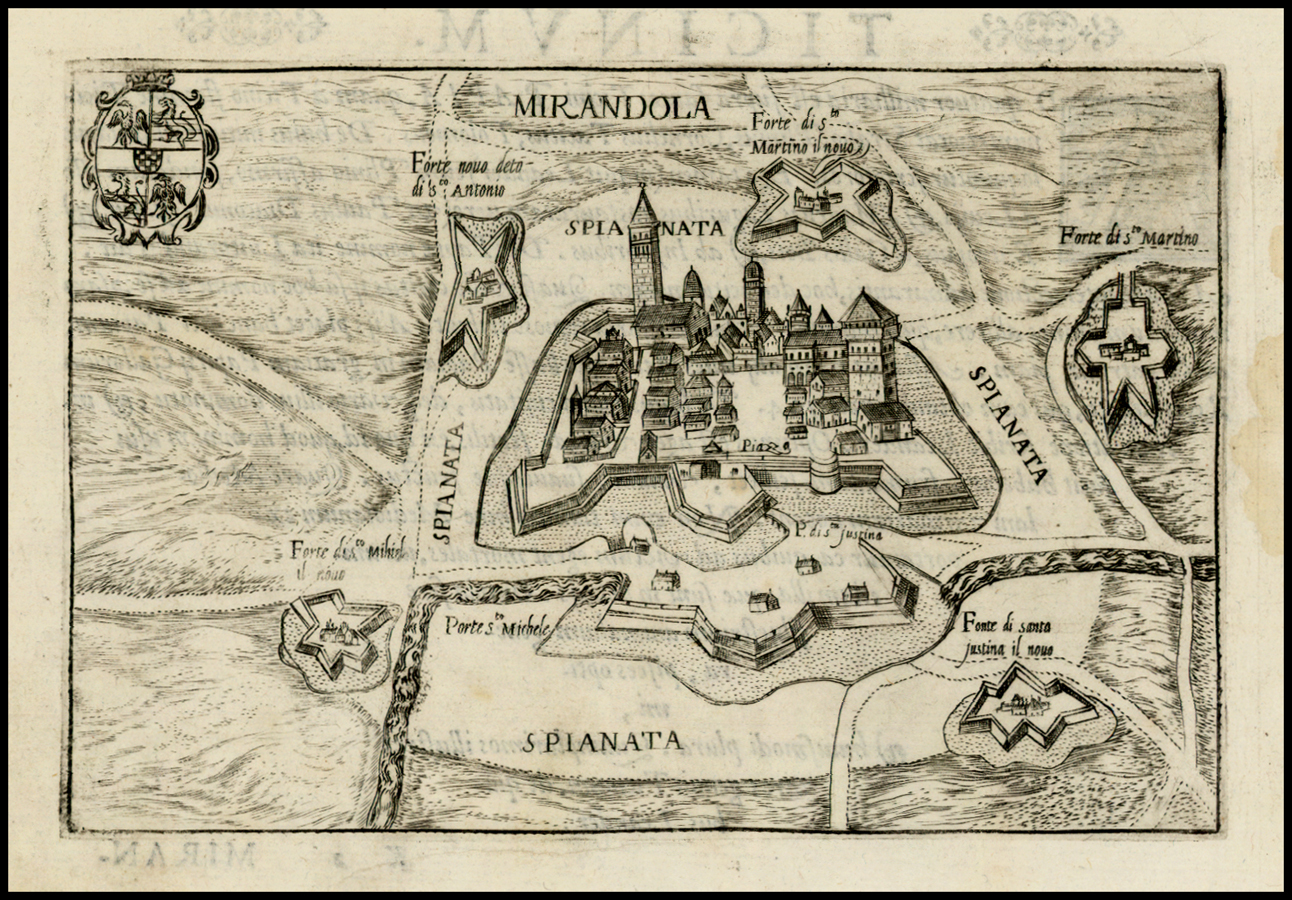
- Mirandola
Date	28 November - 31 December 1321
Location	Mirandola
Result	victory of Duke Passerino

Belligerents
Lordship of Mirandola	Lordship of Mantua

Commanders and leaders
Francesco I Pico; Bartolomeo Pico; Giovanni Pico	Rinaldo dei Bonacolsi; Francesco dei Bonacolsi

The siege of Mirandola in 1321, also known as the siege of Duke Passerino, was a military conflict involving Francesco I Pico, first lord of Mirandola, against Rinaldo dei Bonacolsi, better known as Duke Passerino, lord of Mantua.

== Background ==
In August 1311, Francesco I Pico obtained from Emperor Henry VII, during his descent into Italy, the investiture of imperial vicar of Mirandola. However, Francesco I Pico was captured by the Bolognese Guelphs at Baggiovara on 8 July 1312. Following this, the Grasulfi faction offered the lordship to Rinaldo dei Bonacolsi the following October.

Freed after nine months of imprisonment and having gone to Pisa and Verona, in June 1317 Francesco I Pico returned to Modena and, after neutralising the podestà Federico della Scala, successfully organised a revolt against the Duke Passerino at the beginning of 1318, regaining lordship over Modena.

In late November and early December 1319, Francesco I Pico sent a military expedition to help the people of Carpi who had rebelled against Manfredo I Pio allied with Bonacolsi; but being defeated, he had to cede the lordship of Modena to the latter again on 1 December 1319 and stipulate a truce.

== Siege ==
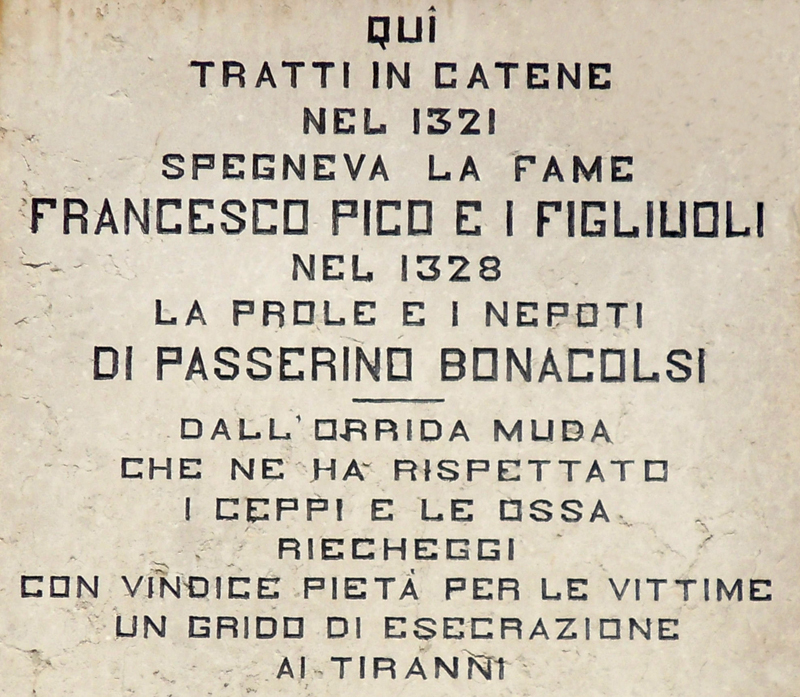
Plaque at the castle of Castel d'Ario.

Shortly afterwards, Duke Passerino decided not to respect the agreements made (certis pactis in brevi male servatis) and on Friday 27 November 1321 had Francesco I Pico and his sons Tommasino and Prendiparte arrested, together with Zaccaria Tosabecchi and his brother and son. On the following Wednesday, the Pico family were imprisoned in the dungeons of Castel d'Ario castle, where they were starved to death after tearing each other to pieces, as in the lugubrious affair of Count Ugolino della Gherardesca described by Dante Alighieri in the Divine Comedy and which took place 33 years earlier.

Duke Passerino began the siege of the castle of the Pico on Saturday 28 November 1321 and lasted just over a month.

Finally, on 31 December 1321, the castle was conquered and subsequently razed to the ground. The moat (vallum) was levelled.

== Afterwards ==
In 1328, Niccolò Pico, allied with the Gonzaga and Della Scala who had conquered Mantua, managed to avenge his father: he locked up the Duke Passerino's sons and grandsons in the same tower, starving them to death too.

Mirandola, which had become a dominion of the Gonzaga family together with Mantua since 16 August 1328, was however only returned to the Pico family by Emperor Charles IV on 23 December 1354, when Francesco II Pico was appointed lord of the city.

== See also ==
- Castle of the Pico
- Duchy of Mirandola
- Guelphs and Ghibellines
