= Francesco I Pico =

Italian nobleman

- Lord of Mirandola
- Coat of arms
- Successor: Rinaldo "Passerino" Bonacolsi
- Born: 1272
- Died: 27 November 1321 (aged 48–49); Castel d'Ario
- Noble family: Pico della Mirandola
- Father: Bartolomeo Pico
- Mother: Adelina Pallavicino

Francesco I Pico (c. 1272 - 1321) was an Italian condottiero and politician of the Pico dynasty. He was the first lord and imperial vicar of Mirandola (1311-1321), and also podestà (1311-12 and 1318-19) and imperial vicar of Modena (1311-12).

== Life ==
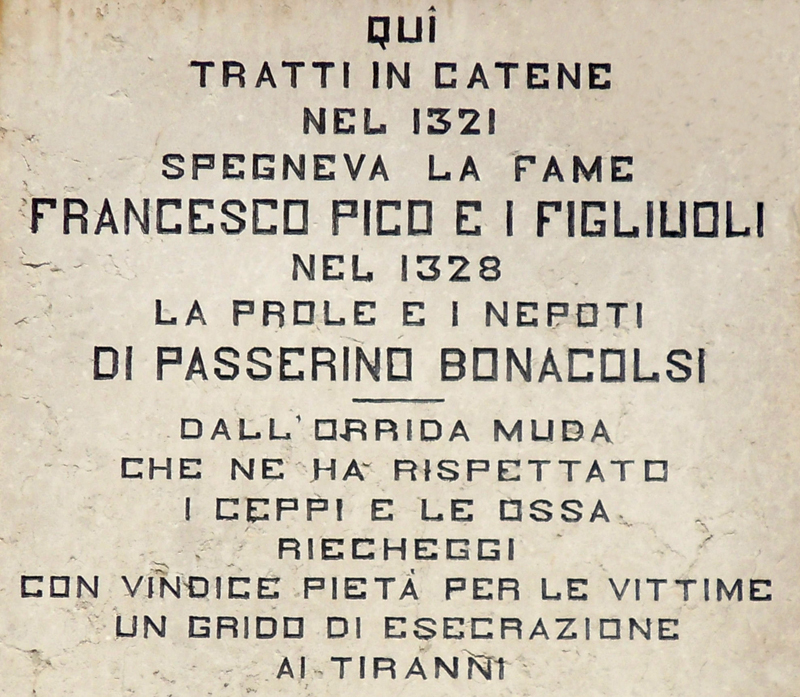
Castel d'Ario, plaque on the castle.

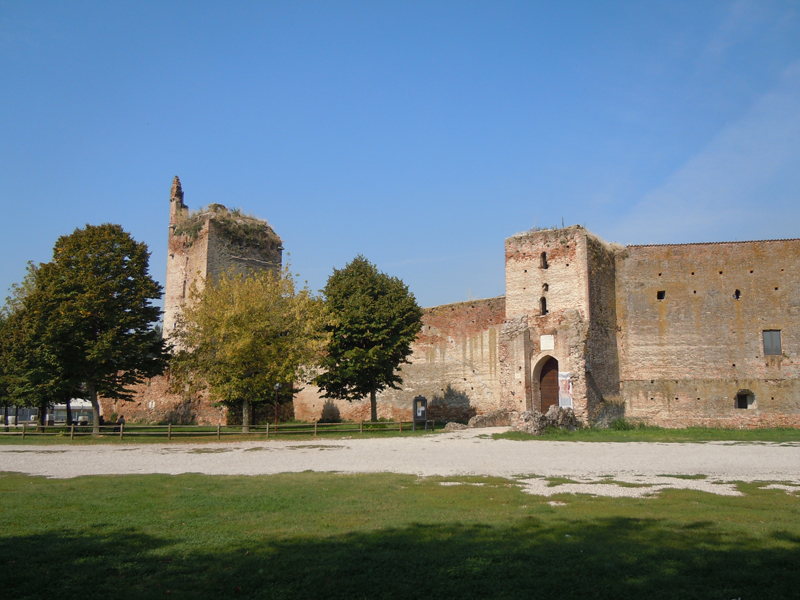
Rocca di Castel d'Ario

He was the son of Bartolomeo and Aledisia Pallavicino. After serving the Holy Roman Emperor Henry VII, Francesco I PIco was appointed as imperial vicar in 1311 and entered the city of Modena to administer it.

For about a year he found himself managing relations between the factions of the wealthy Guelph (Papacy) and Ghibelline (Emperor) families, but he was caught in an ambush at the gates of Modena near Baggiovara, where he was alerted to the army of the city of Bologna encamped to lay siege to the city of Modena. After a clash, he escaped by taking refuge inside the walls of Modena, remaining with only 200 soldiers out of 1500 who had gone out on the expedition with him. From that day on, every day the bells tolled, because Francesco I Pico was taking revenge for the betrayal on all the guilty parties.

All the Guelphs and citizens of Modena were now exhausted and all turned to the lord of Mantua for protection, offering the keys of the city in exchange. The lord of Mantua, Rinaldo Bonacolsi, known as 'il Passerino' due to his diminutive stature, was a man much feared for his ferocity and implacability. He intervened with his troops and laid siege to the city of Modena, but let Francesco I Pico know that if he renounced the city, the lord of Mantua would grant him a pass to leave, saving him and his wife and two children.

After a siege of twenty days, Francesco I Pico left the city, left Modena and for about five years served as imperial vicar in Lucca and Pisa. Returning to his own domains, which were located in the city of Mirandola where there was a castrum or castle dating back to before 1200, he found the castle razed to the ground on the orders of Rinaldo Bonacolsi and so did the various country houses and part of the walls.

Someone who was a friend of the lord of Mantua told him that he had seen Francesco I wandering around La Mirandola and so he was captured together with his two sons, taken to the city of Modena stripped naked and tied to the backs of mules and made to pass among the Modenese plebs who whipped them, kicked them, threw stones, used pitchforks, all to avenge the wrongs they had suffered in the past.

Francesco I Pico and his two sons Prendiparte and Tommasino were then taken by order of the Bonacolsi (27 November 1321) to the fortress of Castel d'Ario (Mantua), where they were locked up alive without water or food and ended up devouring each other. A plaque, placed at the entrance, recalls the event. On that occasion, after a month-long siege, Mirandola was occupied by the Bonacolsi who, on their fall in 1328, ceded it to the Gonzaga.

== Bibliography ==
- Giovanni B. Crollalanza, Dizionario storico-blasonico delle famiglie nobili e notabili italiane estinte e fiorenti, Editore Dir. del Giornale Araldico, 1886.
- Litta, Pompeo (1835). Famiglie celebri di Italia. Pico della Mirandola [Famous families of Italy. Pico della Mirandola.]. Torino. p. 2. [ISBN unspecified].

== See also ==
- Siege of Mirandola (1321)
