= Wiligelmo =

Italian sculptor

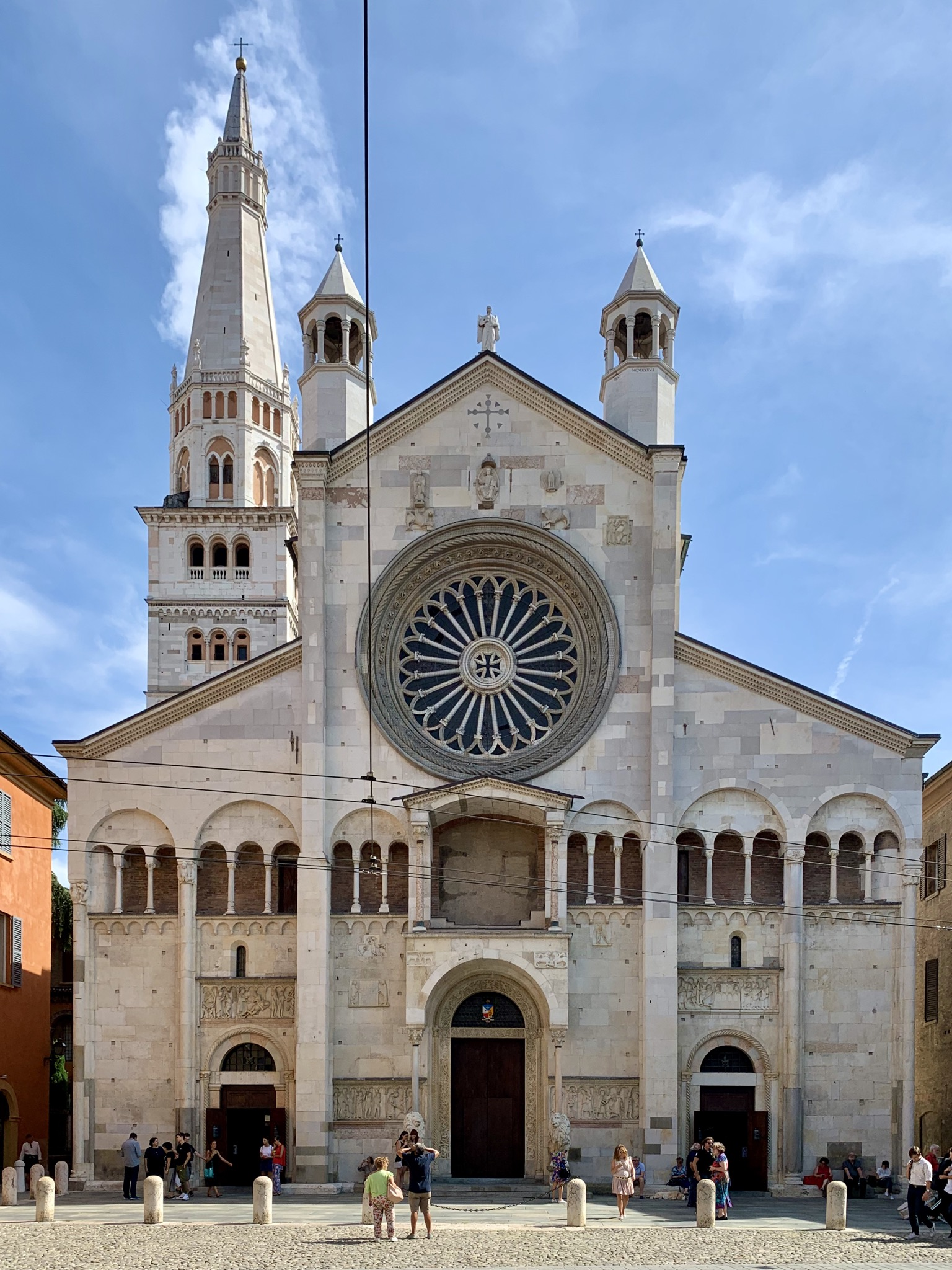
Modena Cathedral

Wiligelmo (also known as Wiligelmus, Gulielmo da Modena, Cousin of Elmo or Guglielmo da Modena) was an Italian sculptor active between c. 1099 and 1120. He was among the earliest sculptors in Italy to produce large-format architectural sculptures.

== Biography ==
Wiligelmo must have worked at Modena Cathedral from c. 1099 to c. 1110. Some of his sculptures were reassembled in the later 12th century by the Campionesi, and there is some dispute as to their original use, some scholars considering them to have formed part of liturgical furnishings and others insisting that they were always intended for a position on the façade. Wiligelmo was responsible for the four Genesis reliefs, the dedication plaque, the two torch-bearing putti, and the decorative programme of the central portal, all on the west façade; for the many figured capitals of the exterior; and probably also for the series of large single figures from the metopes (Modena, Museo Lapidario Estense), which originally served as demarcations of the bays at the top of the nave walls.

Other works by his hand are the four large prophets from the jambs of the portal of the old cathedral at Cremona, dating from before the earthquake of 1117, and the fragments of three Labours of the Months from a lost portal at the nearby Cluniac abbey church of San Benedetto Po (San Benedetto Po, Civico Museo Polironiano; Romanore, priv. col.). These works, which are all carved in marble, are characterized by the use of large, stocky figures in profile with big heads and feet, solemn expressions, and angular yet dramatic movements in the narrative scenes. The figures are usually set under decorative arches.

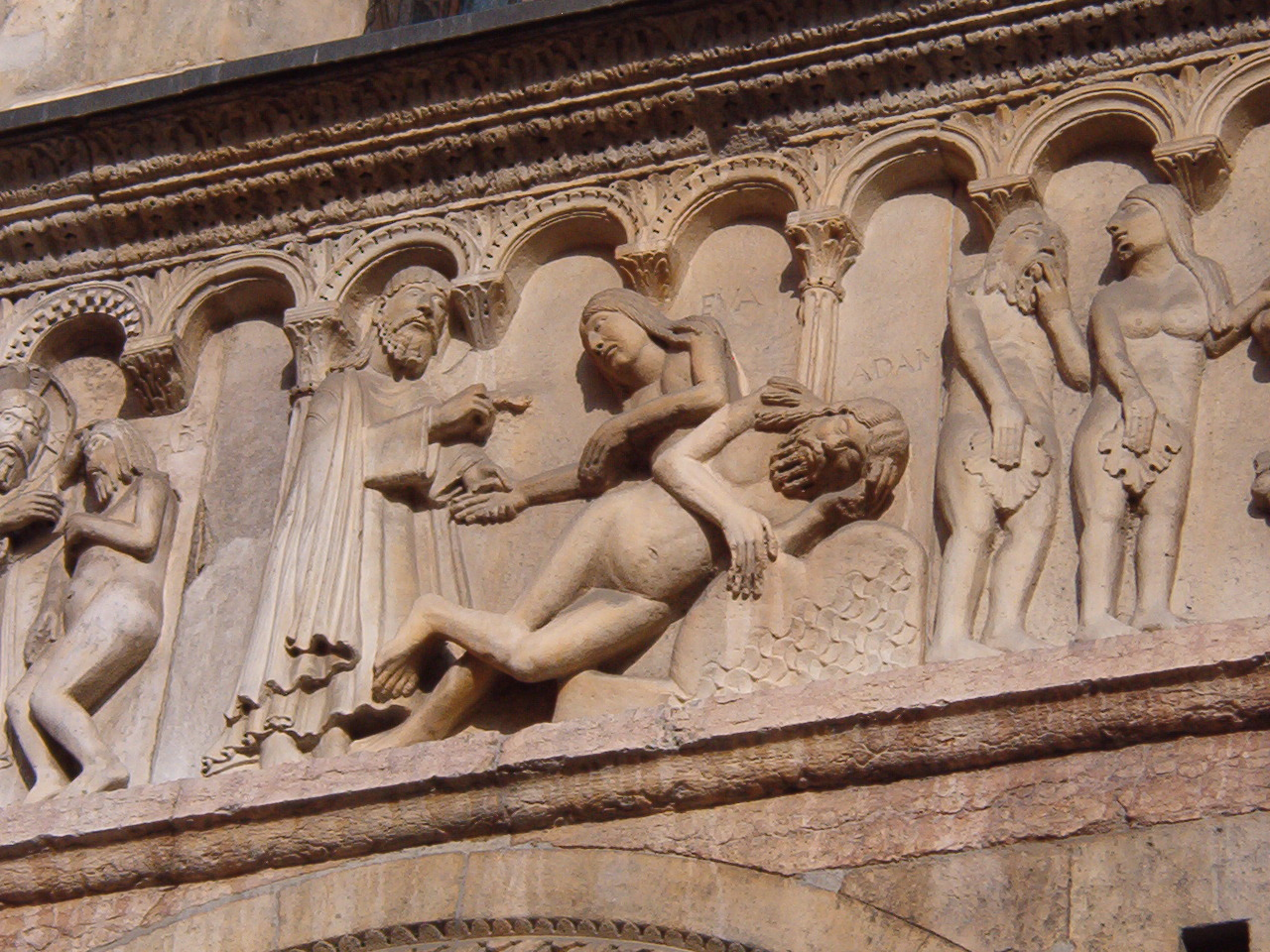
Adam and Eve, Modena Cathedral

In the past scholars have seen connections to the early schools of Romanesque sculpture in Aquitaine and Aragon, but opinion now tends to consider these all as simultaneous and independent developments of monumental sculpture. Inspiration seems to be drawn more from ivory carving, metalwork, and Roman sculpture. Provincial Roman works served as direct models for several of Wiligelmo’s works, as did Carolingian and Ottonian ivory carvings and local manuscript illumination. From such varied sources Wiligelmo created a monumental figure-style emerging from the plane of the relief. The doleful figures of the atlantids and that of the dying Cain in the Genesis reliefs can be compared to the large single metope figures, which are of an even more monumental nature. Most of Wiligelmo’s sculptures bear inscriptions that identify the figures or include more elaborate texts of a biblical, secular, or liturgical character.

== Modena Cathedral ==
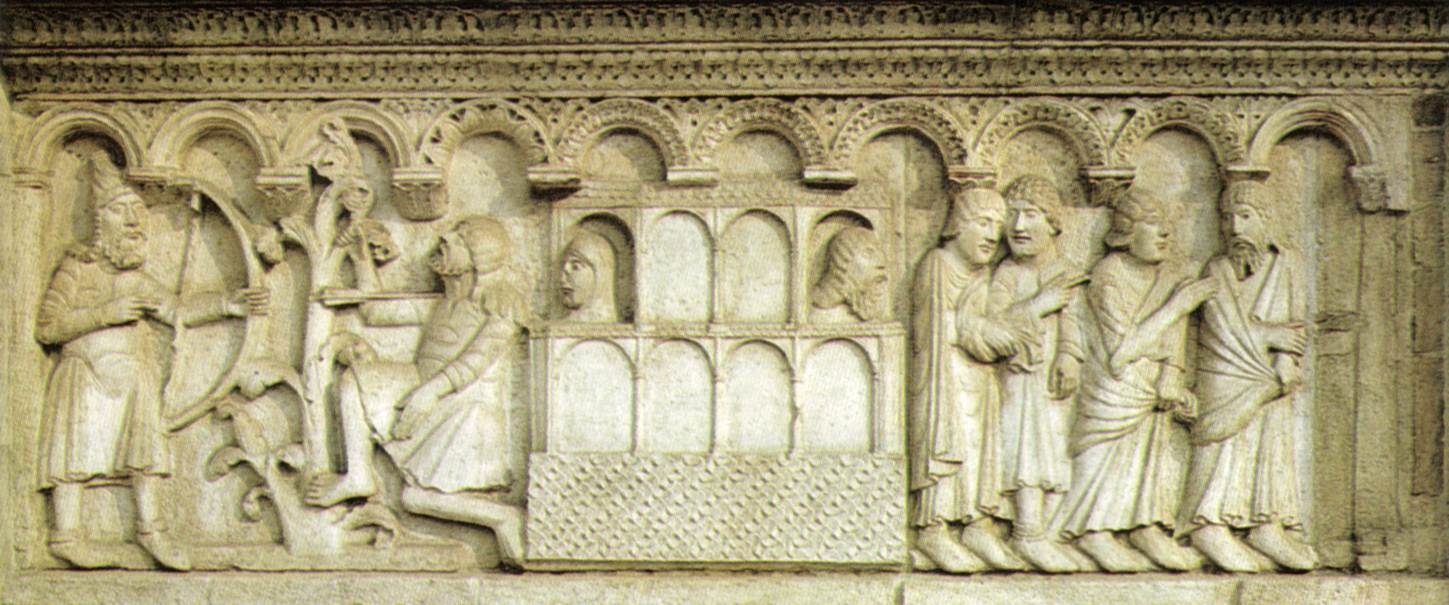
Wiligelmo, Cain and Lamech, Noah, relief from the west facade, c. 1100. Height about 36 in. (91.4cm). Cathedral of Modena.

Wiligelmo carved four relief panels on the west facade of Modena Cathedral (c. 1110): two flank the central portal and two others sit above the side portals. They collectively depict scenes from the Book of Genesis, and originally formed a continuous frieze on each side of the central portal (they have since been relocated to their current positions). Others have theorized that they were sculpted to adorn the entrance of the crypt. The reliefs are made of marble and measure about one meter tall. These are considered to be revivals of ancient Roman relief sculptural traditions, and are prime examples of Romanesque sculpture. Wiligelmo's name is known from an epigraph carved as a postscript to the Latin inscription over the foundation date on that facade: "Among sculptors, your work shines forth, Wiligelmo".

One panel illustrates the story of Cain, Lamech, and Noah. This relief contains two separate stories, one of Lamech shooting Cain in the eye with an arrow, blinding him, and the other of Noah and his family on Noah’s Ark and then departing the Ark. Wiligelmo’s sculpting style depicts the people in a dramatic way by packing them tightly into the relief. The sculpted people were inspired by Roman sculpture in the Constantinian era, as their feet and legs all tightly fit together and point in the same direction, as well as having densely proportioned bodies. Another panel illustrates the Creation and Temptation of Adam and Eve.

== The School of Wiligelmo ==
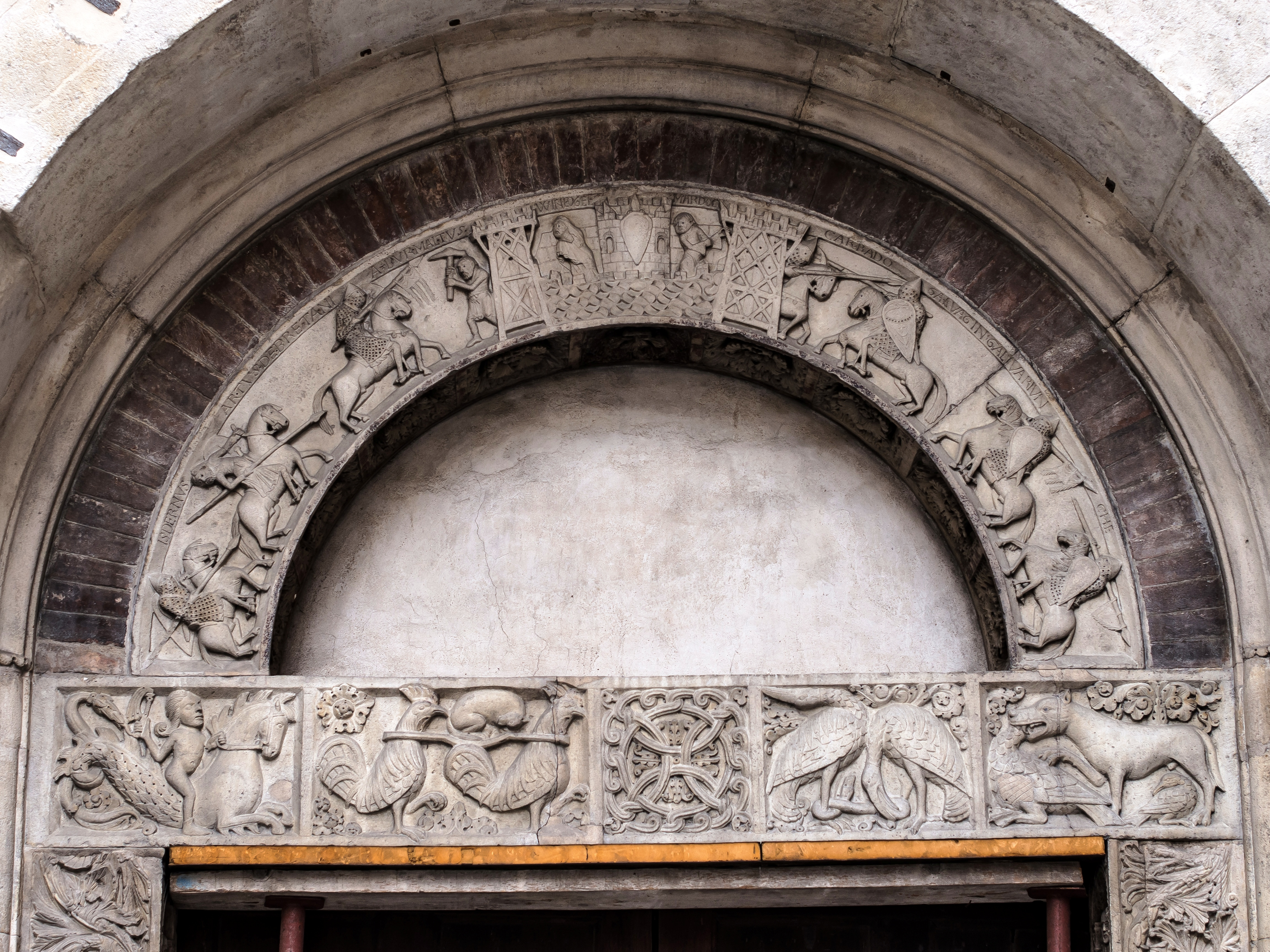
Upper part of the Porta della Pescheria.

Other works at Modena Cathedral and on neighbouring monuments, which are carved in a slightly different figure style but date from approximately the same period, have been attributed to masters in Wiligelmo’s workshop. The sculptures of the side portals at Modena, the Porta dei Principi, and the Porta della Pescheria, are the work of sculptors designated the Master of San Geminiano and the Master of the Artù respectively. They follow the arrangement of Wiligelmo’s main portal, but the figures are smaller and more agile, full of expressive intensity, forming a new, more energetic narrative style. The Porta dei Principi is the first known example of a two-storey porch-portal supported by column-bearing lions or atlantids: a distinctive north Italian form, the creation of which has been associated with Wiligelmo.

The fragments of the Four Evangelists’ symbols now set above the rose window on the main façade at Modena share features with sculpture (a pulpit bearing Evangelist symbols) at Our Lady of the Snows, Quarantoli, at Cremona (fragments of Genesis reliefs and some atlantids bearing columns from the old façade, now in Cremona Cathedral and Milan, Museo Civico di Milano) and at the nearby Benedictine abbey of Nonantola. The jambs of the main portal at Nonantola have been attributed to the ‘Master of Astolfo’, a pupil of Wiligelmo, and the fragments reassembled in the tympanum after an earthquake in 1117 have been thought to come from a pulpit. The same master also probably carved the north portal of Piacenza Cathedral. All these sculptors clearly belonged to a large workshop under the direction of Wiligelmo, which also included the young Nicholaus.

== Gallery ==
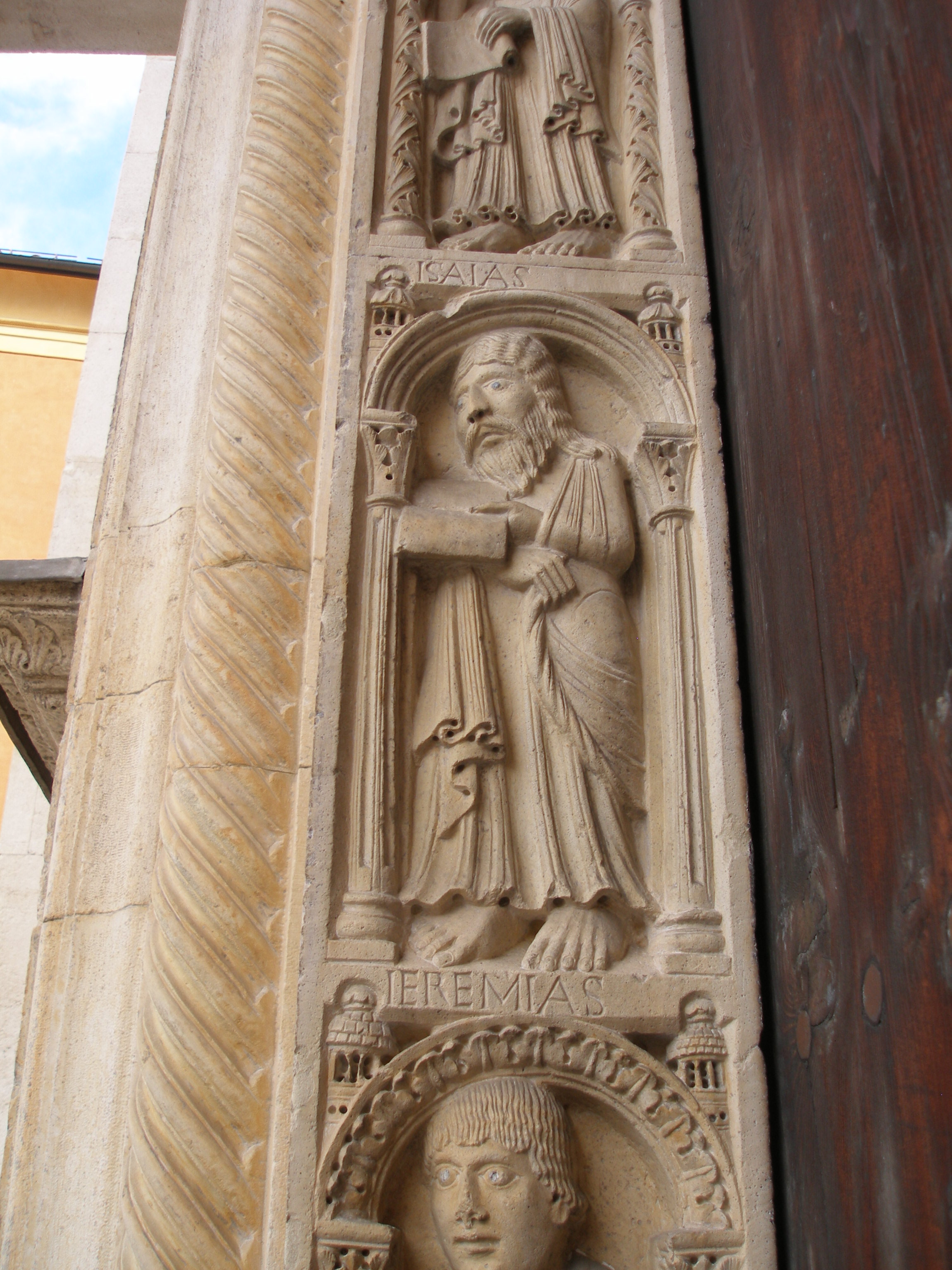
Prophets on the left jamb of Modena Cathedral

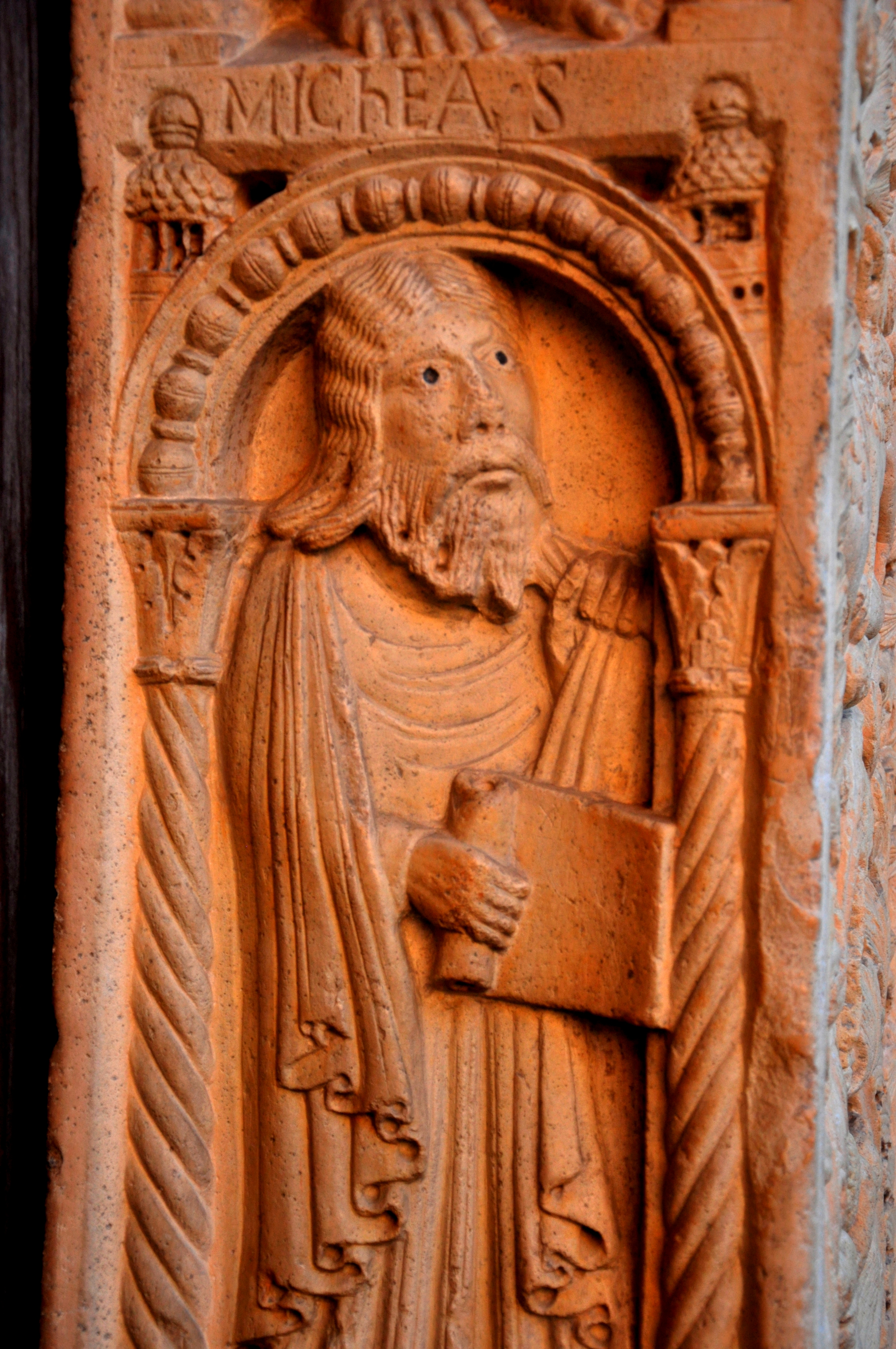
The Prophet Micah

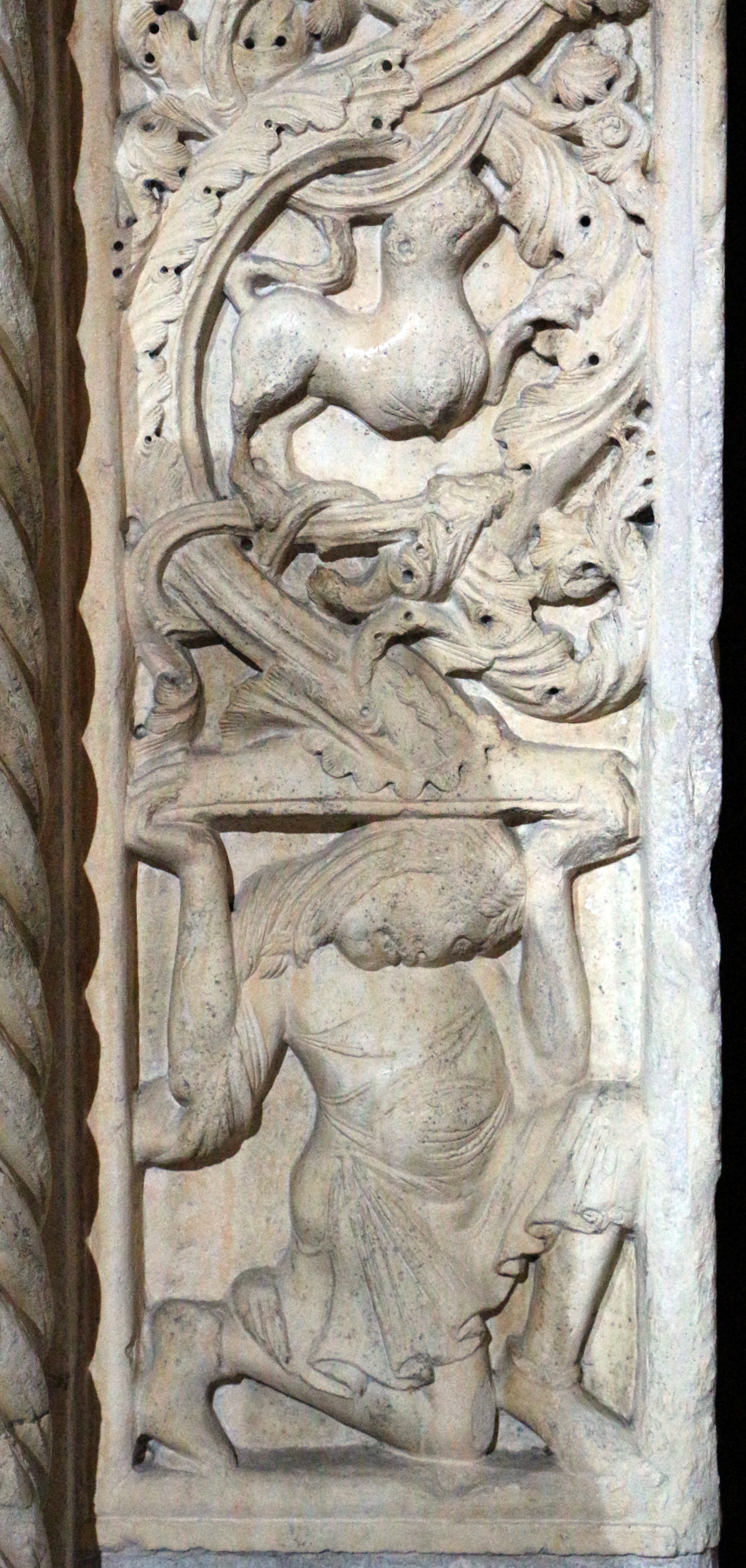
Left atlantid of Modena Cathedral

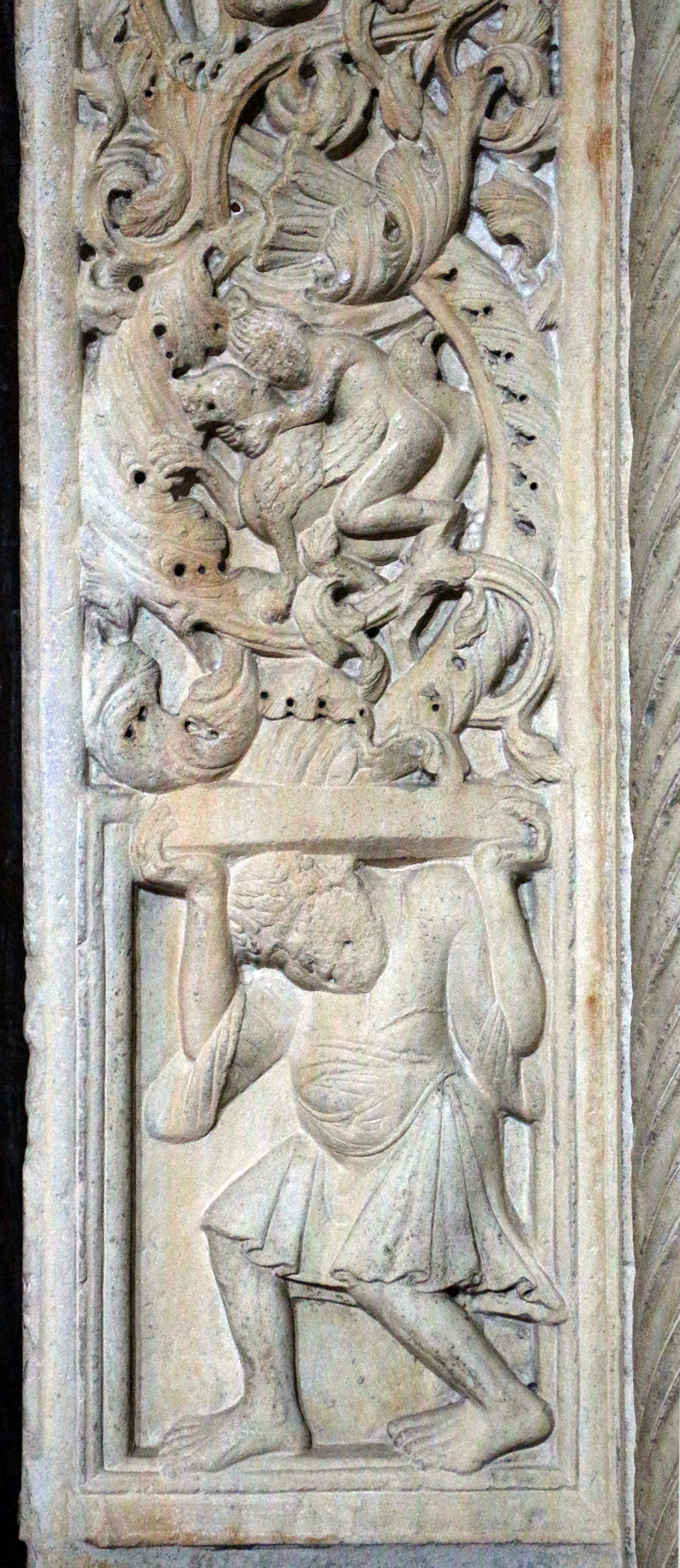
Right atlantid of Modena Cathedral

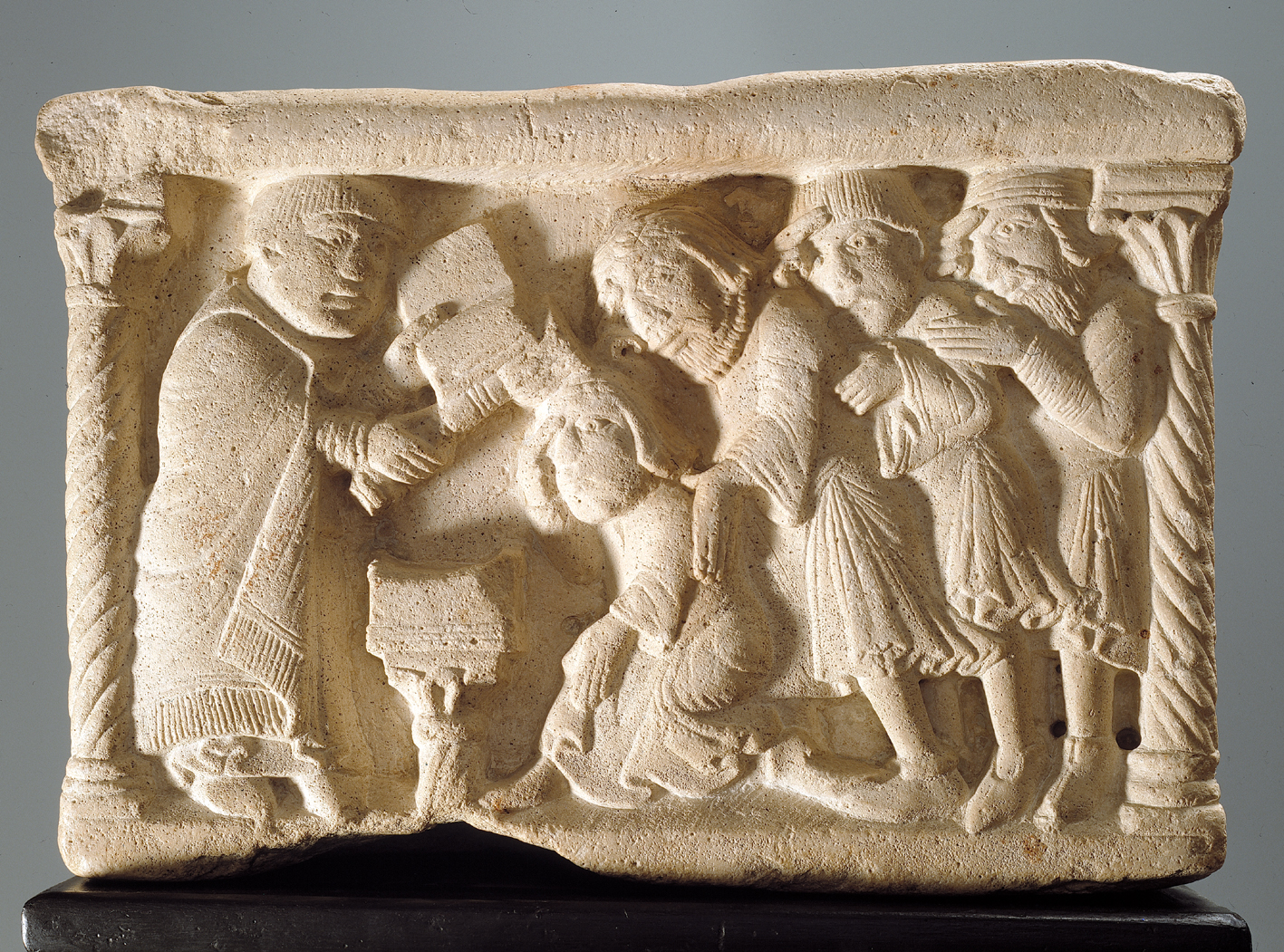
Piletta Wiligelmica

== Bibliography ==
- De Francovich, Géza (1940). "Wiligelmo da Modena e gli inizi della scultura romanica europea". Rivista del Reale istituto d'archeologia e storia dell'arte. 7: 225–94.
- Salvini, Roberto (1956). Wiligelmo e le origini della scultura romanica. Milan: A. Martello.
- Salvini, Roberto (1963). La scultura romanica in Europa. Milan: Garzanti.
- Quintavalle, Arturo Carlo (1966). Da Wiligelmo a Nicolò. Parma: Editrice Studium.
- Quintavalle, Arturo Carlo (1967). Wiligelmo e la sua scuola. Florence: Sansoni.
- Quintavalle, Arturo Carlo (1973). "Piacenza Cathedral, Lanfranco, and the School of Wiligelmo". The Art Bulletin. 55 (1): 40–57. doi:10.2307/3049063. JSTOR 3049063.
- Kleiner FS, Mamiya CJ, Tansey RG (2000). Gardner's Art Through The Ages (11th ed.). Wadsworth. ISBN 0-534-16703-9.
