= Ottava rima =

Stanza rhyming ABABABCC

Ottava rima is a rhyming stanza form of Italian origin. Originally used for long poems on heroic themes, it later came to be popular in the writing of mock-heroic works. Its earliest known use is in the writings of Giovanni Boccaccio.

The ottava rima stanza in English consists of eight iambic lines, usually iambic pentameters. Each stanza consists of three alternate rhymes and one double rhyme, following the $\mathrm{ABABABCC}$ rhyme scheme. The form is similar to the older Sicilian octave, but evolved separately and is unrelated. The Sicilian octave is derived from the medieval strambotto and was a crucial step in the development of the sonnet, whereas the ottava rima is related to the canzone, a stanza form.

== History ==
=== Italian ===
Boccaccio used ottava rima for a number of minor poems and, most significantly, for two of his major works, the Teseide (1340) and the Filostrato (c. 1335). These two poems defined the form as the main one to be used for epic poetry in Italian for the next two centuries. For instance, ottava rima was used by Poliziano and by Boiardo in his 1486 epic poem Orlando Innamorato. The following year, Luigi Pulci published his Morgante Maggiore in which the mock-heroic, half-serious, half-burlesque use of the form that is most familiar to modern English-language readers first appeared. However, poets such as Ludovico Ariosto and Torquato Tasso continued to use ottava rima for serious epic poetry.

Canto l’arme pietose, e ’l Capitano
Che ’l gran sepolcro liberò di Cristo.
Molto egli oprò col senno e con la mano;
Molto soffrì nel glorioso acquisto:
E invan l’Inferno a lui s’oppose; e invano
s’armò d’Asia e di Libia il popol misto:
Chè ’l Ciel gli diè favore, e sotto ai santi
Segni ridusse i suoi compagni erranti.

— Tasso: Gerusalemme Liberata, lines 1-8
Translation:

The sacred armies, and the godly knight,
That the great sepulchre of Christ did free,
I sing; much wrought his valor and foresight,
And in that glorious war much suffered he;
In vain 'gainst him did Hell oppose her might,
In vain the Turks and Morians armèd be:
His soldiers wild, to brawls and mutines prest,
Reducèd he to peace, so Heaven him blest.

— Translated by Edward Fairfax

In the epoch of Baroque Giambattista Marino employed ottava rima in Adone (1623). Another important work was written by a woman, Lucrezia Marinella, the author of long epic poem L'Enrico, ovvero Bisanzio acquistato (Enrico, or, Byzantium Conquered), that was translated into English by Maria Galli Stampino. There are also many other examples of using the stanza. Many classic works were translated into ottava rima. It was later used in Italian libretti; perhaps the most famous example ends with the title of the comic opera Così fan tutte (1789).

=== English ===
In English, ottava rima first appeared in Elizabethan translations of Tasso and Ariosto. The form also became popular for original works, such as Michael Drayton's The Barons' Wars, Thomas Heywood's Troia Britannica, or Emilia Lanier's Salve Deus Rex Judaeorum. William Browne's Britannia's Pastorals also contains passages in ottava rima. The first English poet to write mock-heroic ottava rima was John Hookham Frere, whose 1817-8 poem Prospectus and Specimen of an Intended National Work used the form to considerable effect. Lord Byron read Frere's work and saw the potential of the form. He quickly produced Beppo, his first poem to use the form. Shortly after this, Byron began working on his Don Juan (1819–1824), probably the best-known English poem in ottava rima. Byron also used the form for The Vision of Judgment (1822). Shelley translated the Homeric Hymn to Hermes into English in ottava rima. In the 20th century, William Butler Yeats used the form in several of his best later poems, including "Sailing to Byzantium" and "Among School Children". So did Kenneth Koch for instance in his autobiographical poem "Seasons on Earth" of 1987. In America Emma Lazarus wrote the poem An Epistle that consists of thirty four ottava rimas. Earlier Richard Henry Wilde used the stanza in his long poem Hesperia. In keeping with the "mock-heroic" tone, Kevin McAleer wrote his 2018 biography of actor Errol Flynn entirely in ottava rima.

Some examples

From Frere's Prospectus and Specimen of an Intended National Work, commonly known as The Monks and the Giants

But chiefly, when the shadowy moon had shed
O'er woods and waters her mysterious hue,
Their passive hearts and vacant fancies fed
With thoughts and aspirations strange and new,
Till their brute souls with inward working bred
Dark hints that in the depths of instinct grew
Subjection not from Locke's associations,
Nor David Hartley's doctrine of vibrations.

From Byron's Don Juan

"Go, little book, from this my solitude!
I cast thee on the waters – go thy ways!
And if, as I believe, thy vein be good,
The world will find thee after many days."
When Southey's read, and Wordsworth understood,
I can't help putting in my claim to praise –
The four first rhymes are Southey's every line:
For God's sake, reader! take them not for mine.

From Constance Naden's A Modern Apostle (1887)

For she, with innocent clear sight, had found
That those about her merely thought of thinking,
And felt they ought to feel; with quick rebound
She drew her life away from theirs, and shrinking
From windy verbiage, craved some solid ground,
Trying to satisfy her soul by linking
Truths abstract; no vague talk of liberal views
Can alter cosine and hypotenuse.

From Anthony Burgess's Byrne: A Novel

He thought he was a kind of living myth
And hence deserving of ottava rima,
The scheme that Ariosto juggled with,
Apt for a lecherous defective dreamer.
He'd have preferred a stronger-muscled smith,
Anvilling rhymes amid poetic steam, a
Sort of Lord Byron. Byron was long dead.
This poetaster had to do instead.

From Emma Lazarus's An Epistle

Master and Sage, greetings and health to thee,
From thy most meek disciple! Deign once more
Endure me at thy feet, enlighten me,
As when upon my boyish head of yore,
Midst the rapt circle gathered round thy knee
Thy sacred vials of learning thou didst pour.
By the large lustre of thy wisdom orbed
Be my black doubts illumined and absorbed.

=== Other languages ===
The Spanish poets Boscán, Alonso de Ercilla y Zúñiga and Lope de Vega all experimented with ottava rima at one time or another. It is also the meter of several medieval Yiddish epic poems, such as the Bovo-Bukh (1507–1508), which were adaptations of Italian epics.

In Russia, Pavel Katenin instigated a high-profile dispute on the proper way of translating Italian epics, which resulted in Alexander Pushkin's ottava rima poem "The Little House in Kolomna" (1830), which took its cue from Lord Byron's Beppo. Pushkin's poem opens with a lengthy tongue-in-cheek discussion of the merits of ottava rima.

In Germany (or other German-speaking countries) ottava rima occurred not so often as in Italy, but was used in long works. Paul Heyse, a Nobel Prize laureate for the year 1910, used it in his poems (Die Braut von Cypern). Rainer Maria Rilke, regarded as the greatest German language lyric poet of the 20th century, wrote Winterliche Stanzen in ABABABCC scheme.

Nun sollen wir versagte Tage lange
ertragen in des Widerstandes Rinde;
uns immer wehrend, nimmer an der Wange
das Tiefe fühlend aufgetaner Winde.
Die Nacht ist stark, doch von so fernem Gange,
die schwache Lampe überredet linde.
Laß dichs getrösten: Frost und Harsch bereiten
die Spannung künftiger Empfänglichkeiten.

Luís de Camões's 16th-century epic Os Lusíadas, the most important epic in the Portuguese language, is not only one of the longest poems written in ottava rima (it consists of 1,102 stanzas), but is recognized as one of the great epics of European literature.

As armas e os barões assinalados,
Que da ocidental praia Lusitana,
Por mares nunca de antes navegados,
Passaram ainda além da Taprobana,
Em perigos e guerras esforçados,
Mais do que prometia a força humana,
E entre gente remota edificaram
Novo Reino, que tanto sublimaram;

— Luís Vaz de Camões, Os Lusíadas, 1-8
Translation:

The feats of Arms, and famed heroick Host,
from occidental Lusitanian strand,
who o'er the waters ne'er by seaman crost,
farèd beyond the Taprobáne-land,
forceful in perils and in battle-post,
with more than promised force of mortal hand;
and in the regions of a distant race
rear'd a new throne so haught in Pride of Place:

— Translated by Richard Francis Burton

Camões was not the only Portuguese poet to use ottava rima. Many Portuguese and Brazilian poets wrote great epic poems using the stanza, for example Gabriel Pereira de Castro (1571–1632): Ulisseia ou Lisboa Edificada (1636), Vasco Mouzinho de Quevedo (16th/17th century): Afonso Africano, Francisco de Sá de Meneses (1600–1664): Malaca Conquistada (1634), António de Sousa Macedo (1606–1682): Ulissipo (1640), Brás Garcia de Mascarenhas: Viriato Trágico and José de Santa Rita Durão (1722–1784): Caramuru (1781).

Ottava rima was very popular in the Polish literature of the 17th century, which was under strong influence of Italian poetry. The scheme ABABABCC was introduced into Polish poetry by Sebastian Grabowiecki and made widespread by Piotr Kochanowski, who translated Jerusalem Delivered by Torquato Tasso. It was used by Jan Andrzej Morsztyn, Stanisław Herakliusz Lubomirski, Wespazjan Kochowski, Samuel Twardowski and Wacław Potocki. During The Enlightenment bishop and poet Ignacy Krasicki wrote his mock-epics (Monachomachia, Antymonachomachia and Myszeida) in ottava rima. In the beginning of 19th century Dyzma Bończa-Tomaszewski attempted to write a national epic Jagiellonida. His work, however, is not longer remembered. Later Juliusz Słowacki, one of the greatest romantic poets, wrote two long poems, Beniowski and Król Duch (King Spirit), using the stanza. Another important attempt to write a modern epic poem in ottava rima was Maria Konopnicka's Pan Balcer w Brazylii (Mr. Balcer in Brazil). Poems written in ottava rima are usually translated into Polish in the same form. Lately La Araucana by Alonso de Ercilla was translated in such a way by Czesław Ratka.

In Czech poetry, Jaroslav Vrchlický, generally considered to be the greatest poet of the second half of 19th century, used ottava rima several times, for example in short poem Odpověď (An Answer) that is composed of only two stanzas. Vrchlický was well trained in the use of the stanza as he translated Ludovico Ariosto's Orlando Furioso (Roland Enraged) into Czech.

In Slovenian literature ottava rima was used by France Prešeren, the greatest romantic poet, sometimes, among others, in Krst pri Savici (The Baptism on the Savica), that is considered to be a national epic of Slovenian people. Prologue to the poem is written in terza rima.

In Danish literature ottava rima was used by Frederik Paludan-Müller and others. He used the stanza in his long poem, Adam Homo. The poet implemented the scheme freely and often used, for example, the sequence ABABBACC instead of ABABABCC.

In Swedish poetry ottava rima was used by Esaias Tegnér in his epic Frithiof's Saga.

In Finnish literature ottava rima was used by Eino Leino in some parts of book Juhana Herttuan ja Catharina Jagellonican lauluja (Songs of Prince John and Catherine the Jagellonian).
