= Viriato Trágico (poem) =

Poem by Brás Garcia de Mascarenhas

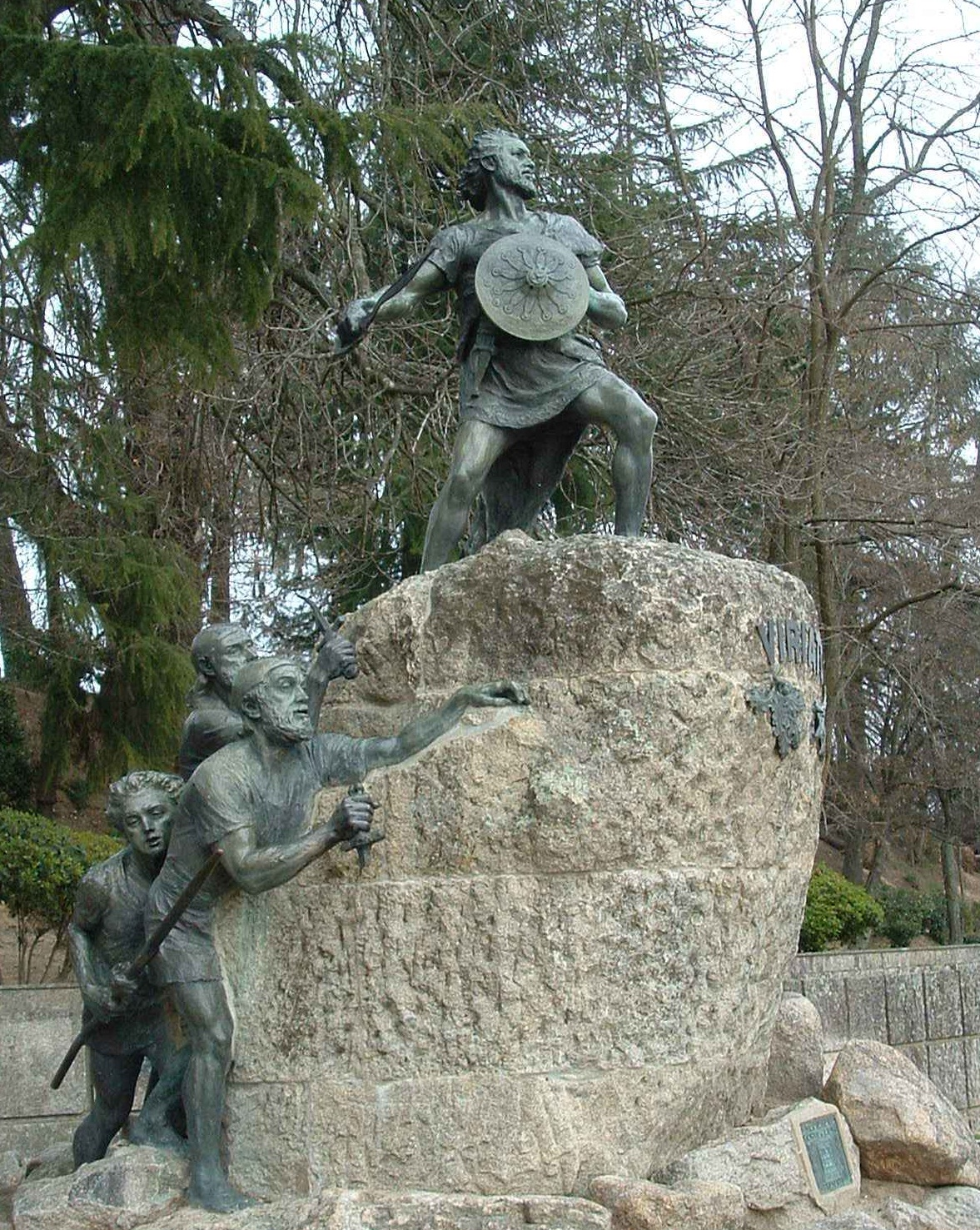
Viriatus's monument in Viseu

Viriato Trágico is an epic poem by Portuguese author Brás Garcia de Mascarenhas.

== General information ==
Viriato Trágico is a long poem, consisting of twenty cantos. It was published posthumously in 1699. It is one of the most important epic poems written in Portuguese. The main hero of the poem is Viriatus. Aubrey F.G. Bell, the author of the history Portuguese literature, wrote that the poem "contains some forcible descriptions and has a pleasantly patriotic and indigenous atmosphere".

== Author ==
Brás Garcia de Mascarenhas (1595–1656) was a soldier and poet. He was a hero of the war of independence against the Spain.

== Form ==
The poem, like many other epic works of 17th-century Portuguese literature, is written in ottava rima (oitava rima in Portuguese). This eight-line stanza of Italian origin is composed of hendecasyllabic lines rhymed abababcc. The form was introduced into epic poetry by Giovanni Boccaccio in the 14th century. Soon it became very popular in Italy. In the beginning of the 16th century Francisco de Sá de Miranda, returning home from a stay in Italy, imported it into Portuguese poetry. This stanza was chosen by Luís de Camões for his Lusiads. Many other poets used this form in the 17th century, including Vasco Mouzinho de Quevedo, Gabriel Pereira de Castro, António de Sousa de Macedo, Francisco Rodrigues Lobo, and Francisco de Sá de Meneses.

The poem begins:

Canto um Pastor, Amores, e Armas canto,
Canto o Raio do monte, e da campanha,
Terror da Itália, e do mundo espanto,
Glória de Portugal, honra de Espanha:
Triunfante da Águia, que triunfando tanto,
Tanto a seus raios tímida se acanha,
Que à traição, só dormindo, o viu rendido,
Porque desperto nunca foi vencido.

== Story ==
The poem tells the story of Viriatus. He was a warrior from Iberia who waged war against the Romans in the 2nd century BC. According to Diodorus Siculus, a Greek historian, Viriatus came from Lusitania, that is, from ancient Portugal. He became the leader of an army and remained invincible for a long time. The Romans could not defeat him in any battle, so they decided to assassinate him. He was stabbed to death during his sleep. Only then did Iberia become a Roman province. Viriatus died, but his fame outlived not only him, but the Roman Empire too.

== Bibliography ==
- Viriato tragico, poema heroico em 20 cantos de Braz Garcia Mascaranhas, Lisboa 1816.
