= Gabriel Pereira =

Gabriel Pereira may refer to:

- Gabriel Pereira de Castro (1571–1632), Portuguese priest, lawyer and poet
- Gabriel Antonio Pereira (1794–1861), Uruguayan politician
- Gabriel Pereira (footballer, born 1997), Gabriel Pereira da Silva, Brazilian football forward for União Suzano
- Gabriel Pereira (footballer, born 2000), Gabriel Pereira Magalhães dos Santos, Brazilian football centre-back for Gil Vicente
- Gabriel Pereira (footballer, born 2001), Gabriel Pereira dos Santos, Brazilian football midfielder for New York City FC

== See also ==
- Gabriel Pereyra (born 1978), Argentine football coach and former player
