= Camões Monument =

Portuguese Monument

Camões Monument Portuguese: Monumento a Camões
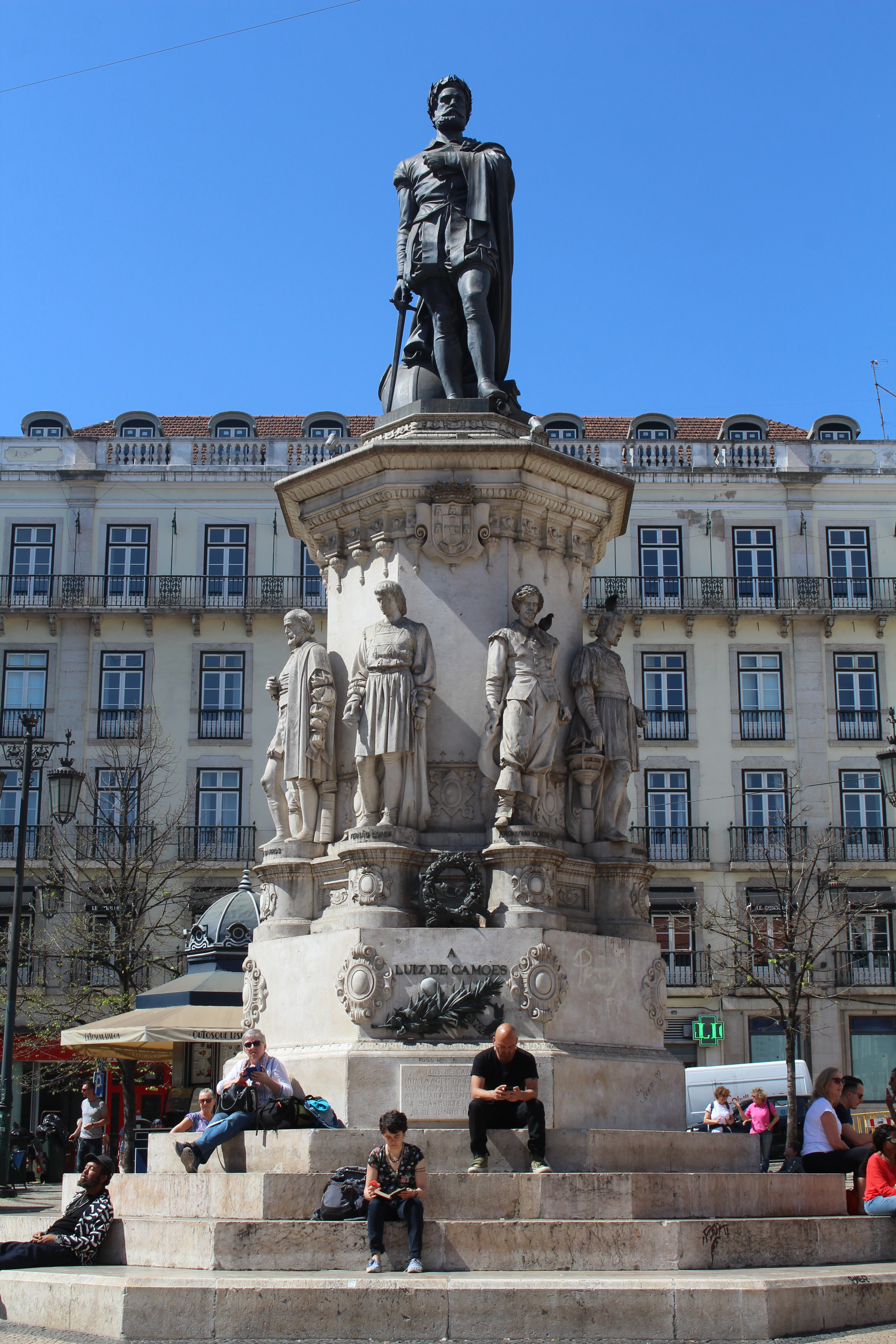
- The Camões Monument in 2019
- Location: Luís de Camões Square, Lisbon, Portugal
- Coordinates: 38.7105°N 9.1434°W
- Sculptor: Victor Bastos

The Camões Monument (Portuguese: Monumento a Camões) is a monument located in Luís de Camões Square in the Chiado neighbourhood of Lisbon, Portugal. The monument comprises a tall bronze statue of Luís de Camões, the national poet, on a lioz limestone pillar surrounded by eight smaller statues of leading figures of Portuguese culture and literature in the Age of Discoveries: Fernão Lopes, Pedro Nunes, Gomes Eanes de Zurara, João de Barros, Fernão Lopes de Castanheda, Vasco Mouzinho de Quevedo, Jerónimo Corte-Real, and Francisco de Sá de Meneses.

The monument was sculpted by Victor Bastos and unveiled in 1867, in the presence of King Luís I and his father, Ferdinand II.

== History ==
The first proposal to dedicate a monument to Camões dates to the beginning of the 19th century, following the publication of the 1817 luxury edition of The Lusiads sponsored by the Morgado of Mateus, in Paris. A commission to raise the necessary funds was established, presided by the Portuguese Ambassador in Paris, the Marquis of Marialva. This first attempt was doomed to fail, after it earned the grudge of some sectors of the Portuguese public when it became apparent that foreign artists were being considered to design it.

The matter lay dormant until 1855, the year when the remains of the poet — that had been lost since the 1755 Lisbon earthquake destroyed the old Convent of Saint Anne in which he was known to have been interred in 1580 — were tentatively (and probably mistakenly) identified. The idea to memorialise Camões grew increasingly popular. Victor Bastos, a substitute professor at the Academy of Fine Arts and popular sculptor hurried to publicly submit a project for the a monument in 1859, which was very well received. A Central Commission to raise funds for the monument's construction was established, made up of prominent names: the Duke of Saldanha (its President), the Count of Farrobo, the Viscount of Juromenha, businessman José Maria Eugénio de Almeida, the Viscount of Meneses, Francisco Augusto Metrass, António Feliciano de Castilho, and José da Silva Mendes Leal. The project soon secured sufficient subscriptions for the project, with a substantial contribution from the Portuguese diaspora in Brazil.

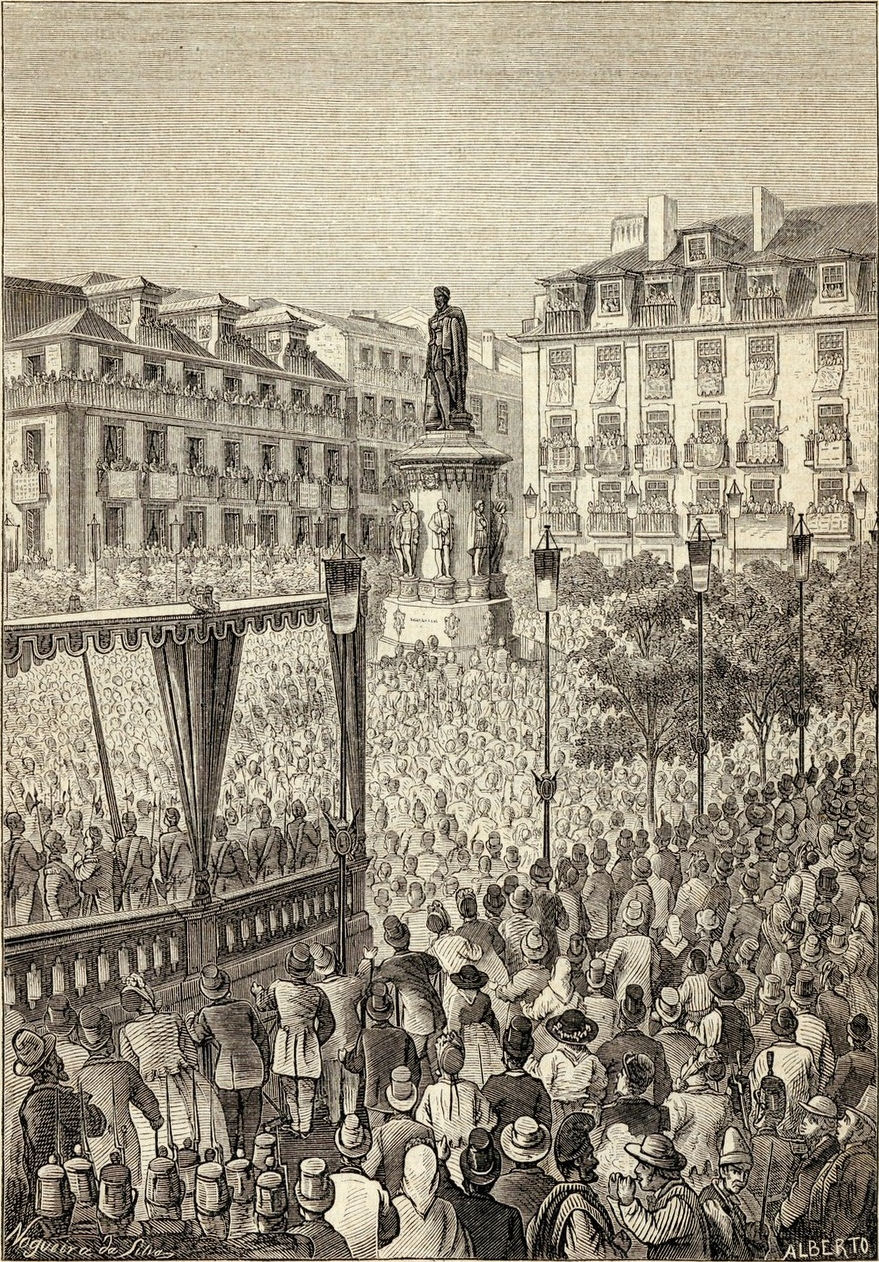
The unveiling of the Camões Monument, 1867

The site chosen to erect the monument in the fashionable neighbourhood of Chiado, the Praça do Loreto (Loreto Square; thus known for its proximity to the Igreja do Loreto) was accordingly renamed Praça de Luís de Camões (Luís de Camões Square) by the City Council. The square had previously been the site of a 17th-century palace of the Marquesses of Marialva that had been ruined in the 1755 earthquake.

The foundation stone was ceremoniously set by King Luís I on 28 June 1862; on 9 October 1867, the same monarch solemnly unveiled the statue.

In the late 19th century, the monument became the focus of important patriotic manifestations as Camões, in the Romantic spirit, was hailed as a symbol of the "heroic age", a paragon of "all the aspirations of the Portuguese nation, its glories and tragedies". Particularly notable were the highly politicised official tricentennial celebrations of Camões's death in 1880, a key moment in the consecration of Camões as a symbol of nationhood. Following the 1890 British Ultimatum, seen as an outrageous national humiliation, the monument was covered in black crêpe.

== Description ==
The statue, in cast bronze, is 4 metres (13 ft) tall and weighs approximately 9,700 kilograms (21,400 lb). Camões is depicted aged around 50; he stands in elegant pose, garbed in court dress (jerkin, padded hose, stockings, and a cape) and gazing directly ahead with an expression of gravity. His extended right arm holds an unsheathed sword and his left arm holds a copy of The Lusiads to his chest; on his feet lie a breastplate and a pile of books.

The pedestal on which the figure of Camões stands is 7.48 metres (24.5 ft) tall and is made of lioz limestone; it has eight faces and, on each angle, a plinth over which stands a smaller statue. Each statue stands at 4 metres (13 ft). These eight smaller statues depict leading figures of Portuguese culture of the Age of Discoveries: historian Fernão Lopes, cosmographer Pedro Nunes, chroniclers Gomes Eanes de Zurara, João de Barros, and Fernão Lopes de Castanheda, and epic poets Vasco Mouzinho de Quevedo, Jerónimo Corte-Real, and Francisco de Sá de Meneses.

With the exception of João de Barros, whose likeness was taken from a portrait published in Manuel Severim de Faria's 1624 Discursos Varios Politicos (which also includes a portrait of Camões), all other figures on the monument were imagined and idealised by sculptor Victor Bastos, as no contemporary portraits could be found.

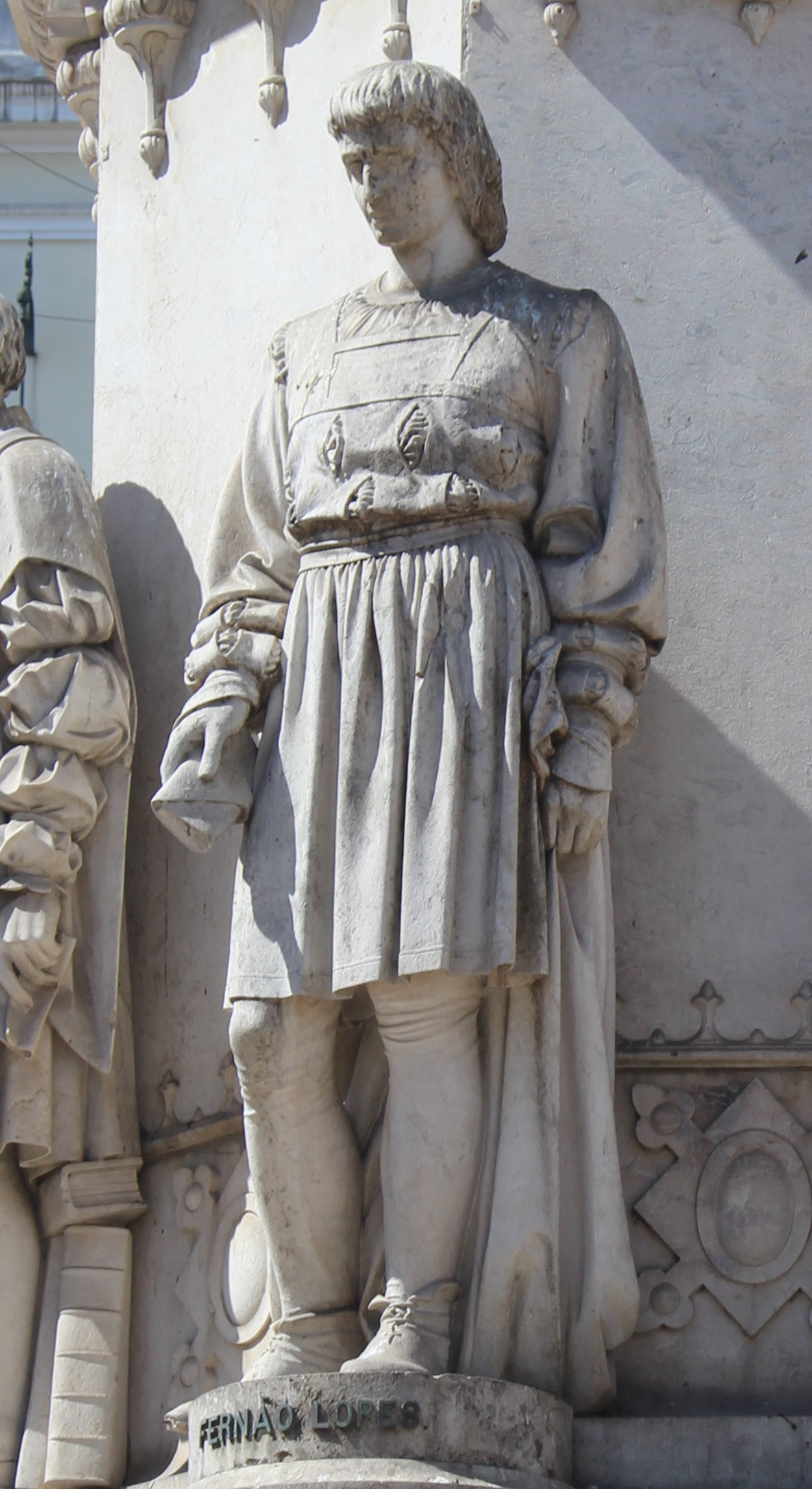
Fernão Lopes

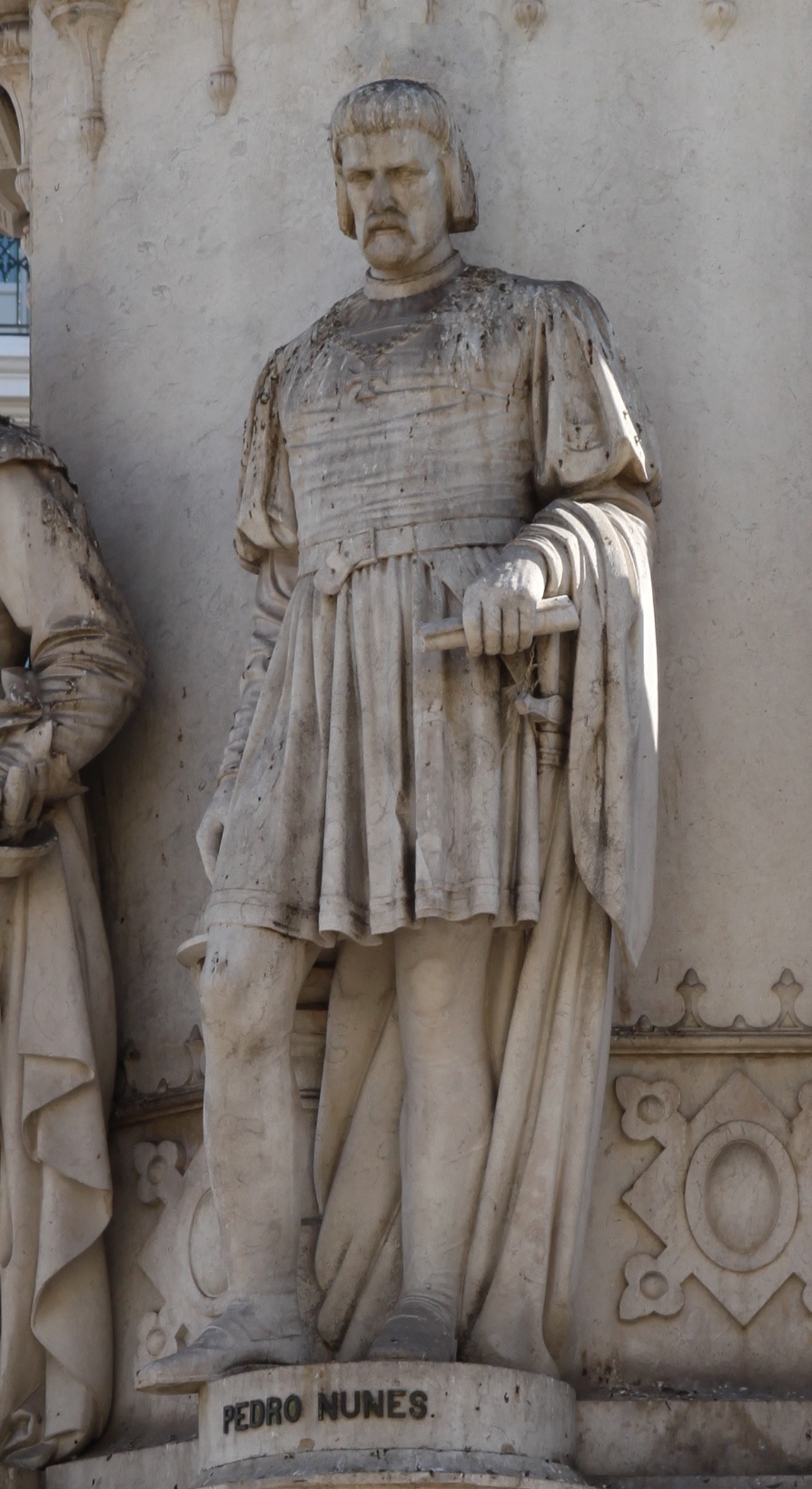
Pedro Nunes

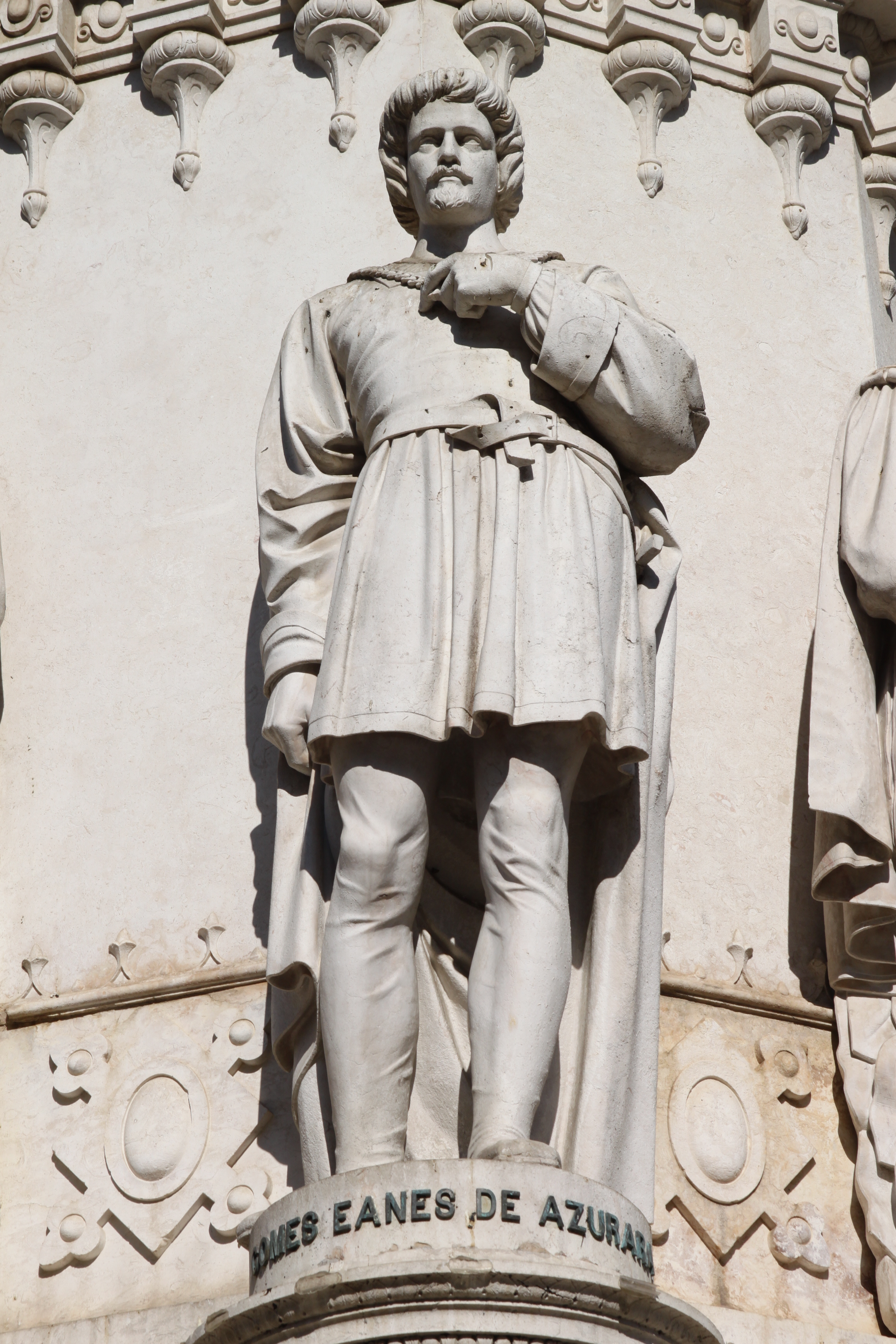
Gomes Eanes de Zurara

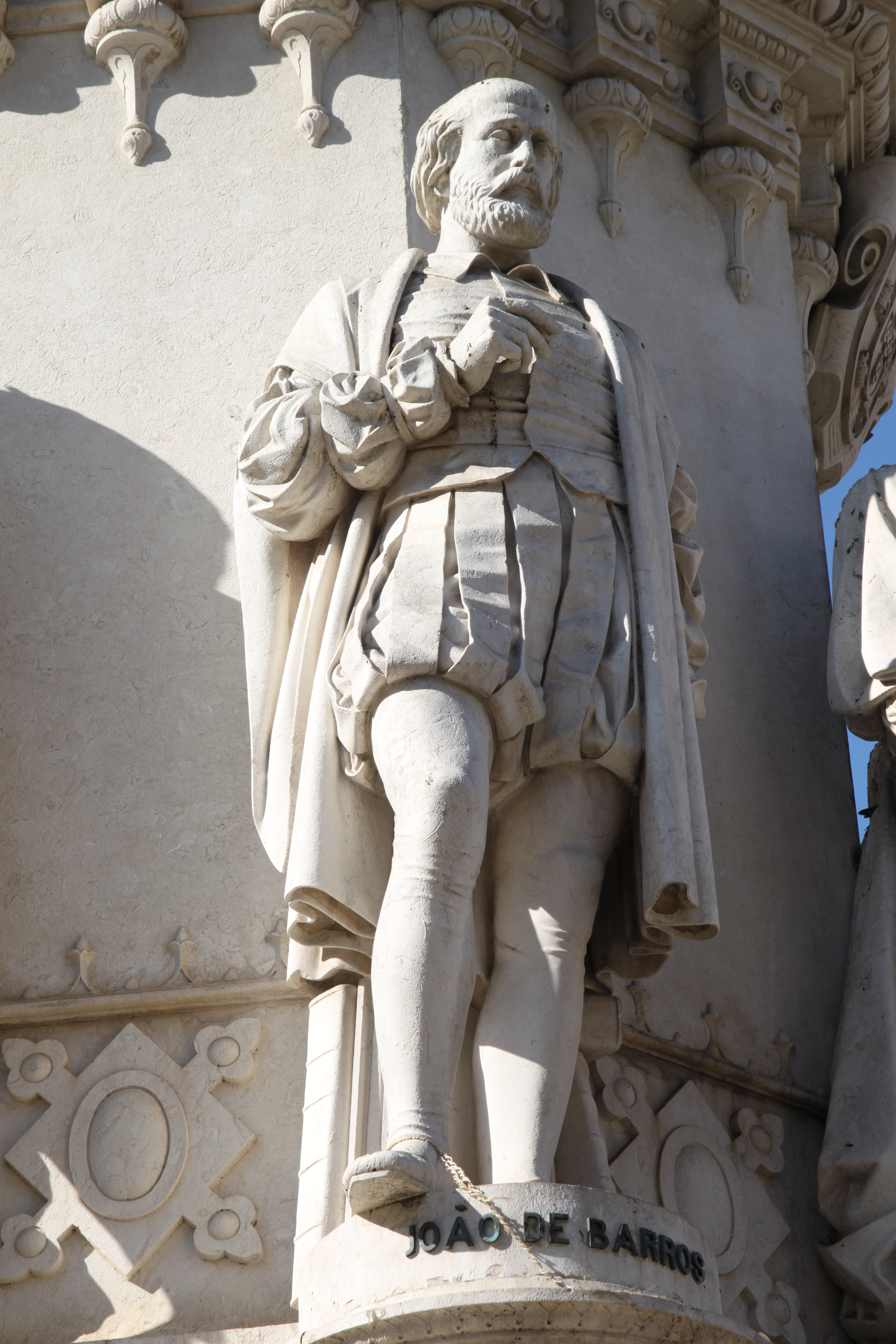
João de Barros

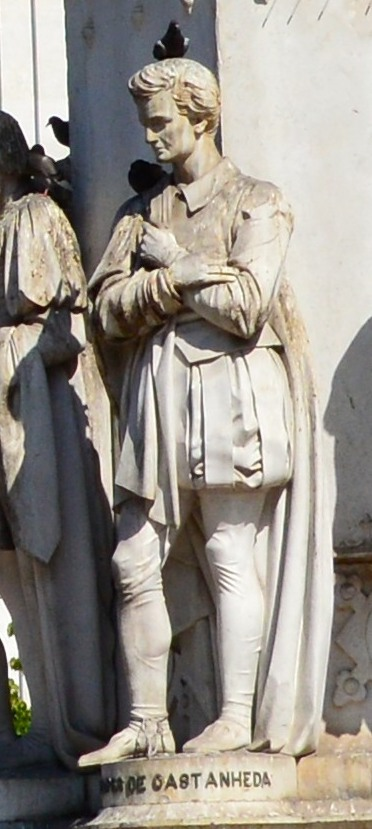
Fernão Lopes de Castanheda

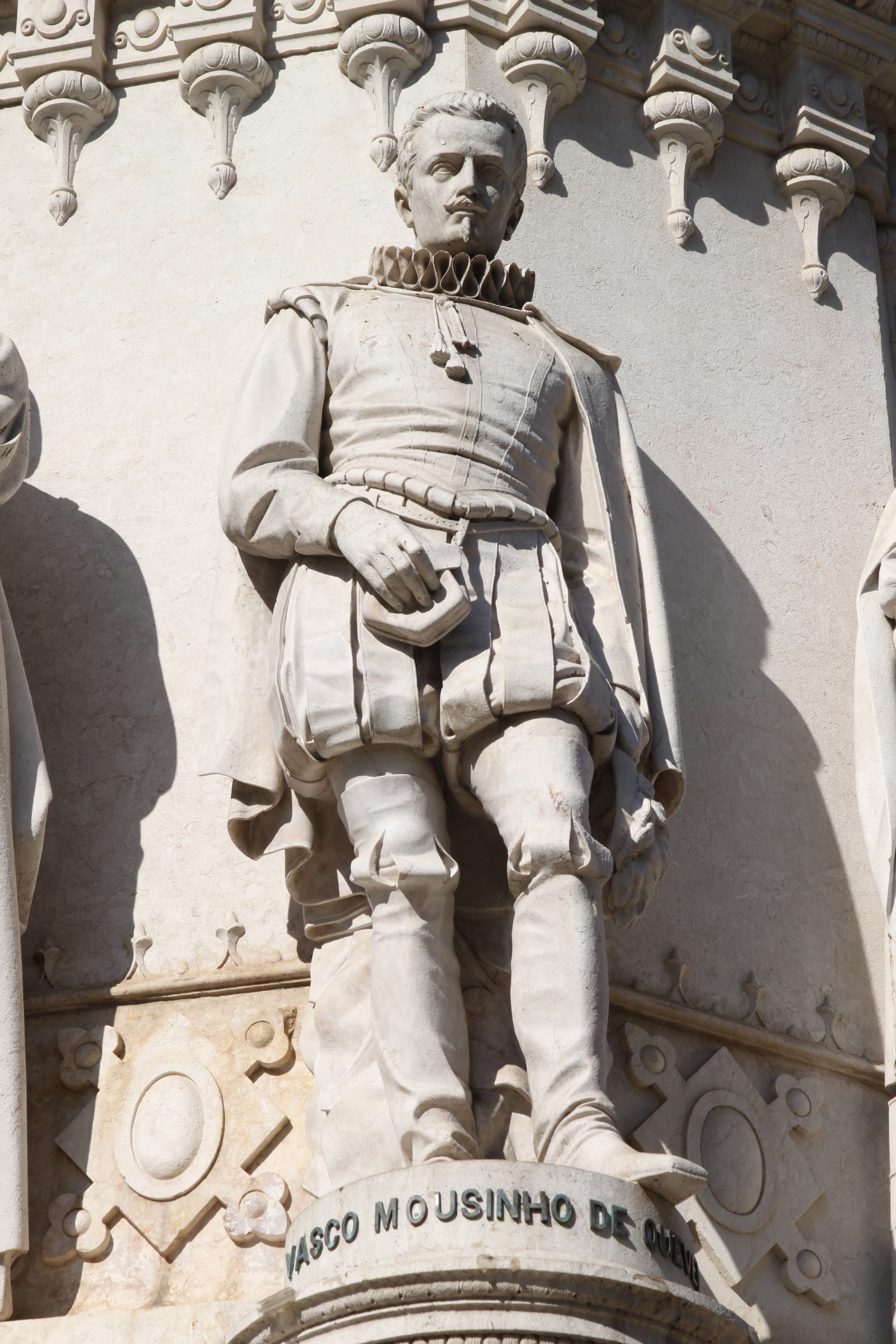
Vasco Mouzinho de Quevedo

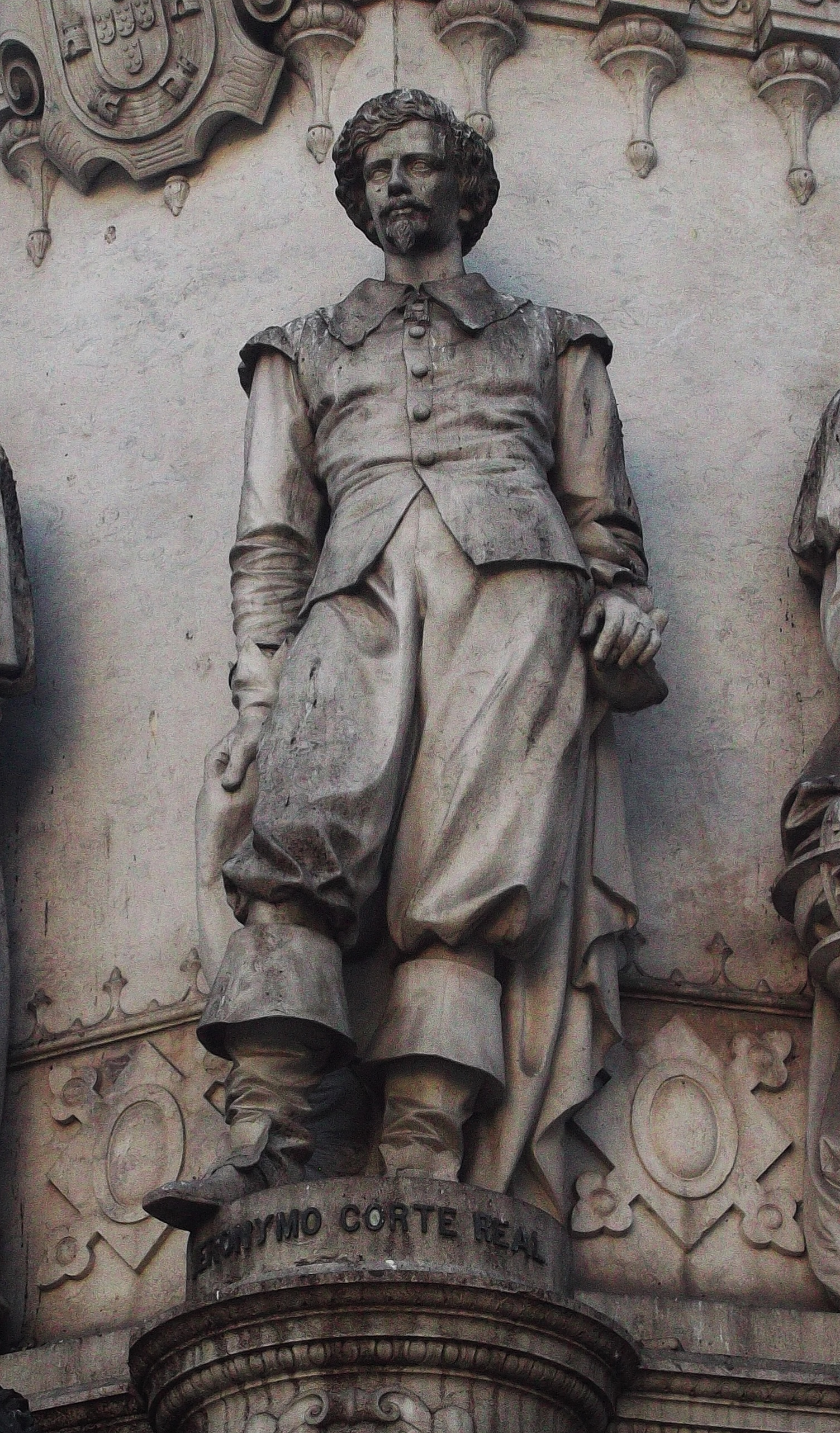
Jerónimo Corte-Real

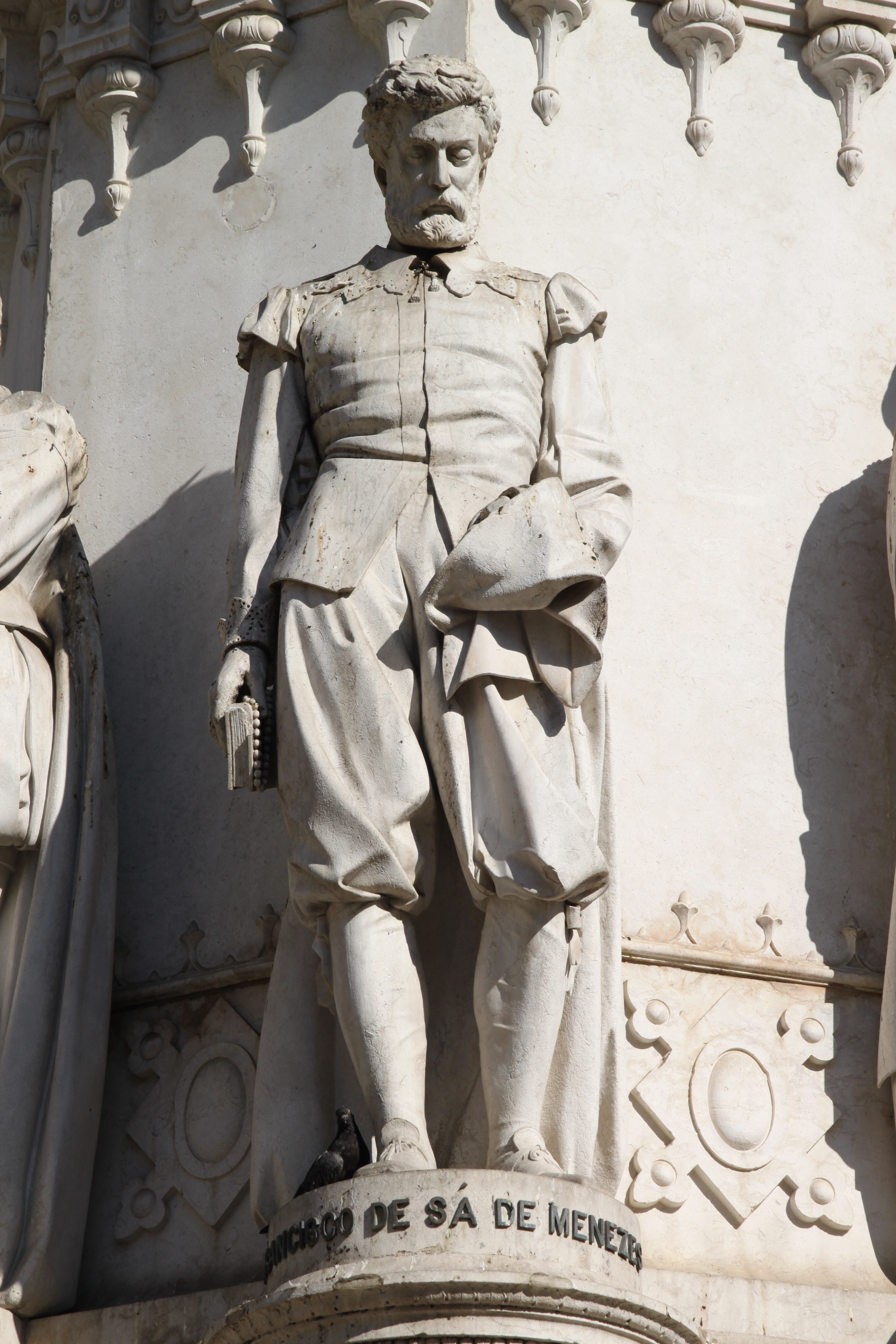
Francisco de Sá de Meneses
