= Casa Bianca Plantation =

Coordinates: 30°31′12″N 83°53′33″W

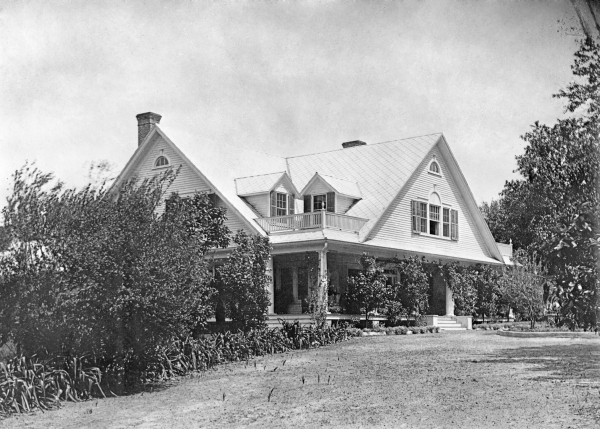
Casa Bianca main house - Jefferson County, Florida

Casa Bianca was an antebellum cotton plantation established in 1828 in Jefferson County, Florida, US. It was created by Joseph Mills White (1781–1839) and his business partner Richard H. Wilde (1789–1847), both delegates of the United States House of Representatives, and was located off of what is today Jefferson County Road 259 southwest of Monticello, Florida. Casa Bianca was originally intended to serve as a sugar cane plantation, but transitioned to cotton production with the rise of cotton as the primary agricultural commodity in Florida in the 1830s. The plantation sourced slaves from New Orleans, brought there aboard a ship naned Antelope, a purchase with the former United States President James Monroe, and from Joseph M. White's brother, Everett White. There were a total of 163 slaves at the Casa Bianca Plantation and at its largest, it spanned 3,000 acres (1,200 hectares).

== Establishment and ownership ==
Casa Bianca Plantation- Jefferson County, Florida

In 1827, White bought 1,125 acres (455 ha) of land from the Government and ten slaves who were shipped from New Orleans to Pensacola. This group of slaves was mostly mothers and their children who likely worked for White as domestic servants because the sugar cane they were planning to grow and harvest was too labor-intensive for these slaves to work with. The same year, Wilde was representing a party in, US v. The Antelope and used his political power and influence to purchase 37 slaves. In 1828, he made a deal with former president James Monroe who was in debt from his presidency and his own failing plantations. White gave Monroe $5,000 in exchange for three families and one 9-year-old girl named Mary Brown, who were shipped from Monroe's "Highland" plantation in Virginia to Florida. The shipment of these families separated from the connections they made in Virginia and the young Mary Brown was violently seized from her family. In 1835, Joseph White bought 13 slaves from his brother's plantation after his brother's death, further adding to the slave population of Casa Bianca. Joseph M. White died in 1839, leaving his property to his wife Ellen Adair White. She continued her ownership of the land until she sold it in 1860.

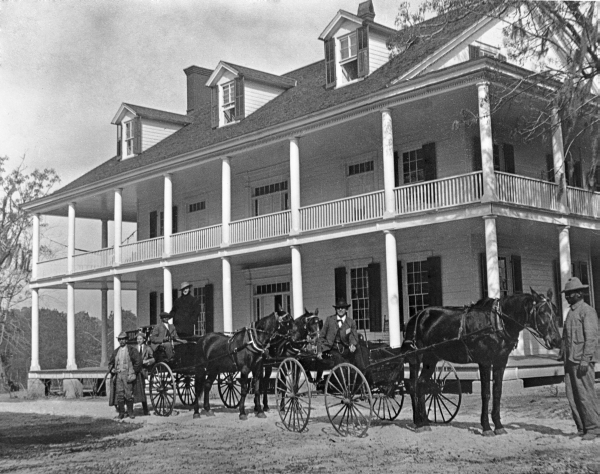
Casa Bianca hunting party wagons- Jefferson County, Florida

== Life at Casa Bianca ==
Research compiled from the Take Them In Families dataset has proven 163 enslaved people to have lived and labored at Casa Bianca, but up to 407 people have found as ancestors of the enslaved at Casa Bianca. The experience of the enslaved who were shipped to Florida against their will is imaginably traumatic, but the conditions they went through during their time at Casa Blanca likely exacerbated this stress. Displaced Indians raided around Monticello, and slaves from Casa Bianca were sent to Monticello for aid. The county suffered malaria and yellow fever outbreaks, affecting the slaves there as well.

== Emancipation and reconstruction ==
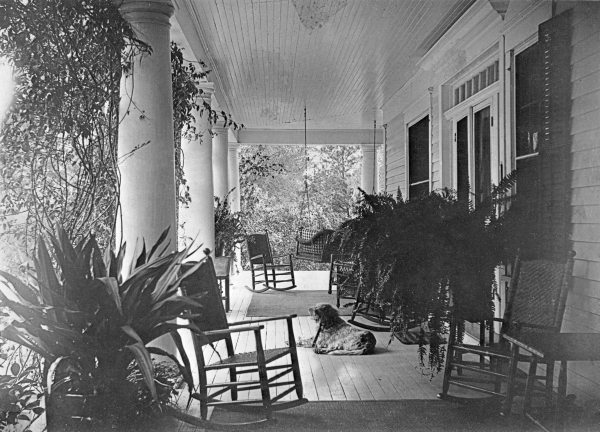
Casa Bianca front porch - Jefferson County, Florida

After Joseph M. White's death in 1839 and his wife selling Casa Bianca in 1860, 82 slaves were sold to a Tallahassee lawyer named Robert W. Williams who sent them to his plantation in Louisiana, splitting up families to do so. She sold the remaining 38 slaves to her nephew, James Patton Anderson, who helped his aunt manage Casa Bianca for four years before she sold it. These 38 slaves remained in Jefferson County until they were emancipated and the Federal County Census for Jefferson County after emancipation includes the names of some of the saves who were bought by Robert W. Williams and presumably sent to Louisiana, but in reality may not have been shipped there before they were emancipated. After emancipation, the formerly enslaved population at Casa Bianca who remained in Jefferson County built new lives for themselves and former slaves along with their descendants created the Casa Bianca Missionary Baptist Church near the plantation, which remains in use today.
