= Dyzma =

Dyzma is a male given name of Polish origin. The name may refer to:

- Dyzma Bończa-Tomaszewski (1749–1825), Polish poet, writer and playwright
- Dyzma Gałaj (1915–2000), Polish sociologist and politician
- The Career of Nicodemus Dyzma, a novel
  - Career of Nikos Dyzma, a film based on the novel
