= Jerónimo Corte-Real =

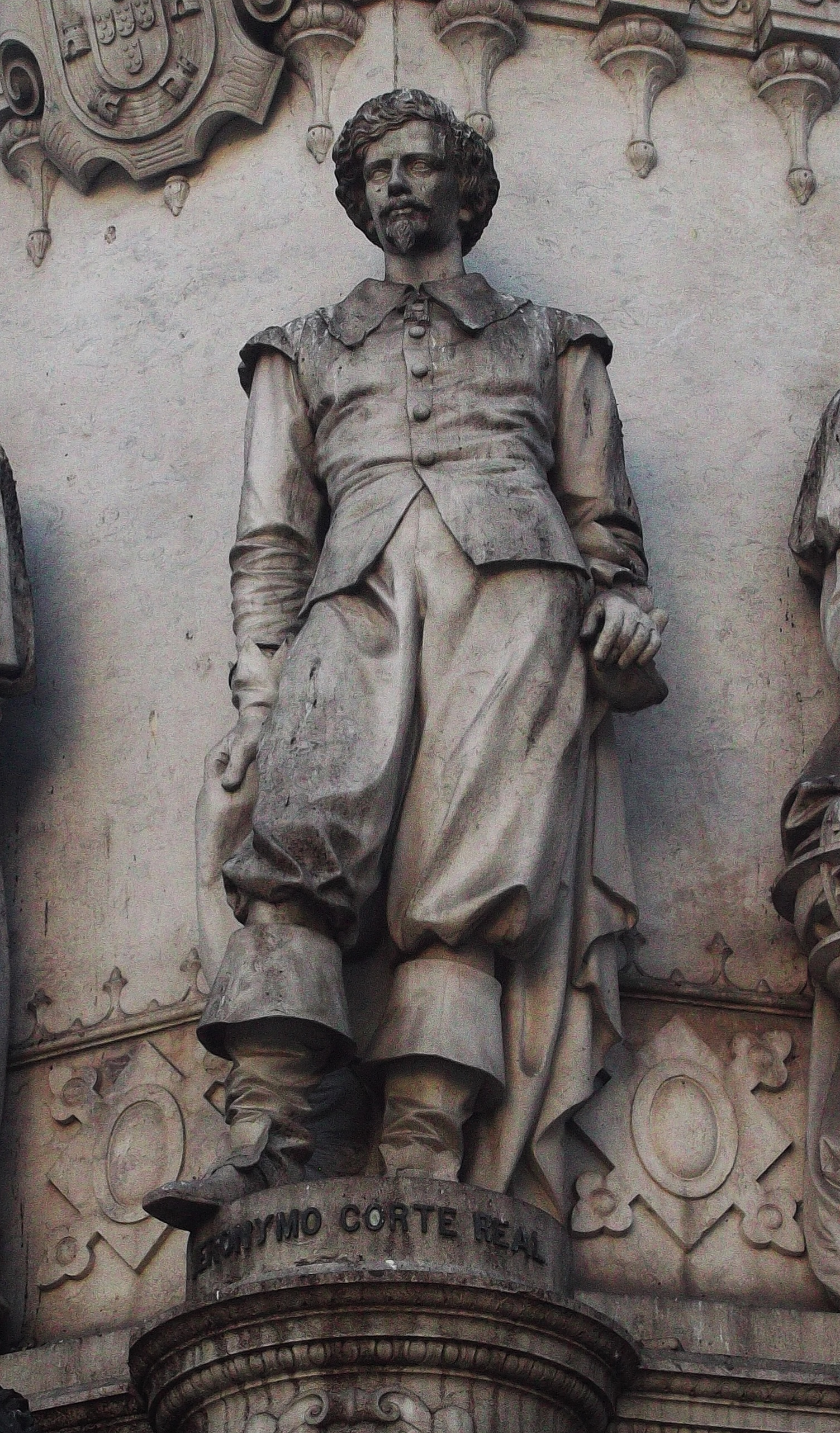
- Born: 1533; Azores, Kingdom of Portugal
- Died: 1588 (aged 54–55); Évora, Kingdom of Portugal
- Occupation: Epic poet

Jerónimo Corte-Real (1533–1588) was a Portuguese epic poet, who was of noble Portuguese stock. He is sometimes regarded as the Portuguese Virgil.

== Life ==
Jerónimo was born in the Azores; from the same Corte-Real family as Gaspar Corte-Real, who in 1500 and 1501 (along with his brothers Miguel and Vasco) sailed to Labrador and the Arctic seas. Their voyages opened the way for important Portuguese fisheries on the Newfoundland coast.

In his youth Jerónimo fought in Africa and Asia according to the custom of noblemen in that age. There is a tradition that he was present at the affair of Tangier on 18 May 1553, when Dom Pedro de Menezes met his death. Returning home, it is supposed about 1570, he spent the rest of his days in retirement.

In 1578 he placed his sword at the disposal of King Sebastian for the fatal expedition to Africa. Still, the monarch dispensed him from the journey (it is said) on account of his age. In 1586 we find him acting as Provedor (chairman) of the Misericórdia of Évora. He married D. Luísa da Silva, but left no legitimate issue.

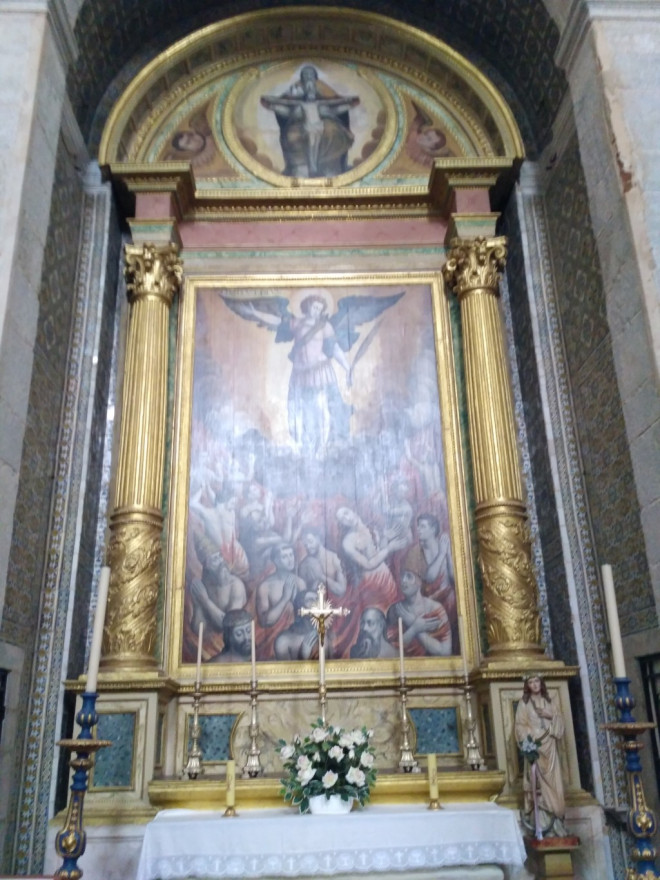
"São Miguel e as Suas Almas" ("Saint Michael and his souls") by Jerónimo Corte Real, at the church of Santo Antão, Évora, Portugal . Dated 1570-90

Corte-Real was a painter as well as soldier and poet, and one of his pictures "Almas" is still preserved in the church of S. Antão at Évora. His poetical works are believed to have been composed in his retirement at the mansion on his estate near Évora, known as Valle de Palma.

He was buried in Évora on 16 November 1588.

== Works ==
O Segundo cerco de Diu (The Second Siege of Diu), an epic in 21 cantos, deals with the historic siege of that Indian island-fortress of the Portuguese. First printed in 1574, it had a second edition in 1783, while a Spanish version appeared at Alcalà in 1597. Austriada, an epic in 15 cantos celebrating the victory of John of Austria (Don Juan de Austria) over the Turks at Lepanto, was written in Spanish and published in 1578. King Philip II accepted the dedication in flattering terms and visited the poet when he came to Portugal.

Naufrágio de Sepulveda (The Shipwreck of Sepulveda), an epic in 17 cantos, describes the tragic shipwreck on the South African coast and the death of D. Manuel de Sepulveda with his beautiful wife and young children, a disaster which drew some feeling stanzas from Camões (Lusiads, v. 46). The poem was published four years after the death of Corte-Real by his heirs, and had two later editions, while a Spanish version appeared in Madrid in 1624 and a French in Paris in 1844. Auto dos quatro novíssimos do homem is a short poem printed in 1768.

Except the Naufragio de Sepulveda, which is highly considered in Portugal, Corte-Real's poetry has hardly stood the test of time, and critics of later generations have refused to ratify the estimate formed by contemporaries, who considered him, at least, the equal, if not the superior, of Camões. His lengthy epics suffer from a want of sustained inspiration, and are marred by an abuse of epithet, though they contain episodes of considerable merit, vigorous and well-coloured descriptive passages, and exhibit a pure diction.

See Subsídios para a biographia do poeta Jeronymo Corte-Real (Évora, 1899); also Ernesto do Canto's Memoir on the family in Nos. 23 and 24 of the Archivo dos Azores, and Dr Sousa Viterbo's Trabalhos nauticos dos Portuguezes, ii. 153 et seq.
