= Hesperia (poem) =

Hesperia: A Poem is a lengthy verse volume by Richard Henry Wilde (1789–1847), an Irish-American lawyer, and first edited and published by his son in 1867. The title work is described as "a nationalistic poem in four cantos", named as "Florida", "Virginia", "Acadia", and "Louisiana"; and as "one of the few full-length poems by early southern writers".

== Content ==
The Oxford Companion to American Literature, fourth edition, described Hesperia as "a long poem in Tom Moore's vein." The Encyclopedia of American Poetry: The Nineteenth Century calls it "part epic, part Byronesque narrative in the manner of Childe Harold, part autobiography and part philosophic essay." It is written in ottava rima.

== Dedication ==
Hesperia is dedicated to a fictitious "Marchesa Manfredina di Cosenza". Tucker points out that the name derives from Manfredi di Cosenza, mentioned in the Purgatorio of Dante. In the Dedication, the title Hesperia is explained, as to an Italian: from the Greek, it implies the westward land (from the literal evening star), and so Italy. But also it is to apply to America, further to the west.

Tucker accepts the identification of the dedicatee made by Aubrey H. Starke, as Ellen Adair White (Mrs. White Beatty). She was Eleanor Katherine Adair, a daughter of John Adair, who married Joseph M. White, and after his 1839 death as a result of a duel, Theophilus Beatty.

Another suggestion, made by Wright, is that the Marchesa, addressed as "Mary", stands for Maria Robbins (1806–1869), English wife of the Italian Marchese Lorenzo Bartolommei of Florence. She was widowed in 1836, the year in which Wilde settled for about four years in Florence, and they were rumoured to be intending to marry, though nothing came of it. She was the sister of the Rev. George Robbins.

Arguing that Ellen Adair White is referred to in the fourth canto of Hesperia, by means of the name of her parental home, and that Wilde was in love with her as a married woman, Graber then finds a crux. "Why Wilde did not marry Mrs. White-Beatty after the death of her first husband is still a mystery."

== Pseudonym and notes ==
All the indications are that Wilde was chary of publishing literary work under his own name, considering that a reputation as an author could damage his reputation as a lawyer. His intention was that Hesperia should be published under the pseudonym "FitzHugh de Lancy". The book publication, 20 years after his death, subverted the pseudonym by the device of a doubled title page, one page showing his real name.

The manuscript of the poem also allowed for a threefold system of notes. They comprised: ordinary expository and citation-based notes by "de Lancy"; first-person notes by "de Lancy" addressed to the "Marchesa"; and notes by a putative editor, supposedly after the death of "de Lancy" and the passing to "M." of the manuscript.
