= Santa Catarina Palace =

Manor of Santa Catarina
- Solar de Santa Catarina
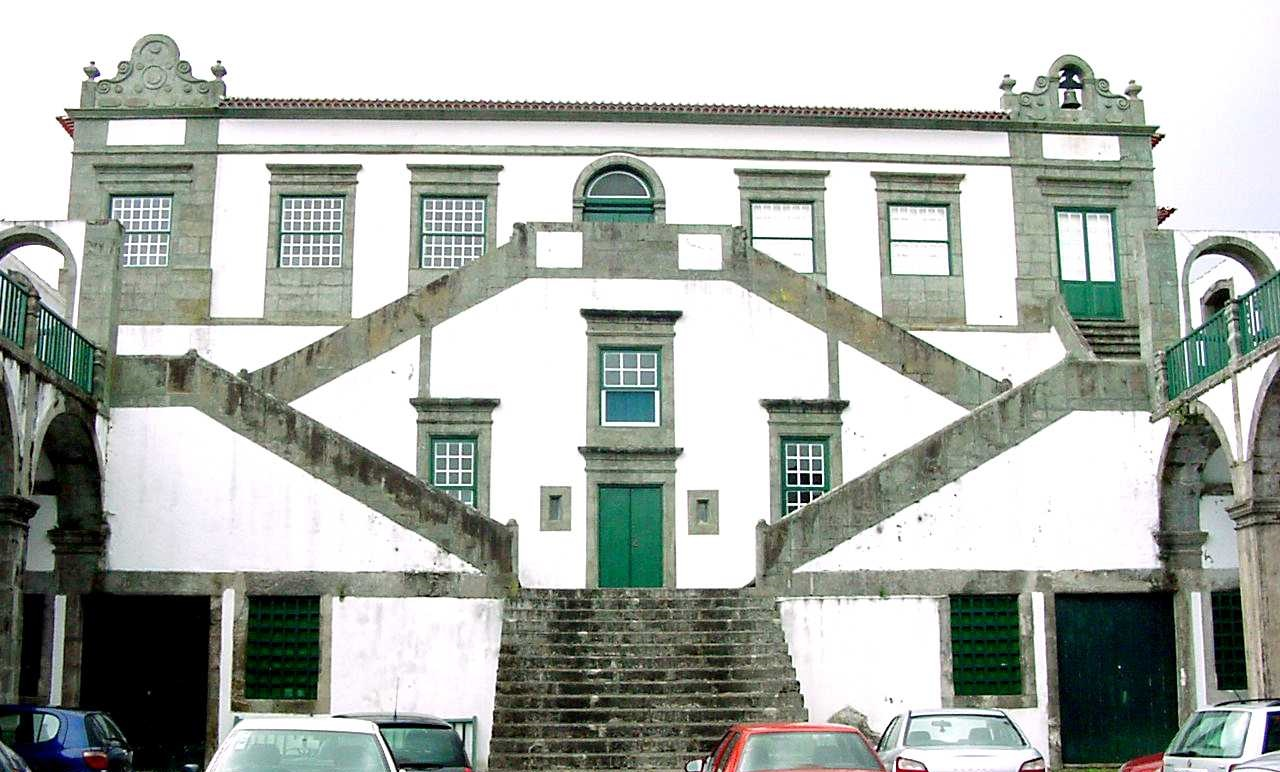
- The massive facade of the entranceway to the palace

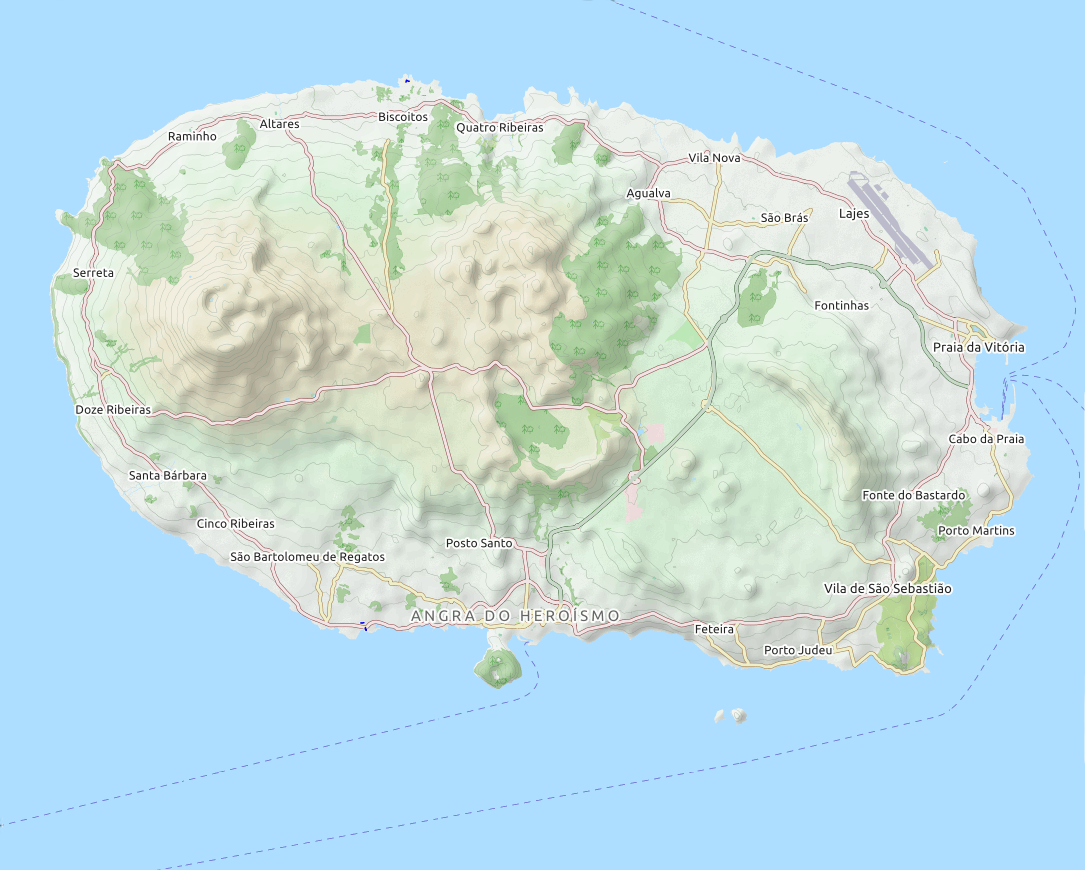
- Location of the palace within the municipality of Angra do Heroísmo, island of Terceira

General information
- Type: Manorhouse
- Architectural style: Medieval
- Location: São Pedro, Angra do Heroísmo, Portugal
- Coordinates: 38°39′37.5″N 27°13′55.5″W
- Opened: 15th-16th century
- Owner: Roman Catholic Diocese of Angra

Technical details
- Material: Basalt

Manor of Santa Catarina (Portuguese: Solar de Santa Catarina/Paço Episcopal de Angra do Heroísmo) is a former-manorhouse in the civil parish of São Pedro, in the municipality of Angra do Heroísmo, on the Portuguese island of Terceira, in the Azores. For many years it served as the family seat of the descendants of the Corte-Real, before becoming the official residence of the Bishop of Angra do Heroísmo.

== History ==
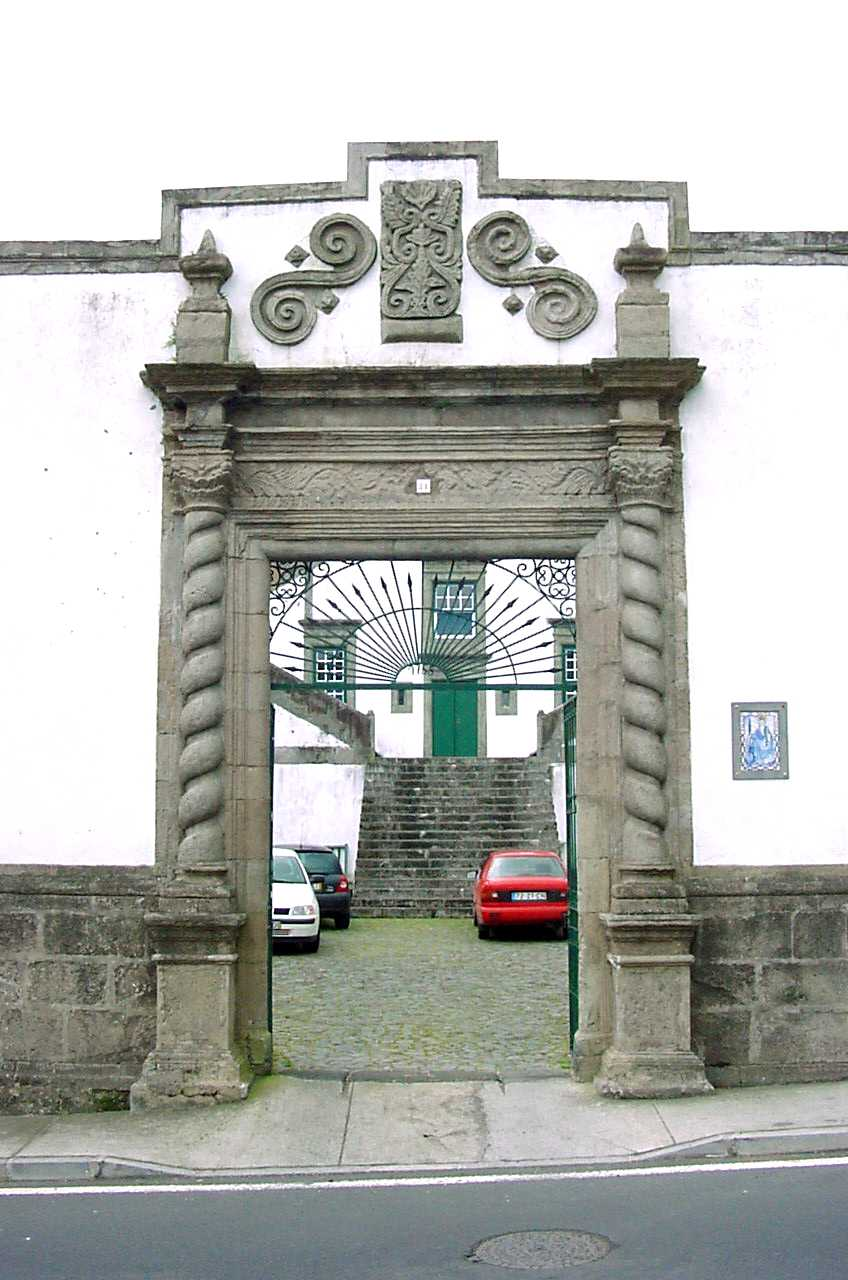
Gates to the entrance of the episcopal palace

The manor served as the primary residence for the Corte-Real family for centuries.

This palace was subject to restoration and maintenance works after the earthquake that occurred on 1 January 1980 quite the damaged.

Currently the palace serves as one of the official residences of the Bishop of Angra do Heroísmo and is property of the diocese, hosting Pope John Paul II during his visit to the Azores.

On 9 September 2004, the spaces were classified under a resolution-in-council of the Azorean government (126/2004), encompassing the former-classification of the property within the city of Angra do Heroísmo (JORAA, Série 1, 15).

== Architecture ==
The manor, of appreciable dimensions, is located in the locality of Pico da Urze, near Portões de São Pedro, just north of the Angra campus of the University of the Azores.

It is recognizable for its massive entrance gate and walled compound, that includes internal arcade constructed of regional stone.
