= Sicilian octave =

The Sicilian octave (Italian: ottava siciliana) is a verse form consisting of eight lines of eleven syllables each, called a hendecasyllable. The form is common in late medieval Italian poetry. In English poetry, iambic pentameter is often used instead of syllabics. The form has a prescribed rhyme scheme ($\mathrm{ABABABAB}$). Although only the final two rhymes are different from the much more common ottava rima, the two eight-line forms evolved completely separately. According to the Princeton Encyclopedia of Poetry and Poetics, scholars disagree on the origin of the Sicilian octave, but all agree that it is related to the development of the first eight lines of the sonnet (called the octave). It is not clear whether the octave emerged first and influenced the sonnet or vice versa.

The form is a variant of the strambotto, which is one of the earliest verse forms in the Italian language. The strambotto was used in Sicily and Tuscany, and consisted of either six or eight hendecasyllables. The rhyme scheme varied, but the Tuscan form generally did not use the Sicilian octave scheme; the most common was $\mathrm{ABABCCDD}$.

The Sicilian octave is rare in Italian after the Renaissance and has seldom been used in English except as an illustration of the form. Before the 15th century, however, it was used often by poets in southern Italy, and was an important influence for Petrarch in his sonnets. Boccaccio, who popularized and may have invented the unrelated ottava rima, used the Sicilian octave a total of once, in his early romance Filocolo. The epitaph of Giulia Topazia is a Sicilian octave:

Qui, d'Atropos il colpo ricevuto,
giace di Roma Giulia Topazia,
dell'alto sangue di Cesare arguto
discesa, bella e piena d'ogni grazia,
che, in parto, abbandonati in non dovuto
modo ci ha: onde non fia giá mai sazia
l'anima nostra il suo non conosciuto
Dio biasimar che fè sí gran fallazia.

Here, having received Atropos's blow,
lies Giulia Topazia of Rome
descended from the high bloodline of witty Caesar,
beautiful, and full of every grace,
who, in childbirth, abandoned us in a manner that ought not be:
thus, our minds will never have enough
of cursing her God, unknowable,
who might make such a great error.
