= William Barnett (Georgia politician) =

American politician

Member of the U.S. House of Representatives from Georgia's at large district
- In office October 5, 1812 – March 3, 1815
- Preceded by: Howell Cobb
- Succeeded by: Richard Henry Wilde

Personal details
- Born: March 4, 1761 Amherst County, Virginia Colony, British America
- Died: April 1832 (aged 71) Montgomery County, Alabama, U.S.
- Resting place: Gilmer-Christian-Barnett Cemetery; Montgomery County, Alabama
- Party: Democratic-Republican
- Spouse(s): Mary Meriwether
- Children: 6
- Parents: Susanna (née Crawford) (father); Nathaniel Barnett (mother)

Military service
- Allegiance: United States
- Battles/wars: American Revolutionary War; *Siege of Yorktown

William Barnett (March 4, 1761 – April 1832) was an American slave owner, politician and soldier.

== Early life ==
William Barnett was born in Amherst County in the Virginia Colony on March 4, 1761, to Nathaniel and Susanna (née Crawford). Early in his life, they moved to Columbia County, Georgia. He had a brother Joel.

== American Revolutionary War ==
At the start of the American Revolution, Barnett and his brother returned to Virginia to fight under Marquis de Lafayette and were participants in the surrender of Cornwallis at the Siege of Yorktown.

== Political career ==
Married 1785 to Mary Meriwether.

Barnett returned to Elbert County, Georgia, after the war and settled on the Broad River. He was the county sheriff from some time and was elected to the Georgia Senate and presided as that body's president. Upon the resignation of Howell Cobb in 1812 to accept a captain's commission in the United States Army to fight in the War of 1812, Barnett was elected as Democratic-Republican to the 13th United States Congress and served from October 5, 1812, until March 3, 1815.

After his congressional service, Barnett was appointed in 1815 as a commissioner to establish the boundaries of the Creek Indian reservation.

== Later life and death ==
He moved to Montgomery County, Alabama and died there in April 1832. He was buried in the Gilmer-Christian-Barnett Cemetery, near Mathews Station in that county.

== Notes ==
U.S. House of Representatives
| Preceded by Howell Cobb | Member of the U.S. House of Representatives from Georgia's at-large congressional district October 5, 1812 – March 3, 1815 | Succeeded by Richard H. Wilde |
