= Corte-Real family =

Portuguese noble family

Corte-Real Côrte-Real, Corte Real
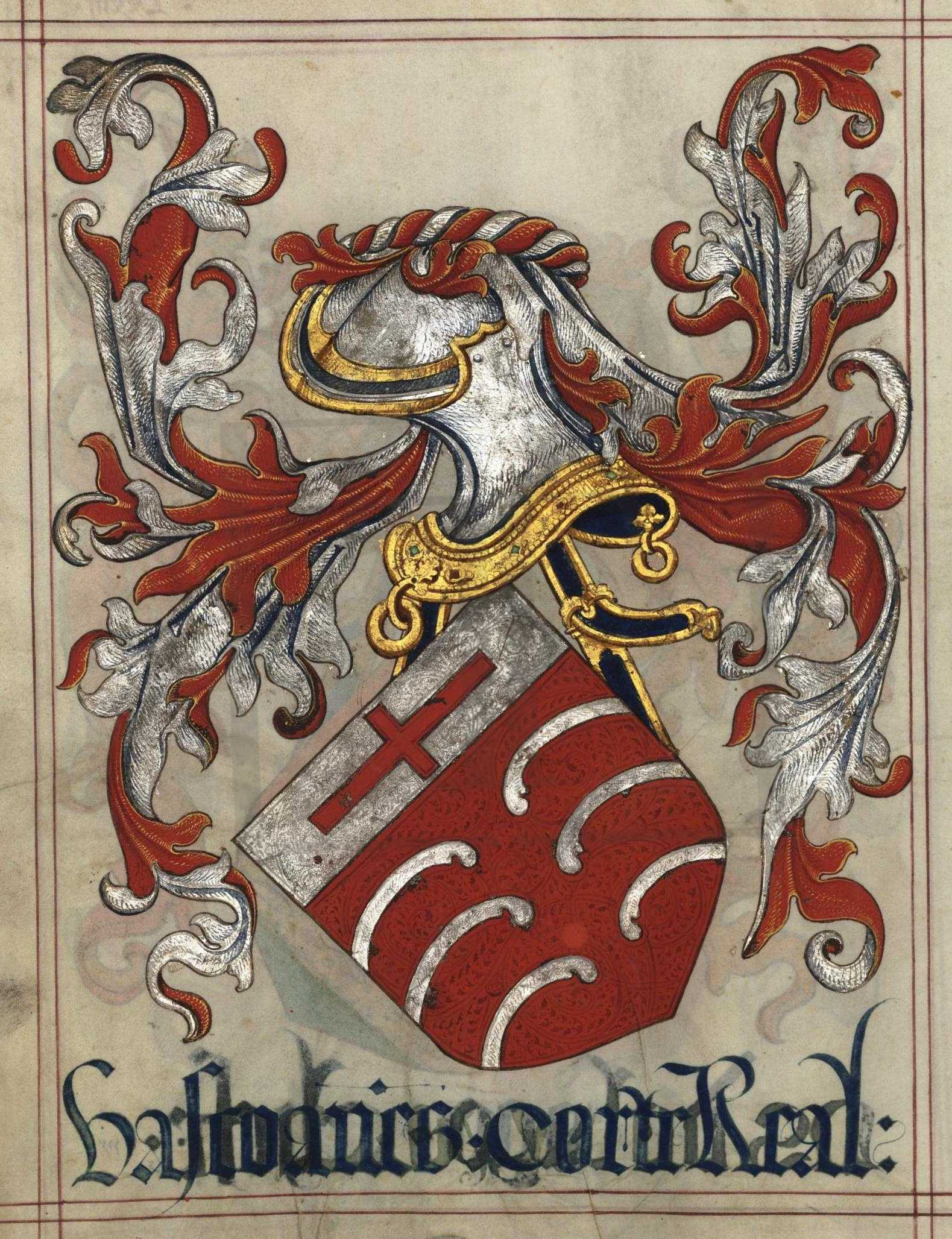
- Parent house: Costa
- Country: Portugal
- Origin: Tavira, Algarve, Portugal; Azores, Portugal
- Founded: 15th century
- Founder: Vasco Anes da Costa Corte-Real
- Titles: Marquis of Castelo Rodrigo; Marquis of Vagos; Count of Aveiras; Count of Subserra; Count of Lumiares; Count of Fijó; Viscount of Bucelas; Viscount of Fijó; Baron of Ponte da Quarteira; Majorat of Eça; Majorat of Vale de Palma; Majorat of Silves; Lord of Mira
- Estate: Santa Catarina Palace
- Cadet branches: Gil Vaz da Costa Corte-Real

The Corte-Real family (also Côrte-Real and Corte Real) is a Portuguese noble family dating back to 14th century, originating in Tavira. The family is famous for its involvement in the Portuguese discoveries during the Age of Exploration, in the 16th century. During this time, João Vaz Corte-Real and his sons Gaspar Corte-Real and Miguel Corte-Real notably participated in exploratory voyages to Newfoundland, in Canada.

For their discoveries in service of the Portuguese Crown, the family was given the islands of Terceira and São Jorge, in the Azores, and charged with their development and colonization. The family integrated itself well into the Portuguese nobility in the 17th century through a series of successful marriages and acquisition of several titles, notably Marquis of Castelo Rodrigo.

== Family history ==
The origins of the Corte-Real family lie in the 14th century, when Vasco Anes da Costa, a Portuguese knight from Tavira, was one of the supporters of the pretensions of John Master of Aviz to the Portuguese throne and after him, his homonym son, who participated on the conquest of Ceuta, being one the first warriors to cross the wall of the moor city. Besides being selected as Alcaide of Tavira and Silves, he also served as Algarve's fronteiro-mor (a kind of governor of the Region). Later, king John I's heir, Edward I of Portugal granted him the use of the surname Corte-Real (Portuguese for Royal Court) for his descendants. From him and his brother, Gil Vaz da Costa, the first members of the Corte-Real family descend.

João Vaz Corte-Real (c. 1420-1496) was Vasco Anes da Costa Corte-Real oldest son. He, alongside two of his four sons (Miguel and Gaspar), participated in various exploratory voyages sponsored jointly by the Portuguese and Danish Crowns. These voyages are said to have been some of the first to reach Newfoundland and possibly other parts of northeastern Canada. For the family's service to the crown, João Vaz was made Captain-Donatário (proprietor and governor) of the islands of Terceira and São Jorge, in the Azores.

Gaspar and Miguel's young brother, Vasco Anes II Corte-Real, was nominated also, like his homonym grandfather, alcaide-mor of Tavira, in the early 16th century, accumulating the title with the one inherited from his father as capitain-donatário.

This Vasco Anes II Corte-Real had four sons, one of them, Manuel Corte-Real, was heir to the position of capitain-donatário of Angra, and another one, Bernardo Corte-Real, succeeded him in the position of Alcaide de Tavira.

Another one of the other Vasco Anes II's sons, Jerónimo Corte-Real (1530-1588) served in various places in Asia and Africa across the Portuguese Empire before retiring back to Portugal as a court painter and poet to King Sebastian I of Portugal. His works were contemporary of Luís Vaz de Camões and said even to rival them, gaining Jerónimo the epithet of the Portuguese Virgil.

Through Manuel Corte-Real descents, this Corte-Real branch continued administration of the family's Azorean islands, while integrating into the administration of the Algarve. By 1581, the family was headed by Margarida Corte-Real. As the heiress to the Corte-Real family's wealth and titles in both the Azores and the Algarve, Margarida was an especially attractive bride for members of the Portuguese nobility. She married Cristóvão de Moura e Távora, 1st Marquis of Castelo Rodrigo and several times a Viceroy of Portugal, during the Philippine Dynasty. As Margarida was richer and had more extensive notability and power, the children of her marriage would carry her name more prominently than her husbands.

Margarida's son, Manuel de Moura Corte Real, 2nd Marquis of Castelo Rodrigo, amplified the family's position under the Habsburg monarchs of Portugal. Both he and his son, Francisco de Moura Corte Real, 3rd Marquis of Castelo Rodrigo, served as Governors of the Habsburg Netherlands and became loyal subjects to the House of Habsburg. Francisco, who also served as Viceroy of Sardinia, however was the last of the Moura Corte-Real branch of the family before it was exiled from the country due to the Portuguese Restoration War, which saw the Habsburgs deposed in Portugal in lieu of House of Braganza, which expelled supporters of the previous dynasty.

== Notable members ==
- João Vaz Corte-Real (died 1496), Portuguese explorer
- Miguel Corte-Real (c. 1448–1502), Portuguese explorer
- Gaspar Corte-Real (c. 1450–1501), Portuguese explorer and brother of Miguel
- Jerónimo Corte-Real (1533–1588), Portuguese epic poet
- Manuel de Moura Corte Real, 2nd Marquis of Castelo Rodrigo (1590–1651), Governor of the Habsburg Netherlands
- Francisco de Moura Corte Real, 3rd Marquis of Castelo Rodrigo (1610-1675), Viceroy of Sardinia, Governor of the Habsburg Netherlands
- Diogo de Mendonça Corte-Real (1658-1736), Prime-Minister during the reigns of King Pedro II and King João V
- Manuel Inácio Martins Pamplona Corte Real, 1st Count of Subserra (1760-1832), general and Minister of the Kingdom during the reign of King João VI
- José de Almeida Corte Real (1805-1840), Brazilian revolutionary
- José Luciano de Castro Pereira Corte Real (1834-1914), Prime-Minister during the reigns of King Luís I and King Carlos I

== Gallery ==
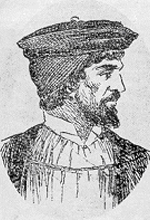
Engraving of João Vaz Corte-Real

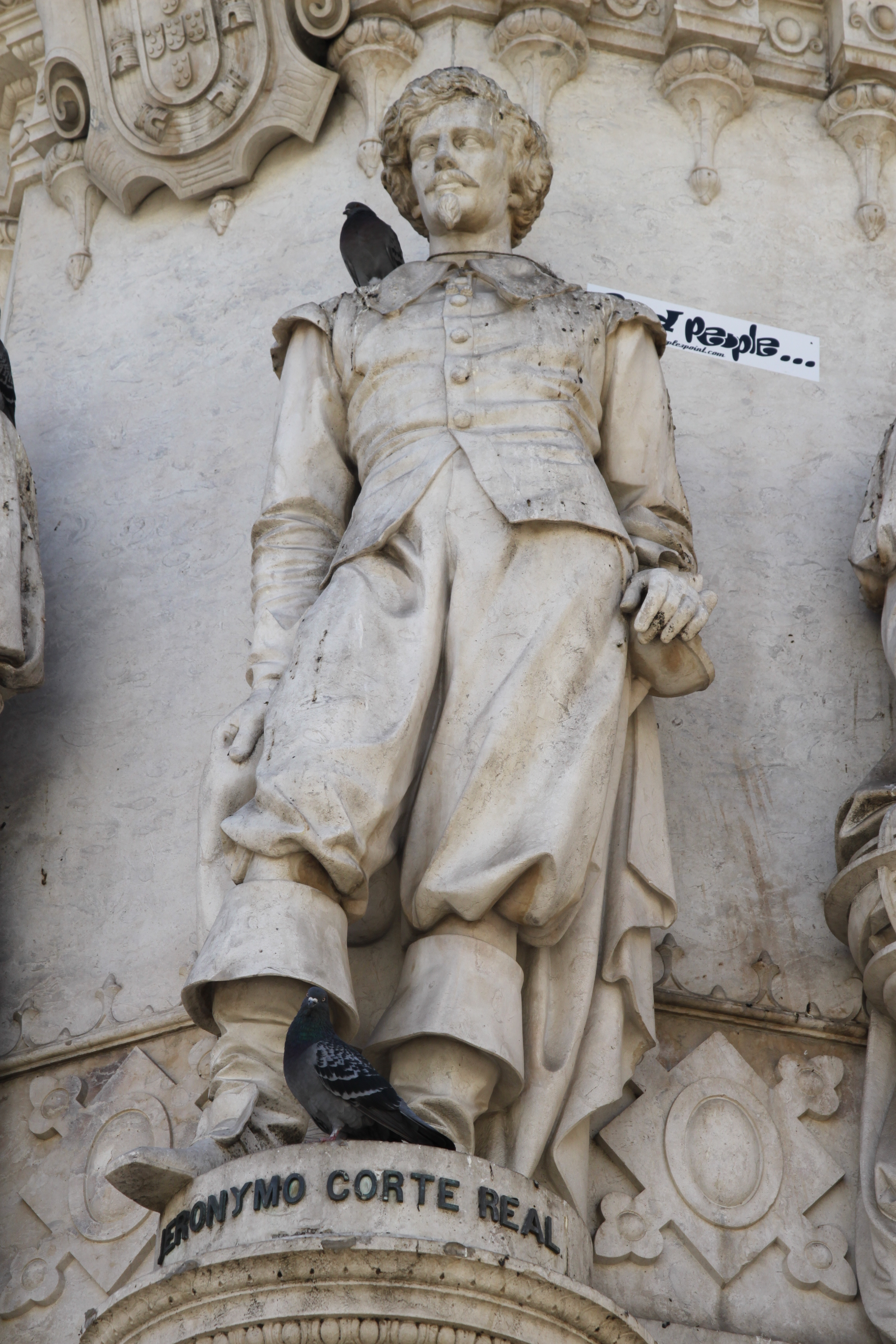
Statue in Lisbon of Jerónimo Corte-Real

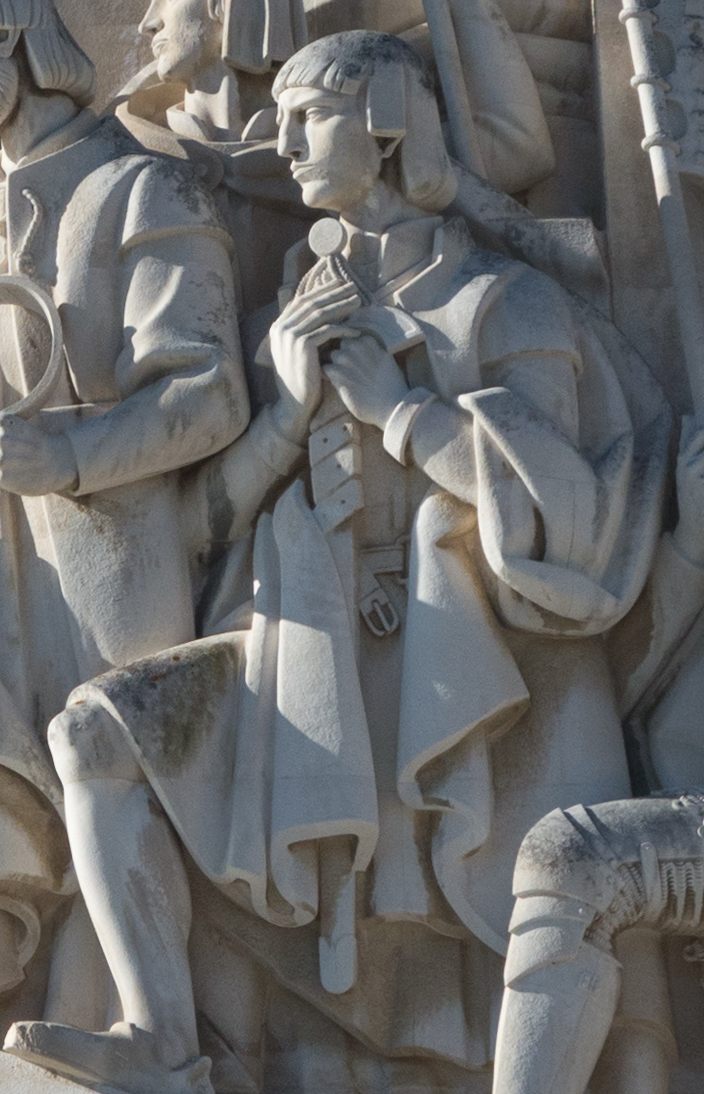
Statue in Lisbon of Gaspar Corte-Real

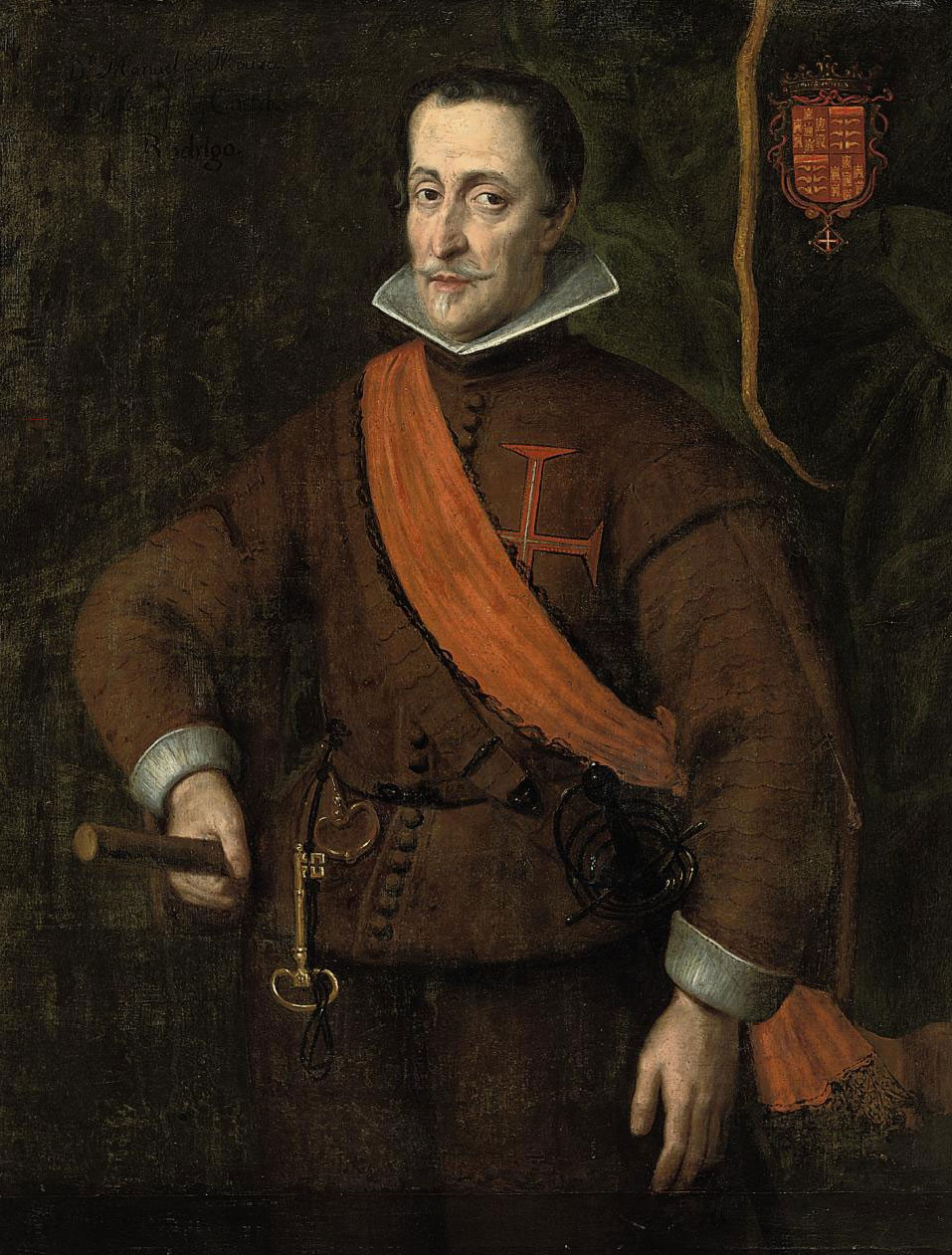
Painting of Manuel de Moura Corte Real, 2nd Marquis of Castelo Rodrigo

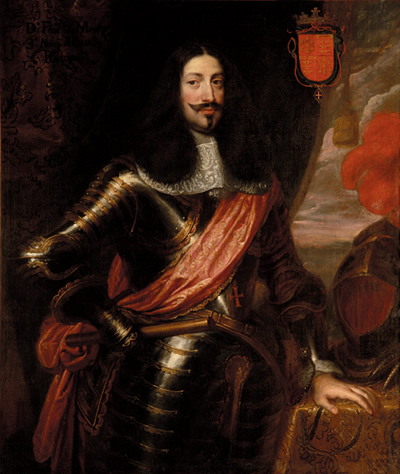
Painting of Francisco de Moura Corte Real, 3rd Marquis of Castelo Rodrigo

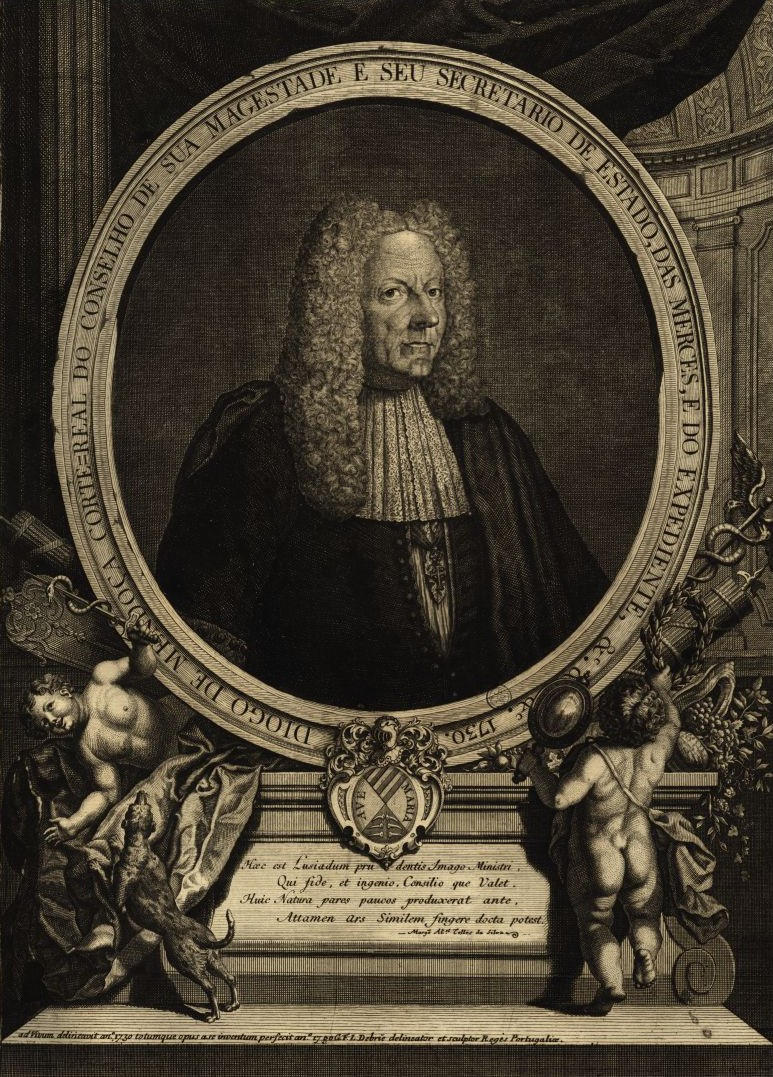
Engraving of Diogo de Mendonça Corte-Real

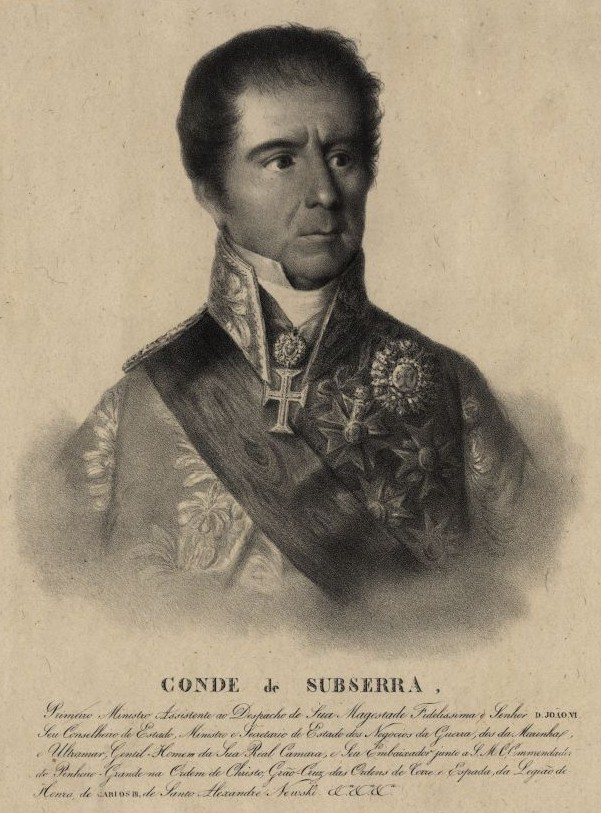
Engraving of Manuel Inácio Martins Pamplona Corte Real, 1st Count of Subserra

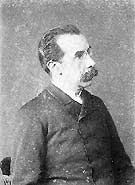
Photograph of José Luciano de Castro Pereira Corte Real
