= Gaspar Corte-Real =

Portuguese explorer (1450–c.1501)

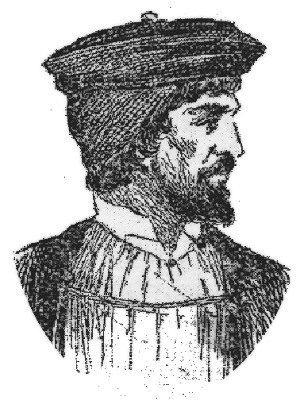
- Born: 1450; Angra do Heroismo, Terceira, Azores Islands, Kingdom of Portugal
- Disappeared: 1501; Unknown
- Died: Unknown
- Citizenship: Kingdom of Portugal
- Occupations: Navigator, explorer
- Known for: Exploring the North American coast
- Father: João Vaz Corte-Real

Gaspar Corte-Real (1450– disappeared 1501) was a Portuguese explorer who, alongside his father João Vaz Corte-Real and brother Miguel, participated in various exploratory voyages sponsored by the Portuguese Crown. These voyages are said to have been some of the first to reach Newfoundland and possibly other parts of eastern Canada.

== Early life ==
Gaspar was born into the noble Corte-Real family on Terceira in the Azores Islands, the youngest of three sons of Portuguese explorer João Vaz Corte-Real (c. 1420–1496). Gaspar accompanied his father on expeditions to North America. His brothers were explorers as well.

== Careers ==
In 1498, King Manuel I of Portugal took an interest in western exploration, likely believing that the lands recently discovered by John Cabot (the coast of North America) were within the realm of Portuguese control under the Treaty of Tordesillas. Corte-Real was one of several explorers to sail west on behalf of Portugal.

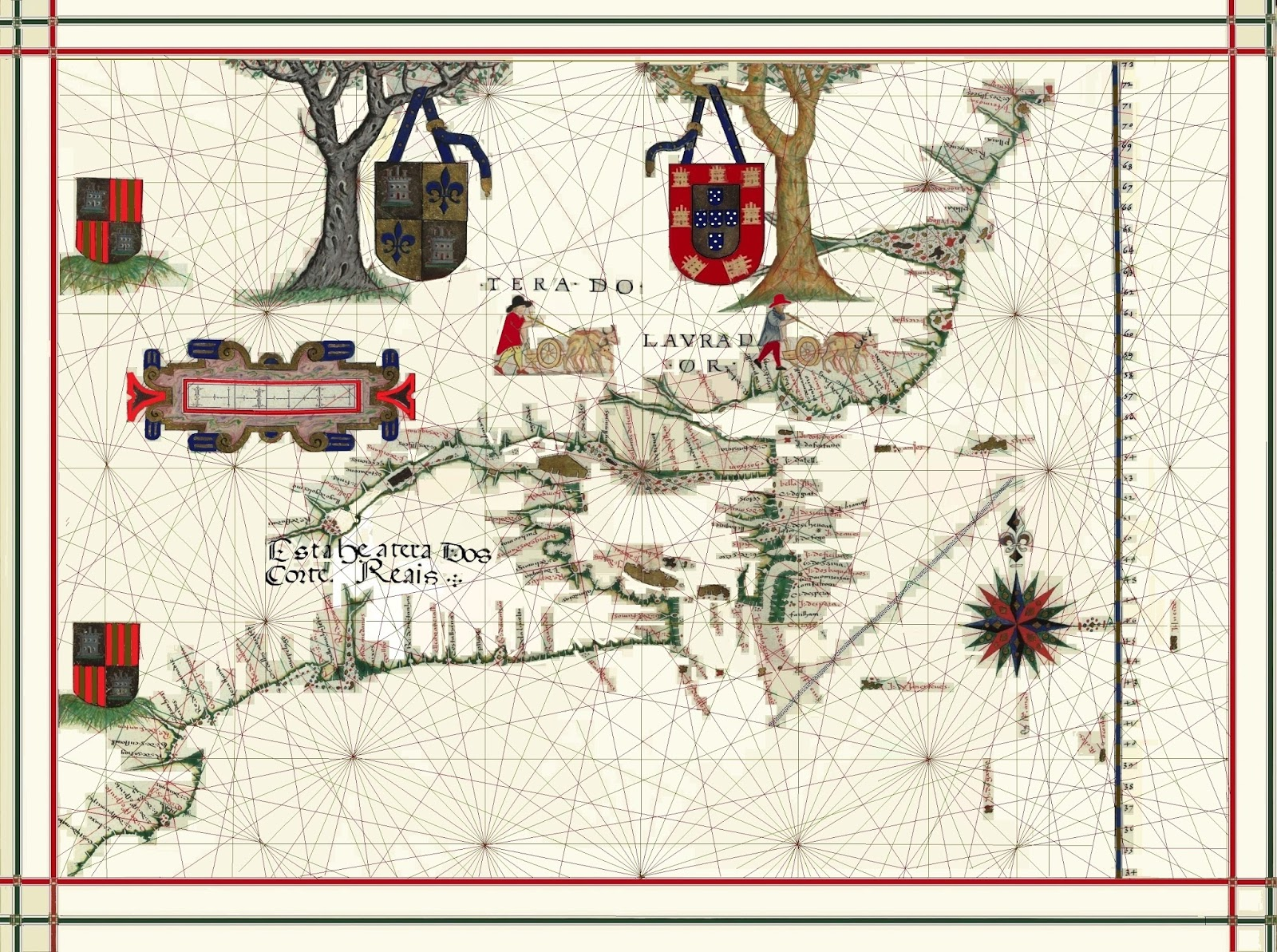
Universal Atlas by Fernão Vaz Dourado (1571), with the inscription in Portuguese: "This is the land of the Corte Real".

In 1500, Corte-Real reached Greenland, believing it to be east Asia (as Christopher Columbus had regarded the New World), but was unable to land. He set out on a second voyage in 1501, taking three caravels. The expedition was again prevented from landing at Greenland due to frozen seas. They changed course, and landed in a country of large rivers, pine trees, and berries, believed to be Labrador. There it is believed they captured 57 Indigenous people, who were taken back to Portugal to be sold into slavery to assist in financing the voyage. Two of the expedition's three ships made the return trip to Portugal, but the ship carrying Corte-Real was lost.

Nothing more was heard of Gaspar Corte-Real after 1501. His brother Miguel attempted to find him in 1502, but he too was lost.

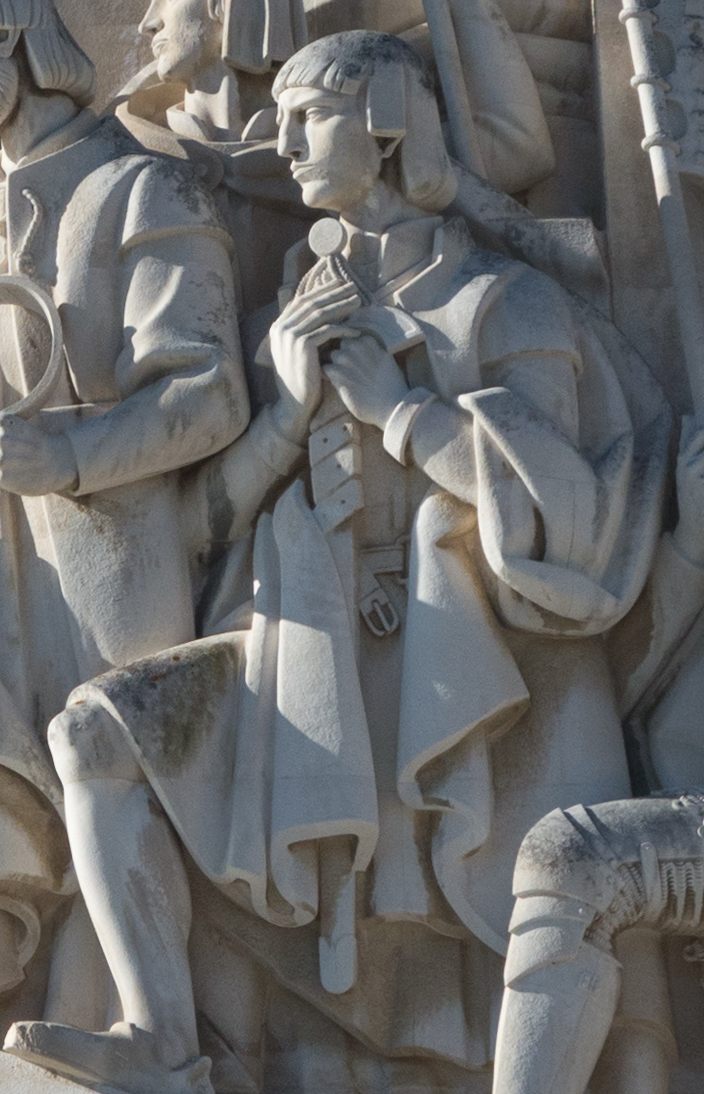
Statue of Gaspar Corte-Real in the Monument of the Discoveries, in Lisbon, Portugal.

== Legacy ==
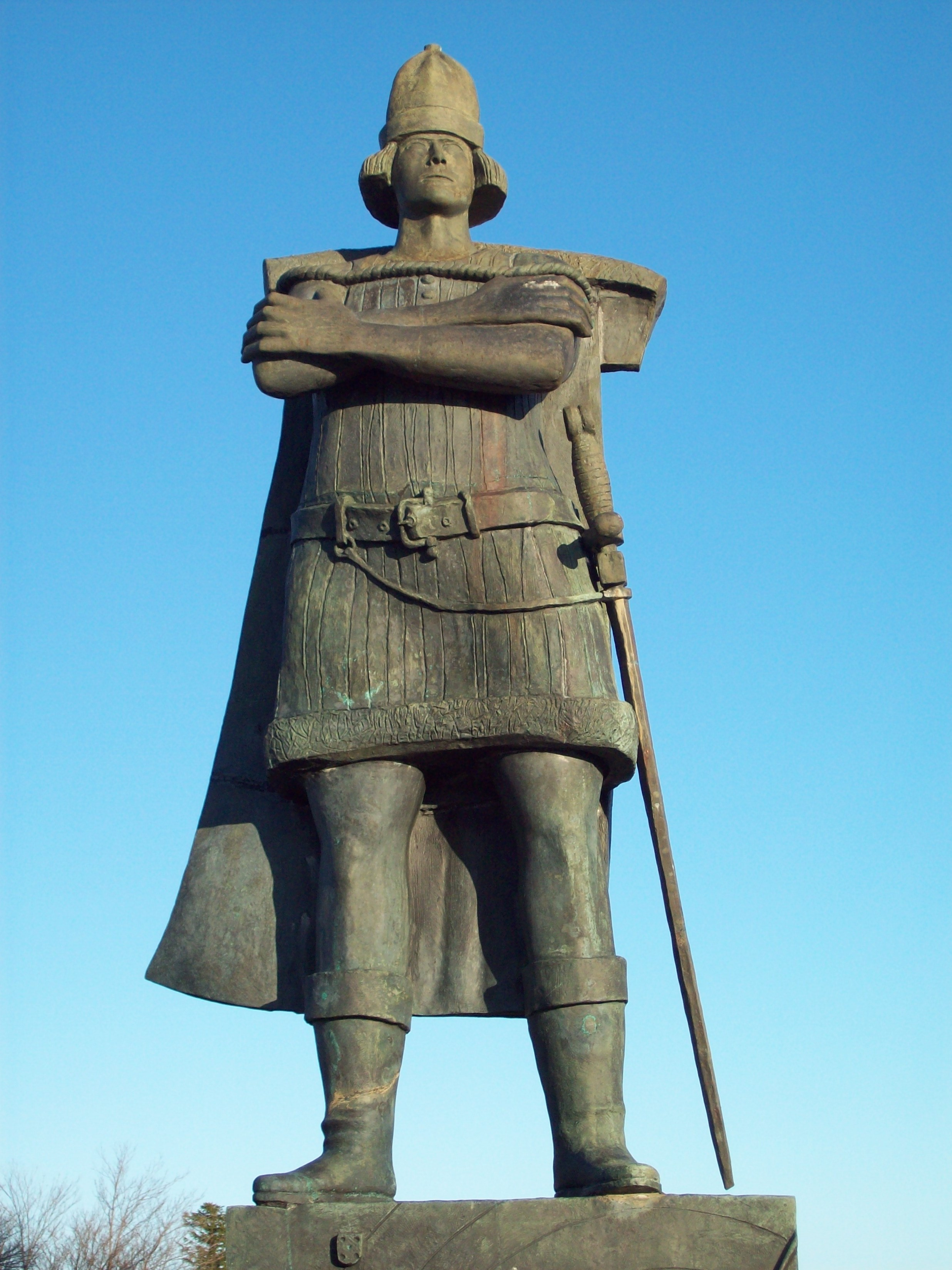
A statue of Gaspar Corte-Real, located in the city of St. John's, Newfoundland

There is debate amongst historians about the relative importance of Corte-Real. Memorial University of Newfoundland historian Jeff Webb stated in 2017 that "He is a minor figure about whom very, very little is known with confidence." The 20th-century myth-building of Corte-Real was largely the work of historian-diplomat Eduardo Brazão, the former National Secretary of Portugal's propaganda ministry, the Secretariado Nacional de Informação, Cultura Popular e Turismo, during the regime of António de Oliveira Salazar.

A statue of Corte-Real was erected in front of the Confederation Building in St. John's, Newfoundland and Labrador in 1965, and has more recently been the subject of controversy. A street in Mount Pearl is named for the explorer. A building at Memorial University of Newfoundland's St. John's campus was formerly named after him. In December 2019, the Board of Regents voted to change its name to the Global Learning Centre, after prompting by the Internationalization Office that the building presently houses.

=== St. John's statue ===
In May 1963, Brazão, then the Portuguese Ambassador to Canada, visited St. John's to meet with premier Joey Smallwood. Following conversations with Brazão, Smallwood announced on 28 May 1963 that the Portuguese fishing fleet "with the hearty approval of the government of Portugal" would commission "a famous Portuguese sculptor" to create a statue that would depict both Gaspar Corte-Real and his brother Miguel. Following their meeting, Brazão invited Smallwood to Portugal, where Smallwood met with Salazar in October of that year.

Two years later, a statue of Corte-Real (minus Miguel) was presented under the banner of the Canadian Portuguese Fisheries Organisation in 1965 to commemorate the hospitality of Newfoundlanders towards Portuguese Grand Banks fishermen.

In early 1999, a car, apparently chauffeured by a speeding tourist, slammed into the pedestal that supports the statue. The statue itself was unscathed, but its base was mangled. Later that year, Ottawa bronze restoration specialist Craig Johnson subcontracted local foundry sculptors to undertake the repairs while Johnson himself repainted the statue. According to local sculptor Will Gill, who did some of the work, no scars remain from the accident and the statue was returned to its original condition.

In 2020, it was noted that the statue, designed by Estado Novo propagandist Joaquim Martins Correia, was erected as part of a behind-the-scenes fisheries rights conflict between Salazar and Spain's Francisco Franco. In 1968, Smallwood had announced that "Generalissimo Franco is to present a statue to the province" which would have been erected beside the statue of Corte-Real; this second statue was never delivered.

On June 11, 2020, Newfoundland and Labrador Premier Dwight Ball was quoted as saying the government would review politically sensitive provincial statues. Author Edward Riche noted on June 20, 2020, "If enough people now see the statue of Corte-Real as memorializing a character who enslaved Indigenous people during his imperial ventures, we have a problem."

On June 28, 2020, it was reported that Todd Russell, president of NunatuKavut, which represents Inuit in central and southern Labrador, "doesn't need any more consultation — he wants it taken down." On July 8, 2020, it was reported that the statue had been spray-painted with the phrases "Slaver" and "Why is this guy still here?" Various opinion pieces and letters to the editor called for the statue's removal. The statue was further vandalized in July 2021, following the discovery of unmarked graves of Indigenous children on properties part of the Canadian Indian residential school system. A government working group made recommendations on the statue in February 2022; no action had been taken by July 2023. As of 2026, the statue is still in place.

== See also ==
- List of people who disappeared mysteriously at sea
