= Miguel Corte-Real =

Portuguese explorer (c.1448–c.1502)

- Born: c. 1448; Kingdom of Portugal
- Disappeared: 1502 (aged 53–54); Presumed lost at sea
- Occupations: Navigator and explorer
- Known for: Exploring the North American coast.

Miguel Corte-Real (Portuguese pronunciation: [miˈɣɛl ˈkoɾtɨ ʁiˈal]; c. 1448 – 1502?) was a Portuguese explorer who charted about 600 miles of the coast of Labrador. In 1502, he disappeared while on an expedition and was believed to be lost at sea.

== Early life ==
Miguel Corte-Real was a son of João Vaz Corte-Real and a brother of explorer Gaspar Corte-Real, members of the Corte-Real family.

== Exploration ==
In 1500, Miguel's brother Gaspar reached Greenland, believing it to be Asia, but was unable to land. The following year, Gaspar sailed west again, this time making landfall at what is believed to have been Newfoundland. Only two of the three ships of the 1501 expedition returned to Portugal; the third ship, carrying Gaspar, was lost. Miguel invested significant sums of money into these two expeditions, and in return, Gaspar promised him a share of any new lands he claimed. He has gone on multiple voyages.

In May 1502, Miguel set out from Lisbon with three ships on an expedition to search for his brother. The expedition apparently reached the location where Gaspar's party had landed, at which point the three ships broke off in different directions to search. Later, the ship carrying Miguel failed to appear at a designated rendezvous on August 20. The other two ships made the return voyage to Portugal, while Miguel and his ship were never seen again.

In 1503, the last surviving brother, Vasco Añes Corte-Real, planned another rescue expedition for his two brothers. King Manuel I furnished two ships, but would not permit Vasco himself to sail with them. The expedition returned in the fall without having found any trace of either brother.

== Dighton Rock myth ==
In 1912 and 1928 Edmund B. Delabarre wrote that markings on the Dighton Rock in Massachusetts suggest that Miguel Corte-Real reached New England. Delabarre stated that the markings were abbreviated Latin, and the message, translated into English, read as follows: I, Miguel Cortereal, 1511. In this place, by the will of God, I became a chief of the Indians. Samuel Eliot Morison dismissed this evidence in his 1971 book The European Discovery of America: The Northern Voyages. More recent scholarship by Douglas Hunter has definitively debunked the Corte-Real origin myth.

== See also ==
- Age of Discovery
- List of people who disappeared mysteriously at sea
- Northwest Passage
