= Joseph M. White =

American politician

Joseph M. White (May 10, 1781 – October 19, 1839) was a delegate to the U.S. House of Representatives from the Florida Territory.

Born in Franklin County, Kentucky; completed preparatory studies; studied law; was admitted to the bar and practiced; moved to Pensacola, Florida in 1821; one of the commissioners under the act of Congress of May 8 1822, "for ascertaining claims and titles to lands within the Territory of Florida"; elected to the Nineteenth United States Congress and to the five succeeding Congresses (March 4, 1825 – March 3, 1837); unsuccessful candidate for reelection to the Twenty-fifth United States Congress; author of a New Collection of Laws, Charters, etc., of Great Britain, France, and Spain Relating to Cessions of Lands, with the Laws of Mexico, in two volumes published in 1839.

In 1828 he established an antebellum cotton plantation with another legislator named Richard H. Wilde (1789–1847). The plantation was named Casa Bianca Plantation, and it was located southwest of Monticello in Jefferson County, Florida.

He died in St. Louis, Missouri and is buried at Bellefontaine Cemetery.

Political offices
Preceded by Richard Keith Call	Delegate to the U.S. House of Representatives from Florida Territory; 1825 – 1837	Succeeded by Charles Downing
