= Brás Garcia de Mascarenhas =

Soldier, poet and writer (1596–1656)

Brás Garcia de Mascarenhas (Avô, Oliveira do Hospital, Portugal, 3 February 1596 - Avô, Oliveira do Hospital, Portugal, 8 August 1656) was a Portuguese soldier, poet and writer, author of the poem Viriato Trágico.

During his youth, he traveled to the Portuguese colony of Brazil, and through parts of Europe (France, Italy, and Spain).

He then fought in the Portuguese Restoration War, where he organized a battalion of volunteers known as the Company of the Lions of Beira. As a reward for his services, he was awarded the governorship of the Castle of Alfaites at the Portuguese border.

After disobeying the general of the Beira province, Sancho Manoel de Vilhena, he was arrested and held at the Castle of Sabugal. He then wrote to the king John IV of Portugal the epic poem Viriato Trágico, as a way of justifying his actions and requesting forgiveness. The king, impressed with his talent and skill, returned him to freedom.

His work, posthumously edited in 1699, was re-edited in 1846.

He married Maria da Fonseca da Costa on 19 February 1645.
