= Richard H. Wilde =

American politician

Richard Henry Wilde
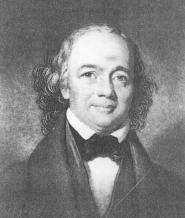

Member of the U.S. House of Representatives from Georgia
- In office November 17, 1827 – March 3, 1835
- Preceded by: John Forsyth
- Succeeded by: John W. A. Sanford
- Constituency: 2nd district (1827–1829) at-large district (1829–1835)
- In office February 7, 1825 – March 3, 1825
- Preceded by: Thomas W. Cobb
- Succeeded by: James Meriwether
- Constituency: at-large district
- In office March 4, 1815 – March 3, 1817
- Preceded by: William Barnett
- Succeeded by: Joel Abbot
- Constituency: at-large district

14th Attorney General of Georgia
- In office 1811–1813
- Preceded by: Alexander M. Allen
- Succeeded by: Alexander M. Allen

Personal details
- Born: September 24, 1789 Dublin, Ireland
- Died: September 10, 1847 (aged 57) New Orleans, Louisiana, U.S.
- Resting place: City Cemetery, Augusta, Georgia, United States
- Party: Democratic-Republican

Richard Henry Wilde (September 24, 1789 – September 10, 1847) was a United States representative and lawyer from Georgia.

== Biography ==
Wilde was born in Dublin, Ireland, in 1789 to Richard Wilde and Mary Newitt, but came to America at age eight and moved to Augusta, Georgia, in 1802. His brother was Judge John W. Wilde, a judge of Augusta, Georgia. He was a businessman and studied law. After gaining admittance to the state bar in 1809, Wilde practiced law in Augusta. He served as the solicitor general of the superior court of Richmond County, Georgia, and was also the attorney general of Georgia from 1811 to 1813 as a result of holding the Richmond County position.

In 1814, Wilde was elected as a Democratic-Republican Representative to the 14th United States Congress and served one term from March 4, 1815, until March 3, 1817, as he lost his reelection campaign in 1816. Upon Thomas W. Cobb's resignation, Wilde successfully ran as a Crawford Republican to fill that seat in the 18th Congress and served only a month from February 7, 1825, to March 3, 1825. After several more unsuccessful Congressional campaigns in 1824 and 1826, Wilde ran again in 1827 as a Jacksonian to fill the vacancy caused by the resignation of John Forsyth and won election to fill that term. He was reelected to three additional terms (21st, 22nd and 23rd Congresses) in that seat and served from November 17, 1827, to March 3, 1835.

In 1828 he established the Casa Bianca Plantation, an antebellum cotton plantation southwest of Monticello in Jefferson County, Florida, in a partnership with was created by Joseph Mills White (1781–1839).

Wilde lost his reelection campaign in 1834 and traveled in Europe from 1835 to 1840. In Italy he associated with Edward Everett, Horatio Greenough, Hiram Powers and Charles Sumner.

In 1843, Wilde moved to New Orleans, returned to the practice of law and served as a professor of constitutional law at the University of Louisiana at New Orleans (current-day Tulane University). Wilde died in New Orleans on September 10, 1847, and was interred in a vault in a cemetery in New Orleans. In 1854, he was reinterred at Sand Hill family burying ground near Augusta and then reinterred an additional time in 1886 in Augusta's City Cemetery.

In 1896, a marble memorial to Wilde was erected, by the Hayne Lyterary Circle of Augusta, on Greene Street.

== Writings ==
Wilde wrote a well known poem Hesperia about the geography and topography of the United States. His magnum opus was an unfinished poem called "My life is like the Summer Rose" that he wrote to remember his brother, James Wilde, who was killed in a duel. He wrote several other works, prompting Rufus Wilmot Griswold to consider including him in one of his influential anthologies. Though he did provide several pieces for Griswold to include, Wilde responded, "As literature does no good for an advocate's reputation, I should be pleased if you will give my place... to somebody else." The only complete book-length work published in his lifetime was Conjectures and Researches concerning the Love, Madness, and Imprisonment of Torquato Tasso (1842). Two works left incomplete were Life and Times of Dante and Specimens of the Italian Lyric Poets.

U.S. House of Representatives
Preceded by William Barnett	Member of the U.S. House of Representatives from Georgia's at-large congressional district March 4, 1815 – March 3, 1817	Succeeded by Joel Abbot
Preceded by Thomas Willis Cobb	Member of the U.S. House of Representatives from Georgia's at-large congressional district February 7, 1825 – March 3, 1825	Succeeded by James Meriwether
Preceded by John Forsyth	Member of the U.S. House of Representatives from Georgia's 2nd congressional district November 17, 1827 – March 3, 1829	Succeeded by Redistricted to At Large Districts
Preceded by Redistricted	Member of the U.S. House of Representatives from Georgia's at-large congressional district March 4, 1829 – March 3, 1835	Succeeded by John W. A. Sanford
