= Vasco Mouzinho de Quevedo =

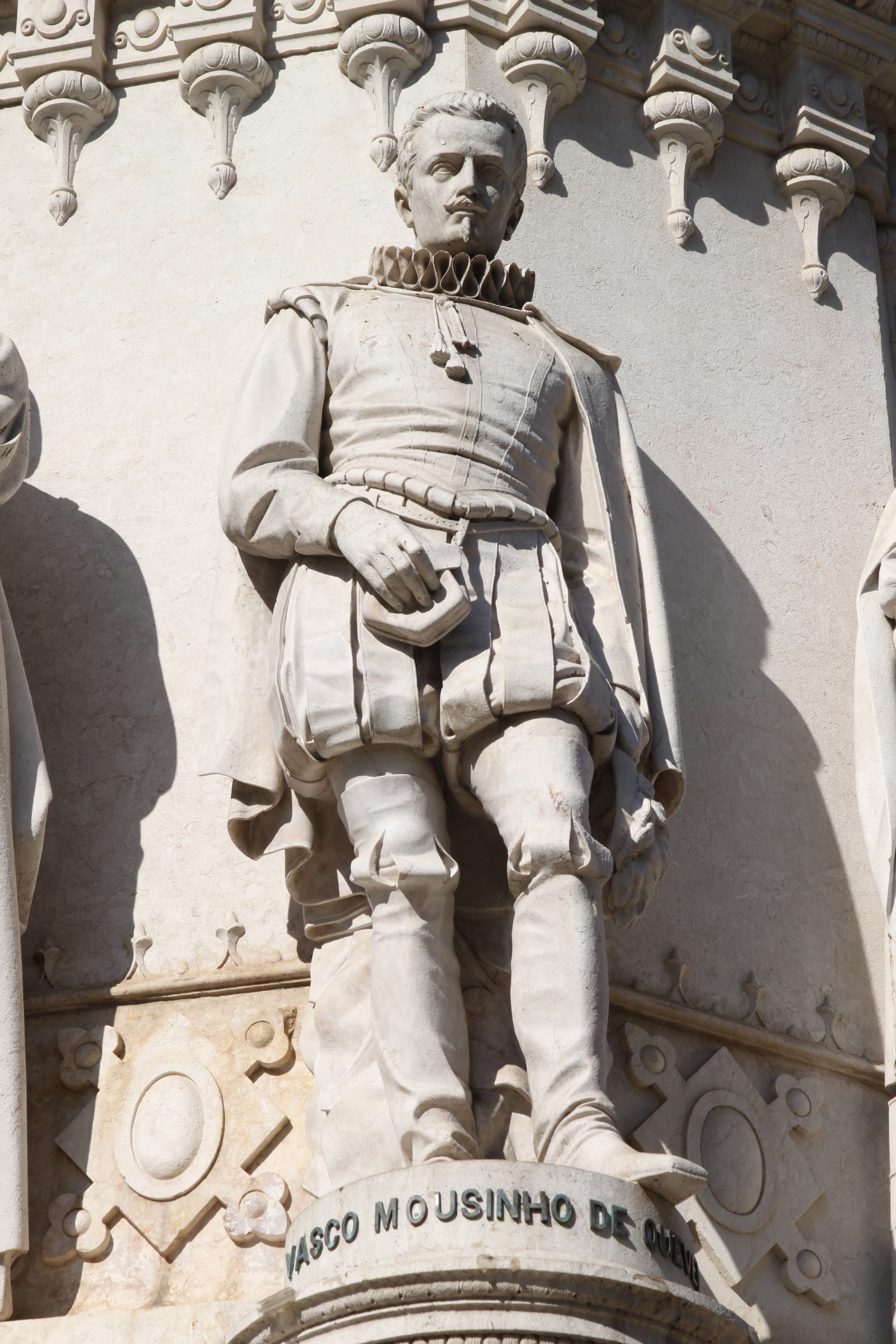
Statue of Vasco Mouzinho de Quevedo in the Camões Monument, Lisbon

Vasco Mouzinho de Quevedo (c. 1570-c. 1619) was a Portuguese poet, known for his epic poems.

== Biography ==
Although Vasco Mouzinho de Quevedo e Castelo Branco is regarded as one of greatest Portuguese poets, very little is known about his personal life. He was born around 1570 and died around 1619. He studied law at the University of Coimbra. He wrote both lyrical poetry and epic poems.

== Works ==
Vasco Mouzinho de Quevedo wrote some short poems, for example sonnets, but is known for long poems. He is regarded as an important successor of Luis de Camões. His first big work is Discurso sobre a Vida e Morte de Santa Isabel Rainha de Portugal which was published in Lisbon 1596 under the title Discurso sobre a Vida e Morte de Santa Isabel Rainha de Portugal e Outras Várias Rimas. The work that is always connected with the name of Vasco Mouzinho de Quevedo is a long epic poem Afonso Africano that was published in 1611. It narrates about Portuguese military expedition to Morocco led by king Afonso V who was later called the African for his great deeds. This war was seen and described as a modern crusade.

Both mentioned poems are written in ottava rima, a stanza of eight lines with rhyme scheme abababcc (in Portuguese oitava-rima).
