= Robert W. Williams Plantation =

Cotton plantation in Florida, United States

Coordinates: 30.622°N 84.250°W

The Robert W. Williams Plantation was a small cotton-growing forced-labor farm located in of approximately 800 acres (320 ha) located in northern Leon County, Florida, U.S. established by Robert W. Williams.

== Location ==
The Robert W. Williams Plantation was located on the southwest shore of Lake Iamonia.

== Plantation specifics ==
The Leon County Florida 1860 Agricultural Census shows that the Robert W. Williams Plantation had the following:

- Improved Land: 400 acres (160 ha)
- Unimproved Land: 400 acres (160 ha)
- Cash value of plantation: $8,000
- Cash value of farm implements/machinery: $300
- Cash value of farm animals: N/A
- Number of slaves: 37
- Bushels of corn: N/A
- Bales of cotton: N/A

== The owner ==
Robert W. Williams was an attorney and represented the Marquis de Lafayette and his heirs over the Lafayette lands. Williams also belonged to the National Agricultural Society and served as vice-president from 1841-1842 and was considered a scientific farmer
