= Dyzma Bończa-Tomaszewski =

Polish poet, writer and playwright

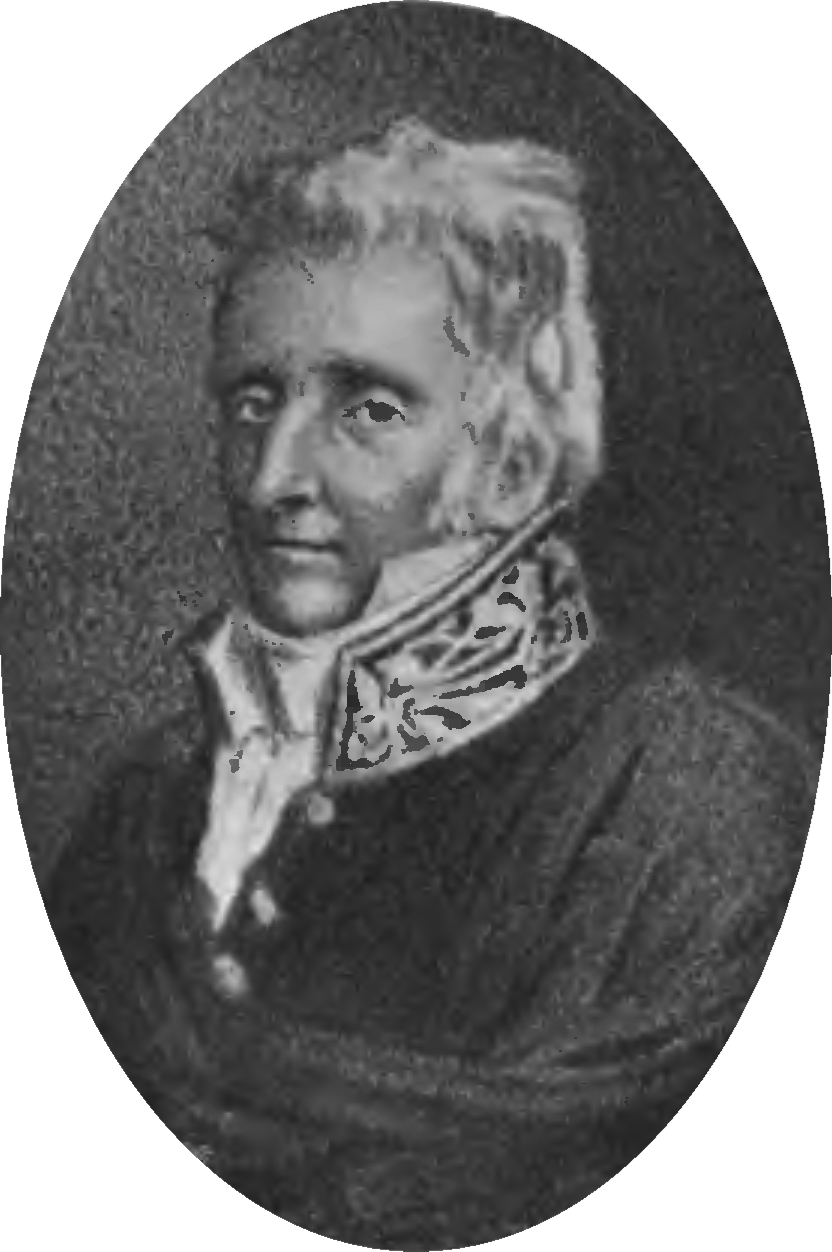
Dyzma Bończa-Tomaszewski

Dyzma Bończa-Tomaszewski (1749–1825) was a Polish poet, writer and playwright. He was educated at a Jesuit school in the town of Sandomierz. As a young man he took part in the Bar Confederation; later he was conservative both as a politician and a poet. He wrote a comedy, Małżeństwo w rozwodzie (A Couple Getting Divorced), and a poem, Rolnictwo (Agriculture). He also wrote the long poem in ottava rima, Jagiellonida (Epic of Jagiełło, 1817), which it was his ambition to make a Polish national epic. Bończa-Tomaszewski's works were criticised by young poets, among others by Adam Mickiewicz. Today he is almost totally forgotten.
