= Gabriel Pereira de Castro =

Portuguese lawyer, poet and priest (1571–1632)

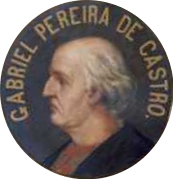
José Malhoa, Gabriel Pereira de Castro (Paços do Concelho - Lisbon)

Gabriel Pereira de Castro (7 February 1571 – 18 March 1632) was a Portuguese priest, lawyer and poet.

== Biography ==
Gabriel Pereira de Castro was born in Braga on 7 February 1571. He became a priest there. He then studied law at the University of Coimbra. Later, he was a professor there.

He died on 18 October 1632 in Lisbon.

== Works ==
=== Law ===
Pereira de Castro wrote some books about law.

=== Poetry ===
He is, however, known chiefly for his epic poem Ulisseia ou Lisboa Edificada (Ulysses or Lisbon Built). It consists of ten books and is written in ottava rima, a rhyming stanza form of Italian origin.

Its form is typical for Renaissance epic poems. The poem imitates The Lusiads by Luís Vaz de Camões. It is about the founding of the town of Lisbon by Ulysses (Odysseus).

Published posthumously in 1636 by the poet's brother, Luís Pereira de Castro, Ulisseia is considered to be one of the most significant Portuguese epic poems after Camões.

Pereira de Castro also wrote poems in Latin and Spanish.
