= Camoes =

Camoes or Camões may refer to:

- Luís de Camões, Portuguese poet
- Camões Prize, a literary prize for the Portuguese language
- Camões (film), a 1946 Portuguese drama film
- Instituto Camões, a Portuguese institution for the promotion of Portuguese language and culture
- Camões Family, Portuguese surname
- Camões Secondary School, a school in Lisbon, Portugal
- Camoes (crater), a crater on Mercury
- 5160 Camoes, an asteroid from the inner regions of the asteroid belt
