= Camões family =

Descendants of the 14th-century Portuguese nobleman Vasco Pires de Camões

The Camões family were descendants of the 14th-century Portuguese nobleman Vasco Pires de Camões.

== Origins ==
It seems that this surname had its origin from the Palace of Camauda, of which makes mention Gonzalo Argote de Molina, which is in the Kingdom of Navarre in land of the Basques, corrupted from Camanda to Camoens, from where they passed to Galicia and then to Portugal. Some say this surname came from a bird named Camão, others from the Castle of Camoens, old in the Kingdom of Galicia, next to Cape Finisterre.

The first one that can be found with this surname and from whom there is any notice was Vasco Pires de Camões (mentioned at the Chronicle of Dom João I by Fernão Lopes, C. II, C. 43). He followed the partiality of King Peter of Castile against his brother Henry II of Castile, and for that reason passed to Portugal, at the time of King Ferdinand I of Portugal, also for following in Galicia, from where he held, his side in the pretension he had for the Crown of Castile against Henry II, the Bastard. King Ferdinand gave him in the Kingdom of Portugal for his services the Alcaidarias-Móres of Alenquer and Portalegre, the Villages of Sardoal, Punhete, Mação, Amêndoa and the Council of Gestaçô, and the estate farms and lands that Infanta Beatriz or Brites, his sister, had at Estremoz and Avis, and made him one of the first Noblemen of his Council, which he later all lost. Vasco Pires de Camões followed the party of Beatrice of Portugal and Castile at the time of King John I of Portugal and against him, and was arrested at the Battle of Aljubarrota, and Aires Pires de Camões, his cousin, for what he lost the lands he had in the Kingdom of Portugal, remaining only the lands he had at Estremoz and other assets he had at Alenquer and Lisbon, from which his descendants made some Majorats, mostly at Avis and at the City of Évora, where they possessed many rent, retaining the patronymic Vaz. Gandara, in Armas y Triunfos de Galicia, Chapter 27, fl. 297 / p. 584, says that the Camões descend from Vasco Rodríguez de Caamaño, son of Fernán García de Caamaño, for Vasco Peres de Camões is thought to be the same he calls Vasco Fernández de Caamaño, second son of Fernán García de Caamaño and his wife Constanza Suárez de Figueroa, whose ancestry, with the de Caamaño surname, can be seen at the book said.

Aires Peres de Camões, following the party of King John I of Portugal, was a captain of a galley of the fleet that left from Porto against the coast of Galicia, from where the General was the Count de Trastamara.

The coat of arms they bear is in a green field a serpent neck and head in gold that leaves from between two rocks in silver, touched in red, and for Timber the same serpent of the shield, or its head. It seems to have allusion to the serpent of Cadmus or to the animal they call caiman, which is a lizard (see Orozco in Thezouro).

== Lineage ==
Vasco Peres de Camões married Maria Tenreiro. Maria was the daughter of Gonçalo Tenreiro (b. Pontevedra, Galicia), Captain-Major of the Fleets of Portugal - who supported the Crown of Castile, and bore the title Master of Christ - and his wife Maria Fernandes; and paternal granddaughter of Garcia Tenreiro (b. Pontevedra, Galicia) and his wife. Vasco Peres and Maria had three children: Gonçalo Vaz de Camões, João Vaz de Camões, and Constança Pires de Camões.

=== Gonçalo Vaz de Camões ===
Gonçalo Vaz de Camões was a rich nobleman, who lived at Avis and succeeded in name of his wife at the Majorat of the Fonsecas and married Constança da Fonseca, Lady of the Majorat of the Fonsecas (instituted by Lourenço da Fonseca on August 13, 1521), daughter of Afonso Vasques da Fonseca, Alcaide-Mór of Moreira and Marialva, and wife Mécia Lopes Pacheco (both descendants among others from Alfonso IX of León and she also from Sancho IV of Castile), and had an only son:

- António Vaz de Camões, lord of his father's house, who succeeded his maternal grandfather's Majorat of the Fonsecas, married to an unknown woman, and had:
  - Lopo Vaz de Camões, lord of his father's house in which he succeeded, married to Inês Dias da Câmara, daughter of Diogo Afonso de Aguiar, from the Island of Madeira, and first wife Isabel Gonçalves da Câmara (daughter of João Gonçalves Zarco), and had:
    - António Vaz de Camões, who succeeded in his father's house and married Dona Isabel de Castro, daughter of Dom João de Castro (bastard son of Dom João de Castro of the Lords das Alcáçovas, Captain-Major of Évora) and wife as second husband Francisca de Brito or Brandão, and had issue, three children from marriage and three bastard children by unknown women:
      - Lopo Vaz de Camões, who was called o dos Óculos (the one with the glasses), first son, who succeeded his father and at the Majorat da Camoeira, in Évora, and at the more that were together, married to Maria da Fonseca, daughter of João or Gaspar Rodrigues Preto, Estribeiro-Mór (Major Riding Master) of Empress Isabella of Portugal, as it can be seen from the inscription from his grave which is at the Chapel of Saint Francis of Évora at the part of the Epistole, and wife Mécia da Fonseca, and paternal granddaughter of Jorge Rodrigues Preto, also a Estribeiro-Mór (Major Riding Master) of Empress Isabella of Portugal, the one who instituted a Chapel at São Francisco de Évora, which is called of Nossa Senhora da Conceição (Our Lady of Concepcion), and it is said to have married Maria Bota and left some assets as a Majorat to his son António, and had:
        - António Vaz de Camões, lord of his father's house, married as her first husband Dona Francisca da Silveira (who after widowed married Gaspar de Brito Freire), daughter of Dom Álvaro da Silveira (son of the 2nd Counts de Sortelha), of some Portuguese Royal descent, and wife Brites Mexia, and had:
          - Lopo Vaz de Camões, who inherited the house and succeeded his father's Majorats, was a Lettered man, a Collegial at São Paulo, and put himself as a Friar at the Convent of Nossa Senhora da Piedade (Our Lady of Piety), from where he left for illing, and died within two months, unmarried and without issue, and inherit his Majorats his sister Maria de Meneses or Maria da Silveira
          - Frei António da Silveira de Camões or António da Silveira who, by the death of his sister Maria de Meneses or Maria da Silveira, inherited the Majorats, and was a Friar of Saint Augustine
          - Maria de Meneses or Maria da Silveira, who inherited the Majorats, by the death of her brother Lopo Vaz de Camões, and was the wife of António de Magalhães, Lord da Ponte da Barca, and then of Dom Pedro Mascarenhas de Lancastre, without issue from both marriages, passing the Majorats to her brother Frei António da Silveira de Camões or António da Silveira
          - Brites da Silveira, who died unmarried and without issue
        - Sebastião de Camões
        - Gaspar da Fonseca
        - Mécia ..., who died unmarried and without issue
        - Isabel ..., who died unmarried and without issue
        - Ana de Castro, married as his first wife to Diogo Lopes de Carvalho, Lord of the Coutos de Abadim e Negrelos, Hidalgo of the Royal Household, son of Luís Lopes de Carvalho, Hidalgo of the Royal Household, and wife Dona Mécia de Eça (male line descendant from Infante João, Duke of Valencia de Campos), and had issue still extant
      - (bastard???) Luís Gonçalves de Camões, who made and instituted the Majorat da Torre, at Avis, or of Avis, as which is called, which owned Simão de Camões, and which he left to his cousin Duarte de Camões da Câmara or de Távora (see below), unmarried, had a natural daughter who, in Testament, ordered to put as a Nun, and left 10$000 réis to his sister Antónia Pacheca, who must have been his mother's daughter:
        - (bastard) Soror Bernarda ..., a Nun at the Convent of Paraíso, in Évora
      - Francisca de Castro, married as his third wife Dom Martinho de Sousa e Távora or de Távora de Sousa or de Sousa or de Távora, Alcaide-Mór de Alter do Chão, son of Dom Manuel de Sousa or de Távora, Vedor (Reeve) of the Duke of Braganza and Alcaide-Mór de Alter do Chão, of some Portuguese Royal descent, and wife Grácia Figueira or Maria Tavares, and had issue
      - (bastard) Pedro da Fonseca de Camões, a Clergyman
      - (bastard) Antónia Pacheco, who died unmarried and without issue
      - (bastard) Isabel da Câmara, who died unmarried and without issue
    - Simão Vaz de Camões or Simão de Camões, married to an unknown woman, and had:
      - Duarte de Camões da Câmara or de Távora, who inherited the Majorat which is called of the Tower of Avis instituted by his cousin Luís Gonçalves de Camões, married to Isabel Lobo, daughter of Aires Tavares de Sousa, of some Portuguese Royal descent, and wife Maria Lobo, and had issue, five children from his marriage and a bastard son by an unknown woman:
        - Luís Gonçalves de Camões, who inherited the house and married to an unknown woman, without issue
        - Simão de Camões, who inherited the house at the death of his brother and died unmarried and without issue
        - Maria da Câmara, married as his first wife to her distant cousin Francisco de Faria Severim, Executor-Mór (Major Executioner) of the Treasury, without issue
        - Soror Constança da Câmara, a Nun at the Convent of Santa Clara, in Évora
        - Soror Ana de Sousa, a Nun at the Convent of Santa Clara, in Évora
        - (bastard) Duarte de Camões, married to Maria da Paz, and had issue:
          - Luís de Matos de Camões, married to Simoa de Faria Pimentel, and had issue:
            - Juliana Maria de Faria, married to Ascenço Lopes Franco (b. Ferreira de Aves, Sátão), son of Afonso Lopes Franco (b. Porto) and wife Águeda Martins, and had issue
    - Duarte Vaz de Camões or Duarte de Camões, third son, who never got married and made the Majorat da Camoeira, and had natural children by unknown women:
      - Pedro Gonçalves de Camões, who succeeded his father's Majorat, married firstly to Leonor de Melo, daughter of Nuno Fernandes Cogominho, Lord of the Majorat da Torre dos Coelheiros, and second wife Helena de Melo, and secondly to Isabel da Silva or de Melo, daughter of Jorge de Melo, from Alandroal, and wife Violante da Silva, both of some Portuguese Royal descent, and had issue, one daughter from each marriage:
        - Soror Francisca ..., a Nun at the Convent of São Bento
        - Soror Inês ..., a Nun at the Convent of São Bento
      - Gonçalo Vaz de Camões, who inherited his brother for not remaining male children and was at India where he married Margarida da Veiga, and had issue; for his death ran a plea over the Majorat da Camoeira and was given a sentence to António Vaz de Camões, whose descendants possessed it:
        - Duarte de Camões
        - Soror Joana ..., a Nun at the Convent of Paraíso, in Évora
      - Simão de Camões, who succeeded at the Majorat who instituted his cousin Luís Gonçalves de Camões
- Aldonça Anes de Camões, wife of Rui Casco, Alcaide-Mór of Avis, son of Martim Casco, Alcaide-Mór of Avis and wife Teresa Ferreira, and had issue (?)

=== João Vaz de Camões ===
João Vaz de Camões or João de Camões, the second son, lived and lies buried at the Cloister of the See of Coimbra, in a particular Chapel, and has a grave risen up in marble, with half relief figures, with an epitaph of the services he had done to King Afonso V of Portugal, whose Vassal he was, and served the same King at the Wars of Africa and Castile, and was a Corregidor of the Comarca (District) of the Beira, married firstly to Inês Gomes da Silva, natural daughter of Jorge da Silva by an unknown woman and older sister of Brites da Silva and Catarina da Silva (and whose paternal grandfather was a bastard son of Gonçalo Gomes da Silva, Alcaide-Mór of Soure, son of the 1st Lords da Chamusca and a descendant among others from Juan Manuel, Lord of Villena's marriage and from Afonso III of Portugal), and secondly to Catarina Pires, without issue, and had:

- João Vaz de Camões, born in Vila Franca de Xira, who together with his father and stepmother in 1505 were in Coimbra, where they had residence, she securely at the house of the Rua do Deão, and the son at the Bishop's Palace, married to Branca Tavares, and had:
  - Estêvão Vaz de Camões, died in Italy in the Wars of the Emperor, apparently unmarried and without issue
  - Henrique de Freitas, died in India, apparently unmarried and without issue
  - Frei Simão Vaz de Camões, who for having violated the clausure of the Monastery of Santana was condemned to deportation, was at large and died during or for having been wounded at the Battle of Alcântara (1580) fighting for António of Portugal, Prior of Crato
  - Isabel Tavares, died at the last quarter of the 16th century, married 1550/1552 to Álvaro Pinto, and who was daughter of good people but of modest living and couldn't write, as it can be seen at the final part of a deed of 1550, where it is affirmed that someone signed for himself and for the mentioned Isabel Tavares at her beg for not knowing how to sign
  - Dom Bento ...
- António or Antão Vaz de Camões, who was with Afonso de Albuquerque at India, married to Guiomar Vaz da Gama, daughter of a da Gama from Algarve, and for that reason chanted her grandson the actions of Vasco da Gama, with whom she had a reason of kindred, and had:
  - Simão Vaz de Camões, who went to India as a captain of a vessel, was lost and wrecked and reached the shore at the sight of the firm land of Goa and was saved in a board and some time after that died poor at the same City, married to Ana de Sá de Macedo or Ana de Sá, daughter of a de Macedo from Santarém, the parents of:
    - Luís Vaz de Camões, the Poet and great Epic
  - Dom Frei Bento de Camões, a Friar at and the First General Prior of the Monastery of Santa Cruz in Coimbra, who held the office of First Cancelario (Chancellor) of the University of Coimbra, with power to graduate as Licensee and Doctor in every Faculties
- Pêro Vaz de Camões, born in Coimbra, an Esquire in Algarve in 1530 at the service of Dom Luís de Castro, Lord de Monsanto and Lord de Cascais and Alcaide-Mór of Lisbon (called and should have been Count de Monsanto), apparently unmarried and without issue.

=== Constança Pires de Camões ===
Constança Pires de Camões was married to Pedro or Pero Severim, called as a nickname "o Baralha", a French nobleman from the Bishopric of Senlis, who came to the Kingdom of Portugal to Lisbon at the time and serving King John I of Portugal and found himself with him at the taken of Ceuta, after what he came back to the Kingdom, where he married, and had issue, the Severim Family of Portugal.
