= Castle of Avis =

Portuguese medieval castle

- Castelo de Avis
- Portalegre, Cávado, Norte in Portugal
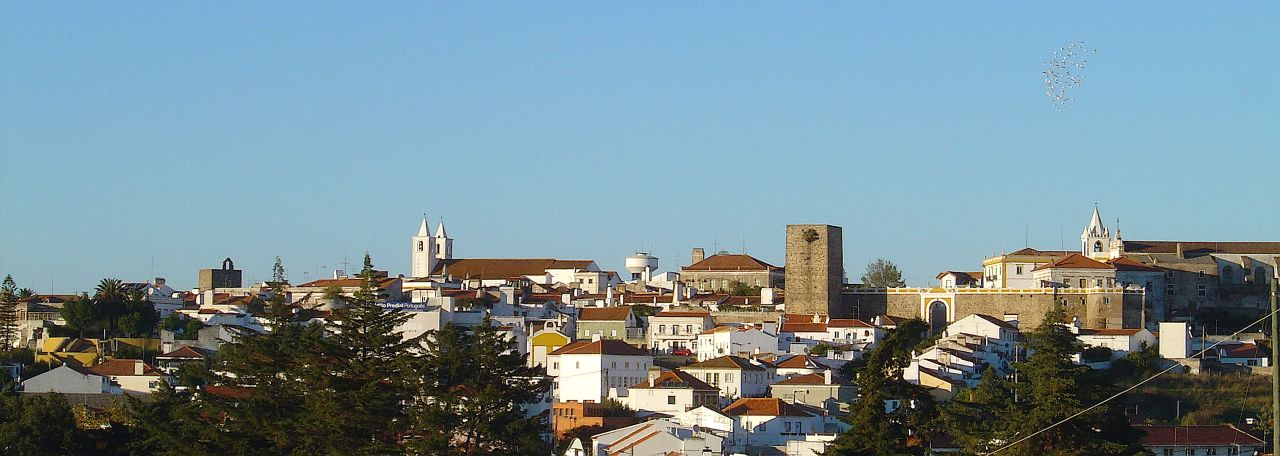
- Portions of the towers and gates of the Castle of Avis, situated on a hilltop

Site information
- Type: Castle
- Owner: Portuguese Republic
- Operator: DRCAlentejo (Ordinance 829/2009; Diário de República, Série 2, 163, 24 August 2009)
- Open to the public: Public

Location
- Coordinates: 39°3′14.5″N 7°53′29.6″W

Site history
- Built: 1211
- Materials: Schist, Limestone, Sand, Clay, Dirt

The Castle of Avis (Portuguese: Castelo de Avis) is a Portuguese medieval castle in civil parish of Avis, in the municipality of the same name, in the Alentejo district of Portalegre.

== History ==
In 1211, D. Afonso II awarded the "lands of Avis" to the Knights of Évora, under the dependency of the Order of Calatrava, in the person of D. Fernão Anes, with the condition that the knight settle the lands and erect a castle. This edict resulted in the settlement of the Military Order of São Bento in Avis, three years later, and the construction of a castle and fortified walls by Master-Prior D. Fernão Anes and Master D. Fernando Rodrigues Monteiro. Immediately, in April 1214 there was an agreement between Fernão Eanes and the Bishop of Évora, D. Soeiro, over the use of the land rents in Évora and settlement of Benavente to support the construction.

On 12 January 1215, D. Mafalda, daughter of D. Sancho I, bequeathed to the Master of Avis the settlement of Seia. By the middle of the year (10 July) D. Afonso II had granted the settlers of Avis a foral (royal charter) similar to that established for Évora, which was confirmed in August 1218 by the King. Martim Fernandes, Master of the Order of Avis signed a new settlement foral on 20 August 1223.

By 1331, Gil Peres, Master of the Order obtained a judgment against the Moor, Mafamede Francelho, who had been appointed alcalde and judge of Avis, thereby making them alcaldes of the castle.

By the 15th century, the fortifications are rehabilitated by the Condestável D. Pedro. It was during this century that the construction of the keep, addorsed to the conventual buildings, and the painting of the same, by order of Master D. Pedro.

In 1473, D. Afonso V authorized the partial demolition of the tower of the Évora Gate, in order to transform it into a dovecote.

Sometime during the 16th century, there were alterations made to the fortifications, while a new foral issued by King D. Manuel. By 1556, the convent record, written by Jorge Lopes, referred to the Keep being the possession of the Masters of Avis.

In the 17th century, the old Porta do Arco de Baixo was concealed and a new Porta do Arco was constructed.

The Agiológio Lusitano (1625), authored by Father Jorge Cardoso, referred to the existence of five towers and six gates.

On 19 October 1654, friar Ambrósio Marques requested that the castle tower addorsed to the convent be demolished, since it threatened the destruction of the building: rubble had previously destroyed the chicken coop as it fell. By the end of the century, during the reign of King John IV, the towers in the northeast and southeast were demolished, and its materials used in the construction of two ravelins in the south and southwest.

In 1708, Father Carvalho da Costa referred to the existence of five towers and six gates, that included the Anjo, Baixo (Queen's Gate), Évora (with a cross), Santo António (also known as the Porta Nova), São Roque and Postigo. In 1730, a description by D. Francisco Xavier do Rego, referred to the existence of six towers (Queen's, Évora, São Roque, Porta de Santo António, Santo António and keep tower) with their associated gates (Anjo, Baixo, Évora, São Roque, Santo António and Postigo). The Parochial Memories of 1758, signed by friar Gaspar Xavier Leitão, referred to a walled town, constituted by a regular square, and by the 17th century, two forts that protected the Èvora and the Santo António Gates. The towers were high, but in ruin since the stones were reused in the construction of the forts, making the castle a constant profile. At this time, the castle included four towers remained unscathed throughout this period, specifically, the Keep Tower, Porta de Santo António Tower, Porta de São Roque Tower and the Masters' Tower (where the friars were incarcerated). The castle was encircled by a river and cliffs, creating a natural barrier and difficult access. By 4 December 1892, in an article within the newspaper O Século, the castle was described as a very old tower, with Gothic windows, each with its own bell.

At the time of the disbanding of the religious orders in Portugal (1834), the Order of Avis had in its possession the control of 18 villages, 49 commendations and 128 priories. As a consequence, the lands controlled by the Order of Avis, in addition to possessions and properties, were sold to individual property-owners and the State.

Between 1915 and 1918, the historic keep tower, which was addorsed to the Convent of São Bento de Avis was demolished.

In 1921, part of the walls alongside the lands of the Monastery of Avis fell apart.

On 30 May 1941, there was a debate to maintain the continuity between the towers, Castle and Hospital of the Misericórdia, and that the property should not be alienated. On 25 November 1943, a letter from the DGEMN was published over the necessity to expropriate some the buildings, in order to remove from the walls and towers of the castle. For many years, homes, buildings and structures were being constructed against the walls, potentially destroying the value and importance of the historical properties. António Pais da Silva Marques wrote to the DGEMN (8 November 1944), where he ridiculed the utopian ideal and pretension in reconstructing the primitive castle, since it would be necessary to demolition the entire settlement, including many of the addorsed houses. On 20 January 1945, it was decided to survey the town and the walls, to analyze the possibility of demolishing some properties, but by 5 March 1947, the investigation had not been concluded nor were there any buildings designated for demolition. Joana Procópio issued a request on 24 November 1953 for intervention by the DGEMN to restore the wall destroyed during a bad storm, since it put here residence in risk of destruction. During a visit to the area in December, it was decided to consolidate the corners of the towers, which were falling apart due to water infiltration.

On 16 June 1955, the municipal council indicated their intention to construct a tourist path over the walls. But, in 1959, the DGEMN reconstructed the walls, and many of the curtains along the Rua dos Muros were consolidated owing to their terrible state. The job was tendered to Odilom Martind Garcia.

A letter from João Lopes Cravitas dated 2 April 1965 solicited the authorization to consolidate the walls near many of the buildings in risk, a project that was budgeted for 500$000 escudos. It was authorized, but with the condition that the public works would be carried through, accompanied by the DREMS. Yet, these repairs were insufficient, and a letter from president of the municipal council (dated 7 August 1970), noted the importance of proceeding with repairs to the walls alongside the hospital of the Santa Casa da Misericórdia.

On 29 August, the volunteer firefighters of Avis requested permission to erect a siren on the south tower of the castle.

== Architecture ==
The castle is addorsed and integrated in to the residential buildings at the top of a hill, dominated by a valley. This high place permitted observation across the vast landscape and visual communication with many of the local fortifications, including the castles of Alter do Chão and Pavia.

The fortification is an example of medieval and transitional architecture, composed of masonry and stone, with mortar and clay limestone. The perpendicular walls and broken by rectangular towers, with bastions.

Of the original six towers constructed during its history, only three remains: the tower of São Roque, Santo António and the Queen's tower. The primary/dominant tower tower keep that include two halls with vaulted ceilings, with sills providing illumination. These spaces were decorated in cork, had a chimney, places for flags and one grated window surmounted by the coat-of-arms of the Avis with inscription. In reality there two historic inscriptions. One on a limestone plaque:

"Era de 1330, a 6 dias de Fevereiro, começárão a fazer este Castello por mandado do Mestre de Aviz Dom Lourenço Affonso, e elle pos a primeira pedra, M.C.C.B.III.C Castello"
It was in 1330, on 6 days of February, they started to make this Castle by order of the Master of Aviz Dom Lourenço Afonso, and he placed the first stone in M.C.C.B.III.C Castille

The second is situated on the keep tower, over the cross of the Order of Aviz:

"Era de 1336 annos a 25. dias andados de Fevereiro, fez este Castello Dom Lourenço Affonso Mestre de Aviz à honra, e Serviço de Deos, e de Santa Maria sua Madre, e das Ordens do muito nobre Senhor Dom Diniz Rey de portugal, e do Algarve, Reynante em aquelle tempo, e em defendimento de seus Reynos. Salvator mundi Salva me".
It was in 1336, on 25 days in February, this castle was built by Dom Lourenço Affonse Master of Avis the honour, and Service to God, and to Holy Mary his Mother, and gave Orders to the great noble Master Dom Dinis King of Portugal, and the Algarve, Reigned in that time, and in defense of his Kingdoms.
