= Francisco Augusto Metrass =

Portuguese painter

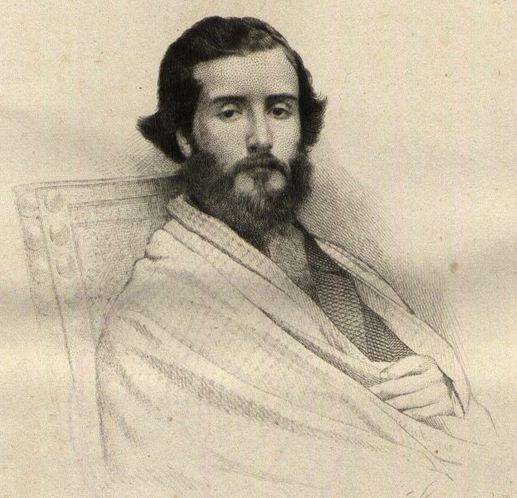
- Drawing of Metrass, 1861
- Born: 7 February 1825; Lisbon
- Died: 14 February 1861 (aged 36); Madeira
- Occupation: Painter
- Years active: 1830s-1850s
- Style: Romantic
- Movement: Nazarene movement

Francisco Augusto Metrass (7 February 1825, Lisbon - 14 February 1861, Madeira) was a Portuguese painter in the Romantic style.

== Biography ==
Metrass came from a wealthy Neapolitan immigrant family that ran an import business. Going against his father's wishes, he began his artistic studies in 1836, when he was eleven, as an unmatriculated student at the Academy of Fine Arts in Lisbon. His teachers there included Joaquim Rafael and António Manuel da Fonseca. Initially, he was a portrait painter.

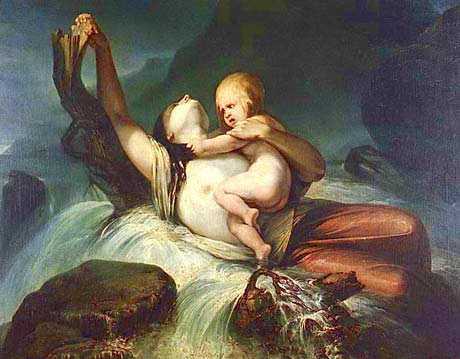
Only God! (1856)

In 1844, he was a student in Rome, where he associated with Johann Friedrich Overbeck, Peter von Cornelius and other German painters, coming under the influence of the Nazarene movement.

Upon returning to Portugal, he abandoned portraits in favor of history painting and held his first exhibition in a palace belonging to Count of Lumiares. His work was not favorably received, so he sold all of his paintings to an auction house and went to France for further studies. In 1853, he was back in Portugal, having changed his style to more resemble that of the old Dutch Masters. His new works found favor with the public and King Fedinand II, who purchased his painting of a scene from the life of Luís Vaz de Camões. He also created some sketches on Orientalist themes, but these proved unsatisfactory.

He was appointed a Professor of history painting at the Academy in 1854 after winning a competition with his painting of Solomon's Judgment. The following year, he had a major showing at the Exposition Universelle.

Suffering from tuberculosis, he became increasingly unable to work. A trip to Italy, seeking a more healthful climate, made his condition worse, so he went to Madeira, thinking the climate might be better, but died there.
