= Anfitriões =

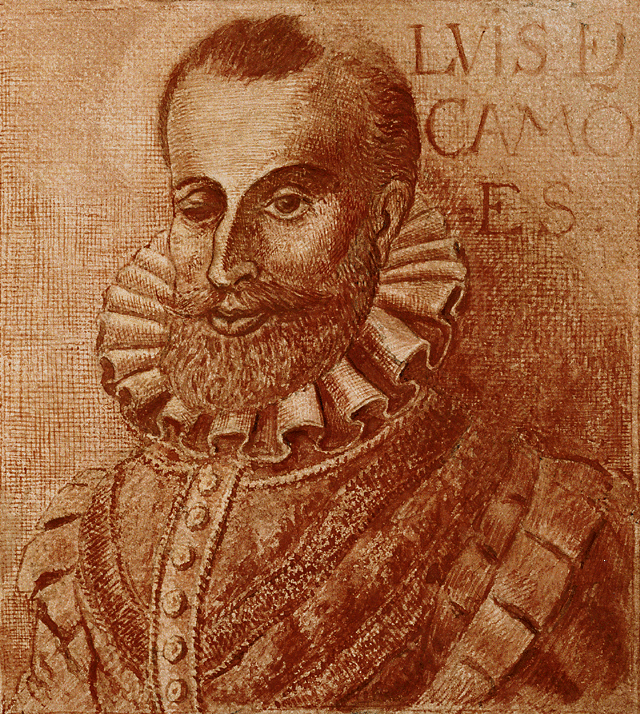
Luís de Camões

Anfitriões is a comedy written by the Portuguese poet Luís de Camões and published in 1587.

It is written in the form of an auto (a one-act morality play) and is as an adaptation of Plautus' Amphitryon, where a comic character is added to the myth of Amphitryon, highlighting the omnipotence of love which even the immortal gods are subject to, in accordance with the Vicentian Tradition. The piece was written in redondilha menor and is bilingual, employing Castilian in the speech of Sósia, a slave, to denote his lower social class in passages which reach grotesque, a technique used in other pieces as well.
