= Ōkyo (crater) =

Crater on Mercury

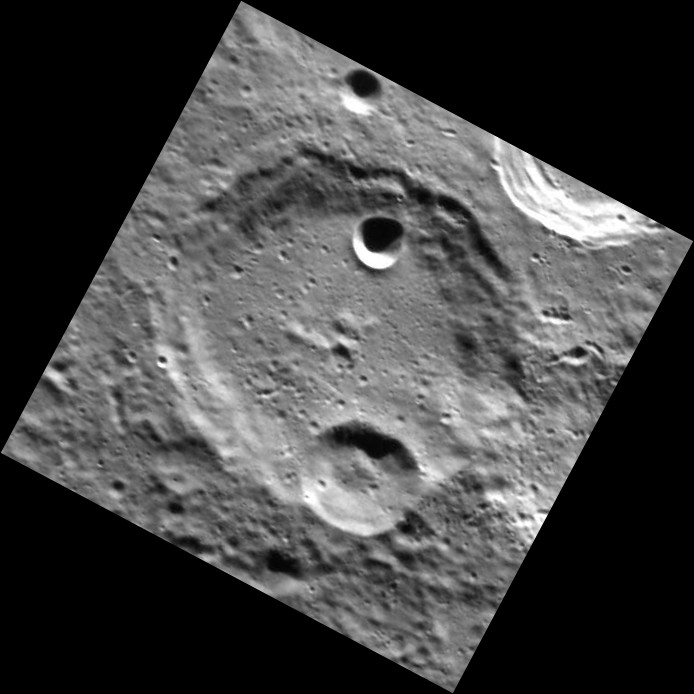
- MESSENGER NAC image of Ōkyo
- Feature type: Central-peak impact crater
- Location: Bach quadrangle, Mercury
- Coordinates: 70.05°S 74.66°W
- Diameter: 66 km
- Eponym: Maruyama Ōkyo

Ōkyo is a crater on Mercury. Its name was adopted by the International Astronomical Union (IAU) in 1985. It is named for the Japanese painter Maruyama Ōkyo, who lived from 1733 to 1795.

To the southeast of Ōkyo is the crater Camões.
