= Avis, Portugal =

Avis
- Municipality
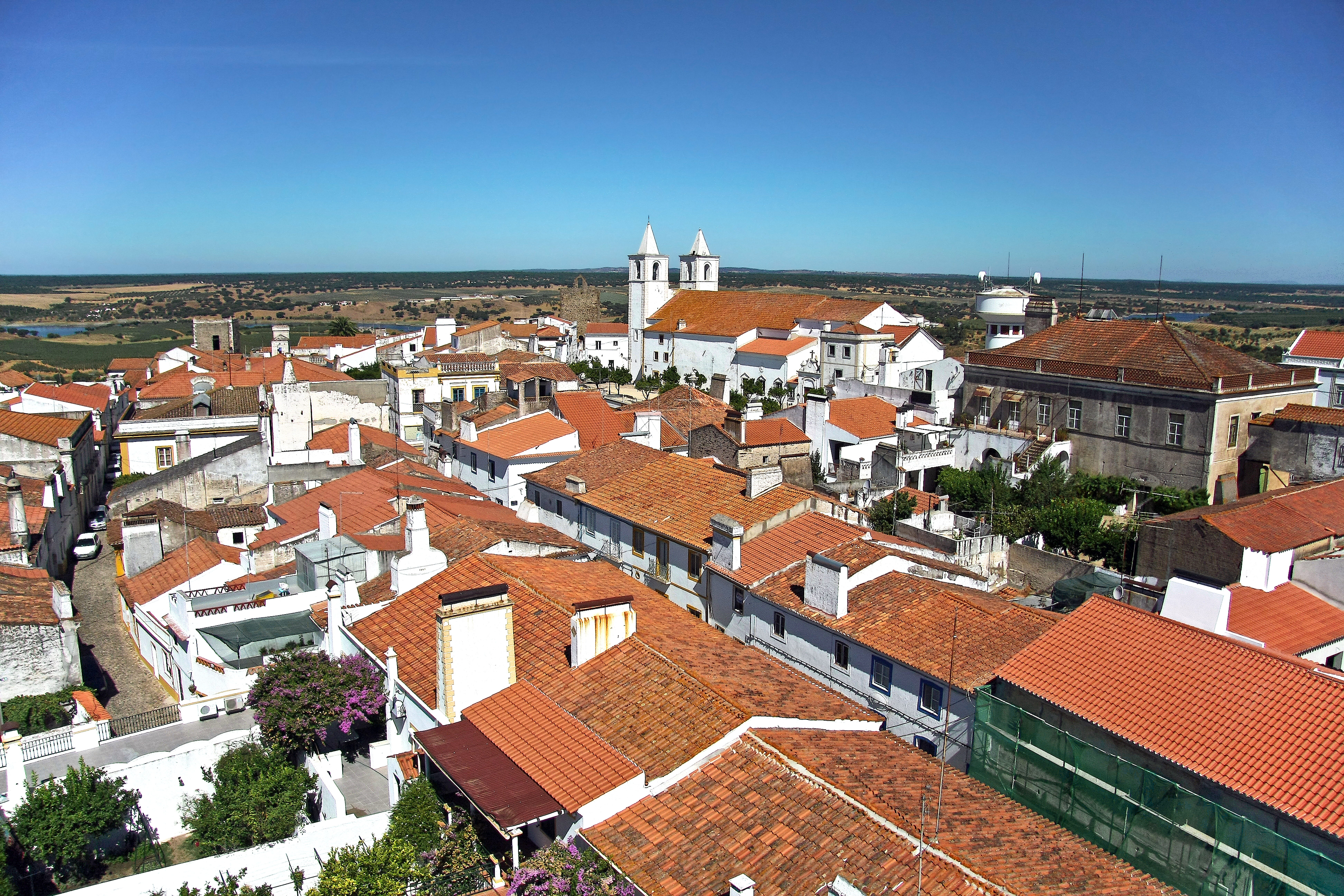
- Avis with the matrice church in the background

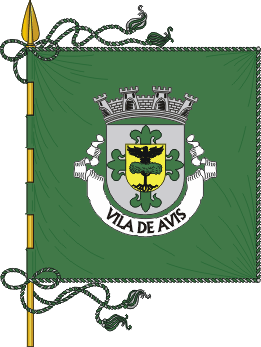
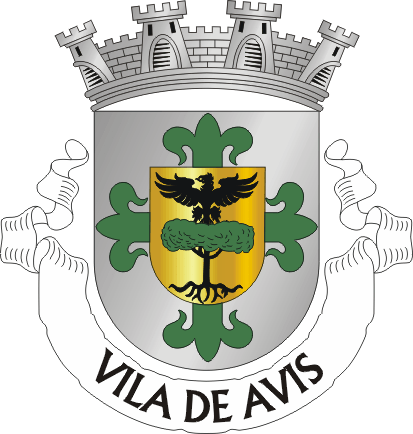
- Flag Coat of arms
- Interactive map of Avis
- Location in Portugal
- Coordinates: 39°03′N 7°53′W
- Country: Portugal
- Region: Alentejo
- Intermunic. comm.: Alto Alentejo
- District: Portalegre
- Parishes: 6

Government
  - President: Nuno Silva (CDU)

Area
  - Total: 605.97 km^{2} (233.97 sq mi)

Population (2011)
  - Total: 4,571
  - Density: 7.543/km^{2} (19.54/sq mi)
- Time zone: UTC+00:00 (WET)
  - Summer (DST): UTC+01:00 (WEST)
- Local holiday: Easter Monday date varies
- Website: http://www.cm-avis.pt

Avis (Portuguese pronunciation: [ɐˈviʃ]), formerly spelled Aviz, is a municipality in the District of Portalegre in Portugal. The population in 2011 was 4,571, in an area of 605.97 km^{2}. The present Mayor is Nuno Silva, elected by the Unitary Democratic Coalition. The municipal holiday is Easter Monday.

== History ==
The fortified city, of which parts have been preserved, was home to the Knights of the Order of Aviz. The Order grew into the Kingdom of Portugal's second dynasty, the House of Aviz, and its name today subsists as one of the Portuguese Republic's highest military honors.

== Gallery ==
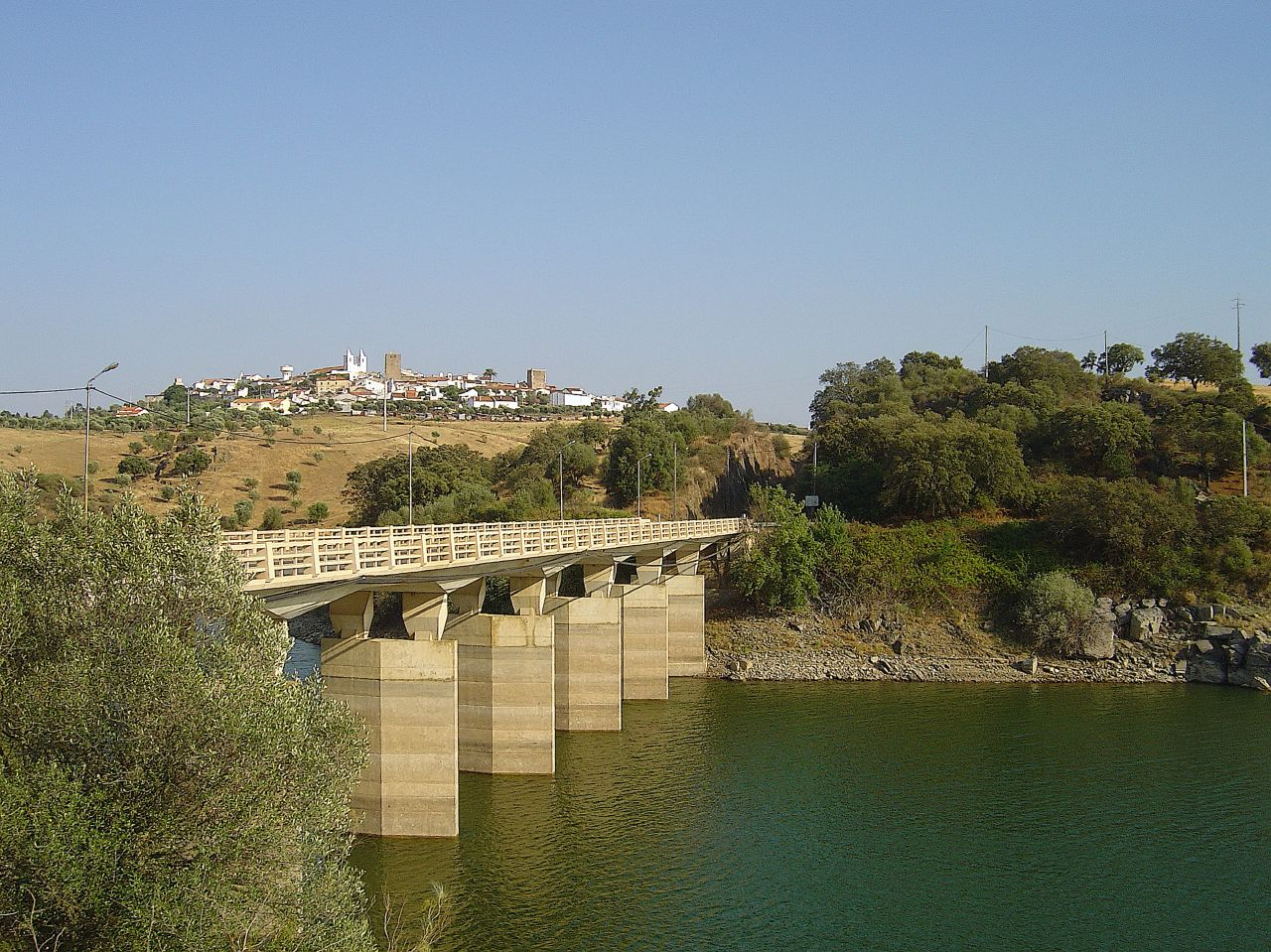
Bridge into the town.

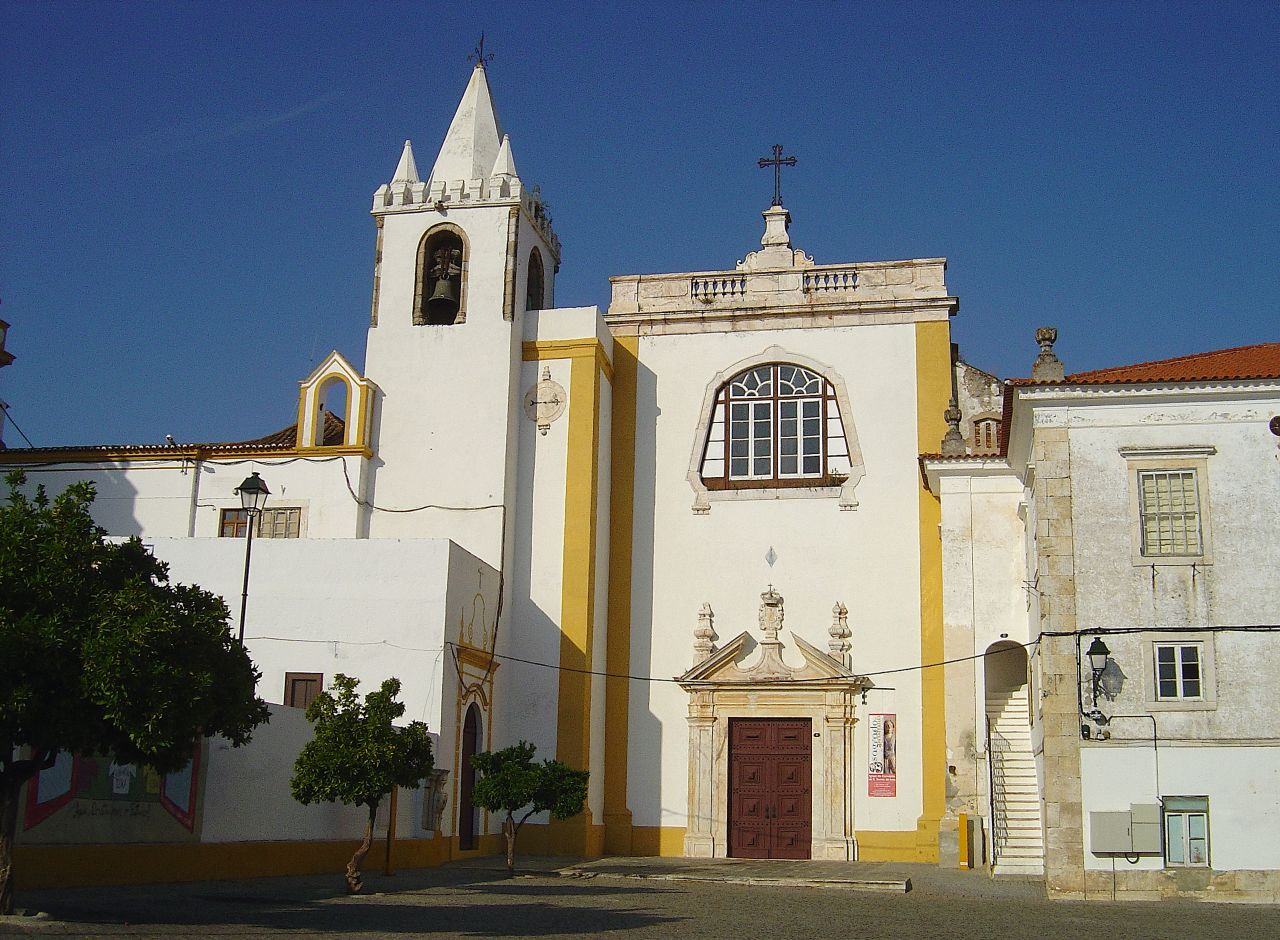
Church and convent of São Bento of Avis.

== Climate ==
Climate data for Benavila, Avis (1991–2020)
Month	Jan	Feb	Mar	Apr	May	Jun	Jul	Aug	Sep	Oct	Nov	Dec	Year
Record high °C (°F)	22.5 (72.5)	24.0 (75.2)	29.7 (85.5)	33.8 (92.8)	37.8 (100.0)	43.2 (109.8)	43.5 (110.3)	45.4 (113.7)	42.6 (108.7)	36.2 (97.2)	25.8 (78.4)	21.5 (70.7)	45.4 (113.7)
Mean daily maximum °C (°F)	14.1 (57.4)	15.9 (60.6)	19.1 (66.4)	21.1 (70.0)	25.1 (77.2)	29.8 (85.6)	33.2 (91.8)	33.5 (92.3)	29.5 (85.1)	23.8 (74.8)	17.6 (63.7)	14.7 (58.5)	23.1 (73.6)
Daily mean °C (°F)	8.8 (47.8)	10.2 (50.4)	13.0 (55.4)	15.0 (59.0)	18.3 (64.9)	22.1 (71.8)	24.6 (76.3)	24.8 (76.6)	22.0 (71.6)	17.8 (64.0)	12.5 (54.5)	9.7 (49.5)	16.6 (61.9)
Mean daily minimum °C (°F)	3.5 (38.3)	4.4 (39.9)	6.9 (44.4)	8.8 (47.8)	11.5 (52.7)	14.3 (57.7)	16.0 (60.8)	16.2 (61.2)	14.5 (58.1)	11.7 (53.1)	7.4 (45.3)	4.6 (40.3)	10.0 (50.0)
Record low °C (°F)	−5.0 (23.0)	−4.2 (24.4)	−3.0 (26.6)	1.9 (35.4)	4.7 (40.5)	7.8 (46.0)	9.6 (49.3)	10.0 (50.0)	7.0 (44.6)	3.4 (38.1)	−2.4 (27.7)	−4.0 (24.8)	−5.0 (23.0)
Average precipitation mm (inches)	62.8 (2.47)	48.0 (1.89)	49.5 (1.95)	50.2 (1.98)	50.4 (1.98)	9.6 (0.38)	1.8 (0.07)	4.3 (0.17)	35.0 (1.38)	79.0 (3.11)	72.1 (2.84)	71.4 (2.81)	534.3 (21.04)
Average precipitation days (≥ 1 mm)	8.7	7.0	7.4	7.4	6.4	1.8	0.3	0.9	3.7	8.1	8.5	8.6	68.7
Source: Instituto Português do Mar e da Atmosfera

Climate data for Benavila, Avis, 1971-2000 normals and extremes
Month	Jan	Feb	Mar	Apr	May	Jun	Jul	Aug	Sep	Oct	Nov	Dec	Year
Record high °C (°F)	21.5 (70.7)	24.7 (76.5)	29.7 (85.5)	33.8 (92.8)	35.5 (95.9)	43.0 (109.4)	43.5 (110.3)	43.0 (109.4)	43.5 (110.3)	34.5 (94.1)	27.0 (80.6)	23.3 (73.9)	43.5 (110.3)
Mean daily maximum °C (°F)	14.0 (57.2)	15.5 (59.9)	18.4 (65.1)	19.6 (67.3)	23.2 (73.8)	28.2 (82.8)	32.0 (89.6)	32.1 (89.8)	29.1 (84.4)	23.1 (73.6)	17.9 (64.2)	14.7 (58.5)	22.3 (72.2)
Daily mean °C (°F)	9.2 (48.6)	10.6 (51.1)	12.7 (54.9)	14.1 (57.4)	17.1 (62.8)	21.1 (70.0)	24.0 (75.2)	24.0 (75.2)	21.8 (71.2)	17.3 (63.1)	13.0 (55.4)	10.3 (50.5)	16.3 (61.3)
Mean daily minimum °C (°F)	4.4 (39.9)	5.7 (42.3)	7.0 (44.6)	8.6 (47.5)	11.0 (51.8)	14.0 (57.2)	16.0 (60.8)	15.9 (60.6)	14.6 (58.3)	11.6 (52.9)	8.0 (46.4)	5.9 (42.6)	10.2 (50.4)
Record low °C (°F)	−4.8 (23.4)	−4 (25)	−3.0 (26.6)	0.0 (32.0)	2.5 (36.5)	5.0 (41.0)	9.9 (49.8)	8.5 (47.3)	7.0 (44.6)	0.0 (32.0)	−4.5 (23.9)	−4.5 (23.9)	−4.8 (23.4)
Average rainfall mm (inches)	77.0 (3.03)	67.0 (2.64)	42.7 (1.68)	53.9 (2.12)	51.9 (2.04)	22.4 (0.88)	5.9 (0.23)	3.9 (0.15)	26.2 (1.03)	63.9 (2.52)	83.5 (3.29)	94.5 (3.72)	592.8 (23.33)
Average rainy days (≥ 0.1 mm)	10.8	10.2	7.4	10.1	8.3	3.7	1.3	1.2	4.2	9.0	9.4	11.5	87.1
Source: Instituto de Meteorologia

== Parishes ==
Administratively, the municipality is divided into 6 civil parishes (freguesias):

- Alcórrego e Maranhão
- Aldeia Velha
- Avis
- Benavila e Valongo
- Ervedal
- Figueira e Barros

== See also ==
- Castelo de Avis
