= Camões (crater) =

Crater on Mercury

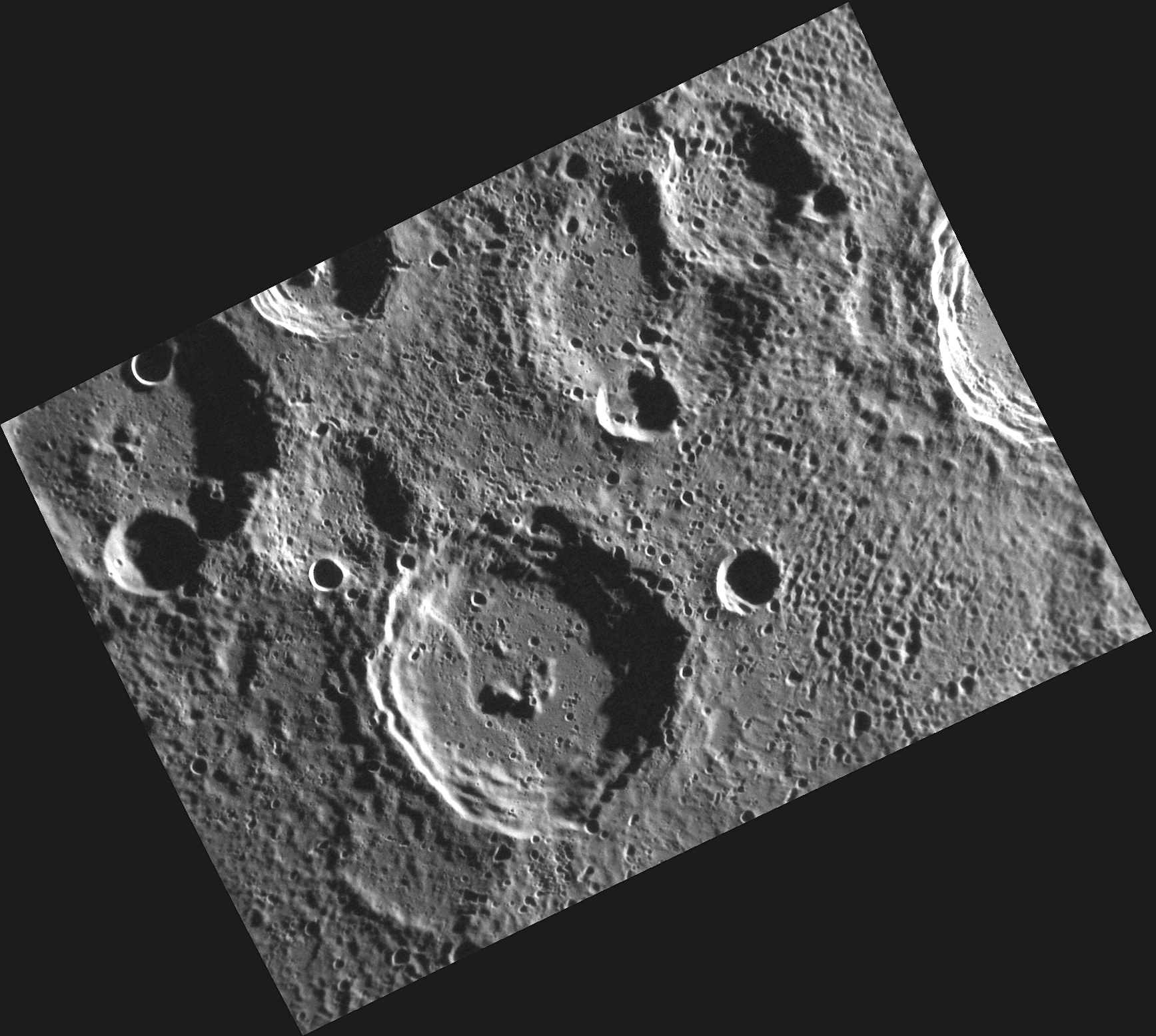
- MESSENGER NAC image of Camões
- Feature type: Impact crater
- Location: Bach quadrangle, Mercury
- Coordinates: 71.42°S 68.39°W
- Diameter: 70 km
- Eponym: Luís de Camões

Camões is a crater on Mercury. It has a diameter of 70 kilometers. Its name was adopted by the International Astronomical Union (IAU) in 1976. Camoes is named for the Portuguese poet Luís de Camões, who lived from 1524 to 1580.

To the northwest of Camões is the crater Ōkyo. To the northeast is Spitteler.
