= Luís de Camões =

Portuguese poet (c. 1524–1580)

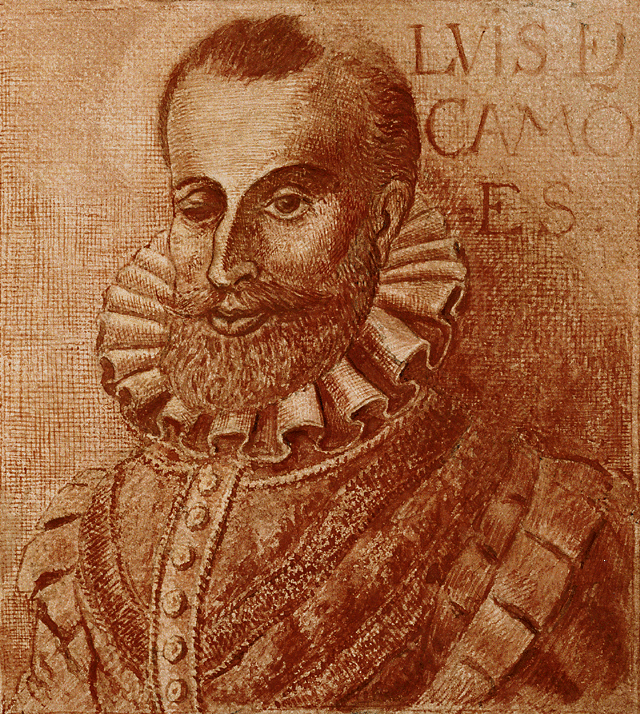
- Portrait c. 1577
- Born: Luís Vaz de Camões c. 1524–1525; Kingdom of Portugal (Note: It is uncertain whether he was born in Lisbon, Coimbra, Constância or Alenquer.)
- Died: 10 June 1580 (aged 55–56); Lisbon, Kingdom of Portugal
- Education: University of Coimbra
- Occupation: Poet
- Relatives: Camões Family
- Writing career
- Period: Portuguese Renaissance
- Genre: Epic poetry
- Notable work: The Lusiads
- Movement: Classicism

Luís Vaz de Camões (European Portuguese: [luˈiʒ ˈvaʒ ðɨ kaˈmõjʃ]; c. 1524 or 1525 – 10 June 1580), sometimes rendered in English as Camoens or Camoëns (/ˈkæmoʊənz/ KAM-oh-ənz), was a Portuguese poet, considered Portugal's and the Portuguese language's greatest poet. His mastery of verse has been compared to that of Shakespeare, Milton, Vondel, Homer, Virgil and Dante. He wrote a considerable amount of lyrical poetry and drama but is best remembered for his epic work Os Lusíadas (The Lusiads). His collection of poetry The Parnasum of Luís de Camões was lost during his life. The influence of his masterpiece Os Lusíadas is so profound that Portuguese is sometimes called the "language of Camões".

The day of his death, 10 June, is Portugal's national day.

Coat of arms of Luís de Camões.

== Life ==
=== Origins and youth ===
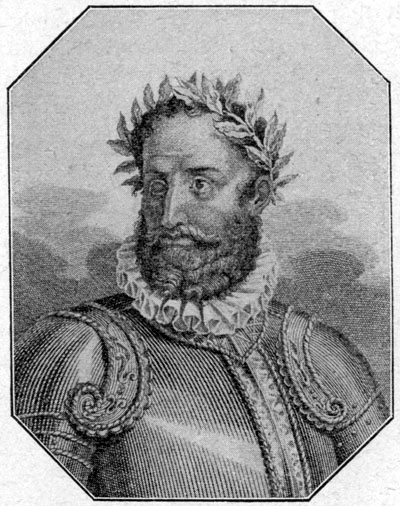
Camões, early 20th century depiction

Much of the information about Luís de Camões' biography raises doubts and, probably, much of what circulates about him is nothing more than the typical folklore that is formed around a famous figure. Only a few dates are documented that guide its trajectory.

The ancestral home of the Camões family had its origins in the Kingdom of Galicia, not far from Cape Finisterre. On his paternal side, Luís de Camões was descended from Vasco Pires de Camões, Galician troubadour, warrior and fidalgo, who moved to Portugal in 1370 and received great benefits from the king in positions, honours and lands, and whose poetry, of a nationalist nature, contributed to ward off Breton and Italian influence and to shape a national troubadour style. His son Antão Vaz de Camões served in the Red Sea and married Dona Guiomar da Gama, related to Vasco da Gama. From this marriage were born Simão Vaz de Camões, who served in the Portuguese Navy and did trade in Guinea and India, and another brother, Bento, who followed the career of a man of letters and entered the priesthood, joining the Austin friars at the Monastery of Santa Cruz, which was a prestigious school for many young Portuguese gentlemen.

Simão married Dona Ana de Sá e Macedo, also from a noble family, from Santarém. Her only son, Luís Vaz de Camões, according to Jayne, Fernandes and some other authors, was born in Lisbon in 1524. Three years later, when the city was threatened by the plague, the family moved to Coimbra, following the royal Court. However, other cities claim the honour of being his birthplace: Coimbra, Santarém and Alenquer. Although the first biographers of Camões, Manuel Severim de Faria and Manuel Correia, initially gave his year of birth as 1517, records of the Lists of the Casa da Índia, later consulted by Manuel de Faria e Sousa, seem to establish that Camões was actually born in Lisbon, in 1524. The arguments for placing his birth outside of Lisbon are weak; but neither is it completely beyond doubt, so the most recent scholarship considers his place and date of birth uncertain.

Much remains unknown regarding his childhood. At twelve or thirteen he would have been protected and educated by his uncle Bento, who sent him to Coimbra to study. Tradition says that he was an undisciplined student, but eager for knowledge, interested in history, cosmography and classic and modern literature. However, his name does not appear in the records of the University of Coimbra, but it is certain from his elaborate style and the profusion of erudite quotes that appear in his works that in some way he received a solid education. It is possible that his uncle himself, a chancellor of the university and the prior of the Monastery of Santa Cruz, instructed him or that he studied at the monastery college. At about twenty years of age he probably moved to Lisbon, before completing his studies. His family was poor, but being noble, he could be admitted to the court of John III where he established fruitful intellectual contacts and began his career as a poet.

It was suggested that he earned his living as a preceptor of Francisco, son of the Count of Linhares, D. António de Noronha, but this now seems hardly plausible. It is also said that he adopted a bohemian lifestyle, frequenting taverns and getting involved in tumultuous love affairs. Several ladies are cited by name in late biographies of the poet as having been the object of his affection, but those identifications are currently considered apocryphal additions to his legend. Among them, for example, there was talk of a passion for Infanta Dona Maria, sister of the king, but that audacity would have earned him time in prison. Another was Catarina de Ataíde, with whom he allegedly had a frustrated love affair that resulted in his self-exile, first in Ribatejo, and then by enlisting as a soldier in Ceuta. The reason for the latter trip is doubtful, but the trip itself is accepted fact; he remained there two years and lost his right eye in a naval battle in the Strait of Gibraltar. Back in Lisbon, he wasted no time in resuming his bohemian life.

A document dating from 1550 states that he had enlisted to travel to India: "Luís de Camões, son of Simão Vaz and Ana de Sá, living in Lisbon, at Mouraria; squire, 25 years old, ginger bearded, brought his father as guarantor; goes on the ship of S. Pedro dos Burgaleses ... among the men-at-arms". As it turns out, he didn't board immediately. In a Corpus Christi procession, he got into an altercation with a certain Gonçalo Borges, employee of the Royal Palace, and wounded him with a sword. Sentenced to prison, he later received a letter of pardon and was released by royal order on 7 March 1553, which says: "he is a young man and poor and he is going to serve in India this year". Manuel de Faria e Sousa found in the registers of the Armada of India, for that year 1553, under the title "Gente de guerra" ("Men of war"), the following statement: "Fernando Casado, son of Manuel Casado and Branca Queimada, residents of Lisbon, squire; Luís de Camões, son of Simão Vaz and Ana de Sá, squire, took his place; and he received 2400 like the others".

Camões set sail on Palm Sunday, 24 March 1553. His last words, he says in a letter, were those of Scipio Africanus, "Ingrata patria, non possidebis ossa mea" (Ungrateful fatherland, you will not possess my bones).

=== Journey to the East ===
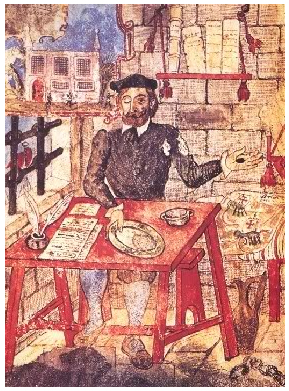
Camões in Goa prison, in anonymous painting from 1556

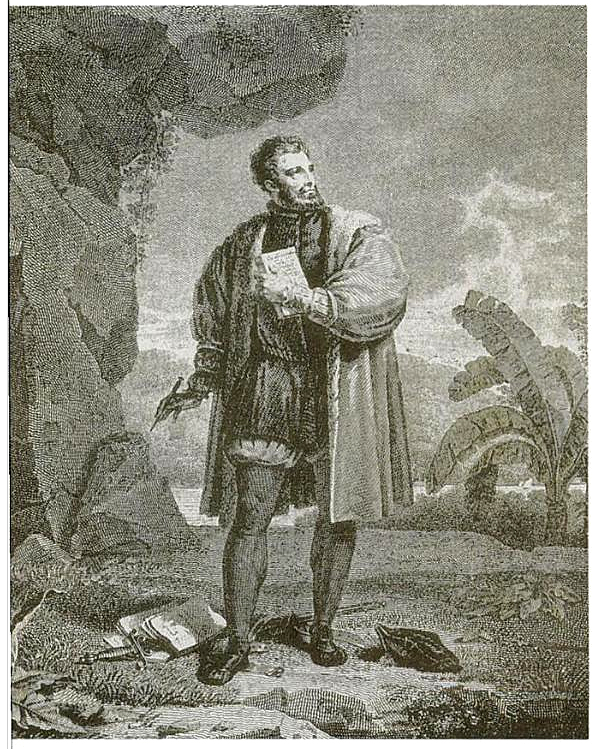
Camões in the cave of Macau, in an engraving by Desenne, 1817

He traveled aboard the carrack São Bento, belonging to the fleet of Fernão Álvares Cabral, which left the Tagus on 24 March 1553. During the trip he passed through the regions where Vasco da Gama had sailed, faced a storm in the Cape of Good Hope where the three other ships in the fleet were lost, and landed in Goa in 1554. Soon he enlisted in the service of the viceroy Afonso de Noronha and fought in the expedition against the king of Chembé (or "da Pimenta"). In 1555, Noronha's successor D. Pedro Mascarenhas ordered Manuel de Vasconcelos to fight the Moors in the Red Sea. Camões accompanied him, but the squadron did not find the enemy and went to winter in Ormuz, in the Persian Gulf.

Probably at this time he had already started writing Os Lusíadas. When he returned to Goa in 1556, he met D. Francisco Barreto in the government, and composed for him the "Auto de Filodemo", which suggests that Barreto looked upon Camões with favor. The early biographers, however, differ about Camões' relations with that ruler. At the same time, an anonymous satire criticizing the prevalence of immorality and corruption, which was attributed to Camões, also was published. Since satires were condemned by the Ordinances of King Manuel, Camões would have been arrested for that. But it has also been hypothesized that the arrest was actually for debts that Camões had incurred. It is possible that he remained in prison until 1561, and that he may have been convicted of additional offenses before then. At any rate, when D. Francisco Coutinho assumed the governorship of India, Camões was released and came under that man's employ and protection. He was appointed to the position of Superintendent for the Dead and Missing for Macau in 1562, serving de facto from 1563 until 1564 or 1565. At that time, Macau was a trading post still in formation and almost uninhabited. Tradition says that there he wrote part of Os Lusíadas in a cave, which later was named after him.

On the trip back to Goa, he was shipwrecked, as tradition says, near the mouth of the Mekong River, managing to save only himself and the manuscript of Os Lusíadas, an event that inspired the famous redondilha "Sôbolos rios que vão", considered by António Sérgio the "backbone" of the Camonian lyric, as is repeatedly cited in the critical literature. The trauma of the shipwreck, in the words of Leal de Matos, had the most profound impact on redefining the themes of Os Lusíadas, this being noticeable beginning with Canto VII, a fact already noted by Diogo do Couto, a friend of the poet who partly accompanied the work as it was being written.

His rescue took months to occur, and there is no record of how it happened, but he was taken to Malacca, where he received a new arrest warrant for misappropriating the assets of the dead that had been entrusted to him. The exact date of his return to Goa is not known, but he may have remained in prison there for some time. Couto says that in the shipwreck Dinamene, a Chinese maiden with whom Camões had fallen in love, died, but Ribeiro and others reject that story. The next viceroy, D. Antão de Noronha, was a longtime friend of Camões, having first met him during his Morocco adventure. Certain biographers claim that he was promised a position at the trading post at Chaul, but he did not take up the position. Severim de Faria said that the final years spent in Goa were occupied with poetry and military activities, where he always showed bravery, readiness and loyalty to the Crown.

It is difficult to determine what his daily life in the East would have been like, beyond what can be extrapolated from his military status. It seems certain that he always lived modestly and may have shared a house with friends, "in one of those collective dwellings where it was customary for people from the homeland to associate", as Ramalho notes. Some of these friends must have been in possession of a certain degree of culture and would have provided illustrious companionship. Ribeiro, Saraiva and Moura admit that he may have encountered, among other figures, Fernão Mendes Pinto, Fernão Vaz Dourado, Fernão Álvares do Oriente, Garcia de Orta and the aforementioned Diogo do Couto, creating opportunities for debating literary topics and the like. He may also have attended lectures at one of Goa's colleges or religious establishments.

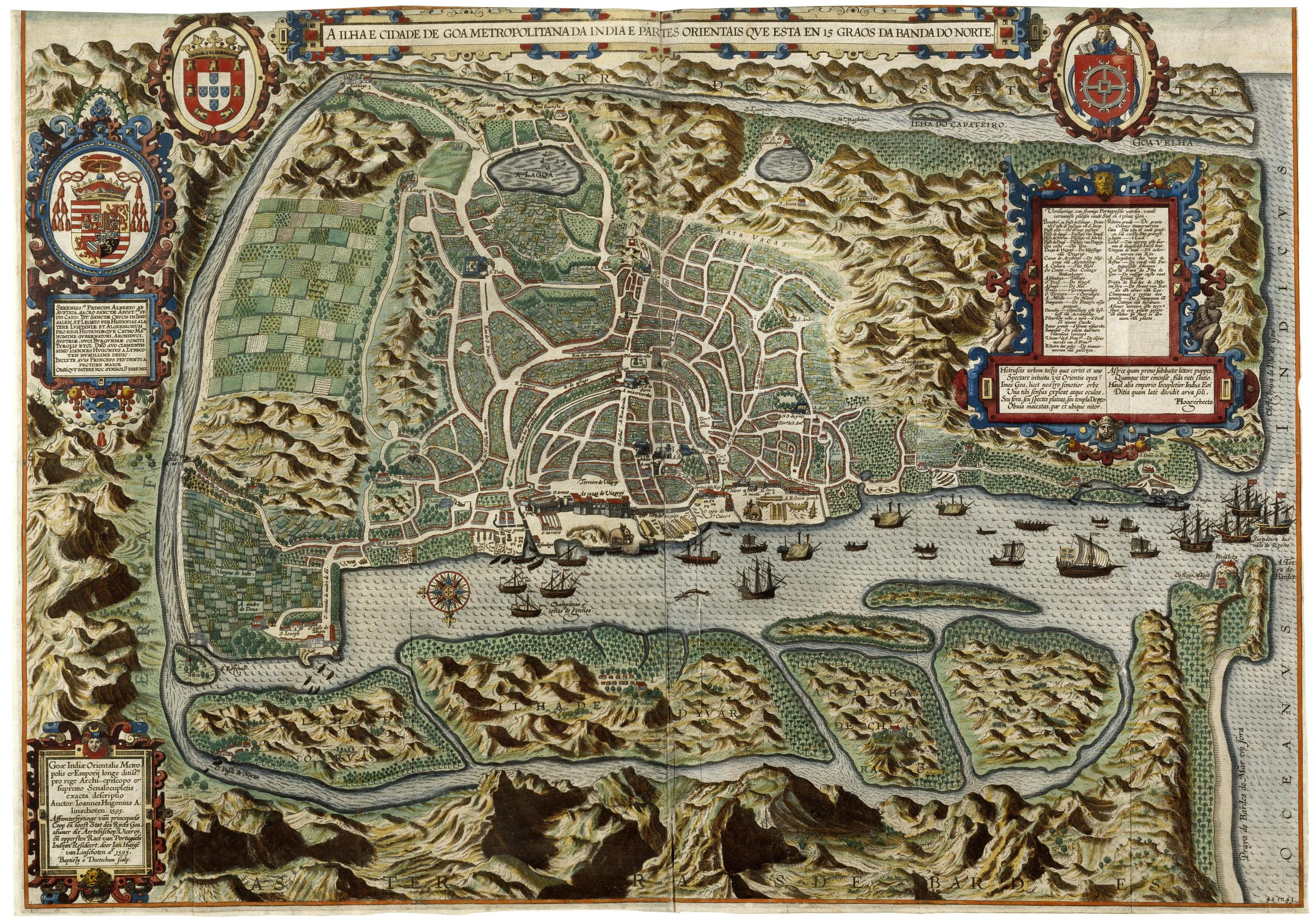
Portuguese Goa, circa 1600.

Ribeiro adds that "These fellows who lived in Goa, far from their homeland and family, between campaigns against the Turk (which took place in the summer) and many of them having little to do (in winter), in addition to the aforementioned lectures and constant readings (including many of the classics: Ovid, Horace, Virgil), enjoying the company of women and musical gatherings, living among themselves without regard to social distinctions, their main objective was to have fun as much as possible, even when writing poetry. Thus their predilection for satire, which had a strongly negative social impact and exposed them to imprisonment per the Manueline Ordinances (Title LXXIX), and therefore carried an edge of adventure and risk. An example of this is the "Tournament Satire", a mockery that is mentioned by Faria e Sousa and about which, unlike "Os Disparates da Índia", there is no scholarly contestation of its Camonian authorship; it may in fact be the reason for one of Camões' arrests."

At such meetings the participants were both men-at-arms and men of letters, and were in search not only of military success and material fortune, but also of the fame and glory born of culture. This was one of the great aspirations of the Humanism of that era, and from it may have sprung the idea of creating an academy, reproducing within the limitations of the local context, the model of Renaissance academies such as the one founded in Florence by Marsilio Ficino and his circle, where Neoplatonic ideals were cultivated.

=== Return to Portugal ===
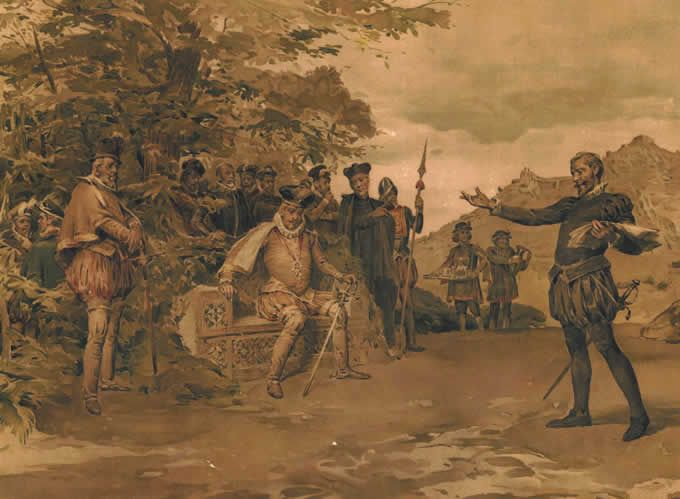
Camões reading Os Lusíadas to King Sebastian, in lithography from 1893.

Whether it was by invitation, or simply a matter of taking the chance to bridge part of the distance that separated him from his homeland, it is not known for certain, but in December 1567 Camões embarked on Pedro Barreto's ship to Sofala, on the Island of Mozambique, where Barreto had been appointed governor, and there Camões would wait for transport to Lisbon at a future date. The early biographers say that Pedro Barreto was treacherous, making false promises to Camões, so that after two years Diogo do Couto found him in a precarious state:

In Mozambique we found that Prince of Poets of his day, my companion and friend Luís de Camões, so poor that he was dependent on friends to feed him. Upon embarking for the kingdom we gathered all the clothing that he needed, and there was no shortage of people who gave him to eat. And that winter that he was in Mozambique, having just finished his Lusíadas in preparation for printing, he had been writing a great deal in another book which he entitled "The Parnassus of Luís de Camões", it being a book of great erudition, doctrine and philosophy, but which was stolen from him.

While attempting to set sail with Couto, Camões found his departure embargoed in the amount of two hundred cruzados by Barreto, demanding reimbursement for monies spent on the poet's behalf. His friends, however, collected the amount and Camões was released, arriving in Cascais aboard the carrack Santa Clara on 7 April 1570.

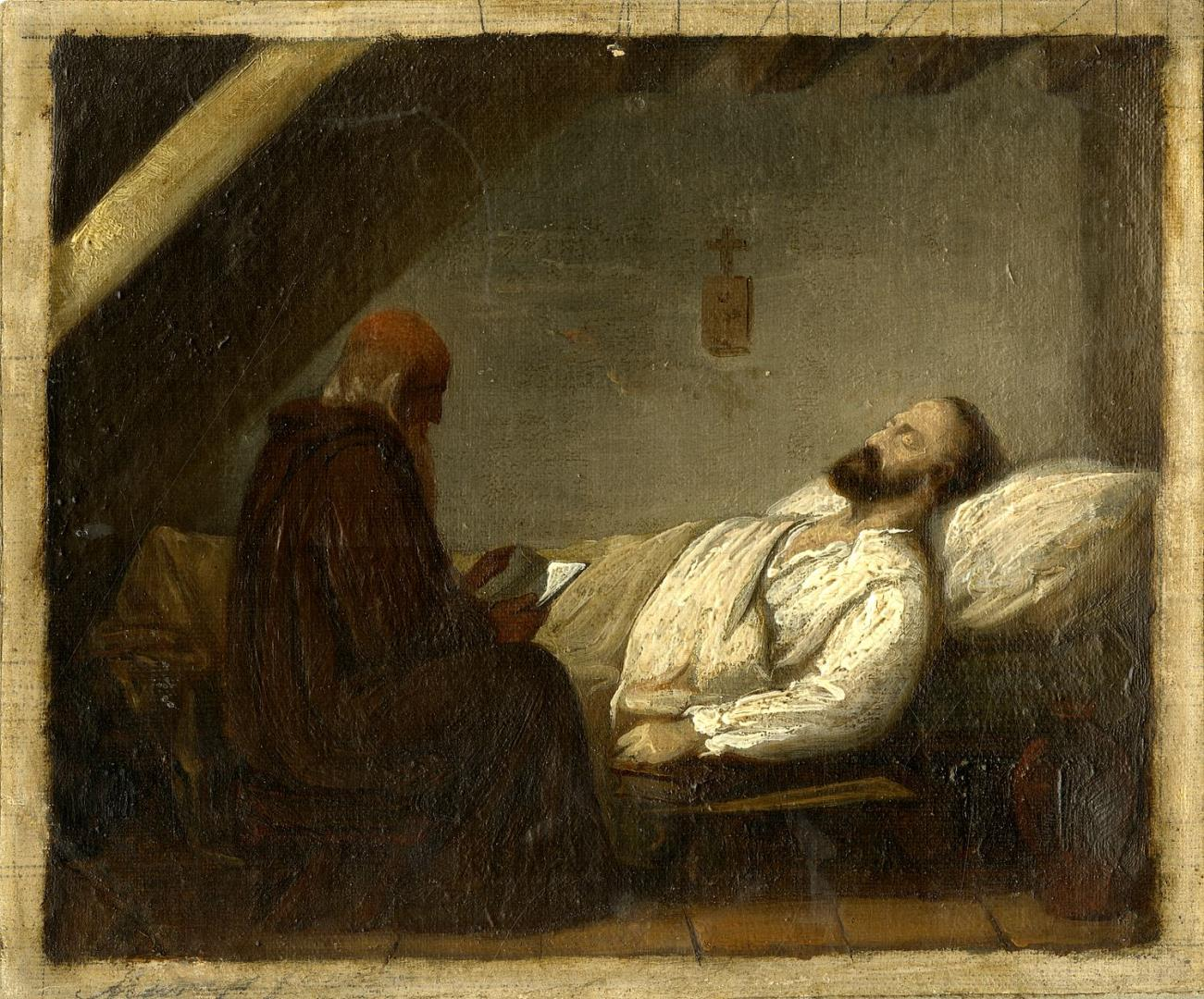
The Death of Camões, by Francisco Augusto Metrass, at the Museum of Lisbon.

After so many adventures, he finally completed Os Lusíadas, presenting them in recitation to Sebastian. The king, still a teenager, ordered the work to be published in 1572, also granting a small pension to "Luís de Camões, noble knight of my House", in payment for services rendered in India. The value of the pension did not exceed fifteen thousand réis a year, which, if not generous, was also not as miserly as has been suggested, considering that the Royal Palace's ladies-in-waiting received around ten thousand réis. For a veteran soldier, the sum must have been considered sufficient and honorable at the time. But the pension would've only lasted for three years, and although the grant was renewable, it seems that it was paid irregularly, causing the poet to experience material difficulties.

Camões lived out his final years in a room in a house near the Convent of Santa Ana, in a state, according to tradition, of the most unworthy poverty, "without a rag to cover him". Le Gentil considered this view a romantic exaggeration, as he was still able to keep a slave named Jau, whom he had brought with him from the east, and official documents attest that he had some means of livelihood. After being embittered by the Portuguese defeat at the Battle of Alcácer Quibir, in which Sebastian disappeared, leading Portugal to lose its independence to the Spanish crown, (Note: Foreseeing the Spanish invasion, Camões wrote to his old friend and Captain General of Lamego, D. Francisco de Almeida: "All will see that so dear to me was my country that I was content to die not only in it but with it") he was stricken by bubonic plague, according to Le Gentil. He was transported to a hospital and died on 10 June 1580, being buried, according to Faria e Sousa, in a shallow grave in the Convent of Santa Ana, or in the cemetery of the poor in the same hospital, according to Teófilo Braga. His mother, having survived him, began to receive his pension as an inheritance. The receipts, found at Torre do Tombo, the Portuguese national archive, document the date of the poet's death, although an epitaph written by D. Gonçalo Coutinho has been preserved which mistakenly assigns his death to the year 1579. After the 1755 earthquake which destroyed most of Lisbon, attempts were made to find the remains of Camões, but to no avail. The bones deposited in 1880 in a tomb in the Jerónimos Monastery are, in all probability, someone else's.

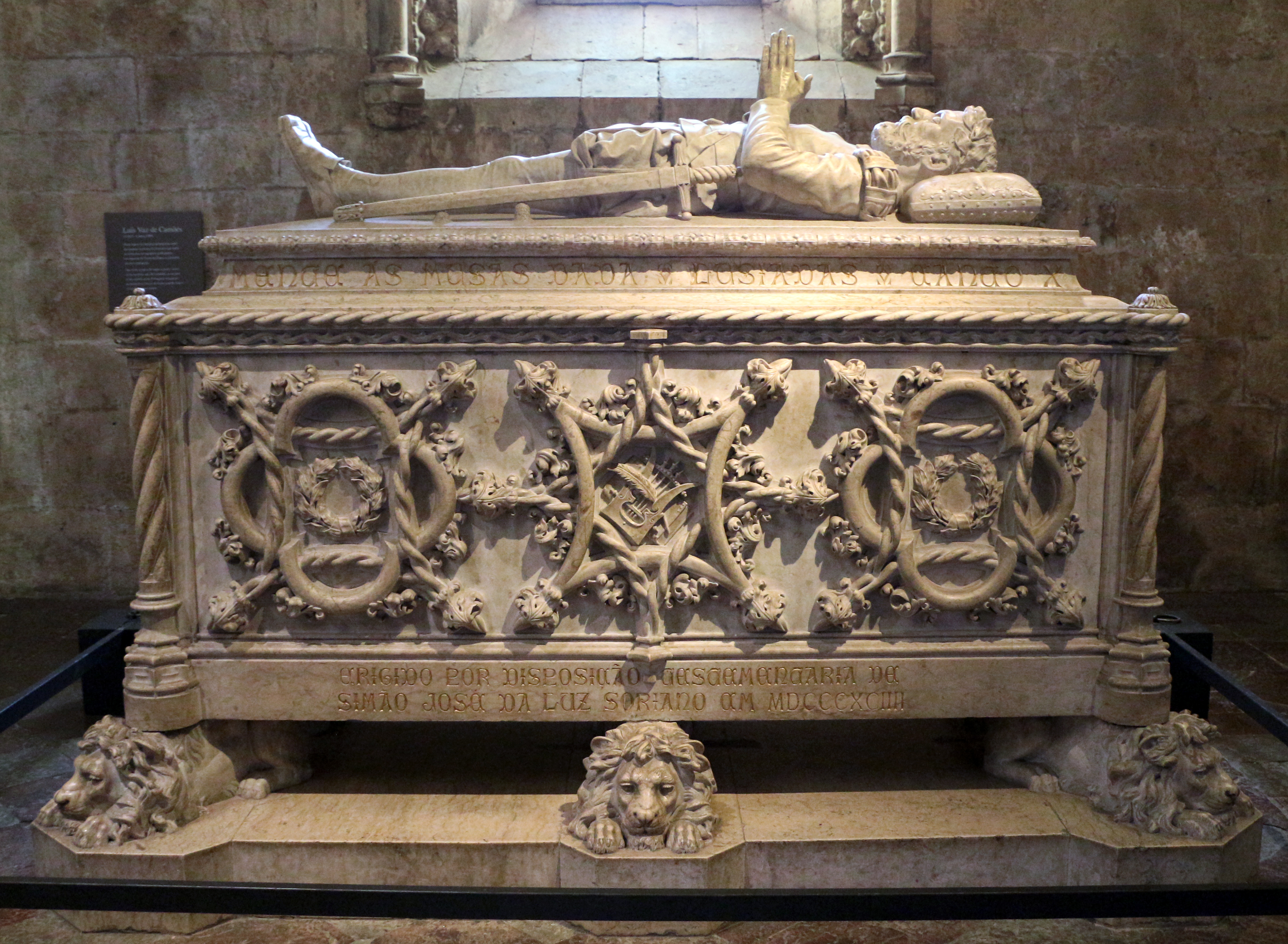
Tomb of the poet at the Jerónimos Monastery

== Appearance, character, loves and iconography ==
The testimonies of his contemporaries describe him as a man of average size, with reddish blond hair, blind in his right eye, skilled in all physical exercises and with a temperamental disposition, having little difficulty in engaging in fights. It is said that he had great value as a soldier, exhibiting courage, combativeness, a sense of honor and willingness to serve, a good companion in his spare time, liberal, cheerful and witty when the blows of fortune did not overwhelm his spirit and sadden him. He was aware of his merit as a man, as a soldier and as a poet.

All efforts made to discover the definitive identity of his muse were in vain and several contradictory proposals were made about women allegedly present in his life. Camões himself suggested, in one of his poems, that there were several muses to inspire him, when he said "in various flames it was often burning". The names of ladies supposed to have been his loved ones that appear in his poems are always used generically, and can therefore be ideal figures; no mention of any ladies identifiable by name is given in the poet's first biographies, those of Pedro de Mariz and that of Severim de Faria, who only collected rumors about "some loves in Paço da Rainha (the Queen's Household)". Reference to Catarina de Ataíde only appeared in the edition of Rimas de Faria e Sousa, in the middle of the 17th century and to the Infanta on José Maria Rodrigues, which was only published in the early 20th century. The celebrated Dinamene also appears to be a poetic image rather than a real person. Ribeiro proposed several alternatives to explain it: the name might have been a cryptonym of Dona Joana Meneses (DIna = D.Ioana + Mene), one of his possible loves, who died on the way to the Indies and was buried in the sea, daughter of Violante, countess of Linhares, whom he would also have loved in Portugal, and pointed out the occurrence of the name Dinamene in poems written probably around the arrival in India, before proceeding to China, where it is said that he would have found the girl. He also referred to the opinion of researchers who claim the mention of Couto, the only primitive reference to the Chinese outside of the Camonian work itself, to have been falsified, being introduced a posteriori, with the possibility that it is even a spelling error, a corruption of "dignamente" ("worthily"). In the final version of Couto's manuscript, the name would not even have been cited, even though proving it is difficult with the disappearance of the manuscript.

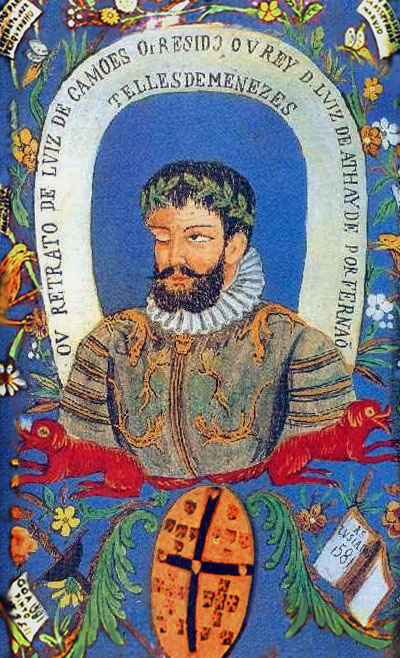
The portrait painted in Goa, 1581

Probably executed between 1573 and 1575, the so-called "portrait painted in red", illustrated at the opening of the article, is considered by Vasco Graça Moura as "the only and precious reliable document we have to know the features of the epic, portrayed in life by a professional painter ". What is known of this portrait is a copy, made at the request of the 3rd Duke of Lafões, executed by Luís José Pereira de Resende between 1819 and 1844, from the original that was found in a green silk bag in the rubble of the fire at the palace of the Counts of Ericeira, which has since disappeared. It is a "very faithful copy" that:

[D]ue to the restricted dimensions of the drawing, the texture of the blood, creating spots of distribution of values, the rigor of the contours and the definition of the contrasted planes, the reticulated neutral that harmonizes the background and highlights the bust of the portrait, the type of the wrap around limits from which the enlightening signature runs down, in short, the symbolic apparatus of the image, captured in the pose of a graphic book illustration, was intended for the opening of an engraving on a copper plate, to illustrate one of the first editions of The Lusiads...

Also surviving is a miniature painted in India in 1581, by order of Fernão Teles de Meneses and offered to the viceroy D. Luís de Ataíde, who, according to testimonies of the time, was very similar to him in appearance. Another portrait was found in the 1970s by Maria Antonieta de Azevedo, dated 1556 and showing the poet in prison. The first medal with its effigy appeared in 1782, ordered to mint by the Baron of Dillon in England, where Camões is crowned with laurels and dressed in coat of arms, with the inscription "Apollo Portuguez / Honor de Hespanha / Nasceo 1524 / Morreo 1579". In 1793, a reproduction of this medal was coined in Portugal, by order of Tomás José de Aquino, Librarian of the Real Mesa Censória.

Over the centuries the image of Camões was represented numerous times in engraving, painting and sculpture, by Portuguese and foreign artists, and several monuments were erected in his honor, notably the great Monument to Camões installed in 1867 in Praça de Luís de Camões, in Lisbon, by Victor Bastos, which is the center of official public ceremonies and popular demonstrations. He was also honored in musical compositions, appeared with his effigy on medals, currency notes, stamps and coins, and as a character in novels, poetry and plays. The film Camões, directed by José Leitão de Barros, was the first Portuguese film to participate in the Cannes Film Festival, in 1946. Among the famous artists who took him as a model for his works are Bordalo Pinheiro, José Simões de Almeida, Francisco Augusto Metrass, António Soares dos Reis, Horace Vernet, José Malhoa, Vieira Portuense, Domingos Sequeira and Lagoa Henriques. A crater on the planet Mercury and an asteroid in the main belt were named after him.

== Work ==
=== Context ===
Camões lived in the final phase of the European Renaissance, a period marked by many changes in culture and society, which mark the end of the Middle Ages and the beginning of the Modern Age and the transition from feudalism to capitalism. It was called "renaissance" due to the rediscovery and revaluation of the cultural references of Classical Antiquity, which guided the changes of this period towards a humanist and naturalist ideal that affirmed the dignity of man, placing him at the center of the universe, making him the researcher par excellence of nature, and promoting reason and science as arbitrators of manifest life. During this period, several scientific instruments were invented and several natural laws and physical entities previously unknown were discovered; the knowledge of the face of the planet itself changed after the discoveries of the great navigations. The spirit of intellectual speculation and scientific research was on the rise, causing Physics, Mathematics, Medicine, Astronomy, Philosophy, Engineering, Philology and several other branches of knowledge to reach a level of complexity, efficiency and accuracy unprecedented, which led to an optimistic conception of human history as a continuous expansion and always for the better. In a way, the Renaissance was an original and eclectic attempt to harmonize pagan Neoplatonism with the Christian religion, eros with charitas, together with oriental, Jewish and Arab influences, and where the study of magic, astrology and the occult was not absent. It was also the time when strong national states began to be created, commerce and cities expanded and the bourgeoisie became a force of great social and economic importance, contrasting with the relative decline in the influence of religion in world affairs.

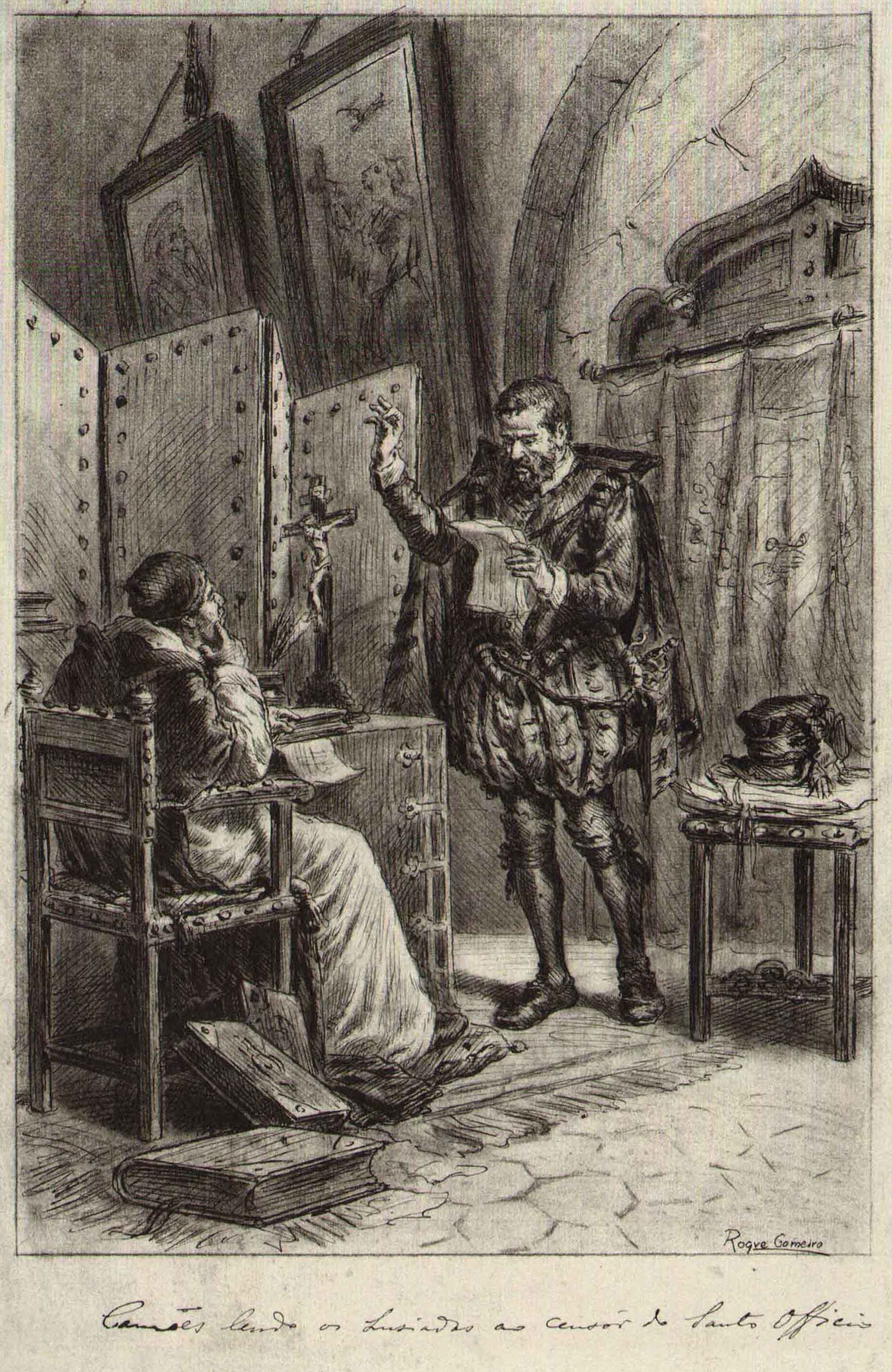
"Camões Reading Os Lusíadas to the Inquisition Censor" (c.1900) by Roque Gameiro.

In the 16th century, the time in which Camões lived, the influence of the Italian Renaissance expanded throughout Europe. However, several of its most typical features were declining, in particular because of a series of political disputes and wars that altered the European political map, with Italy losing its place as a power, and the split of Catholicism, with the emergence of the Protestant Reformation. In the Catholic reaction, Counter-Reformation was launched, the Inquisition was reactivated and ecclesiastical censorship was rekindled. At the same time, Machiavelli's doctrines became widespread, dissociating ethics from the practice of power. The result was the reaffirmation of the power of religion over the profane world and the formation of an agitated spiritual, political, social and intellectual atmosphere, with strong doses of pessimism, reverberating unfavorably on the former freedom that artists enjoyed. Despite this, the intellectual and artistic acquisitions of the High Renaissance that were still fresh and shining before the eyes could not be forgotten immediately, even if their philosophical substrate could no longer remain valid in the face of new political, religious and social facts. The new art that was made, although inspired by the source of classicism, translated it into restless, anxious, distorted, ambivalent forms, attached to intellectualist preciosities, characteristics that reflected the dilemmas of the century and define the general style of this phase as mannerist.

Since the middle of the 15th century, Portugal had established itself as a great naval and commercial power, its arts were developing and enthusiasm for maritime conquests was boiling. The reign of D. João II was marked by the formation of a feeling of national pride, and in the time of D. Manuel I, as Spina & Bechara say, pride had given way to delirium, to the pure euphoria of world domination. At the beginning of the 16th century, Garcia de Resende lamented that there was no one who could celebrate so many feats worthily, claiming that there was epic material superior to that of the Romans and Trojans. Filling this gap, João de Barros wrote his cavalry novel, "A Crónica do Imperador Clarimundo" (1520), in epic format. Shortly thereafter, António Ferreira appeared, establishing himself as a mentor of the classicist generation and challenging his contemporaries to sing the glories of Portugal in high style. When Camões appeared, the land was prepared for the apotheosis of the homeland, a homeland that had fought hard to conquer its sovereignty, first of the Moors and after Castile, had developed an adventurous spirit that had taken it across the oceans, expanding the known borders of the world and opening new routes of trade and exploration, defeating enemy armies and the hostile forces of nature. But at this point, however, the political and cultural crisis was already being announced, materializing shortly after his death, when the country lost its sovereignty to Spain.

=== Overview ===
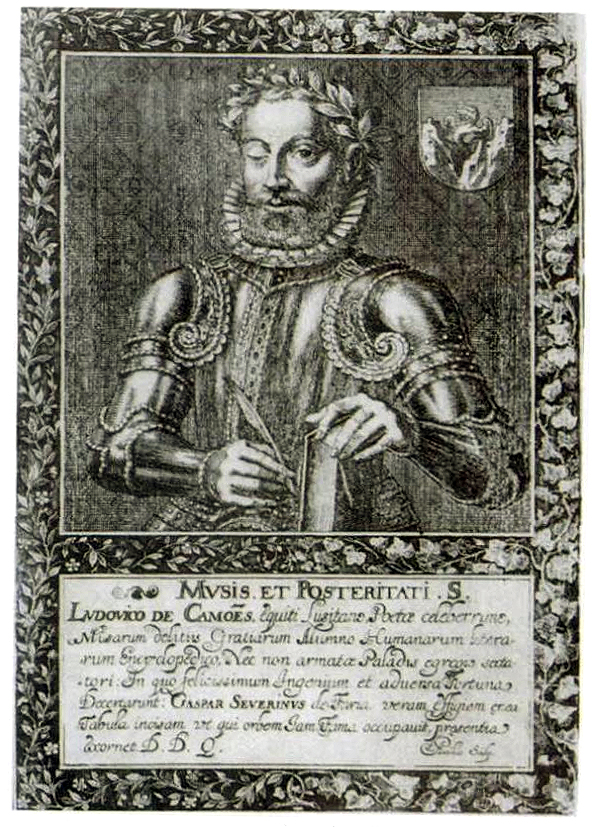
Andries Pauwels: Bust of Camões, 17th century

Camões' production is divided into three genres: lyrical, epic and theatrical. His lyrical work was immediately appreciated as a high achievement. He demonstrated his virtuosity especially in cantos and elegies, but his redondilhas are not far behind. In fact, he was a master in this form, giving new life to the art of gloss, instilling in it spontaneity and simplicity, a delicate irony and a lively phrasing, taking courtesan poetry to its highest level, and showing that he also knew how to express perfectly joy and relaxation. His epic production is synthesized in 'Os Lusíadas', an intense glorification of Portuguese feats, not only of his military victories, but also the conquest over elements and physical space, with recurring use of classic allegories. The idea of a national epic had existed in the Portuguese heart since the 15th century, when the navigations started, but it was up to Camões, in the following century, to materialize it. In his dramatic works he sought to fuse nationalist and classic elements.

Had he remained in Portugal as a courtly poet, he might not have developed his poetic style in the same way. His experiences as a soldier and navigator expanded his perspective and influenced his writing. Through these experiences, he moved away from the formal conventions of courtly poetry. The hardship, exile, and longing for his country influenced his work and subsequently affected later generations of Portuguese writers. His poetry is notable for its depiction of suffering and personal expression, which are central features of his literary legacy.

Its sources were numerous. He dominated Latin and Spanish, and demonstrated a solid knowledge of Greco-Roman mythology, ancient and modern European history, Portuguese chroniclers and classical literature, with authors such as Ovid, Xenophon, Lucan, Valerius Flaccus, Horace standing out, but especially Homer and Virgil, from whom he borrowed various structural and stylistic elements and sometimes even passages in almost literal transcription. According to his quotations, he also seems to have had a good knowledge of works by Ptolemy, Diogenes Laërtius, Pliny the Elder, Strabo and Pomponius Mela, among other historians and ancient scientists. Among the moderns, he was aware of the Italian production of Francesco Petrarca, Ludovico Ariosto, Torquato Tasso, Giovanni Boccaccio and Jacopo Sannazaro, and of Castilian literature.

For those who consider the Renaissance to be a homogeneous historical period, informed by classical ideals and extending to the end of the 16th century, Camões is quite simply a Renaissance poet, but in general it is recognized that the 16th century was largely dominated by a stylistic derivation called Mannerism, which at various points is an anti-classical school and in many ways prefigures the Baroque. Thus, for many authors, it is more appropriate to describe the Camonian style as mannerist, distinguishing it from typical Renaissance classicism. This is justified by the presence of several language resources and an approach to its themes that are not in agreement with the doctrines of balance, economy, tranquility, harmony, unity and invariable idealism, which are the fundamental axes of Renaissance classicism. Camões, after a typically classic initial phase, moved on to other paths and anxiety and drama became his companions. Throughout The Lusiads the signs of a political and spiritual crisis are visible, the prospect of the decline of the empire and the character of the Portuguese remains in the air, censored by bad customs and the lack of appreciation for the arts, alternating with excerpts in which its enthusiastic apology. They are also typical of Mannerism, and would become even more Baroque, the taste for contrast, for emotional flare, for conflict, for paradox, for religious propaganda, for the use of complex figures of speech and preciousness, even for the grotesque and monstrous, many of them common features in Camonian work.

The mannerist nature of his work is also marked by the ambiguities generated by the rupture with the past and by the concomitant adherence to it, the first manifested in the visualization of a new era and in the use of new poetic formulas from Italy, and the second, in the use of archaisms typical of the Middle Ages. Along with the use of formal Renaissance and classicist models, he cultivated the medieval genres of vilancete, cantiga and trova. For Joaquim dos Santos, the contradictory character of his poetry is found in the contrast between two opposing premises: idealism and practical experience. He combined typical values of humanist rationalism with other derivatives of cavalry, crusades and feudalism, aligned the constant propaganda of the Catholic faith with ancient mythology, responsible in the aesthetic plan for all the action that materializes the final realization, discarding the mediocre aurea dear to classics to advocate the primacy of the exercise of weapons and the glorious conquest.

=== Os Lusíadas ===
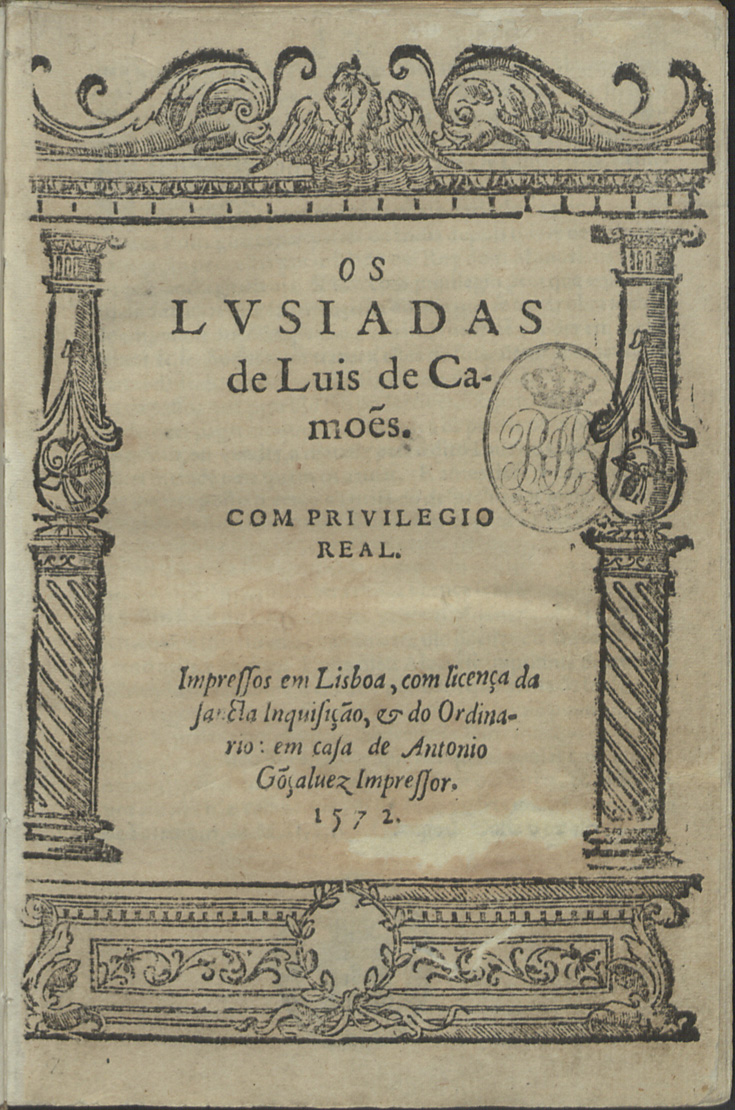
Cover of the 1572 edition of Os Lusíadas

Os Lusíadas, or The Lusiads is considered the Portuguese epic par excellence. The title itself already suggests its nationalist intentions, being derived from the ancient Roman denomination of Portugal, Lusitania. It is one of the most important epics of the modern age due to its greatness and universality. The epic tells the story of Vasco da Gama and the Portuguese heroes who sailed around the Cape of Good Hope and opened a new route to India. It is a humanist epic, even in its contradictions, in the association of pagan mythology with the Christian view, in the opposite feelings about war and empire, in the taste of rest and in the desire for adventure, in the appreciation of sensual pleasure and in the demands of an ethical life, in the perception of greatness and in the presentiment of decline, in the heroism paid for with suffering and struggle. The poem opens with the famous verses:

"As armas e os barões assinalados
Que, da Ocidental praia Lusitana,
Por mares nunca de antes navegados
Passaram ainda além da Taprobana,
Em perigos e guerras esforçados,
Mais do que prometia a força humana,
E entre gente remota edificaram
Novo Reino, que tanto sublimaram;
.....
Cantando espalharei por toda a parte,
Se a tanto me ajudar o engenho e arte."

— Camões: Os Lusíadas, Canto I
Translation:

"The feats of Arms, and famed heroick Host,
from occidental Lusitanian strand,
who o'er the waters ne'er by seaman crost,
farèd beyond the Taprobáne-land,
forceful in perils and in battle-post,
with more than promised force of mortal hand;
and in the regions of a distant race
rear'd a new throne so haught in Pride of Place.
.....
My song would sound o'er Earth's extremest part
were mine the genius, mine the Poet's art."

— Translated by Sir Richard Francis Burton

The ten cantos of the poem add up to 1,102 stanzas in a total of 8,816 decyllable verses, using the ottava rima (abababcc). After an introduction, an invocation and a dedication to King Sebastian, the action begins, which merges myths and historical facts. Vasco da Gama, sailing along the coast of Africa, is observed by the assembly of classical gods, who discuss the fate of the expedition, which is protected by Venus and attacked by Bacchus. Resting for a few days in Malindi, at the request of the local king Vasco da Gama narrates all Portuguese history, from its origins to the journey they undertake. The cantos III, IV and V contain some of the best passages of the entire epic: the episode of Inês de Castro, which becomes a symbol of love and death, the Battle of Aljubarrota, the vision of D. Manuel I, the description of St. Elmo's fire, the story of the giant Adamastor. Back on the ship, the poet takes advantage of his free time to tell the story of the Twelve of England, while Bacchus summons the sea gods to destroy the Portuguese fleet. Venus intervenes and ships reach Calicut, India. There, Paulo da Gama receives the king's representatives and explains the meaning of the banners that adorn the flagship. On the return trip the sailors enjoy the island created for them by Venus, rewarding the nymphs with their favors. One of them sings the glorious future of Portugal and the scene ends with a description of the universe by Tethys and Vasco da Gama. Then the journey continues home.

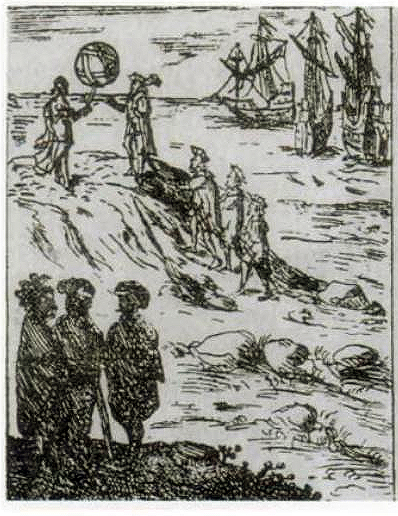
Tethys describes the World Machine to Gama, illustration from the 1639 edition of Faria e Sousa

In Os Lusíadas, Camões strikes a balance between classical scholarship and practical experience, developed with consummate technical skill, describing Portuguese adventures with moments of serious thought mixed with those of delicate sensitivity and humanism. The descriptions of battles, the manifestation of the natural forces, the sensual encounters transcend the allegory and the classicist allusion that permeate all the work and present themselves as a fluent speech and always of a high aesthetic level, not only for its narrative character especially well achieved, but also by the superior mastery of all the resources of the language and the art of versification, with a knowledge of a wide range of styles, used in efficient combination. The work is also a serious warning for Christian kings to abandon small rivalries and unite against Muslim expansion.

The structure of the work is in itself worthy of interest, as, according to Jorge de Sena, nothing is arbitrary in Os Lusíadas. Among the arguments he presented was the use of the golden section, a defined relationship between the parts and the whole, organizing the set in ideal proportions that emphasize especially significant passages. Sena demonstrated that when applying the golden section to the whole work, it falls precisely on the verse that describes the arrival of the Portuguese in India. Applying the separate section to the two resulting parts, in the first part comes the episode that reports the death of Inês de Castro and, in the second, the stanza that narrates Cupid's efforts to unite the Portuguese and the nymphs, which for Sena reinforces the importance of love throughout the composition. Two other elements give Os Lusíadas its modernity and distance it from classicism: the introduction of doubt, contradiction and questioning, in disagreement with the affirmative certainty that characterizes the classic epic, and the primacy of rhetoric over action, replacing the world of facts with that of words, which do not fully recover reality and evolve into metalanguage, with the same disruptive effect on the traditional epic.

According to Costa Pimpão, there is no evidence that Camões intended to write his epic before he traveled to India, although heroic themes were already present in his previous production. It is possible that he drew some inspiration from fragments of the Decades of Asia, by João de Barros, and the History of the Discovery and Conquest of India by the Portuguese, by Fernão Lopes de Castanheda. He was certainly well-informed on classical mythology before that, as well as on ancient epic literature. Apparently, the poem started to take shape as early as 1554, with Storck considering that his determination to write it was born during the sea voyage itself. He was seen working on it in Mozambique by his friend historian Diogo do Couto between 1568 and 1569.

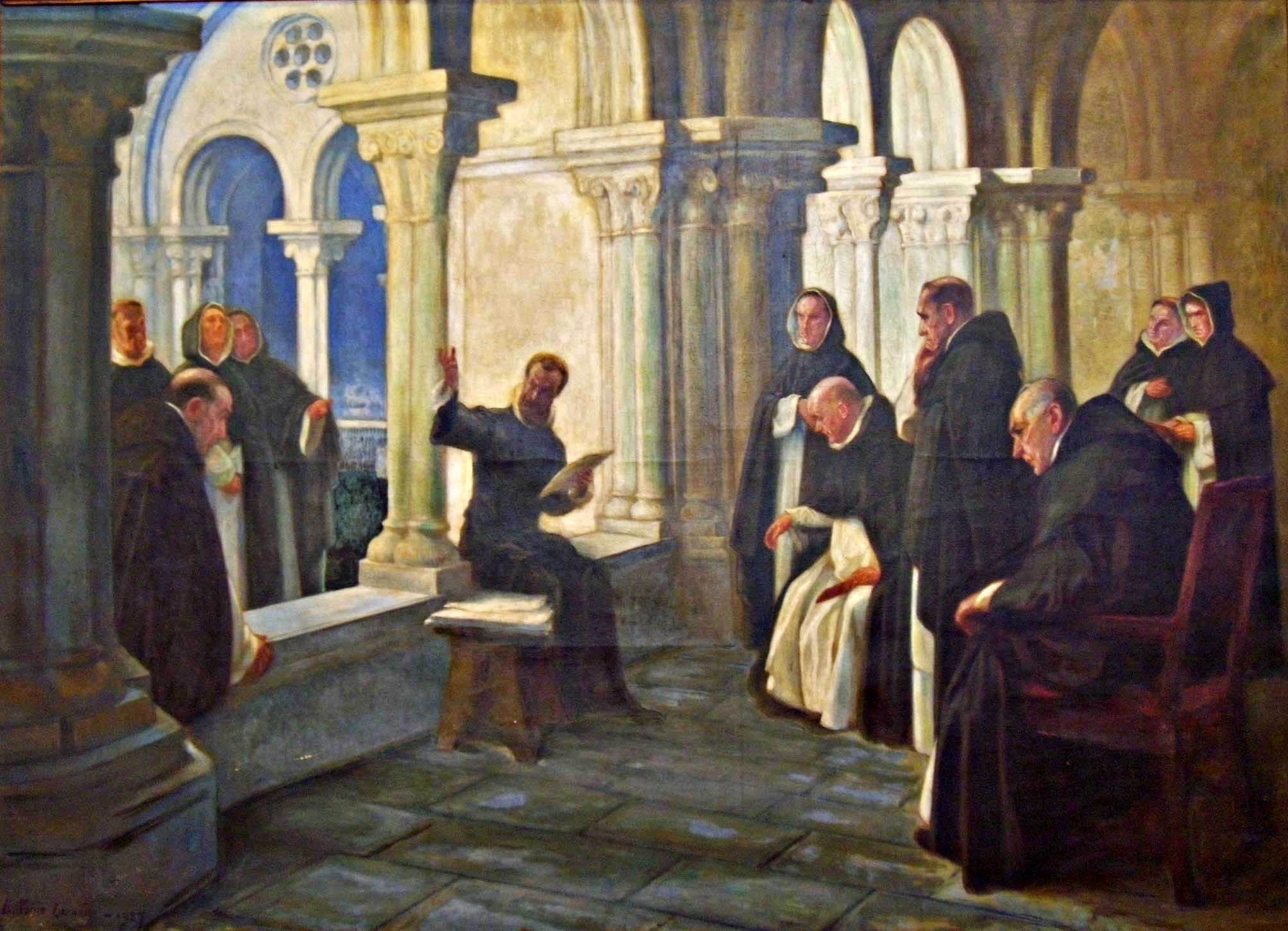
Camões Reading The Lusiads to the Dominican Friars by António Carneiro (1927).

The success of the publication of Os Lusíadas supposedly required a second edition in the same year as the princeps edition. The two differ in countless details and it was debated at length which one would in fact be the original. Nor is it clear to whom the amendments to the second text are due. Currently, the edition that shows the publisher's brand, a pelican, with its neck turned to the left, which is called edition A, carried out under the supervision of the author, is recognized as original. However, edition B was for a long time taken as princeps, with disastrous consequences for the later critical analysis of the work. Apparently, edition B was produced later, around 1584 or 1585, in a clandestine manner, taking the fictitious date of 1572 to bypass the delays of censorship of the time if it were published as a new edition and to correct the serious defects of another 1584 edition, the so-called piscos edition. However, Maria Helena Paiva raised the hypothesis that editions A and B are only variants of the same edition, which was corrected after the typographic composition, but while printing was already in progress. According to the researcher, "the need to make the most of the press led to the conclusion that, after printing a shape, which consisted of several folios, a first test was taken, which was corrected while the press continued, now with the corrected text. There were, therefore, uncorrected printed folios and corrected printed folios, which were grouped indistinctly in the same copy", so that there were no two copies exactly the same in the press system of that time.

=== Rimas ===
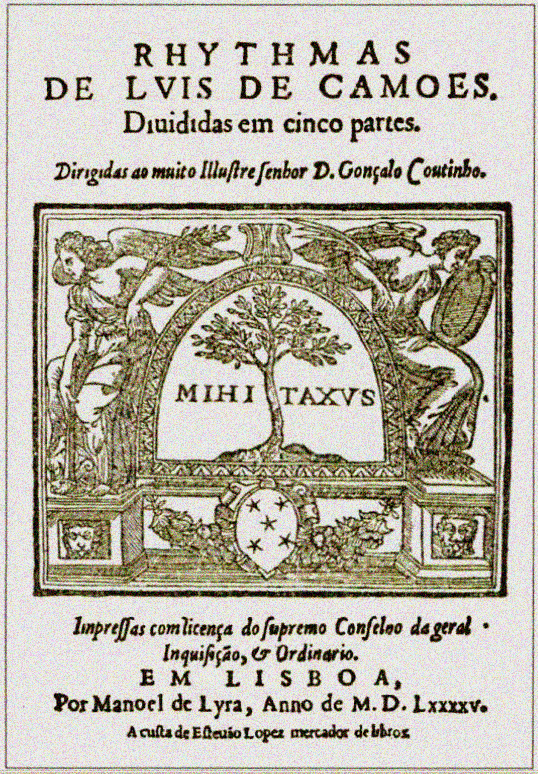
Cover of the first edition of Rimas, 1595

Camões' lyric work, dispersed in manuscripts, was collected and published posthumously in 1595 under the title Rimas (Rhymes). Throughout the 17th century, the growing prestige of his epic contributed to raise the appreciation for these other poems even more. The collection includes redondilhas, odes, glosses, cantigas, twists or variations, sextilhas, sonnets, elegies, eclogues and other small stanzas. His lyrical poetry comes from several different sources: the sonnets generally follow the Italian style derived from Petrarch, the songs took the model of Petrarch and Pietro Bembo. In the odes, the influence of the troubadour poetry of chivalry and classical poetry is verified, but with a more refined style; in the sextilhas the Provençal influence is clear; in the redondilhas it expanded the form, deepened the lyricism and introduced a theme, worked on antitheses and paradoxes, unknown in the old tradition of Cantigas de amigo, and the elegies are quite classicist. Its resorts follow an epistolary style, with moralizing themes. Eclogues are perfect pieces of the pastoral genre, derived from Virgil and the Italians. The influence of Spanish poetry by Garcilaso de la Vega, Jorge de Montemor, Juan Boscán, Gregorio Silvestre and several other names was also detected in many points of his lyric, as his commentator Faria e Sousa pointed out.

Despite the care of the first editor of Rimas, Fernão Rodrigues Lobo Soropita, in the 1595 edition, several apocryphal poems were included. Many poems were discovered over the next few centuries and attributed to him, but not always with careful critical analysis. The result was that, for example, while in the original Rhymes there were 65 sonnets, in the 1861 edition of Juromenha there were 352; in the 1953 edition of Aguiar e Silva 166 pieces were still listed. In addition, many editions modernized or "embellished" the original text, a practice that was particularly pronounced after the 1685 edition of Faria e Sousa, giving rise to and rooting a tradition of its own in this adulterated lesson that caused enormous difficulties for critical study. More scientific studies only began to be undertaken at the end of the 19th century, with the contribution of Wilhelm Storck and Carolina Michaëlis de Vasconcelos, who discarded several apocryphal compositions. At the beginning of the 20th century, work continued with José Maria Rodrigues and Afonso Lopes Vieira, who published Rimas in 1932 in an edition they called "crítica" ("criticism"), although it did not deserve the name: it adopted large parts of Faria and Sousa's lesson, but editors claimed to have used the original editions, from 1595 and 1598. On the other hand, they definitely raised the issue of textual fraud that had been perpetuating for a long time and had tampered with the poems to the point of becoming unrecognizable. One example is enough:

- 1595 edition: "Aqui, ó Ninfas minhas, vos pintei / Todo de amores um jardim suave; / Das aves, pedras, águas vos contei, / Sem me ficar bonina, fera ou ave."
- 1685 edition: "Aqui, fremosas ninfas, vos pintei / Todo de amores um jardim suave; / De águas, de pedras, de árvores contei, / De flores, de almas, feras, de uma, outra ave."

It seems impossible to reach a definitive result in this purge. However, enough authentic material survives to guarantee his position as the best Portuguese lyricist and the greatest Renaissance poet in Portugal.

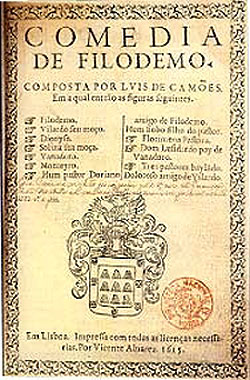
Cover of the 1615 edition of Filodemo

=== Comedies ===
The general content of his works for the stage combines, in the same way as in Os Lusíadas, nationalism and classic inspiration. His production in this field is limited to three works, all in the genre of comedy and in the format of self: El-Rei Seleuco, Filodemo and Anfitriões. The attribution of El-Rei Seleuco to Camões, however, is controversial. Its existence was not known until 1654, when it appeared published in the first part of Rimas in the Craesbeeck edition, which gave no details about its origin and had little care in editing the text. The play also differs in several aspects from the other two that survived, such as its much shorter length (an act), the existence of a prologue in prose, and the less profound and less erudite treatment of the love theme. The theme, of the complicated passion of Antiochus, son of King Seleucus I Nicator, for his stepmother, Queen Estratonice, was taken from a historical fact from Antiquity transmitted by Plutarch and repeated by Petrarch and the Spanish popular songwriter, working it in the style by Gil Vicente.

Anfitriões, published in 1587, is an adaptation of Plautus' Amphitryon, where it emphasizes the comic character of the Amphitryon myth, highlighting the omnipotence of love, which subdues even the immortals, also following the Vincentian tradition. The play was written in smaller redondilhas and uses bilingualism, using Castilian in the lines of the character Sósia, a slave, to mark his low social level in passages that reach the grotesque, a feature that appears in the other pieces as well. Filodemo, composed in India and dedicated to the viceroy D. Francisco Barreto, is a comedy of morality in five acts, according to the classical division, being, of the three, the one that remained most alive in the interest of the critic due to the multiplicity of human experiences it describes and for the sharpness of psychological observation. The theme is about the love of a servant, Filodemo, for the daughter, Dionisa, of the nobleman in the house of the one he serves, with autobiographical traits. Camões saw comedy as a secondary genre, of interest only as a diversion of circumstance, but he achieved significant results by transferring the comicality of the characters to the action and refining the plot, so he pointed out a path for the renewal of Portuguese comedy. However, his suggestion was not followed by the growers of the genus who succeeded him.

== Expansion of fame beyond Portugal ==
TO MY MASTER CAMOENS:
(Tu se' lo mio maestro, e' l mio autore)
Great Pilgrim-poet of the Sea and Land;
Thou life-long sport of Fortune's ficklest will;
Despite thy lover-heart, thy hero-hand:
Enrollèd by thy pen what marv'ellous band
Of god-like Forms thy golden pages fill;
Love, Honour, Justice, Valour, Glory thrill
The Soul, obedient to thy strong command:
Amid the Prophets highest sits the Bard,
At once Revealer of the Heav'en and Earth,
To Heav'en the guide, of Earth the noblest guard;
And, 'mid the Poets thine the peerless worth,
Whose glorious song, thy Genius' sole reward,
Bids all the Ages, Camoens! bless thy birth.

—Richard Francis Burton, 1880.

According to Monteiro, of the great epic poets of the west, Camões remains the least known outside his homeland and his masterpiece, Os Lusíadas, is the least known of the great poems in the style. However, from the time he lived and throughout the centuries after Camões was praised by several non-Lusophone luminaries of Western culture. Torquato Tasso, who claimed that Camões was the only rival he feared, dedicated a sonnet to him, Baltasar Gracián praised his sharpness and ingenuity, as did Lope de Vega. Cervantes – stated that he saw Camões as the "singer of Western civilization". He was an influence on the work of John Milton and several other English poets, Goethe recognized his eminence, Sir Richard Burton considered him a master, Friedrich Schlegel called him the ultimate exponent of creation in epic poetry, opining that the "perfection" [Vollendung] of Portuguese poetry was evident in his "beautiful poems", Humboldt regarded him as an admirable painter of nature. August-Wilhelm Schlegel wrote that Camões, by itself, is worth entire literary works.

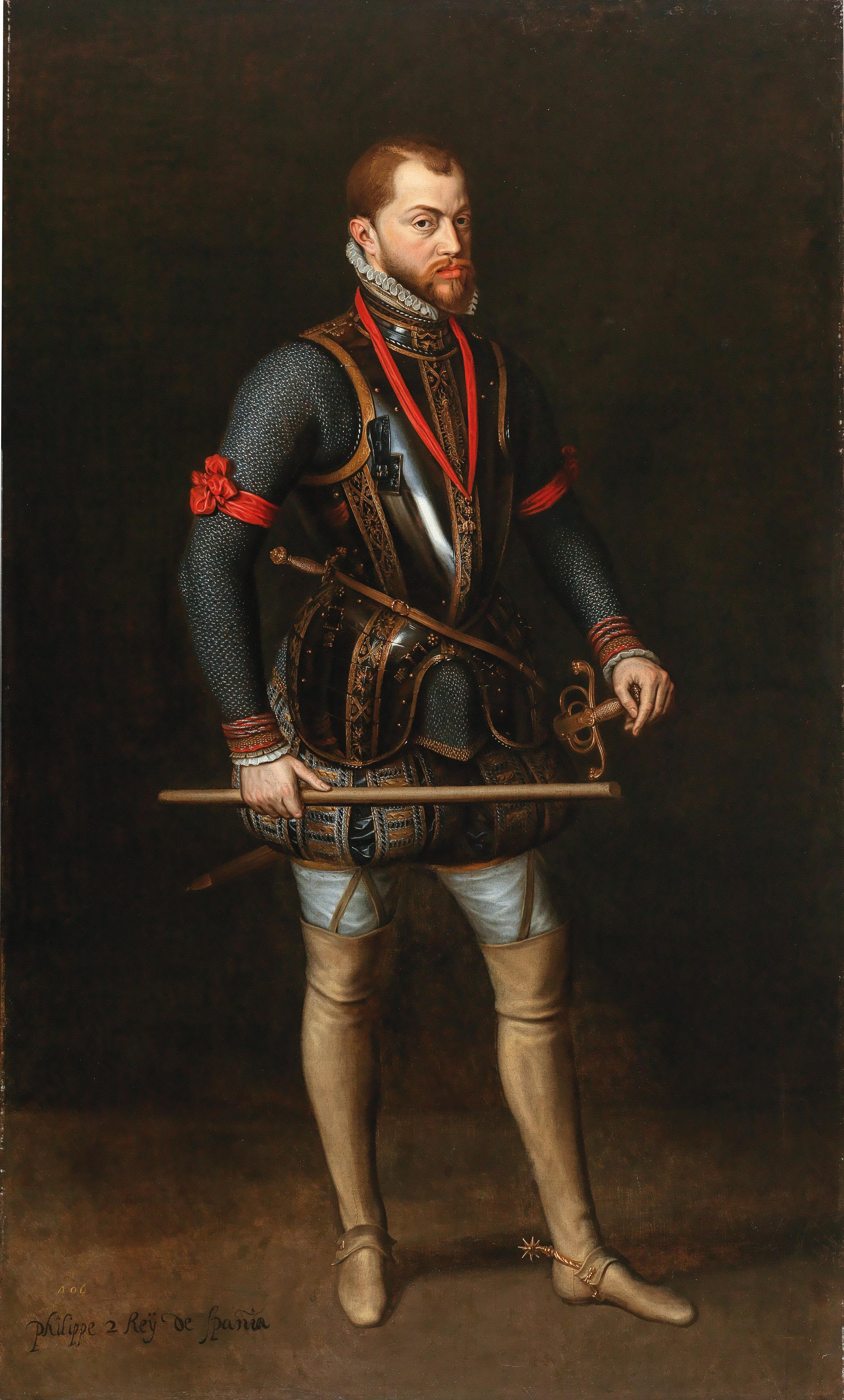
Philip II of Spain

Camões' fame began to spread across Spain, where he had several admirers since the 16th century, with two translations of Os Lusíadas appearing in 1580, the year of the poet's death, possibly printed at the behest of Philip II of Spain, who at the time was also the king of Portugal. In Luis Gómez de Tápia's edition, Camões is already mentioned as "famous", and in Benito Caldera's he was compared to Virgil. In addition, the king granted him the honorific title of "Prince of the Poets of Spain", which was printed in one of the translations. Philip was perfectly aware of the advantages of using an already established culture for his own purposes rather than suppressing it. As the son of a Portuguese princess, he had no interest in annulling the Portuguese identity or its cultural achievements, and it was to his advantage to assimilate the poet into the Spanish orbit, both to ensure his legitimacy as sovereign of the united crowns, and to enhance the brilliance of Spanish culture.

Soon his fame would reach Italy; Tasso called his work "cult and good" and by 1658 Os Lusíadas would be translated twice, by Oliveira and Paggi. Later, associated with Tasso, it became an important paradigm in Italian Romanticism. By this time in Portugal, a body of exegetes and commentators had already been formed, giving the study of Camões great depth. In 1655 Os Lusíadas arrived in England in Fanshawe's translation, but would only gain notoriety there about a century later, with the publication of William Julius Mickle's poetic version in 1776, which, although successful, did not prevent the emergence of another dozen English translations until the end of the 19th century. It arrived in France at the beginning of the 18th century, when Castera published a translation of the epic. Voltaire criticized certain aspects of the work, namely its lack of unity in action and the mixture of Christian and pagan mythology, but he also admired the novelties it introduced in relation to other epics, contributing powerfully to its popularity. Montesquieu stated that Camões' poem had something of the charm of the Odyssey and the magnificence of the Aeneid. Between 1735 and 1874 no less than twenty French translations of the book appeared, not counting numerous second editions and paraphrases of some of the most striking episodes. In 1777 Pieterszoon translated Os Lusíadas into Dutch and by the 19th century, five more partial translations had appeared.

== Bibliography ==
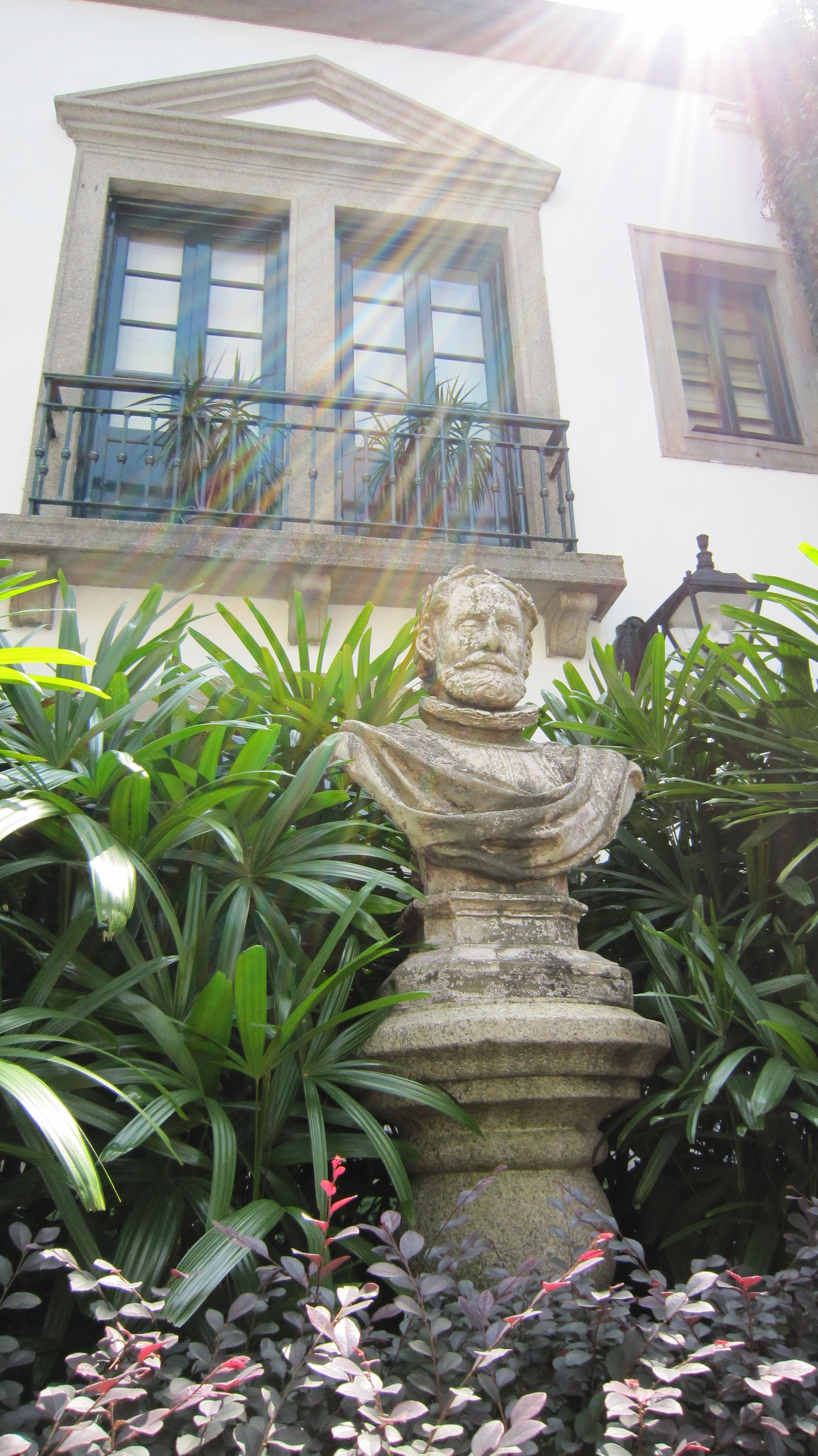
Luís de Camões Statue in the Edifício do Instituto para os Assuntos Municipais (Leal Senado) in Macau, China

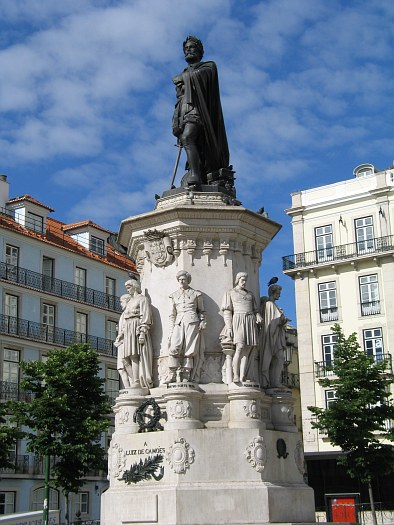
Monument to Luís de Camões, Lisbon

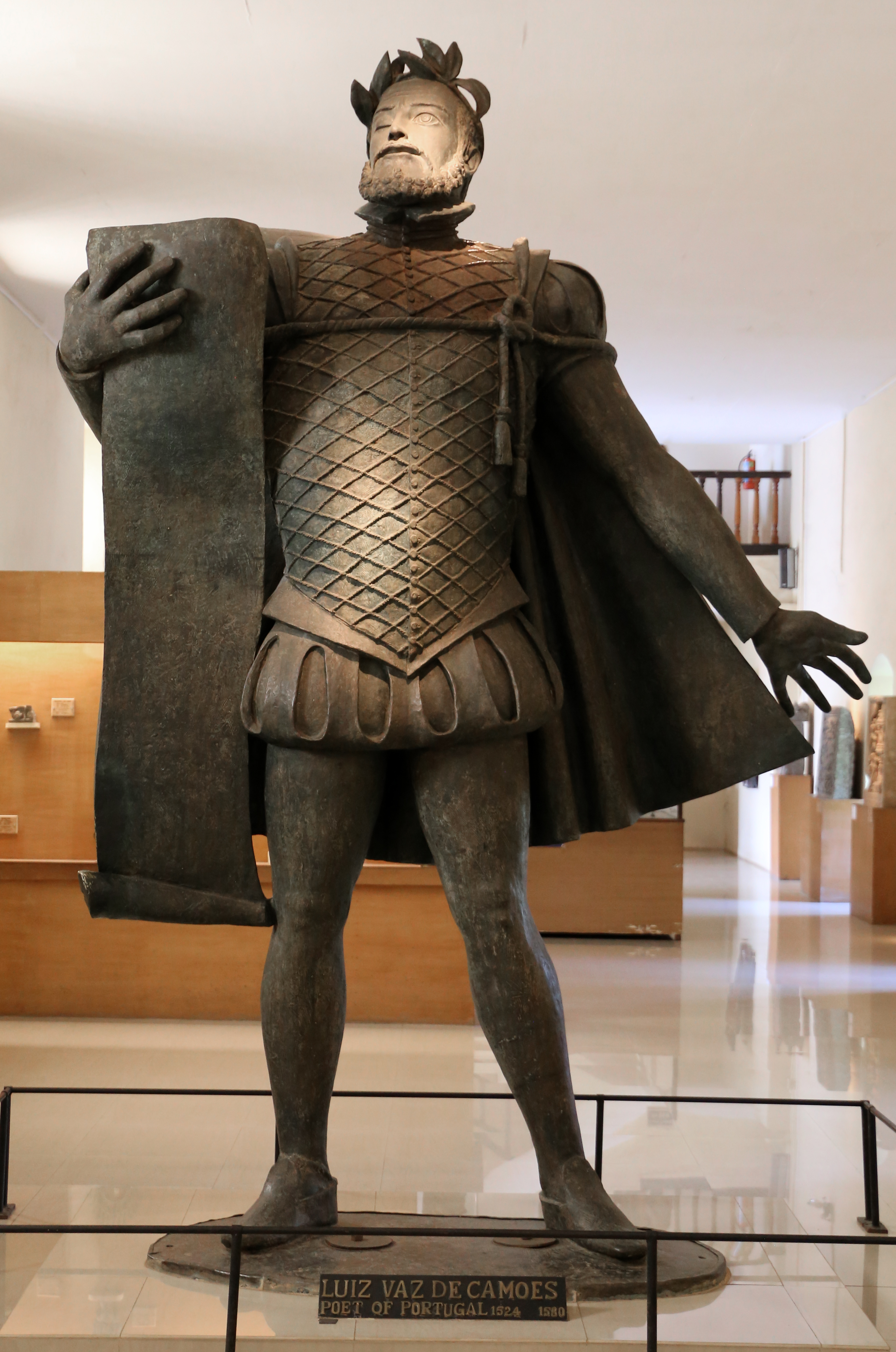
Luís de Camões Statue in the Archaeological Museum of Old Goa, India

Works by Camões

- The Lusiads
- The Parnasum of Luís Vaz (lost)
- Lyric Poems
- Auto dos Anfitriões
- Auto El-rei Seleuco
- Disparates da Índia
- Auto do Filodemo
- Letters

English translations

- The Lusiadas of Luiz de Camões. Leonard Bacon. 1950.
- Luis de Camões: Epic and Lyric. Keith Bosley. Carcanet, 1990.
- The Lusiads. Trans. Landeg White. Oxford: Oxford UP, 2002. ISBN 0-19-280151-1.
- Luis de Camões, Selected Sonnets: A Bilingual Edition. Ed. and trans. William Baer. Chicago: U of Chicago P, 2005. ISBN 978-0-226-09266-9. (Paperback publ. 2008, ISBN 978-0-226-09286-7)
- The Collected Lyric Poems of Luís de Camões Trans. Landeg White. Princeton: Princeton UP, 2008. ISBN

Biography and textual study in English

- Life of Camões. John Adamson. Longman, 1820.
- Camoens: His Life and his Lusiads: A Commentary. Richard Francis Burton. 2 vols. London: Quaritch, 1881.
- The Place of Camoens in Literature. Joaquim Nabuco. Washington, D.C. [?], 1908.
- Luis de Camões. Aubrey F.G. Bell. London: 1923.
- Camoens, Central Figure of Portuguese Literature. Isaac Goldberg. Girard: Haldeman-Julius, 1924.
- From Virgil to Milton. Cecil M. Bowra. 1945.
- Camoens and the Epic of the Lusiads. Henry Hersch Hart. 1962.
- The Presence of Camões: Influences on the Literature of England, America & Southern Africa. George Monteiro. Lexington: University of Kentucky Press, 1996. ISBN 0-8131-1952-9.
- Ordering Empire: The Poetry of Camões, Pringle and Campbell. Nicholas Meihuizen. Bern: Peter Lang, 2007. ISBN 978-3-03911-023-0.
- "Camões, Prince of Poets". Clive Willis, HiPLAM, University of Bristol, 2010. ISBN 978-0-9552406-6-9
- "Camões and the Glory of Portugal." Leonard Bacon. In Five Gayley Lectures, 1947-1954, edited by L. B. Bennion and G. R. Potter. University of California Press, 1954.

Biography and textual study in Spanish

- Camoens y Cervantes / Orico, Osvaldo., 1948
- Camoens / Filgueira Valverde, Jose., 1958
- Homenaje a Camoens: Estudios y Ensayos., 1980
- Cuatro Lecciones Sobre Camoens / Alonso Zamora Vicente., 1981

== In culture ==
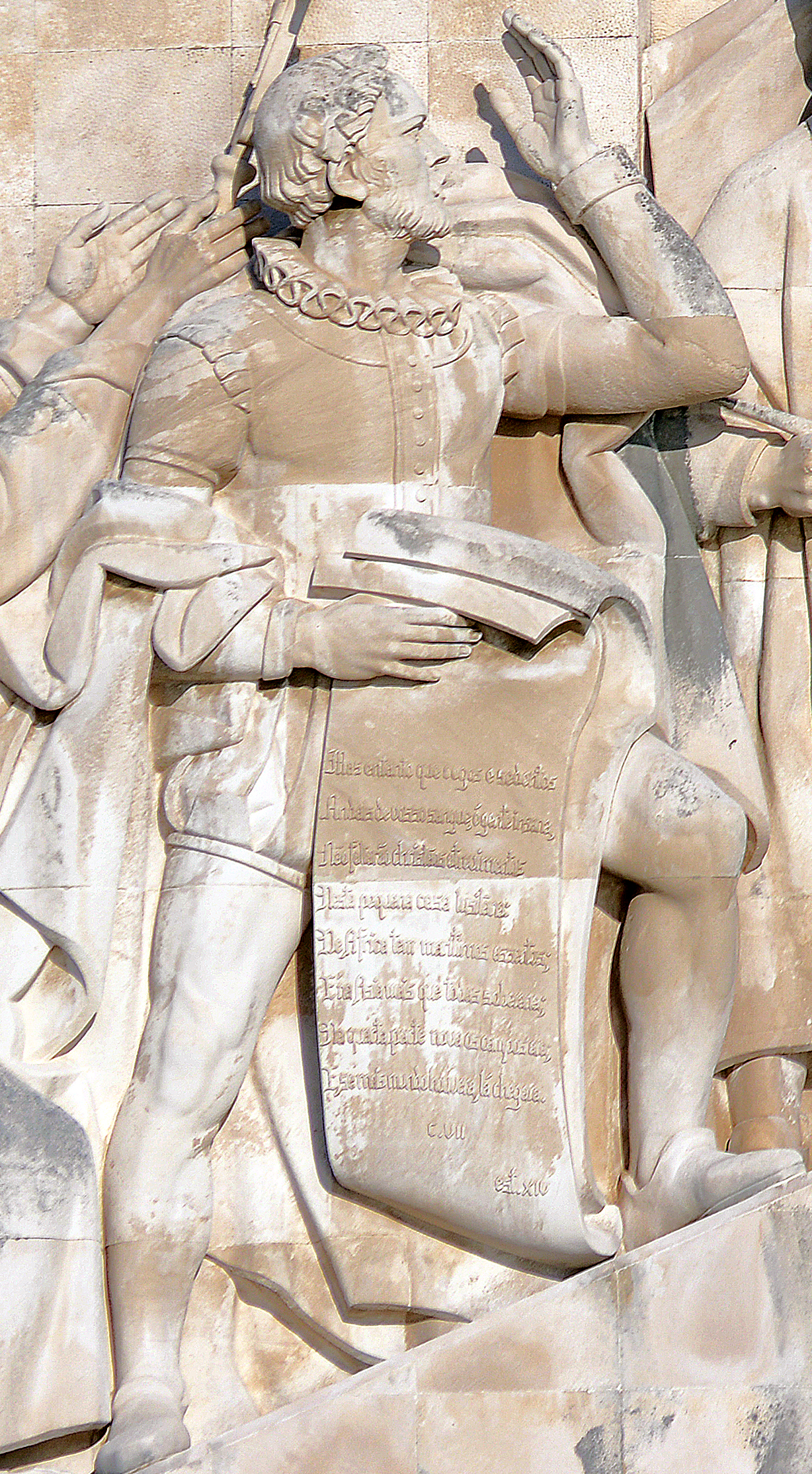
Effigy of Luís de Camões on the Monument to the Discoveries, in Lisbon, Portugal.

- Camões is the subject of the first romantic painting from a Portuguese painter, A Morte de Camões (1825), by Domingos Sequeira, now lost.
- His death in poverty and obscurity is the subject of Letitia Elizabeth Landon's poem The Death of Camoens. This is one of Landon's Subjects for Pictures, in The New Monthly Magazine, 1838.
- He is one of the characters in Gaetano Donizetti's grand opera Dom Sébastien, Roi de Portugal.
- Camões figures prominently in the book Het verboden rijk (The Forbidden Empire) by the Dutch writer J. Slauerhoff, who himself made several voyages to the Far East as a ship's doctor.
- A museum dedicated to Camões can be found in Macau, the Museu Luís de Camões.
- In Goa (India) the Archeological Museum at Old Goa (which used to be a Franciscan monastery) houses a 3 meters high bronze statue of Luís de Camões. The statue was originally installed in the garden in year 1960 but was moved into the museum due to public protest after Goa's annexation to India. Another Camões monument in Goa, India – "Jardim de Garcia da Orta Garden" (popularly known as Panaji Municipal Garden) has a 12 meter high pillar in the center.
- A seamount in the Indian Ocean is named after him.
- Institute Menezes Braganza in Panaji, Goa has grand Azulejos adorning its walls. These ceramics depict scenes from Os Lusíadas.
- David Anderson, Nuno Cristo, Aida Jordão, Mark Keetch and Larry Lewis created a puppet play about Camões called Camoes, the One-Eyed Poet of Portugal that premiere in Toronto in 2006.

== See also ==
- Portugal Day
