= Abate Pico della Mirandola =

Italian noble and politician

Alessandro Pico della Mirandola
- Marquis of Quarantoli and Concordia
- Coat of arms
- Other titles: Abbot of San José de Benavides
- Born: 1705; Bologna
- Died: 1787 (aged 81–82); Madrid
- Buried: 1787; Convent of Copacabana
- Noble family: Pico della Mirandola
- Spouse: Margherita Eleonora Pio di Savoia y Spinola (m. 1748)
- Father: Giovanni Pico della Mirandola
- Mother: Isabella Caterina Barbieri

Alessandro Pico della Mirandola (1705, in Bologna – 1787, in Madrid), known under the pseudonym Abate Pico della Mirandola, was an Italian nobleman and politician, and the last male descendant of the Pico della Mirandola lineage.

He lived almost all his life in exile in Madrid, and was highly esteemed for his talents; although he was not a priest, he always wore the cassock, calling himself Abate ('abbot').

== Life ==
Alessandro Pico della Mirandola was the legitimised natural son of Giovanni Pico della Mirandola, Marquis of Quarantoli (in turn son of Alessandro II Pico della Mirandola), and Isabella Caterina Barbieri. He was baptised in Bologna Cathedral on 21 February 1705. Following the defeat in the siege of Mirandola in the spring of 1705, the Pico family, accused of felony, was expelled from the Duchy of Mirandola, which was sold to Rinaldo I d'Este, Duke of Modena. Emperor Joseph awarded him a pension of 25 doubles as alimony together with his uncles Galeotto, Maria Isabella and Maria Celeste.

After graduating from the University of Siena after six years of studies, his uncle Cardinal Lodovico Pico della Mirandola paved the way for his ecclesiastical career, obtaining on 20 August 1739 from Pope Clement XII the bull of dispensation from illegitimacy, which allowed him to be ordained and to have access to ecclesiastical benefits; however, he simply remained tonsured, wearing the cassock and being called abbot. He later moved to Spain, following his cousin Francesco Maria II Pico della Mirandola, and resided in Madrid at the Spanish Court for the rest of his life, where he held various offices and obtained various prebands and honours, including the archdeaconry of Cordoba, which he was given on 25 October 1743.

On 3 November 1744, he was appointed Courtier of the King of Spain, with the mission of accompanying the infanta María Teresa Rafaela, together with the Duchess of Mirandola, to the French border.

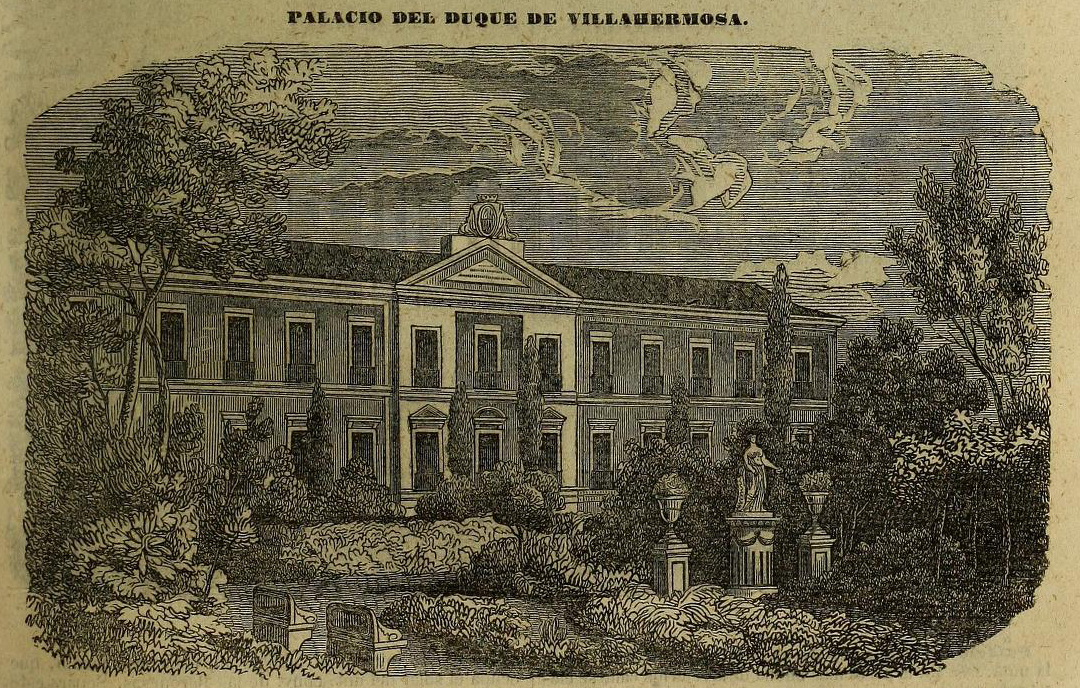
Engraved view of the Palace of Villahermosa, Madrid (1850)

After the death of Francesco Maria Pico della Mirandola (26 November 1747), having remained the last male descendant of the Pico della Mirandola family, he secretly married in 1748 Margherita Eleonora Pio di Savoia y Spinola (1720–1796), daughter of Francisco Pío de Saboya y Moura, Prince of San Gregorio, Duke of Nochera and Marquis of Castel Rodrigo, and of Giovanna Spinola y La Cerda, of the Dukes of the Sesto; no children were born of the marriage. The couple commissioned the architect Francisco Sánchez to build the palace of Villahermosa (now housing the Thyssen-Bornemisza Museum), whose façade reflected the complex personality of the Abbot Pico, with a mixture of Italian, French and Spanish architectural elements and an elegance unusual for Madrid at the time. The building was sold on 18 October 1771 to Juan Pablo de Aragón-Azlor, Duke of Villahermosa for the sum of 2,220,544.11 reales.

At the court of King Ferdinand VI of Spain, he distinguished himself as a man of refined artistic taste, possessor of a collection of paintings and playwright. His opera Il vellocino d'oro (translated into Spanish as El vellón de oro) was first performed at the Buen Retiro Palace in 1749 with music by Giovanni Battista Mele, and was rewarded with 13,000 reales, as well as a gold case decorated with brilliants and two barrels of tobacco; the serenade Le Mode (in Spanish Las Modas) was performed in 1754, with music by Nicola Conforto, at the Royal Palace of Aranjuez and was rewarded with a ring adorned with a round brilliant. Giacomo Casanova remembered him in his memoirs as a 'most worthy man of spirit and venerable in age' during a visit he made to Madrid in 1768. He was a close friend of Marquis Jerónimo Grimaldi, 1st Duke of Grimaldi.

In 1754 King Ferdinand VI appointed him Minister of the Treasury Council. His successor King Charles III of Spain confirmed him as a member of the Chamber of Single Taxes of the Treasury Council (4 July 1770) and made him a retired knight of the Order of Charles III (28 December 1772). He was spiritual director of the church-hospital in Madrid, for which he opposed the interference of the Apostolic Nuncio.

He died in Madrid in 1787, at the age of 82, and was buried in the Grand Convent of the Augustinian Recollects (also known as the Copacabana Convent), which was destroyed in the 19th century. In his will of 1787 he established some schools in Madrid; some Opere Pie were also founded in Sicily.

== See also ==
- Duchy of Mirandola

== Bibliography ==
- Antonio José Díaz-Rodríguez (2013). Alejandro Pico de la Mirarla (in Spanish). Vol. XLI. Madrid: Real Academia de la Historia. p. 507.
- Pompeo Litta (1835). Famiglie celebri di Italia. Pico della Mirandola. [ISBN unspecified].
- Miroslav Marek. "Pico 2".
- Memorie storiche della città e dell'antico ducato della Mirandola. Vol. 4. 1877.
