= Francesco Maria Pico della Mirandola =

Italian nobleman

- Duke of Mirandola
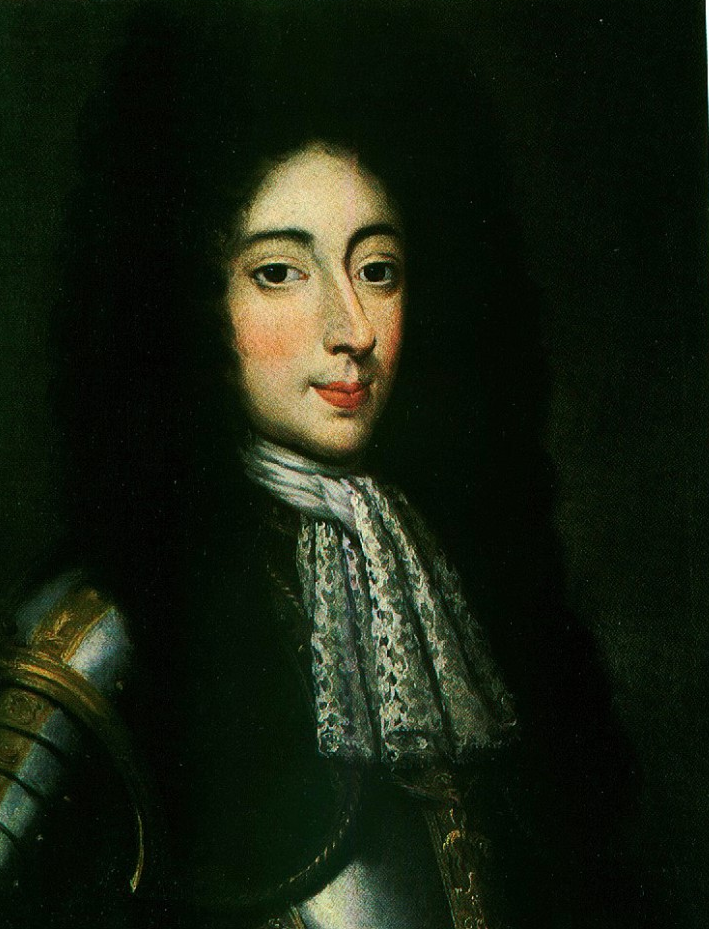

- Coat of arms
- Predecessor: Alessandro II Pico della Mirandola
- Other titles: Marquis of Concordia
- Born: 30 September 1688; Concordia sulla Secchia
- Died: 26 November 1747 (aged 59); Madrid
- Buried: 1747
- Noble family: Pico della Mirandola
- Spouses: María Teresa Spínola y de la Cerda (m. 1723; died 1723) Maria Guadalupe Fitz-James Stuart y Colón de Portugal (m. 1744)
- Father: Francesco Maria I Pico della Mirandola
- Mother: Anna Camilla Borghese

Francesco Maria Pico (Concordia sulla Secchia, 30 September 1688 – Madrid, 26 November 1747), also known as Francesco Maria II Pico della Mirandola to distinguish him from his father, was an Italian nobleman, third Duke of Mirandola and fourth Marquis of Concordia.

Nicknamed 'il Duchino', because he became sovereign at the age of just over 2 years, he was the last member of the Pico family to reign over the Duchy of Mirandola, which with him put an end to its independence: in fact, the sovereign was deposed in 1708 following the War of the Spanish Succession and in 1710 the Duchy was sold to Rinaldo d'Este and annexed to the Duchy of Modena and Reggio.

Since both of his marriages turned out to be childless, the direct line of the Pico della Mirandola rulers became extinct with him.

== Life ==
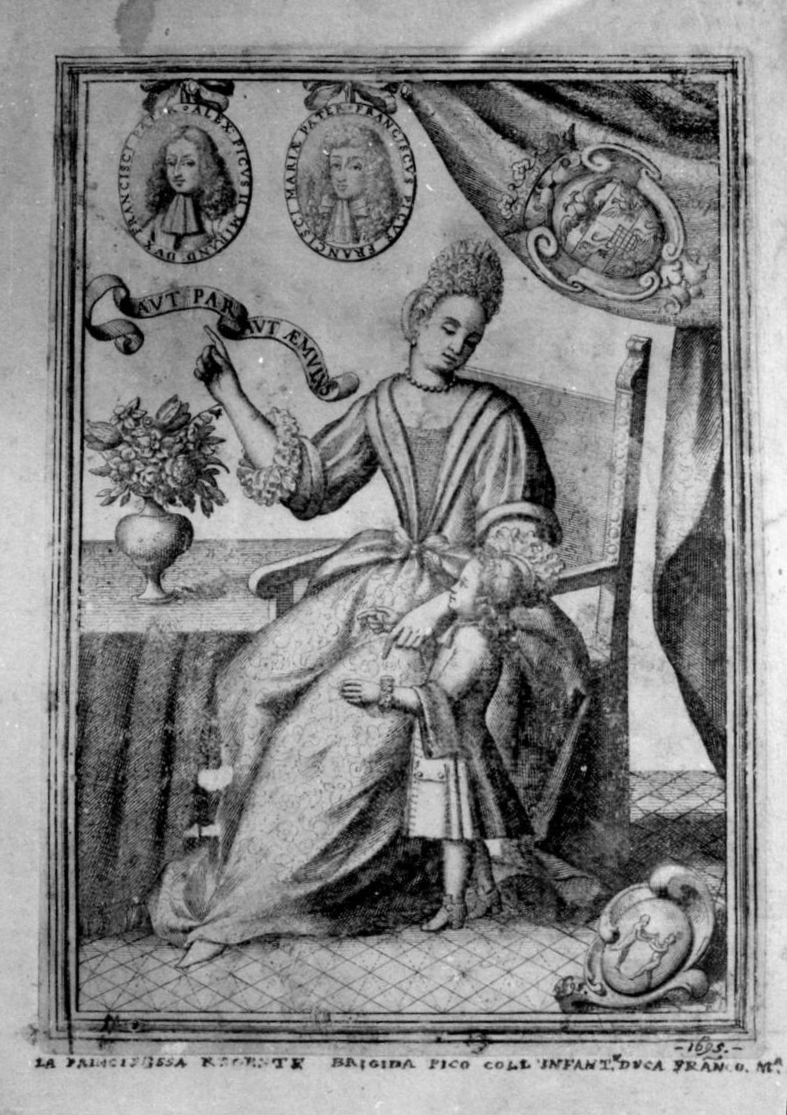
Princess Regent Brigida Pico shows the infant Duke Francesco Maria the portraits of his father Francesco and grandfather Alessandro II.

Born in Concordia, he was the son of Francesco Maria I Pico (who died on 19 April 1689 at just 27 years of age) and Anna Camilla Borghese, Princess of Cellamare and daughter of Giovanni Battista Borghese, Prince of Sulmona. Shortly afterwards, Francesco Maria was also abandoned by his mother, after bitter disagreements with the Pico family.

When his grandfather Alessandro II Pico della Mirandola died on 2 February 1691, he received the fiefdom, which he governed under the guardianship of his aunt Brigida Pico (1633–1720). His rule began in 1706 and he sided with France in the War of the Spanish Succession: Concordia was set on fire and devastated. During the siege of Mirandola in 1705, he signed a treaty with the King of France in Modena, at the same time being appointed lieutenant general and Mirandola placed under a French garrison. As a consequence of this, in 1706 in Vienna he was declared forfeit for felony against the Holy Roman Empire and expelled from the Duchy of Mirandola by Prince Eugene of Savoy. In 1708 all the Pico family's property was confiscated. In 1710, the Duchy of Mirandola was sold to Rinaldo d'Este, Duke of Modena for the sum of 200,000 Spanish doubles (equivalent to a tonne of gold).

Francesco Maria found refuge in Spain, with his cousin Alessandro (known as Abbot Pico), under the protection of King Philip V, who appointed him Caballerizo mayor in May 1715, and Mayordomo mayor del Rey de España in 1738.

On 14 June 1716, he married Duchess María Teresa Spínola y de la Cerda, daughter of Duke Carlos Felipe Antonio Spinola (fourth Duke of Sextus and Marquis of Los Balbases as well as Grande de España), who drowned on 15 September 1723 during a flood that swept through their house in Madrid; Francesco Pio di Savoia (Francisco Pío de Saboya y Moura) also died in the tragedy. In 1744 he married in second marriage Maria Guadalupe Fitz-James Stuart y Colón de Portugal (1725-1750), daughter of James Fitz-James Stuart, 2nd Duke of Berwick and Catalina Ventura Colón de Portugal, 8th Duchess of Veragua.

He died in Madrid in 1747, without sons.

== Bibliography ==
- Cecilia Cotti (2005). El Duque de la Mirandola: Francesco Maria Pico alla corte di Madrid (1715–1747). Mirandola: Centro Internazionale di cultura "Giovanni Pico della Mirandola.
- Pompeo Litta (1835). Famiglie celebri di Italia. Pico della Mirandola. [ISBN unspecified].

== See also ==
- Duchy of Mirandola
- Brigida Pico
- Mirandola Mint
