= Saint Matthew and the Angel (Guercino) =

Painting by Guercino

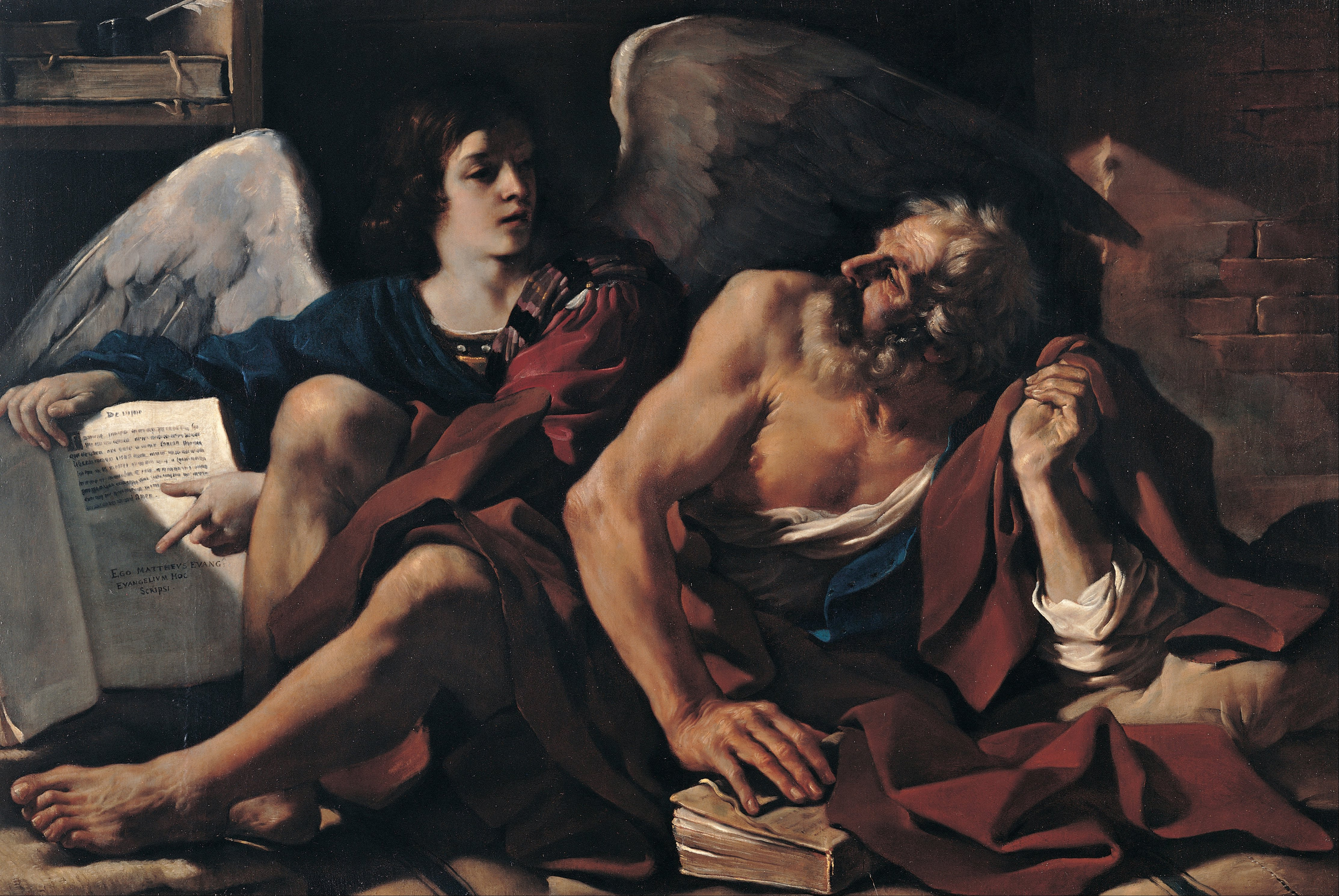
Saint Matthew and the Angel (1621–1622) by Guercino

Saint Matthew and the Angel is a 1621–1622 oil-on-canvas painting, produced by the Italian Baroque artist Guercino during his early years in Rome and now in the Musei Capitolini in Rome.

The work's commissioner is unknown and its first mention in the written record shows it in a 1641 inventory of the Pio collection. It was also recorded in that collection in 1724 and 1750 and at the latter date it was acquired with the whole Pio di Savoia family estate by pope Benedict XIV for the new Museo del Campidoglio (now the Musei Capitolini).
