= Marquis of Castelo Rodrigo =

Marquess of Castelo Rodrigo
- Heraldic crown of a Grandee
- Creation date: 27 December 1598
- Created by: Philip III of Spain (II of Portugal)
- Peerage: Spanish nobility
- First holder: Cristóvão de Moura
- Present holder: Filippo Balbo Bertone di Sambuy
- Subsidiary titles: Count of Lumiares; Baron of Benifayó
- Status: Extant

Marquis of Castelo Rodrigo (Portuguese: Marquês de Castelo Rodrigo) is a hereditary title of Spanish nobility, accompanied by the dignity of Grandee. Originally, it was a title of Portuguese nobility. The title was created by Philip III of Spain (II of Portugal) on 27 December 1598 for Dom Cristóvão de Moura, 1st Count of Castelo Rodrigo. The Moura family claimed its origin from the re-conquest of Moura (Alentejo, Portugal) from the Moors, during the Reconquista in 1165. In July 1621, King Philip IV (III of Portugal) granted the dignity of Grandee to the holder of the title.

Cristóvão de Moura was born in Lisbon 1538. As a Portuguese national, he supported the House of Habsburg during the Portuguese succession crisis of 1580. Moura was rewarded for his service with the title Count of Castelo Rodrigo by Philip I of Portugal (and II of Spain). His son Philip II and III advanced him to Marquis in 1600.

The newly created Marquis was appointed Viceroy of Portugal, controlling Portugal from 29 January 1600 to 1603, again in 1603, and again from February 1608 to 1612. His tenure of the office was not well received by the Portuguese and the high taxes he implemented were strongly resented. The 1st Marquis married Margarita de Corte Real, an heiress who brought the titles and wealth of the Corte-Real family, including governorship of some of the Azores Islands. As a result of this union the two family names were combined to become Moura e Corte-Real.

The couple built a large palace in Lisbon next to the Royal Palace, the Corte Real palace, 50 metres square with wings extending down to the river Tagus, it became the most celebrated private palace in Lisbon. The first Marquis died in Madrid in 1613.

Following the overthrow of the House of Habsburg, by the House of Braganza, in 1640, the family were accused of collaboration and their estates forfeited to the Portuguese crown. These included a hunting estate at Queluz near Lisbon on which now stands the former royal palace Queluz National Palace.

== Marquesses of Castelo Rodrigo ==
The Marquesate has been held by:

1. Dom Cristóvão de Moura, 1st Count and then first Marquess of Castelo Rodrigo.
2. Manuel de Moura, 2nd Marquis of Castelo Rodrigo; (1590–1651). From 1644 to 1647 Governor of the Habsburg Netherlands. Married Leonor de Melo (1594–1641) the daughter Nuno Álvares de Melo, III Marquis de Ferreira.
3. Francisco de Moura, 3rd Marquis of Castelo Rodrigo (1610–1675) was a Spanish political figure. He was created 1st Duke of Nochera in 1656. He served as Viceroy of Sardinia between 1657 and 1661, and Governor of the Habsburg Netherlands between 1664 and 1668. He married Ana Maria de Aragon, daughter of António de Aragon y Moncada, VI Duke Montalto, and Juana de la Cerda, daughter of the Duke of Medinaceli.
4. Dona Leonor de Moura Côrte-Real y Moncada de Aragón, 4th Marchioness de Castelo Rodrigo (1642–1706) was the daughter and heiress of the 3rd Marquess. She married twice: firstly Ángel de Guzmán, the son of the Duke of Medina-Torres, and secondly Carlos Homodei y Pacheco, 2nd Marquess of Almonacid de los Oteros. She had two sons (one from each marriage) but both died young, and therefore, on her death in 1706, she left no surviving issue.
5. Dona Joana de Moura Côrte-Real y Moncada de Aragón, 5th Marchioness of Castelo Rodrigo (ca 1650—1717) was the sister of Dona Leonor and daughter of the 3rd Marquess. She married Giberto Pio, Prince of San Gregorio, half-brother of eminent Cardinal Carlo Pio di Savoia, the patriarch of the somewhat decayed family. The couple had four children, and after Giberto's early death in 1676, the cardinal took care of the two sons, the elder of whom, born in 1672, would succeed her mother on her death as 6th Marquess.
6. Don Francisco Pío de Saboya y Moura, 6th Marquess of Castelo Rodrigo (1672–1723) married Joana Spinola de Lacerda and had four children. He was succeeded by his only son.
7. Don Gisberto Joaquim Pío de Saboya Moura Côrte-Real y Spinola de la Cerda, 7th Marquess of Castelo Rodrigo (1717-1776) married twice but had no issue. Thus he was succeeded by the elder of his two surviving sisters.
8. Dona Isabel María Pío de Saboya Moura Côrte-Real y Spinola de la Cerda, 8th Marchioness of Castel Rodrigo (1719–1799), was the third child of the 6th Marquess. She married twice: firstly Manuel Lopez de Ayala y Fernandez de Velasco, 12th Count of Fuensalida, without issue, and secondly Antonio José Valcarcel y Pérez Pastor, with issue.
9. Don Antonio Valcárcel y Pío de Saboya, 9th Marquess of Castelo Rodrigo (1748-1808), was the son of the above by her second husband. He was born in Alicante in 1748 and died in 1808. He married Maia Tomasa Pasqual del Pobil.
10. Antonio Valcárcel y Pascual de Pobil, 10th Marquess of Castelo Rodrigo, he was also the 8th Duke of Nochera and the 9th Count of Lumiares.
11. María de la Concepción Valcárcel y Pascual de Pobil, 11th Marchioness of Castelo Rodrigo, sister of the previous.
12. Pascual Falcó y Valcárcell, 12th Marquess of Castelo Rodrigo, 9th Marquess of Almonacid de los Oteros and 11th Marquess of Almonacir, among other titles (1795-Florence, 1839). Son of the previous.
13. Juan Jacobo Falcó y Valcárcell, 13th Marquess of Castelo Rodrigo. Brother of the previous.
14. Antonio Falcó y d'Addal, 14th Marquess of Castelo Rodrigo. Son of the previous.
15. Juan Falcó y Trivulziol, 15th Marquess of Castelo Rodrigo. Son of the previous.
16. Alfonso Falcó y de la Gándaral, 16th Marquess of Castelo Rodrigo, 9th Duke of Nochera (he achieved the reinstatement of the title of Duke of Nochera for his family in 1922). Son of the previous.
17. María Asunción Falcó y de la Gándaral, 17th Marchioness of Castelo Rodrigo, 10th Duchess of Nochera. Sister of the previous.
18. Carlo Ernesto Balbo Bertone di Sambuyl, 18th Marquess of Castelo Rodrigo, 11th Duke of Nochera. First cousin once removed of the 16th Marquess and 17th Marchioness.
19. Filippo Balbo Bertone di Sambuy (y Wagnière), 19th Marquess of Castelo Rodrigo, 12th Duke of Nochera, 5th Count of Lumiares. Son of the previous.
