= Carlo Emanuele Pio di Savoia =

Italian cardinal

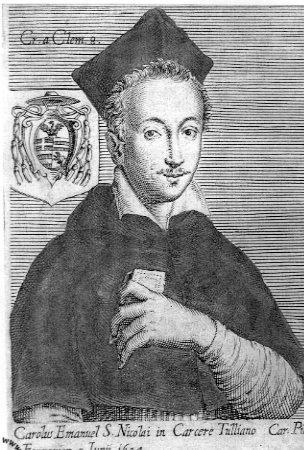
Carlo Emanuele Pio di Savoia

Carlo Emanuele Pio di Savoia (5 January 1585 – 1 June 1641) was an Italian cardinal of the Pio di Savoia family. He was the uncle of Cardinal Carlo Pio di Savoia.

== Life ==
Pio di Savoia was born in Ferrara; his father was Enea Pio di Savoia, Signore di Sassuolo, Consigliere di Stato in Piedmont (1572), knight of the Ordine dell'Annunziata (1576), Piedmontese ambassador to Rome and (from 1591) governor of Reggio. Carlo's mother was Enea's second wife Barbara Turchi, daughter of Ippolito Turchi, first count of Crespino e Ariano, and of Ippolita Tassoni Estense.

He was made cardinal deacon on 9 June 1604 by pope Clement VIII, and made deacon of San Nicola in Carcere on 25 June 1604. Under pope Urban VIII he was made deacon of Santa Maria in Via Lata on 2 October 1623, and then deacon of Santi Giovanni e Paolo and San Lorenzo in Lucina on 16 March 1626.

He was papal legate of the Marche in 1621, cardinal bishop of Albano from 14 June 1627, cardinal bishop of Porto and Santa Rufina from 15 June 1630, cardinal bishop of Velletri from 1638, bishop of Ostia from 28 March 1639.

He died in Rome in 1641.
