= Francisco de Moura Corte Real, 3rd Marquis of Castelo Rodrigo =

Portuguese noble, diplomat (1621–1675)

Francisco de Moura
- 3rd Marquis of Castelo Rodrigo; 1st Duke of Nochera; 2nd Count of Lumiares
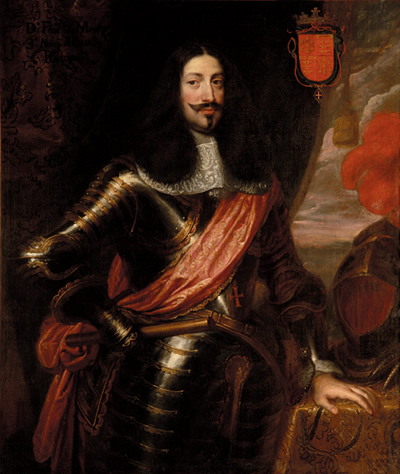

Ambassador of Spain to the Holy Roman Empire
- In office 1648–1656
- Monarch: Philip IV
- Valido: Luis de Haro
- Preceded by: Diego de Aragón Tagliavia
- Succeeded by: Gaspar de Teves y Tello de Guzmán

Viceroy of Sardinia
- In office 1657 – 1 June 1662
- Monarch: Philip IV
- Preceded by: Francisco Fernández de Castro Andrade (as interim)
- Succeeded by: Pedro Vico, Archbishop of Cagliari

Viceroy of Catalonia
- In office 1663 – January 1664
- Monarch: Philip IV
- Preceded by: Francisco de Orozco, 2nd Marquis of Mortara
- Succeeded by: Vicente de Gonzaga y Doria

Vice Governor-General of the Spanish Netherlands
- In office 23 March – September 1664
- Monarch: Philip IV
- Secretary of Flanders Affairs: Ramiro Núñez de Guzmán
- Governor-General of the Spanish Netherlands: Luis de Benavides Carrillo, Marquis of Caracena

Governor-General of the Spanish Netherlands
- In office September 1664 – 1668
- Monarchs: Philip IV; Charles II
- Regent: Mariana of Austria
- Valido: Juan Everardo Nithard
- Preceded by: Luis de Benavides Carrillo
- Succeeded by: Íñigo Melchor de Velasco, 7th Duke of Frías

Caballerizo mayor of the King and Queen regent of Spain
- In office 1669 – 26 November 1675
- Monarch: Charles II
- Regent: Mariana of Austria
- Preceded by: Pedro Portocarrero y Aragón
- Succeeded by: Juan Gaspar Enríquez de Cabrera y Sandoval

President of the Supreme Council of Flanders
- In office 16 August 1670 – 26 November 1675
- Monarch: Charles II
- Regent: Mariana of Austria
- Valido: Juan Everardo Nithard; Fernando de Valenzuela
- Preceded by: Luis de Benavides Carrillo
- Succeeded by: Íñigo Melchor de Velasco
- Born: 13 December 1621; Madrid, Spanish Empire
- Died: 26 November 1675 (aged 54); Madrid, Spanish Empire
- Spouse: Anna Maria Moncada y Aragón
- Issue: Leonor de Moura, Marchioness of Castelo Rodrigo
Names
- Francisco de Moura Corterreal y Melo
- Father: Manuel de Moura, 2nd Marquis of Castelo Rodrigo
- Mother: Leonor de Melo
- Religion: Roman Catholicism

Military service
- Allegiance: Spanish Empire
- Branch/service: Spanish Army; Army of Flanders
- Years of service: 1657–1668
- Rank: Captain general
- Battles/wars: War of Devolution

Francisco de Moura Corte Real, 3rd Marquis of Castelo Rodrigo (13 December 1621 – 26 November 1675) was a Portuguese nobleman who served as Viceroy of Spanish Sardinia and Governor of the Spanish Netherlands.

== Life ==
Francisco de Moura was the son of the Portuguese nobleman, Manuel de Moura, 2nd Marquis of Castelo Rodrigo, who had been governor of the Habsburg Netherlands between 1644 and 1647, and of Leonor de Melo. A member of the Corte-Real family, he was a gentleman of the chamber of King Philip III, later member of his council of state and his ambassador to Vienna between 1649 and 1656.

He was named Duke of Nochera on 10 August 1656, and served as viceroy of Sardinia between 1657 and 1661, and governor of the Habsburg Netherlands between 1664 and 1668. Under his administration, the Spanish Netherlands suffered a French invasion during the War of Devolution. By this time, Spain was so weak that it could put up very little resistance to the French assault. The French even spoke of "une promenade militaire." Moura was later appointed as caballerizo mayor to the king and died in Madrid in December 1675.

== Sources ==
- Castro Pereira Mouzinho de Albuquerque e Cunha, Fernando de (1995). Instrumentário Genealógico - Linhagens Milenárias (in Portuguese). pp. 329–30.
- Costa Felgueiras Gaio, Manuel José da. Nobiliário das Famílias de Portugal (in Portuguese). Vol. VII. Portugal: Beltroens.
- Hobbs, Nicolas (2007). "Grandes de España" (in Spanish).
- Sousa, Dom António Caetano de (1946). História Genealógica da Casa Real Portuguesa (in Portuguese). Vol. VI (2ª Edição ed.). Coimbra, Portugal: Atlântida-Livraria Editora, Lda.
- Instituto de Salazar y Castro. Elenco de Grandezas y Titulos Nobiliarios Españoles (in Spanish). periodic publication.

Government offices
Preceded by Bernardo Matías de Cervelló	Viceroy of Sardinia; 1657–1661	Succeeded by Archbishop of Cagliari
Preceded by The Marquis of Caracena	Governor-General of the Spanish Netherlands; 1664–1668	Succeeded by The Duke of Frías
Portuguese nobility
Preceded by Manuel de Moura	Marquis of Castel Rodrigo; 1651–1675	Succeeded by Leonor de Moura
Preceded by Manuel de Moura	Count of Lumiares; 1651–1675	Succeeded by Leonor de Moura
Italian nobility
Preceded by Vacant fief	Duke of Nocera; 1656–1675	Succeeded by Leonor de Moura
