= Corte Real Palace =

Former city palace of the Corte Real family in Lisbon, Portugal

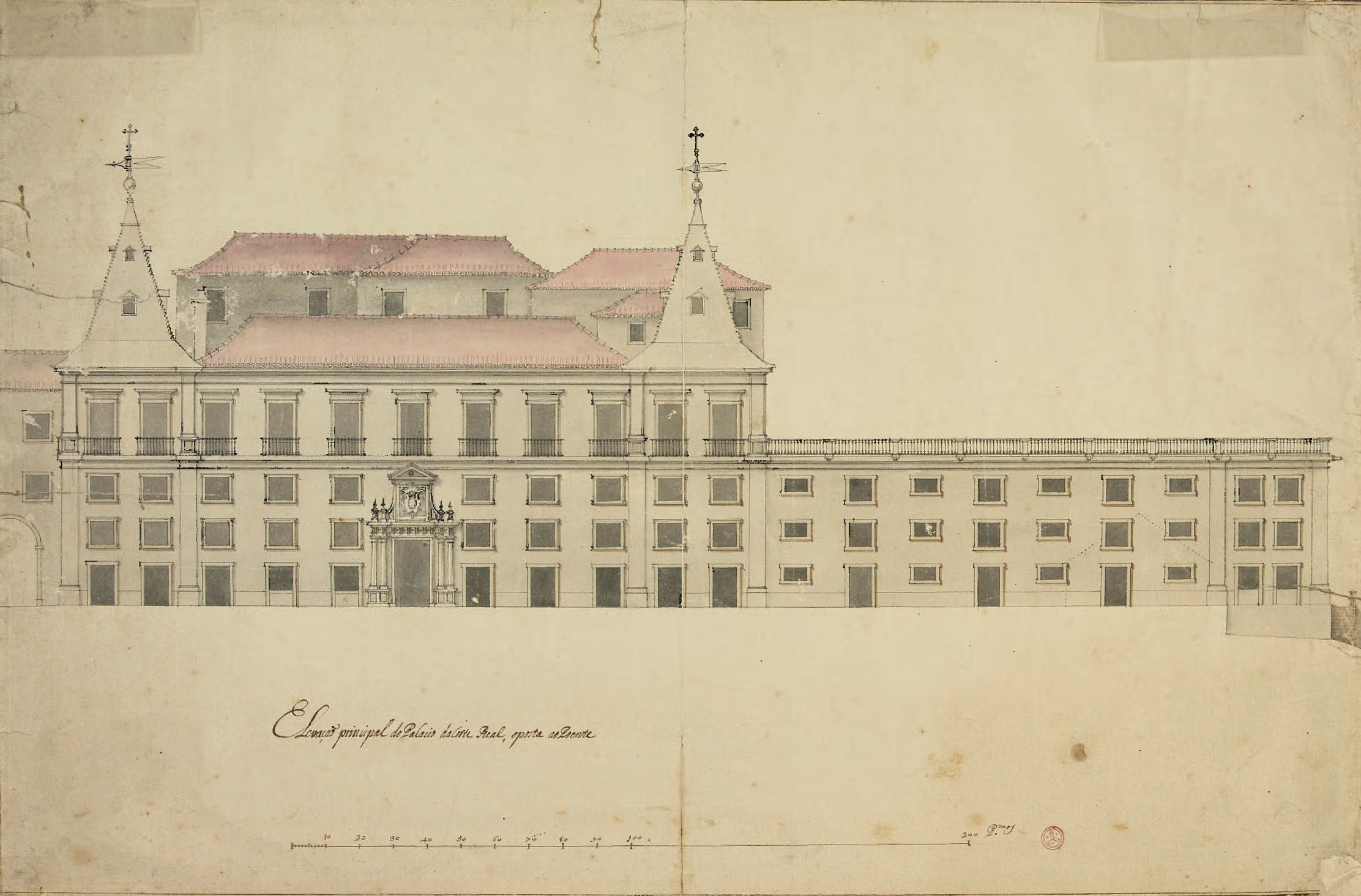
Façade of the Corte Real Palace in Lisbon

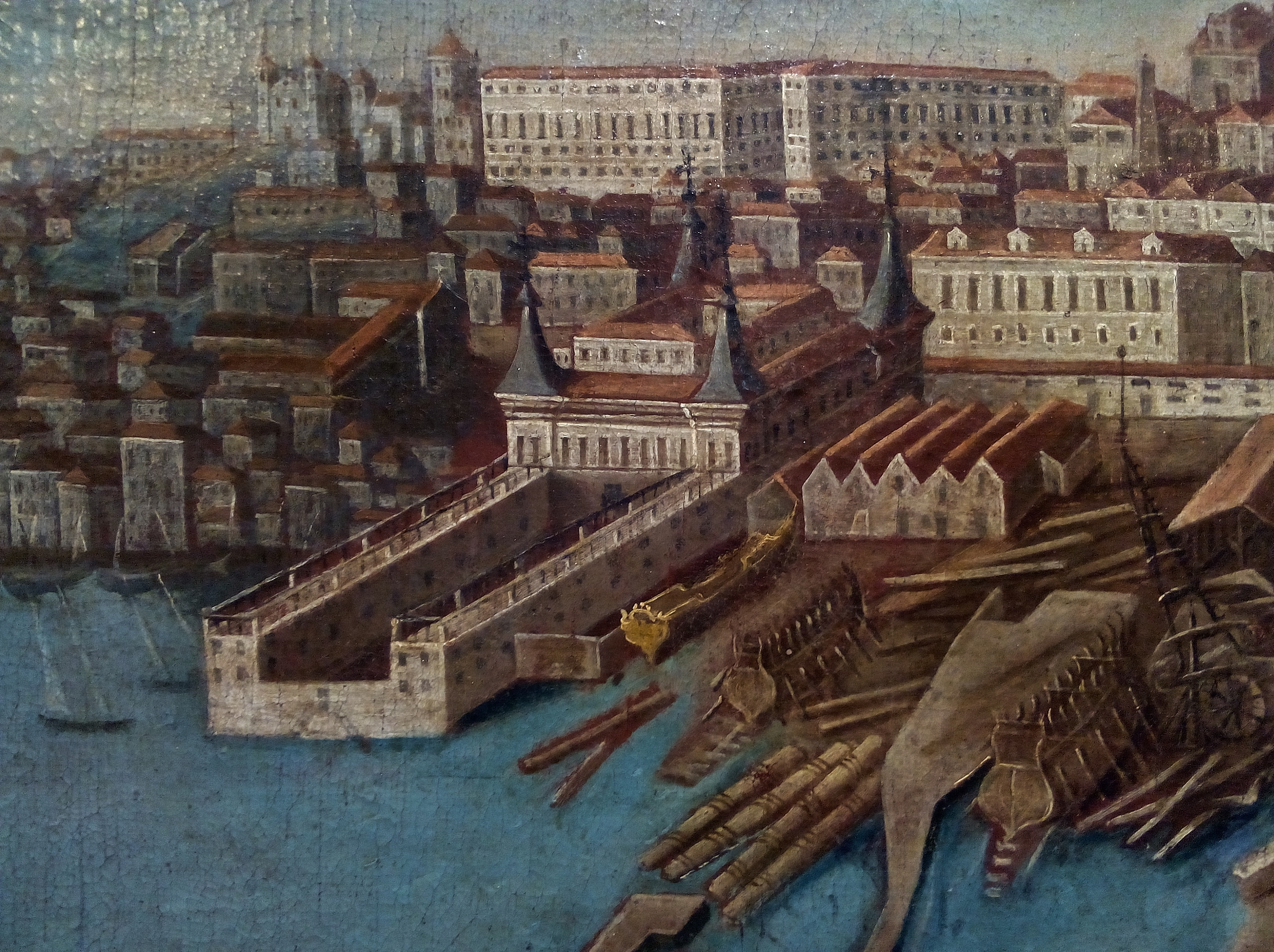
The Corte Real Palace with the wings extending to the Tagus

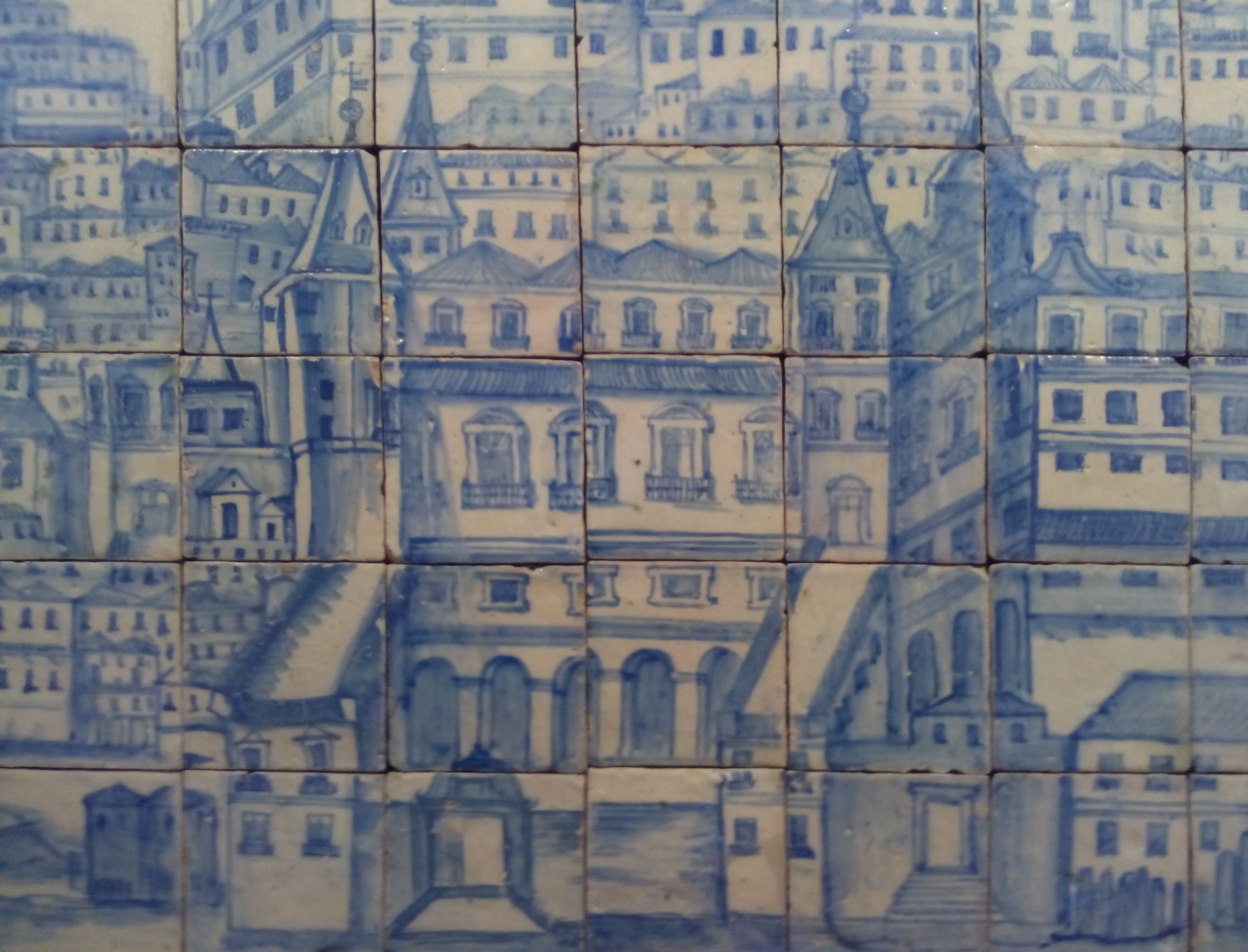
Tiles depicting the Corte Real Palace

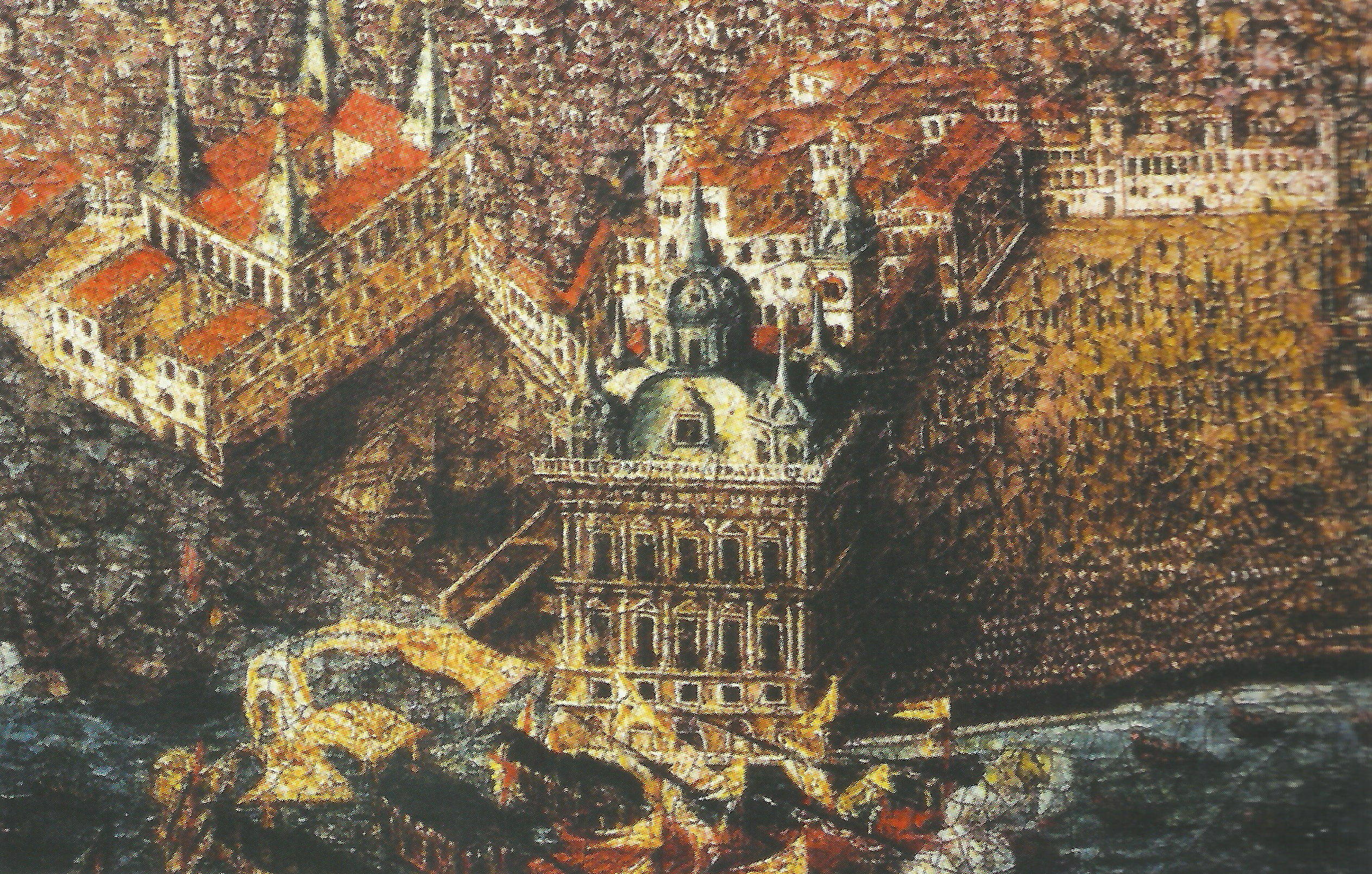
The Corte Real palace with the Ribeira palace on the right on the "View of Lisbon" painting in Schloss Weilburg

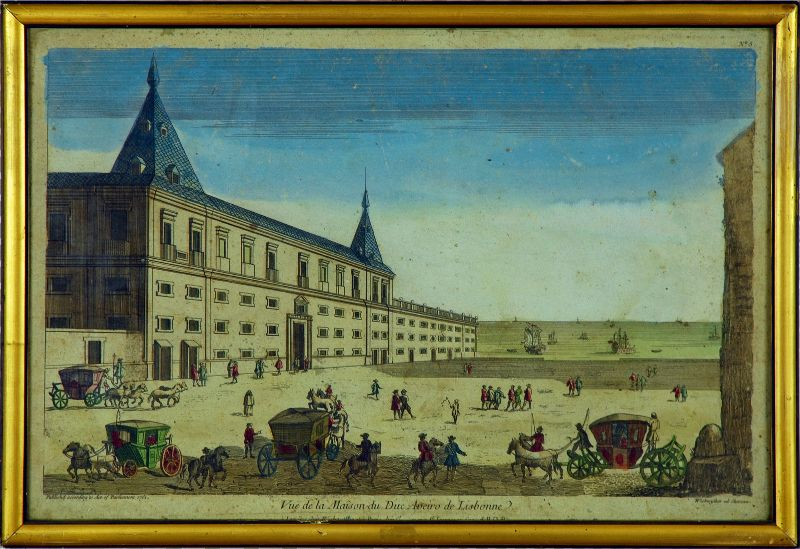
View of the main façade

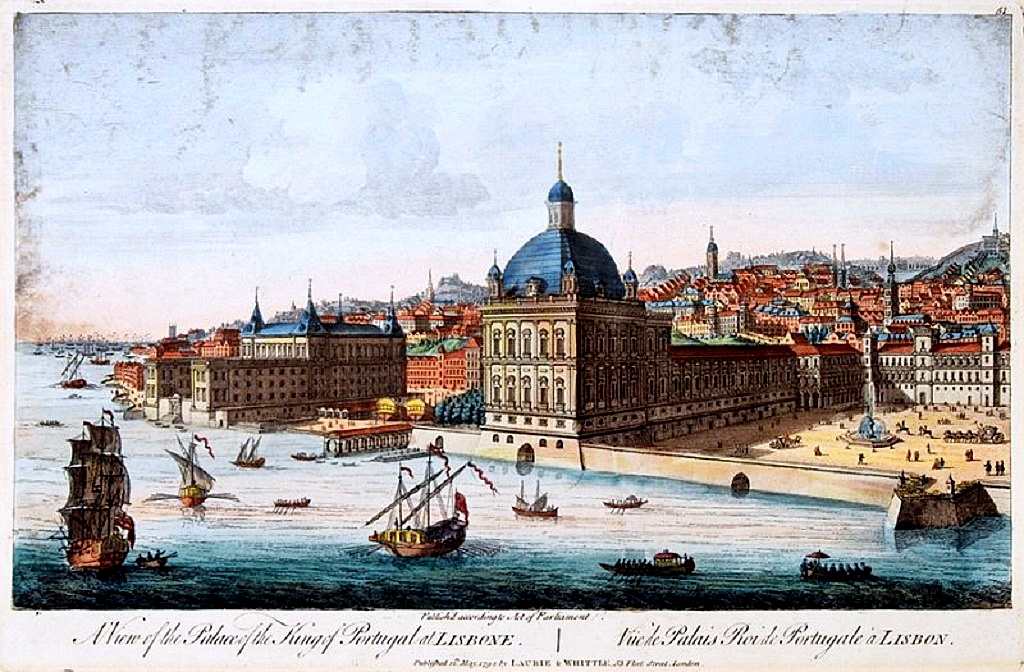
An engraving showing the Ribeira palace and the Corte Real Palace on the left

The Corte Real Palace (Portuguese: Palácio Corte Real) was a former palace in Lisbon, Portugal. It was constructed by the Corte Real family at the start of the 17th century, and subsequently owned by the Portuguese royal family. It was heavily damaged by fire in 1751, and the remainder was destroyed during the 1755 Lisbon earthquake.

== History ==
=== 1st Marquess of Castelo Rodrigo ===
Cristóvão de Moura (1538–1613) was a Portuguese nobleman who established his fortune during the second of half of the sixteenth century. He backed the claims of King Philip II of Spain to the throne of Portugal and led the Spanish party during Portuguese succession crisis of 1580 that led to the Iberian Union. Among other privileges and rewards, king Philip II ennobled him and granted him the title of 1st Count of Castelo Rodrigo in 1594. In 1600, under the king's successor, Philip III of Spain, he was further elevated by being made the 1st Marquis of Castelo Rodrigo.

The newly created marquess was appointed Viceroy of Portugal, controlling Portugal from 1600 to 1603, and again from 1608 to 1612. The Portuguese people did not receive his tenure of the office very well, and the high taxes he implemented were strongly resented.

The 1st marquess married Margarita Corte Real, an heiress who brought him the titles and wealth of the Corte Real family, including governorship of some of the Azores. As a result of this union the two family names were combined to become Moura e Corte Real.

In 1585, the coupled constructed a large city palace in Lisbon, next to the royal Ribeira Palace, to which it was connected by a walk way. The palace was named the Corte Real Palace. It was a 50 metres square building with four imposing turrets on its corners, and two wings extending down to the Tagus river. The palace became the most celebrated city palace in Lisbon.

Next to the Corte Real Palace, the couple also constructed a palace in Cristóvão's hometown, the Castle of Castelo Rodrigo.

=== 2nd Marquess of Castel Rodrigo ===
The 1st marquess was succeeded by his son, Manuel de Moura Corte Real, 2nd Marquis of Castelo Rodrigo (1590–1651). He was ambassador to Rome, where he was patron to Borromini and François Duquesnoy. His embassy came to an end with the revolt of Portugal in December 1640. As the 2nd marquess remained loyal to Spanish Habsburg crown, his estates in Portugal were confiscated by the new monarchy, including the Corte Real palace. Also, the castle of Castelo Rodrigo was lost, as it was burned by the local community.

=== Portuguese royal family ===
After the confiscation, the Corte Real palace became property of the Portuguese royal family.

Significant reconstruction was performed when the palace became the official residence of Infante Peter, the future king Peter II of Portugal (1648–1706), and his consorts Maria Francisca of Savoy (1646–1683) and Maria Sophia of Neuburg (1666–1699). As part of the large works executed, an additional floor was added to the palace. After the dethronement of Afonso VI of Portugal, Peter II moved to the royal palace. From then on, the Corte Real palace served as the main residence of the Infantado, the appanage for the second eldest son of the Portuguese monarch.

In July 1751, a fire heavily damaged the Corte Real palace, and what little remained disappeared during the 1755 Lisbon earthquake. Reconstruction, which was considered, was never done.

== Literature ==
- Lourenço, Ana Cristina; Soromenho, Miguel; Sequeira Mendes, Fernando (2007). "Felipe II en Lisboa. Moldear la ciudad a la imagen del rey". In De Riano Lozano, Carlos (ed.). Juan de Herrera: Arquitecto real (in Spanish). Madrid: Lunwerg Editores. pp. 125–156. ISBN 978-8477824350.
- Martinez Hernandez, Santiago (2011). "D. Cristóvão de Moura e a Casa dos Marqueses de Castelo Rodrigo. Proposta de investigação e linhas de análise sobre a figura do grande privado de D. Filipe I". Governo, política e representações do poder no Portugal Habsburgo e nos seus territórios ultramarinos (1581-1640) (in Portuguese). Lisbon: Centro de História de Além Mar. pp. 69–96.
- Fonseca, Jorge (January 2014). "O Palácio de Cristóvão de Moura, Marquês de Castelo Rodrigo e Vice-Rei de Portugal: contributo para o seu estudo". Promontoria (in Portuguese). 11: 191–201.
- Garcia Cueto, David (2014). "Servicio regio y estrategia familiar Los marqueses de Castel Rodrigo y la importación del gusto romano en Lisboa y Madrid durante el siglo XVII". Portuguese Studies Review (in Portuguese). 22: 129–159.
