= Manuel de Moura Corte Real, 2nd Marquis of Castelo Rodrigo =

Portuguese noble (1590–1651)

Manuel de Moura
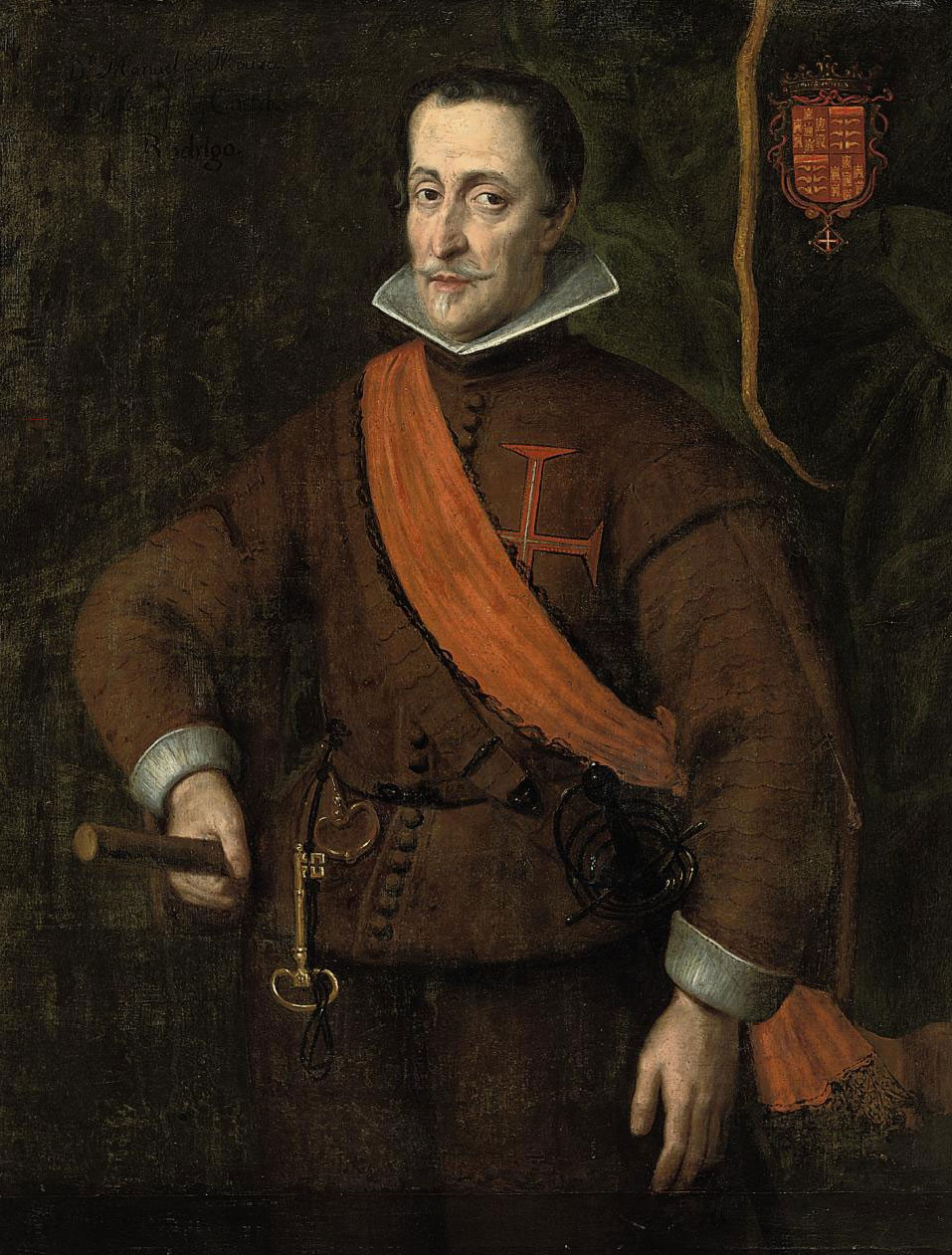
- Born: 1590
- Died: 28 January 1651 (aged 60–61)
- Title: Marquis of Castelo Rodrigo
- Spouse: Leonor de Melo

D. Manuel de Moura Corte Real, 2nd Marquis of Castelo Rodrigo, (Archaic Portuguese: Manoel de Moura e Côrte-Real), (1590 – 28 January 1651), was Governor of the Habsburg Netherlands from 1644 to 1647.

== Life ==
Manuel de Moura e Corte Real was the second of three marquises named Castelo Rodrigo. Although the family served the King of Spain, it was Portuguese and its roots were in Lisbon. His father's family traced its origin to the reconquest of Moura (Alentejo, Portugal) from the Moors, during the Reconquista in 1165, but its fortune was established in the late sixteenth century, when Cristóvão de Moura (1528–1613), the first Marquis of Castelo Rodrigo backed the claims of the Spanish king, Philip II, to the throne of Portugal in the 1580 Portuguese succession crisis that led to the Iberian Union. His mother was the head of the Corte-Real family.

Manuel de Moura e Corte Real married Leonor de Melo. His oldest surviving son and heir, Francisco de Moura, destined to become the third Marquis of Castelo Rodrigo was born in 1610. Like his father, he eventually became governor of the Southern Netherlands.

Manuel entered the service of the Habsburg crown in 1615 as Gentleman of the Chamber of the future Philip III of Portugal. When the prince succeeded to the throne as Philip IV in 1621, Castelo Rodrigo was kept on the sidelines by his jealous rival Gaspar de Guzmán, Count-Duke of Olivares, still insecure in his position as favorite.

Castelo Rodrigo was transferred back to Lisbon to arm a fleet in 1627, but was recalled to court temporarily in 1630, when Olivares decided to put his rival to use in the service of Habsburg diplomacy. Castelo Rodrigo was appointed ambassador to Rome, where he was a patron to Borromini and the sculptor François Duquesnoy.

Castelo Rodrigo's embassy came to an end with the revolt of Portugal in December 1640. He remained unswervingly loyal to the Spanish Habsburg crown, suffering extensive losses of family lands in Portugal, including the Corte Real palace. Even so, it was impolitic to have a Portuguese serving as a Spanish ambassador during the revolt, and Olivares was not completely sure of Castelo Rodrigo's loyalty.

In 1642, he was sent to Vienna, where he served until May 1644. From June 1644 he served in Brussels as adjunct governor of the Netherlands. He worked for the cause of peace between the United Provinces and Spain, and was instrumental in the preliminary negotiations which set in motion the peace conference of Münster. He served as Philip IV's trusted minister until his recall in 1647.

Castelo Rodrigo arrived in Madrid on 14 January 1648, where he is recorded in 1649 in the position of Mayordomo mayor in the royal palace. A portrait formerly ascribed to Velázquez shows him bearing his age with dignity . He died in Madrid in 1651 at the age of 61.

== Sources ==
- Castro Pereira Mouzinho de Albuquerque e Cunha, Fernando de (1995). Instrumentário Genealógico - Linhagens Milenárias (in Portuguese). pp. 329–30.
- Costa Felgueiras Gaio, Manuel José da. Nobiliário das Famílias de Portugal (in Portuguese). Vol. VII. Portugal: Beltroens.
- Hobbs, Nicolas (2007). "Grandes de España" (in Spanish).
- Sousa, Dom António Caetano de (1946). História Genealógica da Casa Real Portuguesa (in Portuguese). Vol. VI (2ª Edição ed.). Coimbra, Portugal: Atlântida-Livraria Editora, Lda.
- Instituto de Salazar y Castro. Elenco de Grandezas y Titulos Nobiliarios Españoles (in Spanish). periodic publication.
- Santiago Martínez Hernández, "Aristocracia y anti-olivarismo: el proceso al marqués de Castelo Rodrigo, embajador en Roma, por sodomía y traición (1634-1635)", in: José Martínez Millán, Manuel Rivero Rodríguez and Gijs Versteegen (edd.), La Corte en Europa: Política y Religión (siglos XVI-XVIII), Ediciones Polifemo, Madrid 2012, vol. II, pp. 1147–1196.
- David García Cueto, "Mecenazgo y representación del marqués de Castel Rodrigo durante su embajada en Roma", in: Roma y España, un crisol de la cultura europea en la Edad Moderna, edited by Carlos José Hernando Sánchez, SEACEX, Madrid 2007, Vol. 2, 2007, pp. 695–716.
- Joseph Connors, “Borromini and the Marchese di Castel Rodrigo,” in The Burlington Magazine, 133, 1991, pp. 434-440.
- Joseph Connors, "The Portuguese Genealogy of Wenceslas Hollar and the Lost Lisbon Monuments by François Duquesnoy", in Print quarterly, 36, 2019, pp. 17-30.

Government offices
Preceded by Marquis of Tor de Laguna	Governor-General of the Spanish Netherlands; 1644–1647	Succeeded by Archduke Leopold Wilhelm
Portuguese nobility
Preceded by Cristóvão de Moura	Marquis of Castelo Rodrigo; 1621–1651	Succeeded by Francisco de Moura
New title	Count of Lumiares; 1607–1651	Succeeded by Francisco de Moura
