= Eleanor de Moura =

Spanish noblewoman

- Leonor de Moura y Moncada

Viceroy of Sicily
- In office 18 April 1677 – 13 May 1677
- Monarch: Charles II
- Preceded by: Anielo de Guzmán y Carafa
- Succeeded by: Luis Manuel Fernández de Portocarrero

Personal details
- Born: c. 1642
- Died: 28 November 1706 (age about 64) Madrid, Spain
- Spouse(s): Anielo de Guzmán y Carafa; Carlos Homo-Dei, Marquis of Almonacid de los Oteros and of Almonacir
- Children: 2 (predeceased)

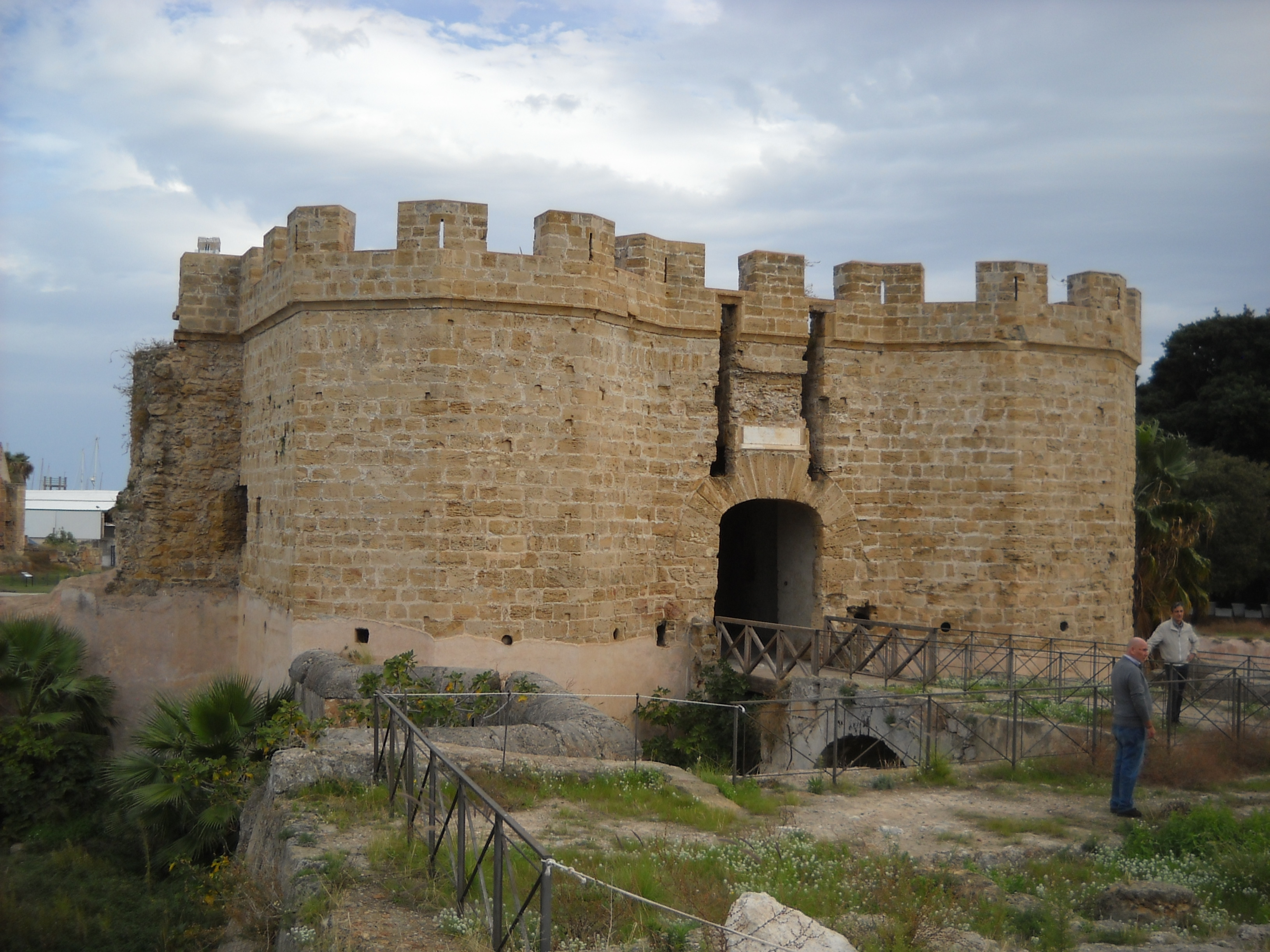
Castello a Mare, Eleanor's residence as vicereine

Eleanor de Moura (Spanish: Leonor de Moura y Corterreal y Moncada de Aragón, Italian: Eleonora de Moura; c. 1642 – 28 November 1706) was a Spanish noblewoman of Portuguese birth, notable for serving as Viceroy of Sicily for one month in 1677.

== Biography ==
Her father was Francisco de Moura Corte Real, 3rd Marquis of Castelo Rodrigo and her mother was Anna Maria Moncada y Aragón. Her father had served as a viceroy of Sardinia and Catalonia, and later as governor of the Habsburg Netherlands. In 1664 Leonor married Aniello (Angelo) de Guzmàn y Carafa.

When Eleanor's father died in 1675, she inherited his titles becoming Marquise of Castel Rodrigo and Duchess of Nocera. In 1676 Aniello was named interim Viceroy of Sicily and so the couple moved into Castello a Mare, Palermo. When Aniello died on 18 April 1677, he named his widow his successor in a letter. She was sworn in before the Royal Ministers and quickly passed a large number of progressive reforms:

- re-establishing the Conservatorio per le Vergini pericolanti (collegium for endangered girls), such as girls (especially orphans) who were vulnerable to exploitation and at risk of prostitution
- offering a royal dowry so poor girls could marry
- re-establishing an asylum for older prostitutes
- establishing the Conservatorio delle Ripentite (Collegium of the Penitents), to help prostitutes who wanted to give up their profession.
- cutting taxes on men with large families
- lowering the price of bread
- establishing the Magistrate of Commerce

Eleanor's actions earned her the opposition of the established power-brokers of Sicily, and they were able to force her out by pointing out that the Viceroy was also the papal legate, a role that could not be fulfilled by a woman; she was dismissed, and a law was passed forbidding the viceroy from passing his role on to his wife.

Eleanor returned to Spain, where in 1679 she married Carlos Homo-Dei Lasso de la Vega, second Marquis of Almonacid de los Oteros, Superior Commander of the Military Order of Christ.

From both of her marriages Eleonora had a son. Although not mentioned in the main genealogies, her first son, Félix de Guzmán y Carafa, was born around 1669-1670 and disappeared in 1688 while on a voyage to Malta. Suspicions have been raised that he might have been murdered because he was the most likely candidate for his paternal family's colossal inheritance. It was then in the hands of his uncle Nicolás, who would die childless the following year, as well as his other reckless uncle Domingo, thus leaving his half-aunt Mariana de Guzmán y Vélez Ladrón de Guevara, married into the powerful family of the Dukes of Medina Sidonia, as the only presumptive heiress.

On 28 February 1680 Eleonora had also given birth to another son from her second marriage, but he died in October of the same year.

When she too died in 1706, her titles went to her sister Juana.

== Cultural depictions ==
Eleanor's story is retold in the 2013 Andrea Camilleri novel The Revolution of the Moon.
