= Brigida Pico della Mirandola =

Italian noblewoman (1633–1720)

- Princess Regent of Mirandola
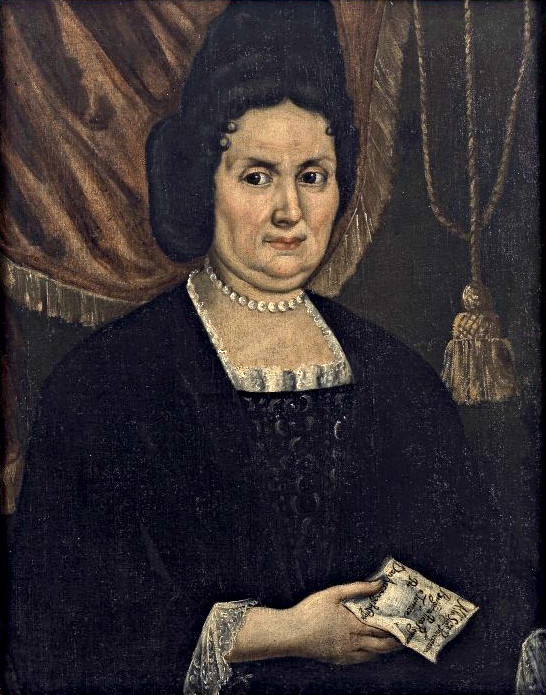

- Coat of arms
- Born: 17 October 1633; Mirandola
- Died: 22 January 1720 (aged 86); Padua
- Buried: 1720; Blessed Luca Belludi chapel, Basilica of Saint Anthony, Padua
- Father: Galeotto IV Pico della Mirandola
- Mother: Maria Cybo-Malaspina

Brigida Pico della Mirandola (17 October 1633 – 22 January 1720) was an Italian noblewoman, Princess Regent of Mirandola and Concordia for fifteen years (from 1691 to 1706), in the name and on behalf of her nephew Francesco Maria II Pico della Mirandola, whose grandfather was her brother Alessandro II Pico della Mirandola. She ruled despotically with a policy that led to the fall of the Duchy of Mirandola.

== Life ==
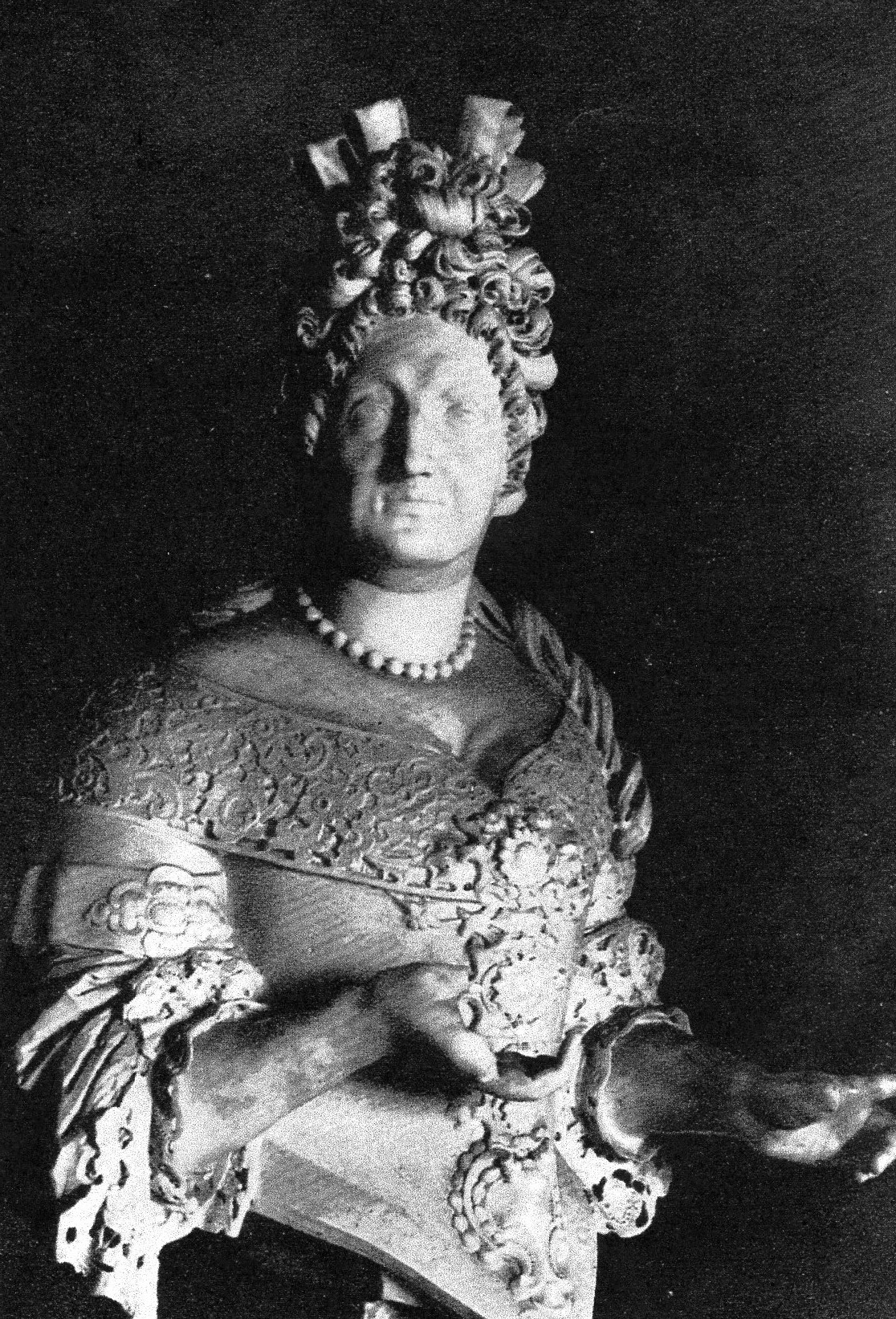
Lorenzo Ottoni, Bust of the Princess Brigida Pico della Mirandola

Brigida was the fourth child of the hereditary Duke of Mirandola Galeotto IV Pico (1606–1637) and Maria Cybo-Malaspina (1609–1652). The latter was the daughter of the Prince of Massa and Marquis of Carrara Carlo I Cybo-Malaspina and Brigida Spinola. Her other eight siblings were Laura, Virginia Brigida, Alessandro II, Giovanni, Virginia, Fulvia, Caterina, and Laura. His father died two months before his parent Alessandro I, who had him by Eleonora Segni of Ferrara: he was succeeded by the natural branch of the family represented by his brother Alessandro II. Brigida was born and lived mainly in the castle of Mirandola, but also in the palace of Concordia.

Brigida lived until the age of 58 - she had not married - in the court of her grandfather and brother, not anticipating the decisive and not always positive role she would play in the destiny of the Duchy of Mirandola. She was, however, regarded less than benevolently by courtiers and subjects alike: the 'less embarrassing' epithets attributed to her were bigoted spinster or terrible old woman (bigotta zitella o terribile vecchiaccia).

In fact, it fell to her to administer the small State of Mirandola in the last decades of its existence, as guardian of her nephew of just three years old Francesco Maria II Pico della Mirandola (1688–1747), heir to Francesco (1661–1689), the only son of her brother Alessandro II, and Anna Borghese. To everyone's disappointment, she took over the government in an authoritarian manner, fuelling various conspiracies and ridiculing the unsuspecting Duke, who did not succeed in rebelling against her until fifteen years later, but fell into the net of disloyal advisors who induced him to ally with Spain against France with disastrous results.

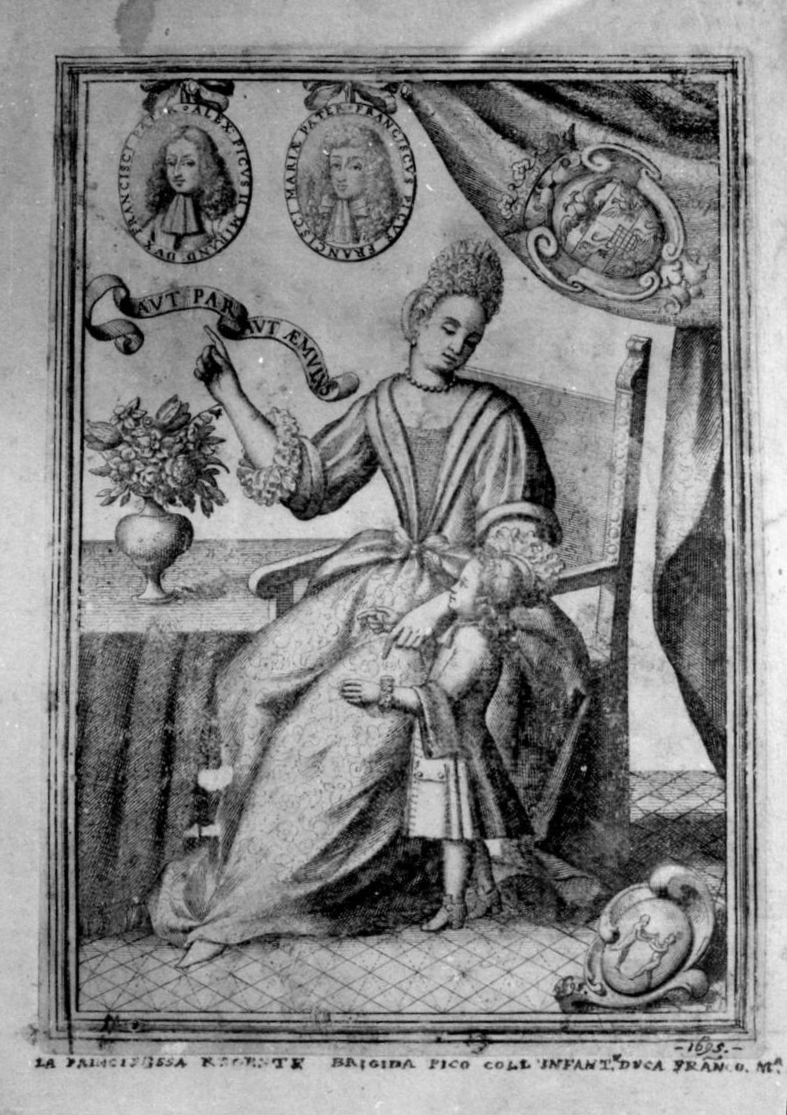
Princess Regent Brigida Pico shows the infant Duke Francesco Maria the portraits of his father Francesco and grandfather Alessandro II (brother of Brigida).

Alexander II, in his will, appointed his sister Brigida as regent for his young nephew until he reached the age of 18, excluding his three cadet sons Galeotto, Giovanni, and Ludovico. They punctually contested their father's will and their aunt, who, despite her imperious temperament, was, unlike them, fond of the young duchino.

Princess Brigida, however, immediately made herself unpopular: as a first act, at the suggestion of some Jesuits who were always close to her, she completely replaced the members of the courtly council, causing the people to be displeased by her arrogance and haughtiness. The animosity increased when Brigida denied her recalcitrant nephews the increase of the appanage left to them by their father. The situation worsened further when news leaked out of an alleged plot hatched by the three Pico to poison their nephew and depose the inconvenient relative. Brigid had the supposed conspirators put on trial and again denied the grandchildren an economic upgrade. The situation, however, became untenable and the regent, in order to calm the waters, withdrew to Venice, delegating powers to another daughter of Alessandro II, Isabella Pico, who manfully coped with the problems. Brigid, with the young duke and her inseparable advisor Father Tagliani, returned to the Serenissima on 31 January 1697. The imperial court in Vienna freed Galeotto, Giovanni, and Ludovico Pico from charges of attempted murder and invited the duchess to make peace with them. Brigida, however, categorically refused and bitterly reprimanded the duke who had reconciled with his uncles. She even took it out on the Roman Curia. The regent, moreover, never left the castle of Mirandola for fear of attack or revenge, and when she was forced to do so, her carriage was always escorted by several armigers.

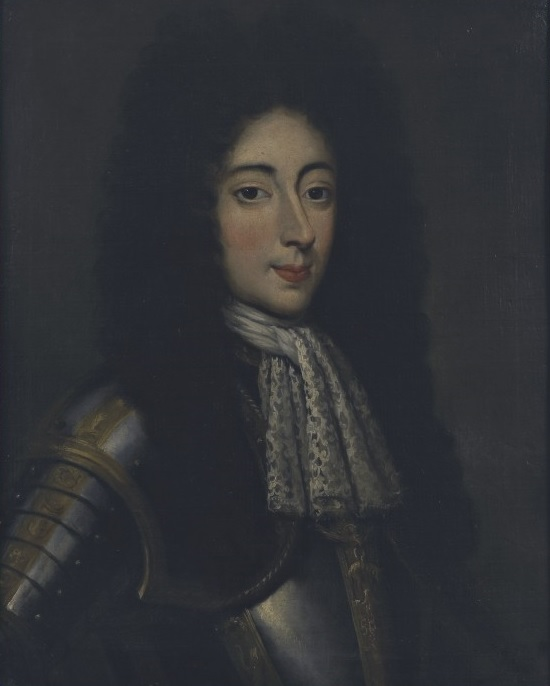
Francesco Maria II Pico della Mirandola, last Duke of Mirandola

In the meantime, the War of the Spanish Succession had begun, in which Austria and France were the eternal antagonists. The Duchy of Mirandola, strategic for the artery that ran through it from the north, was always siding with Spain. Prince Eugene of Savoy, commander of the imperial army, let Brigida know to immediately remove the Franco-Spanish garrisons and she was forced to side with Austria. In 1702, the French uprising convinced the Princess Regent that it would be a good idea to repair to Ferrara, then back to Venice, with her niece Isabella, the silverware and precious possessions of the Pico della Mirandola family. This time 14-year-old Francesco Maria II Pico had the courage to rebel and remained in Mirandola. In 1706, he succeeded in freeing himself from the yoke of the old virago, who had had the council approve a decree allowing her to continue the regency in spite of her nephew's majority. But the fate of the territory of Mirandola and Concordia was now sealed: on 15 July 1710 it was incorporated into the Duchy of Modena.

Brigida, meanwhile, old but very rich, settled in Padua (her mother had lived there in her last years), where she died, aged 87, on 22 January 1720. She was buried in Basilica of Saint Anthony of Padua, on the left wall of the Blessed Luca Belludi chapel: an epigraph celebrating her virtues of virginity, prudence, erudition and virile character was dedicated to her.

On the other hand, her grand-nephew Francesco Maria II Pico ended his life in exile in 1747, without heirs, in Madrid.

== Bibliography ==
- Bruno Andreolli; Vittorio Erlindo, eds. (2001). 1596–1597: Mirandola piccola capitale. Mirandola: EM.
- Vilmo Cappi (2000). La Mirandola. Storia urbanistica di una città. Mirandola: Pivetti.
- Fabrizio Ferri (1974). Mirandola il regno dei Pico. Modena: Libreria Editrice Fiera del Libro.
- Jader Jacobelli (1993). Quei due Pico della Mirandola. Bari: Laterza.
- Pompeo Litta (1835). Famiglie celebri di Italia. Pico della Mirandola. Torino. p. 5.

== See also ==
- Duchy of Mirandola
- Francesco Maria II Pico della Mirandola
- Castle of the Pico
