= Francesco Pio di Savoia =

Spanish nobleman of Italian birth

Francesco Pio di Savoia, later in Spain Francisco Pío de Saboya y Moura (1672–1723) was a Spanish nobleman of Italian birth who held numerous hereditary and awarded titles. From his father, in particular, he inherited the title of 3rd Prince of San Gregorio (with which he has remained mainly known, as Principe Pío), from his mother the title of 6th Marquis of Castelo Rodrigo and, only nominally, that of 4th Duke of Nocera, with which his younger brother Luigi was instead invested during the Austrian Habsburg domination of the Kingdom of Naples.

== Life ==
Francesco was born in 1672 to Juana de Moura y Moncada de Aragón, a Spanish noblewoman of Portuguese ancestry, and Giberto Pio di Savoia (1639–1676), descendant of an ancient and somewhat decayed seignorial family from Emilia, who died when his son was just four years old.

Francesco grew up in Rome under the care of his half-uncle, cardinal Carlo Pio di Savoia, the patriarch of the family, and of his youngest uncle, the prelate Enea. Towards the end of the century he moved to seek his fortune in Spain with his aunt Leonor de Moura y Moncada de Aragón who held his maternal family's assets and titles before they were passed on to his mother in 1706.

At the outbreak of the War of the Spanish Succession he immediately espoused the cause of Philip V of Bourbon, and joined his army. He had a distinguished military career, being made a "mariscal de campo" (lieutenant general) of the Royal Spanish Armies in 1705, inducted into the Order of the Golden Fleece in 1708 and confirmed as a Grandee of Spain in 1721. He went on to hold various governmental positions including Governor-General of the Kingdom of Sicily, Governor of Madrid and Captain-General of Catalonia. When his mother died in 1717, Francesco effectively succeeded her in her Spanish titles, specifically as Marquis of Castel Rodrigo, but only nominally as Duke of Nocera in the Kingdom of Naples. For, in 1707, during the developments of the War of the Spanish Succession, the noblewoman had refused to pay feudal homage to the new Neapolitan ruler Charles of Habsburg (the future Emperor Charles VI) and had been stripped of her titles for felony.

He married some time before 1712 to Juana Spínola Colonna y de la Cerda (1683–1738), herself a scion of Spanish-Genoese nobility, and they had a son, Gisberto, and 3 daughters: Margherita Eleonora, Lucrezia and Isabel Maria, who themselves all went on to marry high-ranking Spanish-Italian nobles. Gisberto Pío de Saboya y Spinola died without issue in 1776 and the hereditary titles were passed on through Isabel Maria's line.

Francesco drowned in Madrid, together with his sister-in-law, María Teresa Spínola y de la Cerda, on 15 September 1723, when a storm swept his carriage into the Manzanares River.

The Príncipe Pío hill and the nearby multimodal train station Príncipe Pío in Madrid are named after him.

== Legacy ==
During the 19th Century, the family titles passed to the Italian-Spanish Falcó family, descended from Isabel Maria, and when they died out in the mid-20th century, the titles passed to a line of the Italian Balbo Bertone di Sambuy family descended in the female line from the Falcó.
