= Alessandro II Pico della Mirandola =

Italian nobleman

- Duke of Mirandola
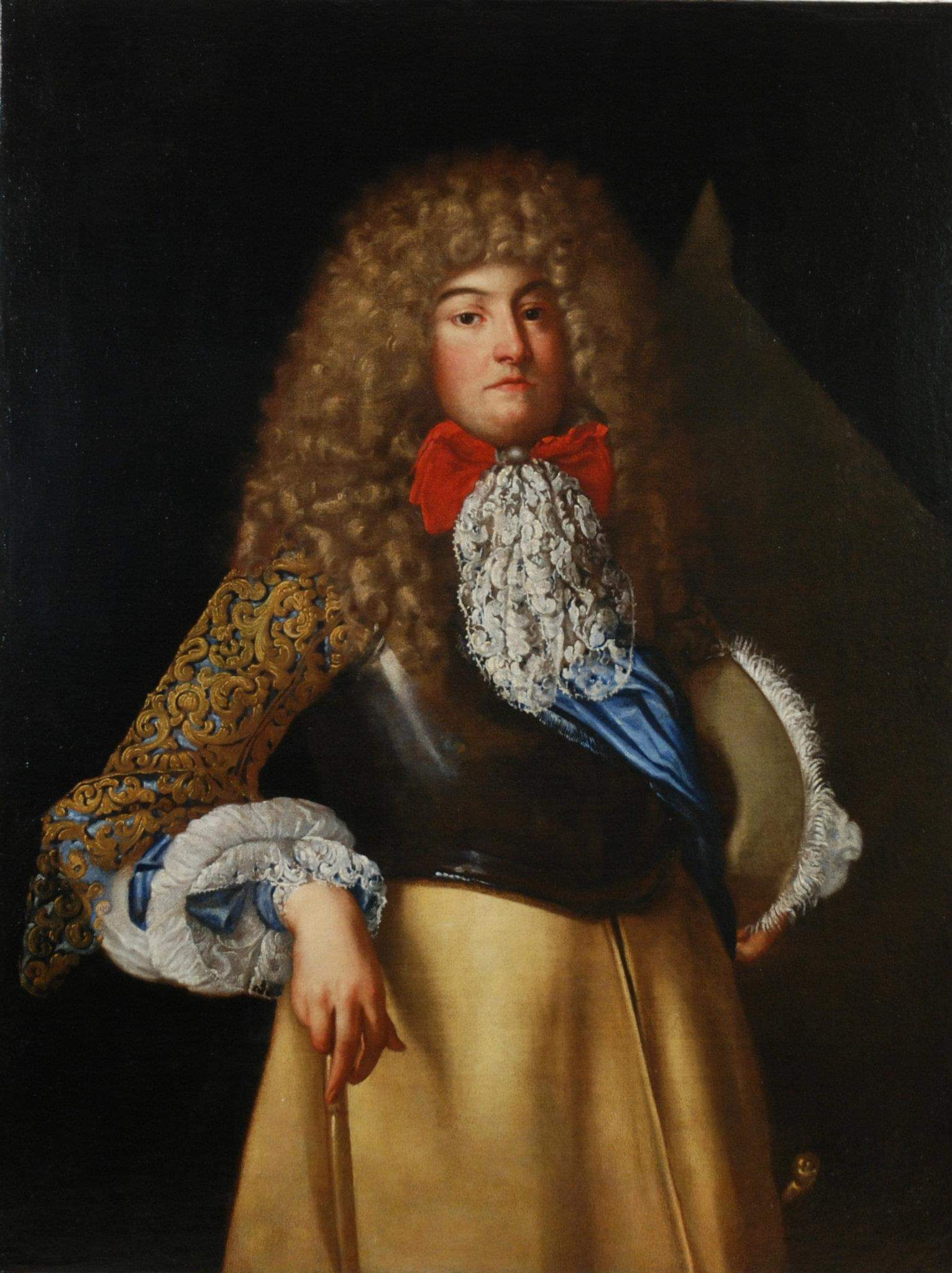

- Coat of arms
- Predecessor: Alessandro I Pico della Mirandola
- Successor: Francesco Maria Pico della Mirandola
- Other titles: Marquis of Concordia
- Born: 30 March 1631; Mirandola
- Died: 2 February 1691 (aged 59); Concordia sulla Secchia
- Buried: 1631; Church of St. Francis, Mirandola
- Noble family: Pico della Mirandola
- Spouse: Anna Beatrice d'Este (m. 1656)
- Father: Galeotto IV Pico della Mirandola
- Mother: Maria Cybo-Malaspina

Alessandro II Pico della Mirandola (Mirandola, 30 March 1631 – Concordia sulla Secchia, 2 February 1691) was an Italian nobleman, soldier and patron of the arts, second Duke of Mirandola and third Marquis of Concordia from 1637 until his death.

== Life ==
Son of Galeotto IV Pico della Mirandola and Maria Cybo-Malaspina (1609-1652), daughter of Carlo I Cybo-Malaspina, prince of Massa e marquis of Carrara. On 2 September 1637, at the age of 6, he inherited by her grandfather Alexander I's will the dominion of the Duchy of Mirandola, receiving confirmation of the investiture in 1641 from Emperor Ferdinand III. Due to his young age, the regency was entrusted to his mother and aunt Maria (1613-1682), who relinquished guardianship in 1648.

In 1666, at the Duchy of Milan, he was in the service of King Charles II of Spain, who knighted him with the Golden Fleece. At the request of Pope Clement IX, he left Mirandola to Venice, from where he set sail the following month for the island of Crete with 9 warships and 3,000 soldiers. After a stopover in Zakynthos, he landed in Candia on 23 August 1669 and joined the French, papal and Venetian forces in the Cretan War against the Ottomans, who had been besieging the Greek city for over twenty years. Alessandro II Pico was appointed field master of the papal troops. However, on 5 September 1669, the defenders of Candia had to sign the surrender to the Turks and were given the honours of war. Alessandro, suffering from malaria, returned to Mirandola where he was triumphantly welcomed.

He was a prince who loved the arts and had the church of Gesù e the church of the Servants of Mary. He had a library and an art gallery set up, modernised the castle of the Pico family, and paved all the streets of Mirandola. Alessandro Pico protected the arts: from painting (worthy of note is the gallery frescoed by Biagio Falcieri for the rich picture gallery that he set up through costly purchases) to music, calling Giovanni Battista Bassani to court. Finally, Alessandro tried to obtain the investiture of Mirandola as a bishopric, but to no avail.

On 29 April 1656 he married Anna Beatrice d'Este, daughter of Alfonso III, Duke of Modena and Isabella of Savoy, by whom he had nine children, in addition to two natural children.

- Maria Isabella Pico (1658–1732)
- Laura Pico (1660–1720), married Ferdinando II Gonzaga, Prince of Castiglione,
- Francesco Maria Pico (1661–1689), designated heir by his father, but predeceased him. Father of
  - Francesco Maria Pico (1688–1747), effective successor of Alexander II and last reigning Duke of Mirandola.
- Galeotto Pico (1663–1730), lord of San Martino Spino,
- Virginia Pico (1664– 1703), Sister Maria Beatrice,
- Fulvia Pico (1666–1691), married Tommaso d'Aquino, prince of Feroleto and Castiglione,
- Giovanni Pico (1667–1710), marquis of Quarantoli, had a natural son who was later legitimized :
  - Alessandro Pico (1705–1787), marquis of Quarantoli, abbot of San José de Benavides,
- Lodovico Pico della Mirandola (1668–1743), cardinal, patriarch of Constantinople, prefect of the Apostolic Palace,
- Alessandro Pico (1670–1711), Knight of Malta since 1685, Dominican monk since 1708.

Upon his death, he left the reign of the Duchy of Mirandola to his young grandson Francesco Maria II, entrusting its management to his sister Brigida Pico.

== Bibliography ==
- Bruno Andreolli (2015). "PICO, Alessandro II". PICO, Alessandro II in "Dizionario Biografico". Dizionario biografico degli italiani. Vol. 83.
- Pompeo Litta (1835). Famiglie celebri di Italia. Pico della Mirandola. Torino. [ISBN unspecified].
- Miroslav Marek. "Pico 2".
- Felice Ceretti (1880). Il viaggio di Alessandro II Pico all'isola di Candia. Narrazione di Gianfrancesco Piccinini. Vol. X. pp. 49–92.
- Felice Ceretti (1893). Carteggio del duca Alessandro II Pico con Monsignor Conte Uguccione Rangoni. Vol. XX.
- Felice Ceretti (1897). Trattato seguito nel 1665 fra il duca Carlo Emanuele II di Savoia ed il duca della Mirandola Alessandro II per la coltivazione di miniere. 4. Vol. VIII. pp. 129–131.
- Felice Ceretti (1907). Biografie pichensi. Vol. I. Mirandola. pp. 46–85.
- Memorie di un cuoco di Casa Pico. Banchetti, cerimoniali e ospitalità di una corte al suo tramonto. Mirandola. 2002.
- Cronaca della Mirandola di Giovan Francesco Piccinini (1682-1720). La fine di un ducato nelle memorie del chirurgo di corte. Mirandola. 2010.

== See also ==
- Castle of the Pico
- Church of Gesù, Mirandola
- Cretan War (1645–1669)
- Duchy of Mirandola
- Mirandola Mint
