= Castello a Mare =

Coordinates: 40°39′N 17°58′E

Aragon Gate, Castello a Mare, Palermo.

Castello a Mare or Castellammare (pronounced [kaˌstɛllamˈmaːre]) is an ancient fortress that guarded the entrance to the port at Palermo in La Cala. Extensive remains are visible, some of which are open to the public. There is a Norman keep, a fortified gate or entrance, and remains of a sophisticated Renaissance star-shaped defence.

The fortress gave its name to the city's historical district of Castellammare.

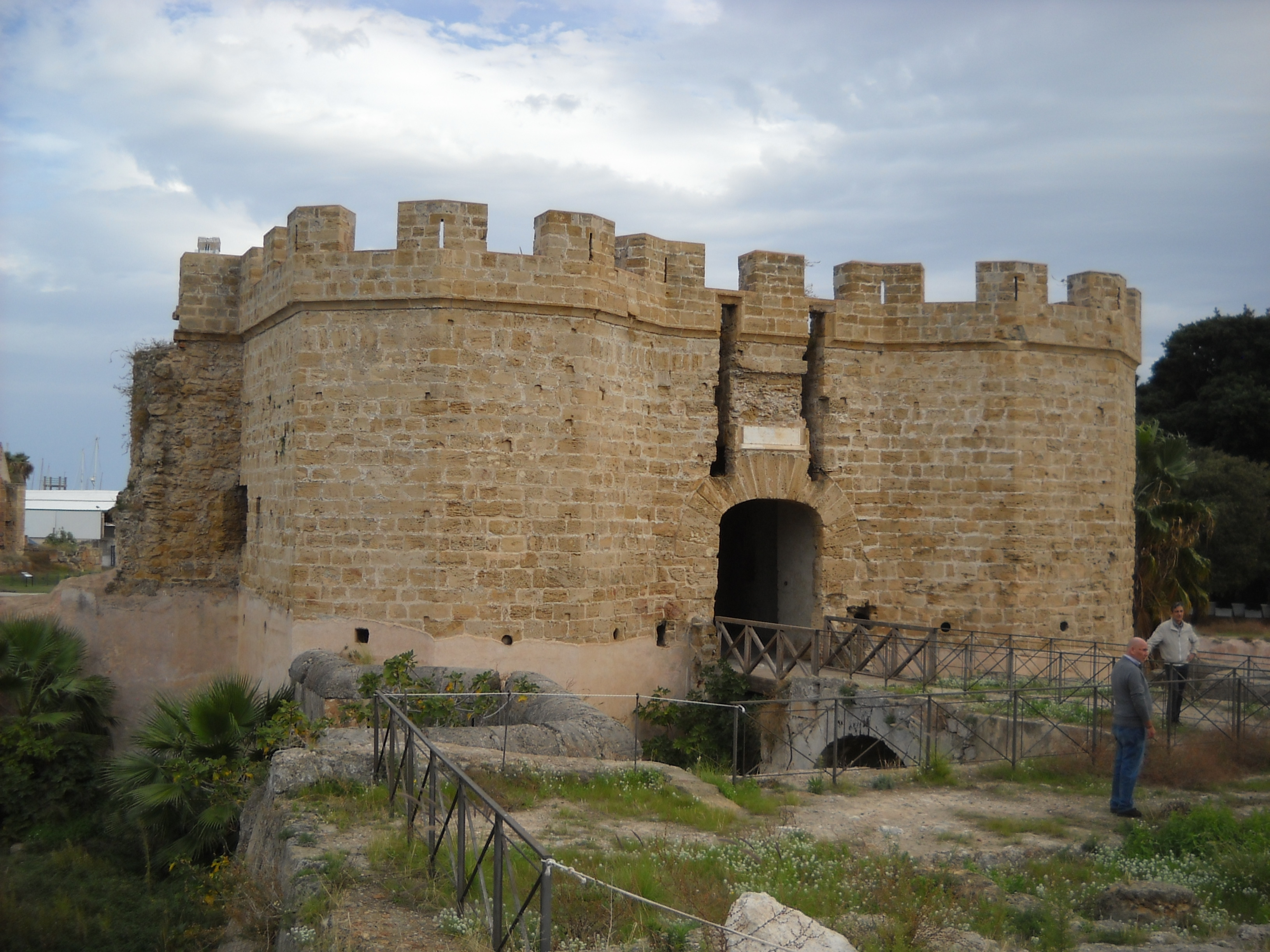

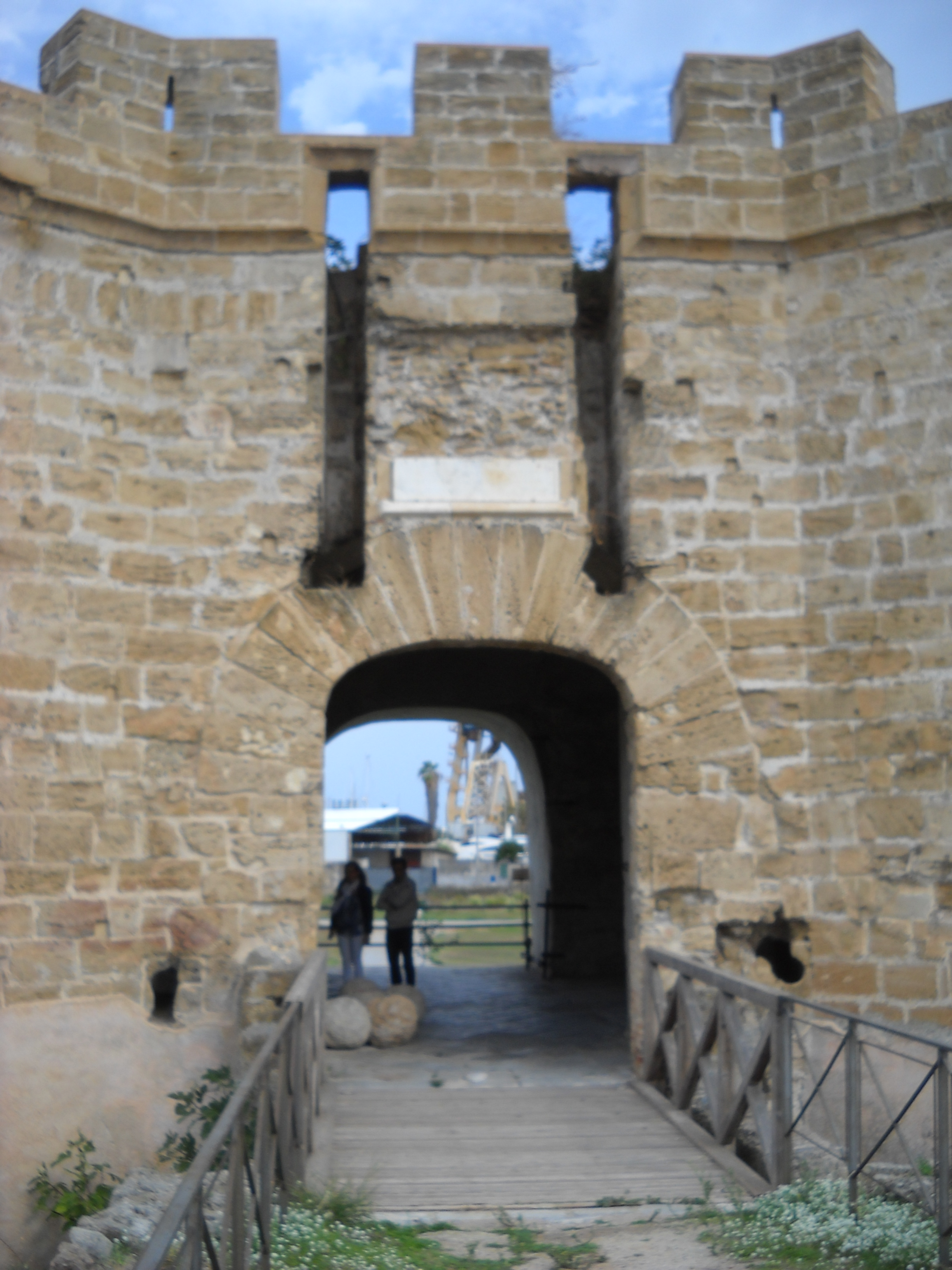

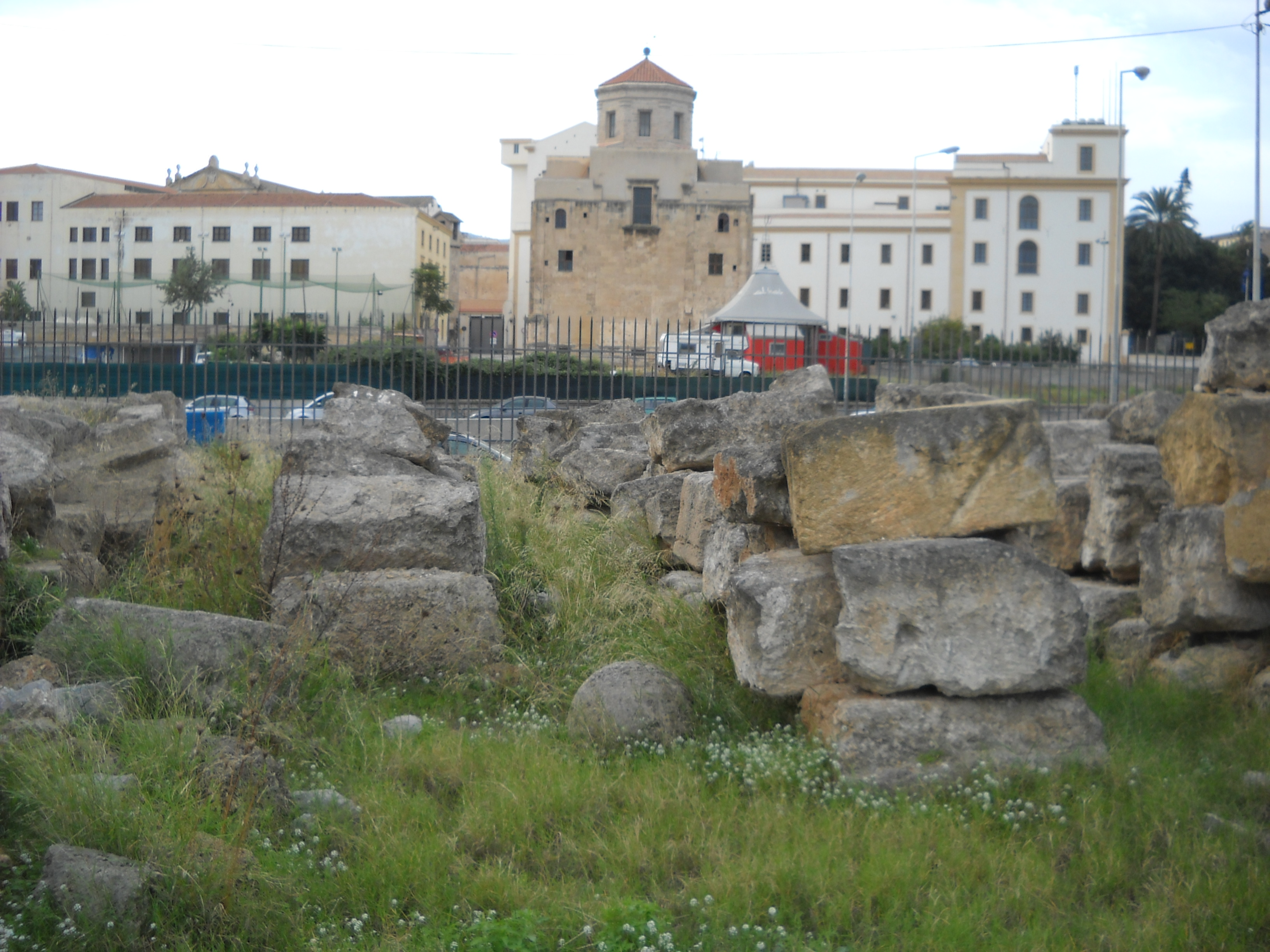
