= Duke of Nochera =

Dukedom of Spain

Dukedom of Nochera
- Creation date: 10 August 1656
- Created by: Philip IV
- Peerage: Peerage of Spain
- First holder: Francisco de Moura Corterreal y Melo, 1st Duke of Nochera
- Present holder: Filippo Balbo Bertone di Sambuy, 12th Duke of Nochera

Duke of Nochera (Spanish: Duque de Nochera; Italian: Duca di Nocera) is a hereditary title in the Peerage of Spain, accompanied by the dignity of Grandee. Originally styled "Duca di Nocera", it was granted in 1656 by Philip IV to Francisco de Moura Corterreal, Viceroy of Sardinia and Catalonia and governor of the Spanish Netherlands. The title made reference to the town of Nocera dei Pagani, in the Kingdom of Naples, subjected to Spain at the time.

== History ==
The ducal fief of Nocera was created for the first time in December 1521 by Emperor Charles V in his prerogatives as King of Spain and Naples, and was sold for 50.000 ducats to Tiberio Carafa della Stadera (?–1527), one of the many members of the noble House of Carafa. The title was descendible in the legitimate male line and remained in the possession of Tiberio's descendants until 1648, when, upon the death without legitimate sons of Francesco Maria Domenico Carafa (after 1616–1648), it was reincorporated into the Royal Treasury of the Kingdom Naples.

The title was subsequently created for a second time in 1659 when it was bestowed upon aforesaid General Moura. This time, in accordance with Spanish law, the title was also descendible in the female line (of course in the absence of legitimate sons). Thus, when Moura died without male issue in 1675, he was succeeded, in order, by his daughters Eleanor, who in turn died without surviving issue in 1706, and Juana, who was first married to Italian Giberto Pio di Savoia (ca 1637–1676), Prince of San Gregorio. Few months after her succession, however, following the conquest of the Kingdom of Naples by the Habsbourgs in 1707, Juana was stripped of her titles for "felony", having refused to render homage to the new King Charles III (later to become Holy Roman Emperor under the name of Charles VI) and in 1709 her pro-Habsburg second-born son Luigi Pio di Savoia was invested with the duchy of Nocera in her stead, taking effective possession of it. When Juana died in 1717, she was nominally succeeded, according to Spanish law, by her eldest son Francesco Pio di Savoia, who had meanwhile gained a prominent place in the Spanish Bourbon court, and subsequently, on the latter's death in 1723, by his son Giberto (called in Spain Gisberto Pío de Saboya y Spínola), but the duchy effectively remained in Luigi's possession according to Austrian law then still in force in the Kingdom of Naples.

In 1734, however, the Kingdom was again conquered, this time by the Infante of Spain, Don Carlos, and, the following year, the 1707 confiscation of Juana's titles was annulled and the same, including the duchy of Nocera, were reincorporated into the Pio di Savoia majorat with Gisberto as its titular. No further opposition was offered by Luigi, at the time the Austrian ambassador in Venice, who had no legitimate children and of whom Gisberto was the legal heir as well.

When Gisberto too died childless in 1776, the title passed to his sister Isabel, married in second marriage to Antonio José Valcárcel y Pérez Pastor, and then to her Valcárcel descendants. At the death with no issue of her grandson Antonio Valcárcel y Pascual de Pobil, the 8th Duke, in 1824, the dukedom became extinct until it was rehabilitated by Alfonso XIII in 1922 under the name of "Duque de Nochera", on behalf of Alfonso Falcó y De La Gandara, great-great-grandson in the female line of the 7th Duke Antonio Valcárcel y Pío de Saboya.

As the Falcó family too died out in 1970, the title has passed to a line of the Italian Balbo Bertone di Sambuy family, also descended from the 7th duke.

== Dukes of Nocera ==
=== 1521 ===
- Tiberio Carafa (1521-1527)
- Ferdinando I Carafa (1527-1558)
- Alfonso Carafa (1558-1581)
- Ferdinando II Carafa (1581-1593
- Francesco Maria Carafa (1593-1642)
- Francesco Maria Domenico Carafa (1642-1648)

=== 1659 ===
- Francisco de Moura Corterreal y Melo, 1st Duke of Nocera (1610-1675)
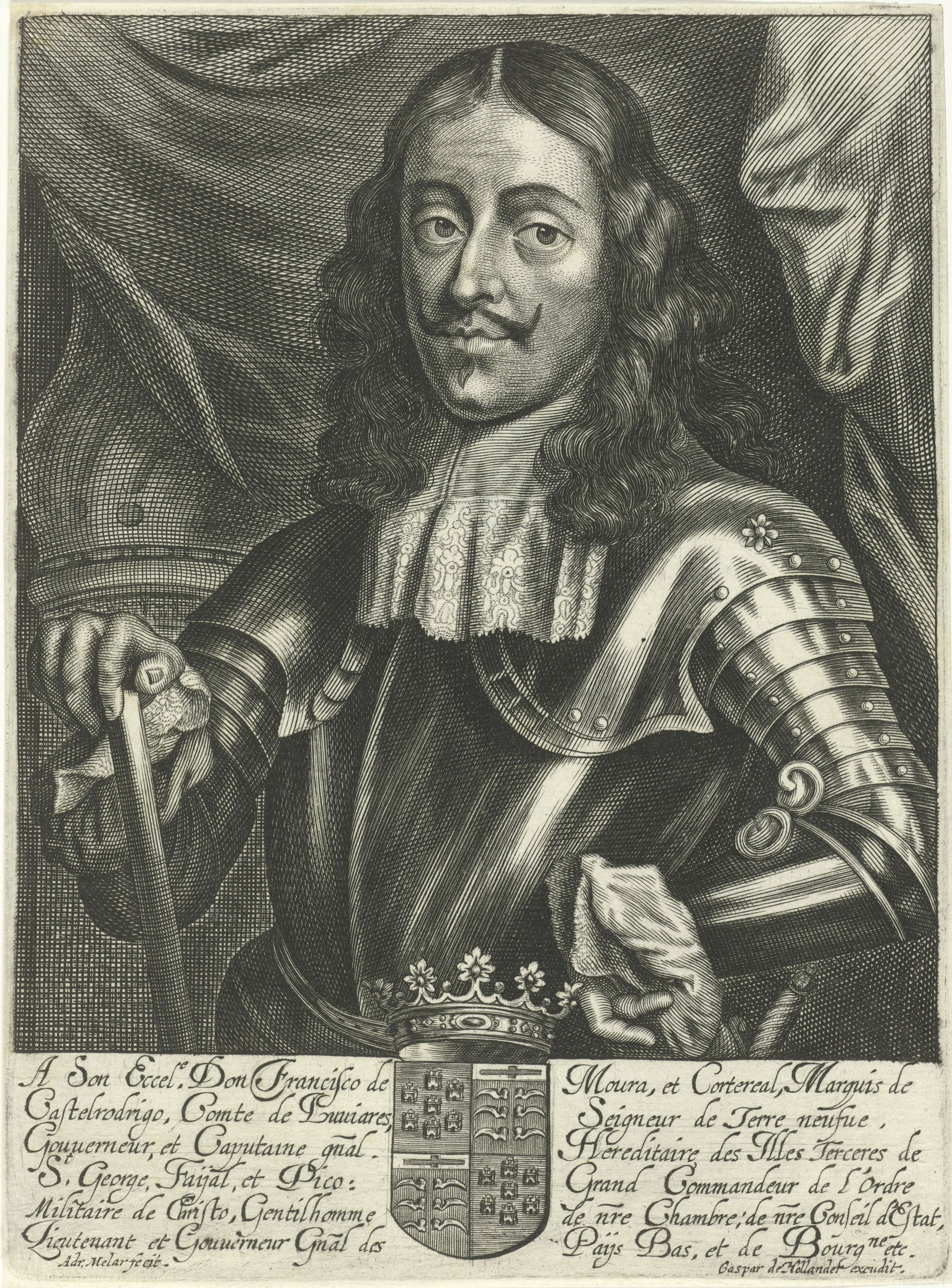
  Lithography of the 1st Duke
- Leonor de Moura y Moncada de Aragón, 2nd Duchess of Nocera (d. 1706), daughter of the 1st Duke
- Juana de Moura y Moncada de Aragón, 3rd Duchess of Nocera (1650-1717), sister of the 2nd Duchess, dispossessed of her titles in 1707 according to Austrian law then in force in the Kingdom of Naples
  - Luigi Pio di Savoia, 4th Duke of Nocera from 1709 to 1735 according to Austrian law then in force in the Kingdom of Naples, second-born son of the dispossessed 3rd Duchess
- Francisco Pío de Saboya y Moura, 4th Duke of Nocera, pretender according to Spanish law (1672-1723), eldest son of the 3rd Duchess
- Gisberto Pío de Saboya y Spínola, 5th Duke of Nocera (1717–1776), son of the 4th Duke, pretender until 1735, effective thereafter
- Isabel María Pío de Saboya y Spínola, 6th Duchess of Nocera (1719-1799), sister of the 5th Duke
- Antonio Valcárcel y Pío de Saboya, 7th Duke of Nochera (1748-1808), son of the 6th Duchess
- Antonio Valcárcel y Pascual de Pobil, 8th Duke of Nochera (1772-1824), son of the 7th Duke

=== 1922 ===
- Alfonso Falcó y de la Gándara, 9th Duke of Nochera (1903-1967), great-great-grandson of the 7th Duke
- María Asunción Falcó y de la Gándara, 10th Duchess of Nochera (1883-1971), sister of the 9th Duke
- Carlo Ernesto Balbo Bertone di Sambuy, 11th Duke of Nochera (1916-2003), first cousin once removed of the 9th Duke and 10th Duchess
- Filippo Balbo Bertone di Sambuy, 12th Duke of Nochera (b. 1956), son of the 11th Duke

== See also ==
- List of dukes in the peerage of Spain
- List of current grandees of Spain
