= Carlo Pio di Savoia =

Italian cardinal

His Eminence Carlo Pio di Savoia
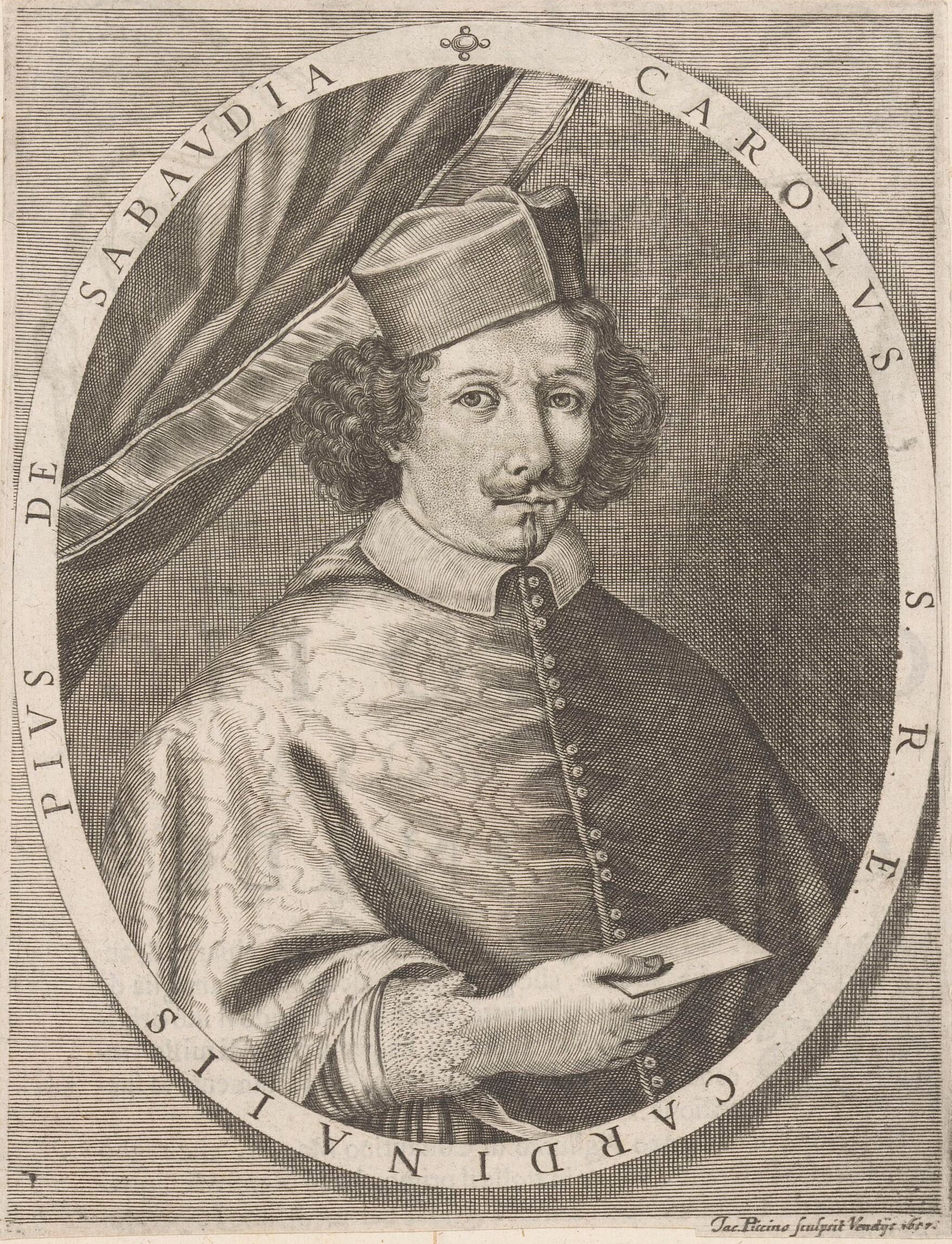
- Church: Catholic Church

Orders
- Consecration: 5 Sep 1655 by Giambattista Spada

Personal details
- Born: 7 April 1622
- Died: 13 February 1689 (age 66)
- Coat of arms

Carlo Pio di Savoia (7 April 1622 – 13 February 1689) was an Italian Catholic Cardinal of the Pio di Savoia family. He was the nephew of Cardinal Carlo Emanuele Pio di Savoia.

== Early life ==
Pio was born 7 April 1622, the son of Ascanio Pio di Savoia and Eleonora Mattei.

At age 17, Pio went to Rome and then travelled throughout Europe until 1641. Thereafter, he joined the army of the Duke of Ferrara as a colonel but was captured by the Florentines in Moncessino. He was released at the end of the war and was appointed treasurer-general of the Apostolic Chamber in 1650. Two years later, he bought a position (as was the custom) as personal treasurer to Pope Innocent X.

On 5 Sep 1655, he was consecrated bishop by Giambattista Spada, Cardinal-Priest of Santa Susanna, with Carlo Nembrini, Bishop of Parma, and Giacomo Theodoli, Bishop of Forlì, serving as co-consecrators.

== Ecclesiastic career ==
On 2 March 1654, he was elevated to cardinal by Pope Innocent and was appointed Cardinal-deacon of the church of Santa Maria in Domnica. Over the subsequent two decades, he was appointed to various churches as Cardinal-deacon and Cardinal-priest including:

- Cardinal-deacon of Sant'Eustachio (11 February 1664)
- Cardinal-priest of Santa Prisca (14 November 1667)
- Cardinal-priest of San Crisogono (28 January 1675)
- Cardinal-priest of S. Maria in Trastevere (1 December 1681)
- Cardinal-bishop of Sabina (15 February 1683)

Between 1673 and his death in 1689, he served as Cardinal-protector of Austria.

== Sources ==
- Baroni, Pier Giovanni (1969). Un cardinale del Seicento: Carlo Emanuele Pio di Savoia (in Italian). Bologna: Ponte nuovo.
- Cardella, Lorenzo (1793). Memorie storiche de'cardinali della santa Romana chiesa (in Italian). Vol. VII. Roma: Pagliarini. pp. 115–118.

Catholic Church titles
Preceded by Lorenzo Raggi	Cardinal-Deacon of Santa Maria in Domnica; 1654–1664	Succeeded by Sigismondo Chigi
Preceded by Francesco Maria Macchiavelli	Bishop of Ferrara; 1655–1663	Succeeded by Giovanni Stefano Donghi
Preceded by Lorenzo Raggi	Cardinal-Deacon of Sant'Eustachio; 1664–1667	Succeeded by Friedrich von Hessen-Darmstadt
Preceded by Giulio Gabrielli	Cardinal-Priest of Santa Prisca; 1667–1675	Succeeded by Alessandro Crescenzi
Preceded by Giambattista Spada	Cardinal-Priest of San Crisogono; 1675–1681	Succeeded by Paluzzo Paluzzi Altieri Degli Albertoni
Preceded by Francesco Albizzi	Cardinal-Priest of Santa Maria in Trastevere; 1681–1683	Succeeded by Decio Azzolini (iuniore)
Preceded by Pietro Vito Ottoboni	Cardinal-Bishop of Sabina; 1683–1689	Succeeded by Paluzzo Paluzzi Altieri Degli Albertoni
