= Pio di Savoia =

Italian noble family, 14th - 17th century

Coat of arms of the Pio family

The Pio family, later Pio di Savoia, an ancient noble Italian family, was first mentioned by good authorities in the 14th century. After having long contended for the city of Modena with the House of Este, in 1336 they eventually agreed to renounce it, on condition that they retained the smaller domain of Carpi for themselves. They maintained control of Carpi for nearly 200 years and later acquired the minor fiefs of Sassuolo, Meldola, and Sarsina, etc. Many members of the family were distinguished as condottieri, diplomats or ecclesiastics.

In 1450 Alberto II Pio (1418–1463) obtained from the house of Savoy, for himself, his brothers and their descendants, the privilege of adding the style "di Savoia" to their surname, as a reward for his military services. His grand-son, also named Alberto (Alberto III Pio di Savoia), who served as Imperial and later French ambassador in Rome, won fame as a man of learning, but in 1525 he was stripped of the county of Carpi for "felony" by Emperor Charles V. Alberto's nephew, Cardinal Rodolfo Pio was a trusted adviser to Paul III and helped to establish the Inquisition at Milan. The main branch of the family (the so called "Alberto line") died out in the early seventeenth century with the assassination in Venice of the cardinal's nephew, also called Rodolfo, after the latter had been forced in 1597 to sell the last family fiefdoms within the Papal States.

Another branch of the family, called "Giberto line" after one of Albert II's brothers, renounced in 1499 the coregency over the lordship of Carpi in favour of Ercole I d'Este, Duke of Ferrara, and accepted in exchange the Este fief of Sassuolo. They held the domain of Sassuolo until 1599 when the fief was again illegitimately confiscated by the House of Este. Ascanio Pio (1587–1649), the heir to this branch of the family, was a dramatic poet of some merit. His son, Cardinal Carlo Pio purchased from the pope the title of prince of San Gregorio in order to increase the prestige of the family. Carlo's half-brother Giberto Pio (ca 1637–1676), who had inherited the principality, soon moved to Spain, where, through his marriage to Juana de Moura Corte Real y Moncada (mid 17th century–1717), he also acquired for his descendants the merely nominal marquis title of Castelo Rodrigo, and the effective one of the Dukedom of Nocera (referring to the locality of Nocera de' Pagani in the Kingdom of Naples at the time under Spain). In 1720, the title of Grandee was conferred upon his son Francisco Pío de Saboya y Moura, erstwhile Governor of Madrid and Captain General of Catalonia. The Príncipe Pío hill and the Príncipe Pío multimodal train station in Madrid are named after them. The Spanish noble titles of 'Nochera' and Castelo Rodrigo with Grandeeship are still in force in the 21st century and are held by the Italian family Balbo Bertone di Sambuy, descended in the female line from the Spanish branch of the Pio di Savoia.

A third branch of the family, called "Galasso line" after another of Alberto II's brothers—which was forcibly excluded from the coregency over Carpi in 1469—, is still flourishing in Rome, the UK and the US. In the second half of the 19th century this branch of the family sued the Kingdom of Italy as the legal successor of the Este States, and succeeded in exacting a conspicuous compensation of 50,000 gold florins for the unfair seizure of the fiefdom of Carpi by the Este family, in violation of the aforementioned 1336 "Sovereign-to-Sovereign" agreement. In 1930 the King of Italy Victor Emmanuel III of Savoy again bestowed upon Don Manfredo, head of the Galasso family line, the title of Prince Pio di Savoia.
