= Gennari =

Gennari Family
- Origin: Rome, Italy
- Titles: Marquess
- Cadet branches: Gennari, Gennari Curlo, Gennari D'Antony, Gennari Santori.

The Gennari family is an ancient Italian noble family with roots tracing back to the Middle Ages, with documented mentions of the family dating as far back as the 13th century. Originating from Rome and present in many Italian regions, particularly Emilia-Romagna (Parma, Modena, Bologna, and Cento) and with branches in Turin, Genova, and Valle Vigezzo, the Gennari family has made significant contributions to various fields, including art, architecture, and cultural patronage.

== Branches ==
=== Gennari Curlo ===
A branch of the Gennari family is the Gennari Curlo line. The Gennari Curlo family from Turin (branch from Genova), and the Curlo family now resident in Cuneo and Taggia (branch from Taggia), are the last descendants of the Curlo family. In 1911, the "Elenco uofficiale della nobilta Italiana" distinguishes five branches of the family, with the senior branch patricians (nobles) of Genoa, and the other two nobles of Taggia. This brand descends from the Curlo family, which is the name of one of the oldest Italian noble families with the titles of Marquess, and patricians of Ventimiglia, Taggia and Genoa.

=== Gennari D'Antony ===
One of the notable branches of the Gennari family is the Gennari D'Antony line. The Gennari family (from De Zanarijs, Genari, Gennari) has been present in the register of Vigezzini nobles since 1354 and moved to Santa Maria Maggiore in 1702 with Giovanni Battista Zenar. The Villa Gennari D'Antony was built in the last decade of the nineteenth century, commissioned by a distinguished benefactor of local works, G.B. Gennari.

=== Bolognese School and Guercino ===
The Gennari family had close ties with the renowned painter Guercino, also known as Giovanni Francesco Barbieri, who was associated with the Bolognese School of painting. The Bolognese School, a prominent artistic movement in Bologna during the 16th and 17th centuries, emphasized naturalistic techniques and emotional expression in art.

Several members of the Gennari family, such as Benedetto Gennari, Benedetto Gennari II, Ercole Gennari, Bartolomeo Gennari, and Cesare Gennari, were painters associated with the Bolognese School. They contributed significantly to the development and flourishing of this artistic movement through their exceptional artistic skills and contributions to the field of painting.

- Benedetto Gennari was a renowned painter of the Bolognese School, known for his religious and mythological works. His artistic style combined elements of classicism with vibrant colors and dynamic compositions. His notable artworks include "The Conversion of St. Paul" and "The Martyrdom of St. Peter."
- Benedetto Gennari II followed in his father's footsteps and became a prominent painter of the Bolognese School. He specialized in portraiture and was highly regarded for his ability to capture the likeness and personality of his subjects. His notable works include portraits of noble individuals and religious figures.
- Ercole Gennari was another talented member of the Gennari family who excelled in painting. He was known for his skill in creating beautiful and delicate still-life compositions. His artworks often featured floral arrangements, fruits, and other objects meticulously rendered with exquisite detail.
- Bartolomeo Gennari was a painter of the Bolognese School who specialized in genre scenes and historical subjects. His paintings showcased lively narratives and engaging characters, capturing everyday life and historical events with vividness and expression.
- Cesare Gennari was a painter and art dealer associated with the Bolognese School. He was known for his ability to create atmospheric landscapes and architectural backgrounds in his paintings. His works often incorporated mythological or biblical themes, creating a harmonious blend of nature and narrative.

=== Gennari of Rome ===
The Gennari family also established a presence in Rome, where it originated, and where they became known for their architectural contributions and artistic patronage. The family has given rise to two branches: Gennari Santori and Gennari. Notable members of the Gennari branch include:

==== Ugo Gennari ====
Ugo Gennari (born 1883, Rome) was an esteemed architect known for his innovative architectural designs and contributions to urban planning in Rome. Ugo was the president of the Order of the Architects from 1946 to 1951. Some of his most significant works include Villa Sciarra renovation. Ugo Gennari designed the Fontana Belvedere, a notable fountain located in Villa Sciarra, Rome.

==== Enrico Gennari ====
Enrico Gennari (Rome, 1846 - Rome, 1915) left a lasting impact on the architectural heritage of Rome through his involvement in the restoration and refurbishment of the Casina delle Civette, a remarkable building located within Villa Torlonia, among others.

==== Remigio Gennari ====
Remigio Gennari (Rome, 1945 - Rome, 2005) was a renowned art collector and gained recognition as one of the most prominent European toy soldiers collectors. His extensive collection is partially exhibited permanently at the Museo Storico dell'Arma di Cavalleria in the Piedmont region

==== Other notable members ====
Gennari Notable people with the surname include:

- Alessia Gennari (born 1991), Italian female volleyball player
- Bartolomeo Gennari (1594–1661), Italian Renaissance painter
- Benedetto Gennari (1563–1658), Italian painter of the early-Baroque period
- Benedetto Gennari II (1633–1715), Italian painter active during the Baroque period
- Casimiro Gennari (Maratea, 27 December 1839 – Rome, 31 January 1914), was an Italian Cardinal. Casimiro Gennari's notable achievements include his appointment as Archbishop of Lepanto by Pope Leo XIII on 6 February 1897 and his elevation to cardinal with the title of San Marcello on 15 April 1901. He worked closely with Pope Pius X, collaborating on the codification of canon law. This work began with the approval of Pius X through the motu proprio Arduum sane munus on 19 March 1904, and was completed three years after Casimiro Gennari's death. Casimiro Gennari dedicated the remaining years of his life to his work on codifying canon law. He also served as the prefect of the Holy Congregation of the council and continued to direct the Monitore. [^1^]
- Cesare Gennari (1637–1688), Italian painter of the Baroque period
- Egidio Gennari (1876–1942), Italian politician
- Enrico Gennari (born 1977), Italian marine biologist
- Ercole Gennari (1597–1658), Italian Renaissance drawer and painter
- Francesco Gennari (1750–1797), Italian anatomist
- Lina Gennari (1911–1997), Italian actress and operetta singer
- Lorenzo Gennari (1595–1665/1672), Italian Renaissance painter
- Marco Antonio Gennari (born 1992), Italian rugby union player
- Mattia Gennari (born 1991), Italian footballer
- Mirco Gennari (born 1966), Sammarinese former footballer
- Paolo Gennari (1908–1968), Italian rower
- Patrizio Gennari (1820–1897), Italian botanist
- Tony Gennari (born 1942), Italian-American former professional basketball player

== See also ==
- Line of Gennari, also called the "band" or "stria" of Gennari
- Still-Gennari reaction

== Bibliography ==
- Libro d'Oro della Nobiltà Italiana, Collegio Araldico, 2000–2004.
- Enciclopedia Storico-Nobiliare Italiana, V. Spreti, 1928–1936.
- Nuova istoria della republica di Genova, Michel-Giuseppe Canale, Firenze, Felice le Monier, 1860.
- Treccani enciclopedia.
