= Bourbon =

Bourbon is a word deriving mainly from the Bourbons (House of Bourbon), a royal family from the historical Bourbonnais province in France.

Bourbon may also refer to:

== Food and drink ==
- Bourbon whiskey, an American whiskey made using a corn-based mash
- Bourbon, a beer produced by Brasseries de Bourbon
- Bourbon biscuit, a chocolate sandwich biscuit
- Bourbon coffee, a type of coffee made from a cultivar of Coffea arabica
- Bourbon vanilla, a cultivar of vanilla

== Places ==
- Bourbon, Indiana, United States
- Bourbon, Missouri, United States
- Bourbon, Boone County, Missouri
- Bourbon County, Kentucky, United States
- Bourbon County, Kansas, United States
- Bourbon Street, a street in New Orleans, Louisiana, United States
- Bourbon-l'Archambault, Allier département, France
- Bourbon-Lancy, Saône-et-Loire département, France
- Bourbonne-les-Bains, Haute-Marne département, France
- The Bourbonnais, a historical province of France
- Île Bourbon, former name for the Island of Réunion

== Politics and history ==
- House of Bourbon, French and Spanish royal dynasties
  - Spanish royal family
- Duke of Bourbon, a title in the peerage of France
- Bourbon Reforms, a series of measures taken by the Spanish Crown
- Bourbon Restoration, the return to monarchs in the Bourbon Dynasty in France and Spain
- Bourbon Triumvirate, politicians who dominated Georgia politics rotating between the governorship and the two U.S. Senate seats: Joseph E. Brown, Alfred H. Colquitt, and John B. Gordon
- Bourbon Democrat, from 1876 to 1904 a conservative member of the US Democratic Party
- Palais Bourbon: meeting place of the French National Assembly

== Other uses ==
- USS Bourbon, a frigate
- Bourbon virus, a tick-borne virus discovered in the summer of 2014
- Bourbon (horse) (foaled in 1774), a British Thoroughbred racehorse
- "Bourbon" (Morgan Griffiths song), 2025
- "Bourbon", a 2019 song by Chad Brownlee from Back in the Game
- "Bourbon", a 2024 song by Megan Thee Stallion from Megan: Act II
- Mihono Bourbon, a Japanese Thoroughbred racehorse

== See also ==
- Barbon, a village in Cumbria, England
- Bhurban, a small town and a hill station in Punjab province, Pakistan
- Bourbonism (disambiguation)
- Borbon (disambiguation)
- Constable de Bourbon (disambiguation)
- Bourbon Kid, a supernatural horror book series by an anonymous British author
