= Ficatelli =

Ficatelli or Figatelli is an Italian surname. Notable people with the surname include:

- Giuseppe Maria Figatelli (1611–1682), Italian mathematician
- Giuseppe Maria Ficatelli (1639–1703), Italian painter
- Stefano Felice Ficatelli (1686–1771), Italian painter
