= Santa Maria Addolorata, Cento =

Church in Cento, Italy

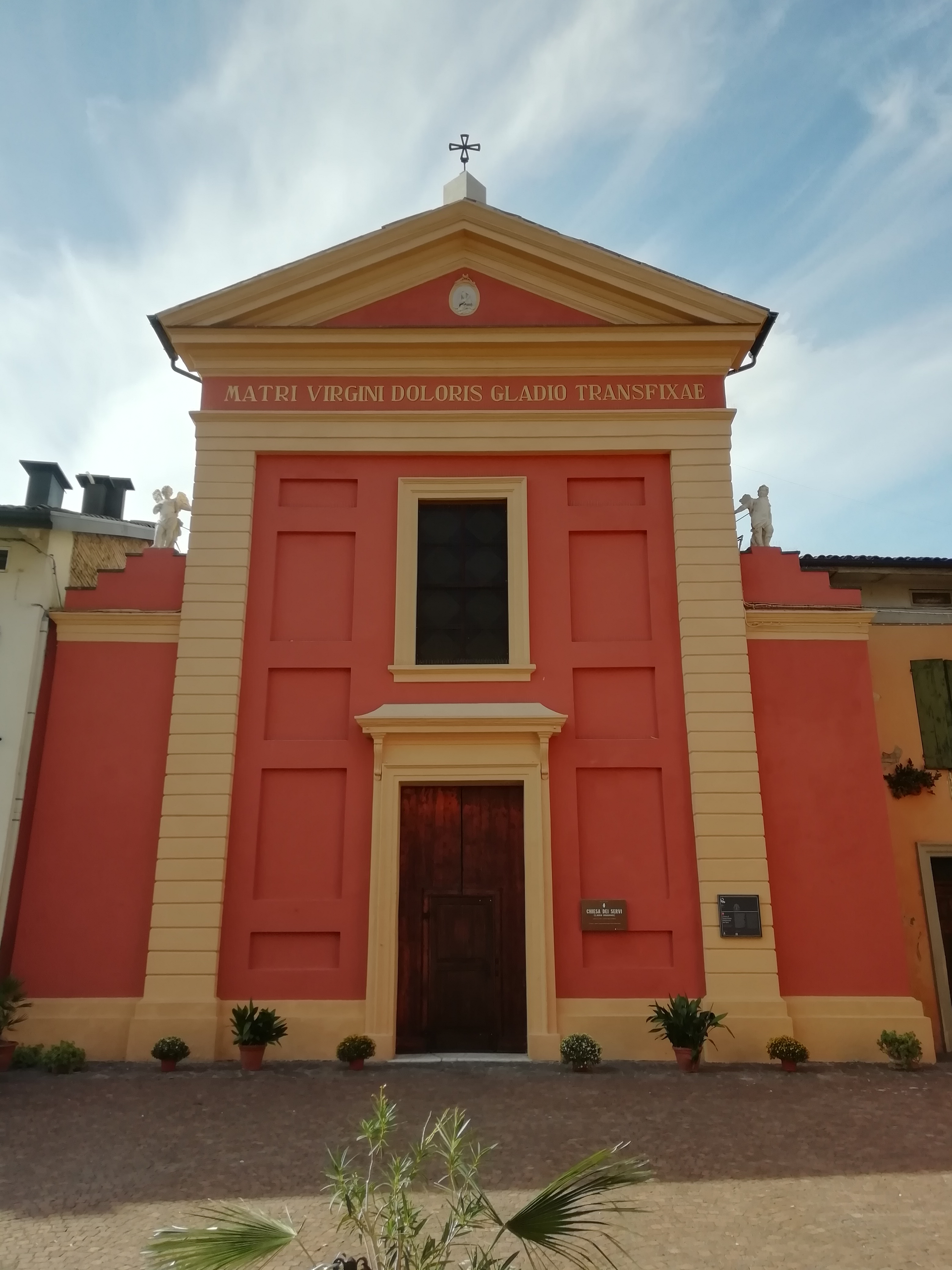
Church of Santa Maria Addolorata, Cento

Santa Maria Addolorata, also called the Chiesa dei Servi is a Renaissance style, Roman Catholic church located on Via Gennari in Cento, Province of Ferrara, region of Emilia-Romagna, Italy.

== History ==
Construction of the church began in 1590 (436 years ago) commissioned by the Servite order of Ferrara. They remained attached to the church until 1652. For many years, the church was maintained by the Compagnia detta “ del Sacco “ instituted in 1641 by the Capuchin friar Giovanni da Sestola.

Five of the altars are decorated with major paintings by Guercino, Cesare Gennari, and other Baroque era artists. Guercino also painted a Sudarium carried by Angels. portato dagli angeli". Denys Calvaert painted the Archangel Michael. Lorenzo Gennari painted a St Francis receives Stigmata. One of the chapels now has a copy of Guercino's "St Carlo Borromeo in prayer".

Due to the 2012 Northern Italy earthquakes, the church is closed for restoration.
