= Santa Maria Maddalena, Cento =

Catholic church in Emilia-Romagna region, Italy

Coordinates: 44°43′43.8″N 11°17′15.2″E

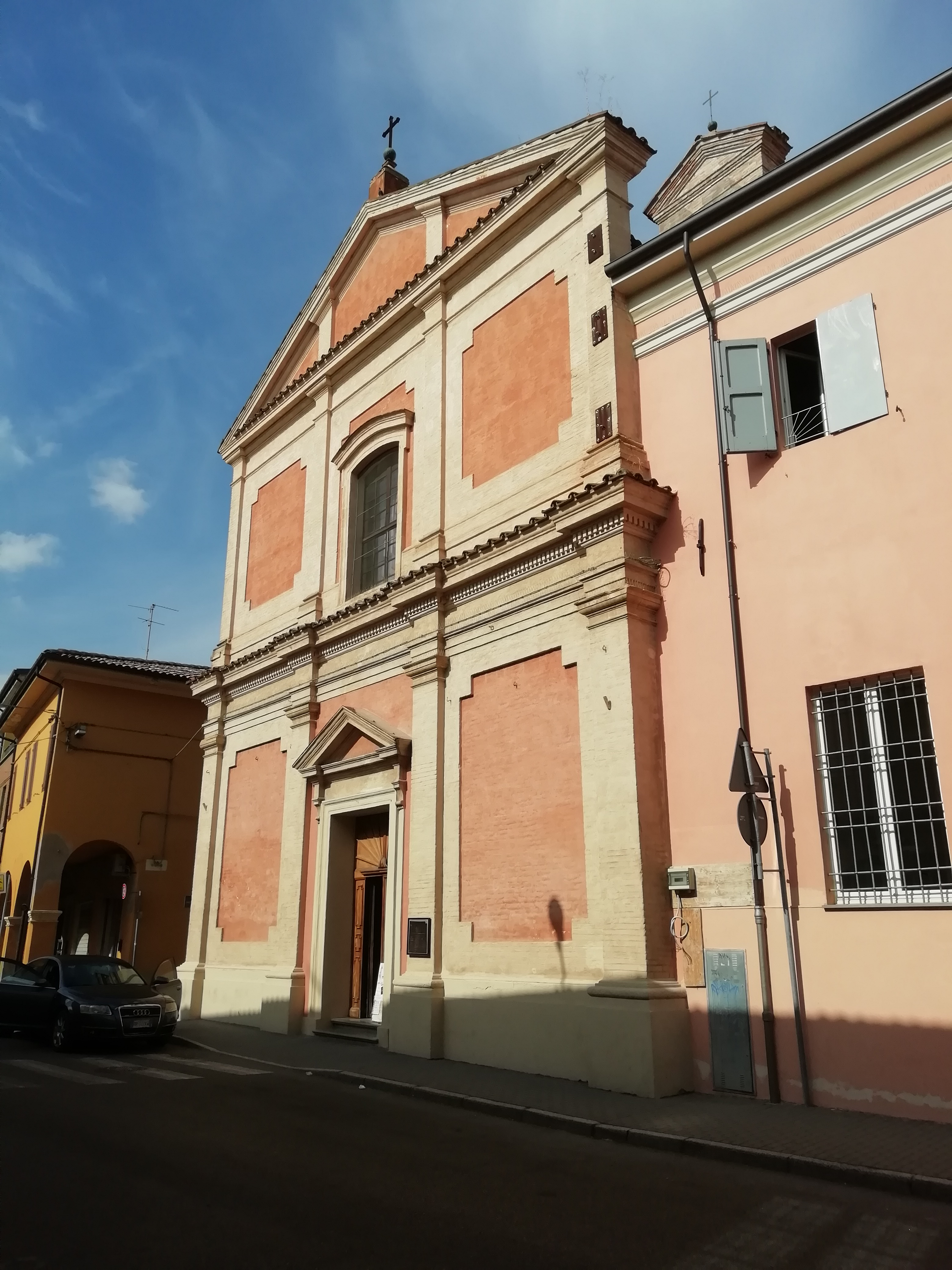

Santa Maria Maddalena is a Baroque style, Roman Catholic church located on Via Matteotti in Cento, Region of Emilia-Romagna, Italy.

== History ==
The church has an octagonal layout, and was once adjacent to a monastery of Augustinian nuns. The facade was erected in 1661–1662. The main altar has a canvas depicting the Penitent Magdalen by Cesare Gennari.

The side chapels have lateral chapels with a painting depicting "Santa Teresa d’Avila and Sant’Apollonia" by Benedetto Gennari junior and an 18th-century statue of the "Madonna di Loreto".
