= Neo-Bourbonism =

Italian political movement

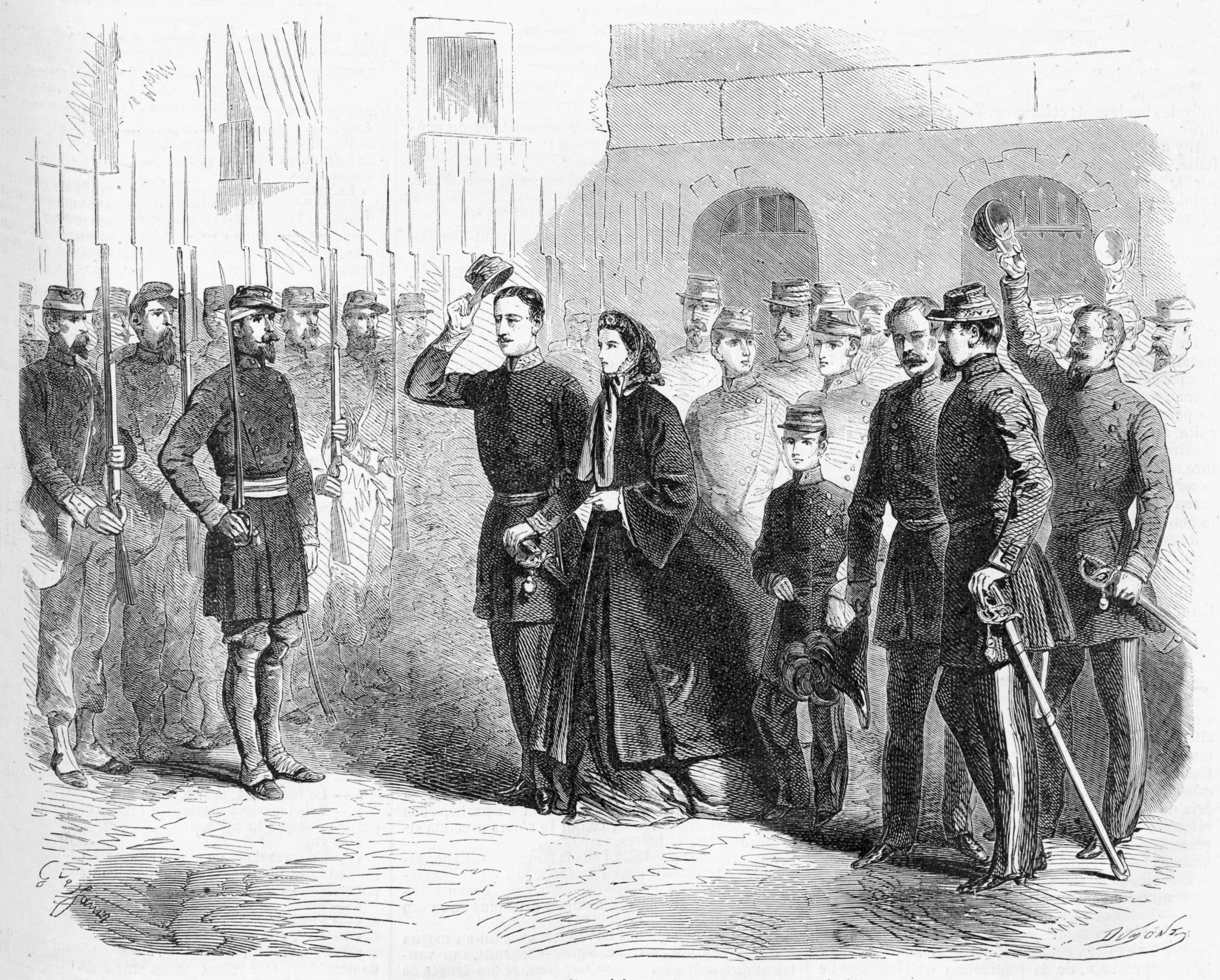
Francis II of Bourbon greets the Gaeta garrison

Neo-Bourbonism (Italian: Neoborbonismo) is a form of nostalgia for the Kingdom of the Two Sicilies. While the movement was born already in the immediate years after the conquest of Southern Italy by Giuseppe Garibaldi in the Expedition of the Thousand, after which the Kingdom of the Two Sicilies collapsed and ceased to exist, it was a small movement politcally to restore the previous rulers of the House of Bourbon-Two Sicilies and more used from the political Catholic opposition to the newfounded Kingdom of Italy because of its stance and hostility, and soon afterwards conquest and occupation in 1870, towards the Papal States and its anti-clerical policies. Already in 1878 the journalist Leone Carpi expressed his doubts about the danger of a real political legitimist revanchism in the territory which belonged to the fallen Kingdom. Indeed the already small movement lost a considerable amount of its support when its allies the political Catholics managed to find a way to express themselves in the Kingdom thanks to the attenuation of the uncompromising stance adopted by the Pope regarding the participation of Catholics in voting and Luigi Sturzo creation of his political party, the Italian People's Party, after World War I, having a small resurgence only after World War II. Indeed the term itself was only born in 1960, even if the movement itself was more explored and used by writers of very different ideologies, more as a social and historical exploration of one of the motives behind post-unification Italian brigandage present at that time. It was only in 1993 that the movement, while still very small, had a significative resurgence as an autonomist or secessionist movement for the first time since the first years after the unification of Italy, in parallel with the creation in those years in Northern Italy of autonomist and secessionist parties like Lega Nord and underwent a considerable surge in popularity in the years around 2011, coinciding with the celebrations of the 150th anniversary of the Unification of Italy. The Neo-Bourbonist movement is a grassroots movement supported by small political movements, amateur websites and prolific pseudo-historical publications, leading the Italian newspaper Corriere del Mezzogiorno to speak of "neo-Bourbon revanchism, in vogue in recent years, ...".

== History ==
The Siege of Gaeta, which ended on February 13, 1861, marked the surrender of the Bourbon kingdom of the Two Sicilies to Italian unification forces. Afterwards Bourbon propaganda developed during the Expedition of the Thousand continued during the period of post-unification brigandage. Defeat of the Kingdom of Two Sicilies was attributed to internal betrayals, and unification of Italy was view as a Piedmontese invasion, in opposition to academic historiography. (Possible source: "Terroni" by Pino Aprile)

These viewpoints were augmented with allegations of British and Masonic plots against the kingdom, the fight between the Italian Royal Army and the brigandage, as well as with alleged arguments of Bourbon excellence such as the exemplary nature of the royal family, and the proclamation of primacy of the kingdom and city of Naples.

=== Twentieth century ===
A revival of the neo-Bourbon ideology took place at the end of the twentieth century, a period of rising support for local independence movements throughout Italy with the success of the Lega Lombarda. In Southern Italy this birthed numerous local associations, historical groups, publishing, websites and blogs. These groups systematically reproduced, rewrote and exaggerated Bourbon propaganda. The movement reached its peak with the opposition to the celebrations for the 150th anniversary of the unification of Italy, coming to propose a neo-Bourbon mythology based on a "nineteenth-century nationalist canon with its obsession with violated communities, the blood of martyrs, the honor of heroes and heroines, the impiety of traitors and the cruelty of enemies". The rhetoric being identical in form to the old pro-unification propaganda but working towards the opposite ends.

In these years false histories appeared in publication, among the various falsities it was claimed that the Kingdom of the Two Sicilies was at the forefront of technology and economics in Europe, attributing to it a long list of discoveries, inventions and primates in every field of human knowledge and that the repression of brigandage had led to a genocide with figures close to one million dead with the establishment of extermination camps such as the Fenestrelle Fort.

These arguments have been highlighted by historians as false. The historian Alessandro Barbero, who called the story of Fenestrelle "a historiographical and media invention", consulting the original documents of the time, verified how the prisoners of the former Bourbon army actually detained in the fort only numbered just over a thousand, of which 4 died during captivity. Similarly, the arguments on genocide have been denied by every professional magazine in the field.

== See also ==
- Bourbonism (disambiguation)
