= Porelli =

Porelli is an Italian surname. Notable people with the surname include:

- Gianluigi Porelli (1930–2009), Italian basketball executive
- Giuseppe Porelli (1897–1982), Italian actor

== See also ==
- Morelli
