= Isaac D'Israeli =

British writer and scholar (1766–1848)

- c. 1790–1848 portrait
- Born: 11 May 1766; Enfield, Middlesex
- Died: 19 January 1848 (aged 81); Bradenham, Buckinghamshire
- Education: Leiden University
- Occupations: Writer; scholar
- Years active: 1782–1848
- Employer: John Murray
- Spouse: Maria Basevi (m. 1802; died 1847)
- Children: 5
- Father: Benjamin D'Israeli

Isaac D'Israeli (11 May 1766 – 19 January 1848) was a British writer and scholar who was the father of British Prime Minister Benjamin Disraeli. He is best known for his essays and associations with other men of letters.

== Life and career ==
Isaac was born in Enfield, Middlesex, England, the only child of Benjamin D'Israeli, a Sephardic Jewish merchant who had immigrated from Cento, Italy, in 1748, and his second wife, Sarah Syprut de Gabay Villa Real. Isaac received much of his education in Leiden. At the age of 16, he began his literary career with some verses addressed to Samuel Johnson. He became a frequent guest at the table of the publisher John Murray and became one of the noted bibliophiles of the time.

In 1797 D'Israeli published Vaurien, a romantic novel set in radical circles following the French Revolution. Conservative commentators praised the book for its mockery of radicals in England and depiction of Vaurien, who has come from France to foment revolution. Yet they were perturbed by his depiction of a prostitute, who is kindly and was forced into prostitution to feed her family after her husband was ruined by a litigious neighbour for stealing an apple. Moreover, they were shocked by a chapter in which Disraeli launched a staunch defence of the Jewish community condemning the way Jews were treated in England.

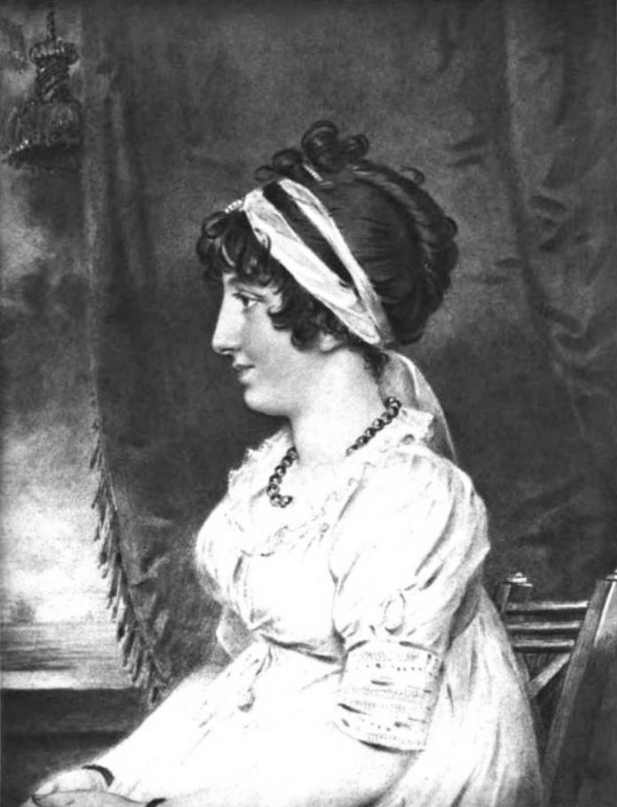
1805 portrait of D'Israeli's wife Maria

On 10 February 1802, D'Israeli married Maria Basevi, who came from another London merchant family of Italian-Jewish descent. The marriage was a happy one, producing five children: Sarah ("Sa"; 1802–1859); Benjamin ("Ben" or "Dizzy"; 1804–1881); Naphtali (b. 1807, died in infancy); Raphael ("Ralph"; 1809–1898); and Jacobus ("James" or "Jem"; 1813–1868). The children were named according to Jewish customs and the boys were all circumcised. Religiously, however, Isaac D'Israeli appears to have set aside his Jewish beliefs. In the midst of an eight-year dispute with the Bevis Marks Synagogue and on the advice of his friend, historian Sharon Turner, all his children were baptised into the Church of England in 1817. In 1833 he published a severely critical analysis of contemporary Judaism, The Genius of Judaism. He himself did not receive baptism, however, and never indicated any desire to exchange Judaism for Christianity. He did attend the inauguration ceremonies of the Reform Synagogue at Burton Street, London.

He penned a handful of English adaptations of traditional tales from the Middle East, wrote a few historical biographies, and published a number of poems. His most popular work was a collection of essays entitled Curiosities of Literature. The work contained myriad anecdotes about historical persons and events, unusual books, and the habits of book-collectors. The work was very popular and sold widely in the 19th century, reaching its eleventh edition (the last to be revised by the author) in 1839. It was still in print when the Encyclopædia Britannica entry was written in 1911. His book The Life and Reign of Charles I (1828) resulted in his being awarded the degree of D.C.L. from the University of Oxford.

D’Israeli also published Calamities of Authors (1812) within his Miscellanies.

In 1841, he became blind and, though he underwent an operation, his sight was not restored. He continued writing with his daughter as his amanuensis. In this way he produced Amenities of Literature (1841) and completed the revision of his work on Charles I. He died of influenza at age 81, at his home, Bradenham House, in Buckinghamshire, less than a year after the death of his wife in the spring of 1847.

D'Israeli's daughter-in-law, the wife of his eldest son, Benjamin, erected a monument to him in June 1862 following his death. It stands on a hill near Hughenden Manor, the Disraelis' country house in Buckinghamshire.

== Works ==
=== Fiction ===
- Mejnoun and Leila the Arabian Petrarch and Laura (1797)
- Love and Humility (1797)
- The Lovers (1797)
- Vaurien: or, Sketches of the Times Exhibiting Views of the Philosophies, Religions, Politics, Literature and the Manners of the Age (1797)
- The Daughter (1801)
- Flim-Flams! or the Life and Errors of My Uncle and the Amours of My Aunt (1805–1856)
- Despotism or the Fall of the Jesuits (1811)

=== Major non-fiction ===
- Curiosities of Literature, Volumes I, II, III (originally published in 5 volumes, 1791–1823)
- A Dissertation on Anecdotes (1793)
- An Essay on the Literary Character (1795)
- Miscellanies; or, Literary Recreations (1796)
- Romances (1799)
- Calamities of Authors (1812–1813)
- Quarrels of Authors, Volumes I, II, III (1814)
- Commentaries on the Life and Reign of Charles the First, King of England (originally published in 5 volumes, 1828-1831)
- The Genius of Judaism (1833)
- Miscellanies of Literature (1840)
- Amenities of Literature (1841)
