= Giuseppe Maria Ficatelli =

Italian painter (1639–1703)

Giuseppe Maria Ficatelli (1639 – 3 September 1703) was an Italian painter of the Baroque period.

He was born in Cento, and pupil of Cesare Gennari, flourished in the latter half of the 17th century, and painted pictures for the churches of his native city. His sons, Paolo Antonio (1671–1724) and Stefano Felice Ficatelli (1686–1771), inherited his studio and were active local painters.

Ficatelli is not to be confused with the mathematician Giuseppe Maria Figatelli (1611–1682).
