= Stefano Felice Ficatelli =

Italian painter (1686–1771)

Stefano Felice Ficatelli (8 April 1686 – 5 September 1771) was an Italian painter of the late Baroque period.

== Biography ==
He was born in Cento. He is described as a fertile copyist of Guercino works, who painted for churches in Ferrara.

He was the son of Giuseppe Maria (1639 – 1703) of Cento, from whom he inherited a studio, and who had trained with Cesare Gennari, Guercino's nephew. His brother Paolo Antonio was also a painter and copyist of Guercino.
