= Morelli =

Morelli is an Italian surname. Notable people with the surname include:

- Annamaria Morelli, Italian film producer
- Anthony Morelli (born 1985), former American football quarterback
- Anthony Morelli (born 1968), American blogger
- Antonio Morelli (1904-1974), orchestra leader for the Sands Hotel Copa Room from 1954 through 1971
- Cosimo Morelli (1732–1812), Italian architect, exponent of neoclassical architecture
- Dino Morelli (born 1973), Northern Irish racing driver
- Domenico Morelli (1823–1901), Italian painter
- Eugenio Morelli (born 1946), Italian physician, poet, writer, essayist and art critic
- Everton Morelli (born 1997), Brazilian footballer
- François Morelli (1833–1892), French shipowner and politician
- Francesco Morelli (ca. 1767 – ca. 1830), French-Italian painter and engraver
- Gabriele Morelli (rugby union) (born 1988), retired Italian rugby union player
- Gabriele Morelli (born 1996), Italian footballer
- Gaetano Morelli (1900–1989), Italian jurist and magistrate
- Giampaolo Morelli (born 1974), Italian actor, director, and screenwriter
- Giovanni Morelli (1816–1891), Italian art critic and political figure
- Jack Morelli or John Morelli (born 1962), American comic book letterer and author
- James Morelli (1927–1949), gangster based in Chicago
- John Morelli (1923–2004), American football player
- Laura Morelli, American art historian
- Lazzaro Morelli (1608–1690), Italian sculptor of the Baroque period
- Leano Morelli (born 1950), Italian singer-songwriter
- Lorenzo Morelli (born 1988), Italian footballer
- Luca Morelli (born 1987), Italian motorcycle racer
- Maria Maddalena Morelli (1727–1800), Florentine Italian poet
- Mario Rosario Morelli (born 1941), Italian judge
- Marco Morelli (born 2007), Argentine-Spanish motorcycle racer
- Óscar Morelli, born Oscar Bonfiglio Mouet (1936–2005), Mexican actor
- Pete Morelli (born 1951), American football official in the National Football League
- Reg Morelli (1935–2020), Canadian ice hockey center
- Renato Morelli (1905–1977), anti-fascist, Liberal Italian politician
- Rina Morelli (1908–1976), Italian actress
- Spartaco Morelli (1908–1968), Swiss-born Italian marathon runner
- Steve Morelli OAM, Australian linguist, co-founder of Muurrbay Aboriginal Language and Culture Co-operative in 1986
- Tony Morelli (1956–2015), Canadian stuntman and martial artist

== See also ==
- Morelli (company), Italian coachbuilding firm
- Morelli's, an international ice cream manufacturer founded by Giuseppe Morelli in 1907
- Dodici Morelli, sometimes called XII Morelli, municipality of Cento in the Province of Ferrara, Italy
- Morelli House, historic home of Sands Hotel band leader and musical conductor Antonio Morelli
