= Julius H. Comroe Jr. =

Medical researcher

Julius H. Comroe Jr
- Born: March 13, 1911; York, Pennsylvania
- Died: July 31, 1984 (aged 73); Hillsborough, California
- Education: University of Pennsylvania
- Scientific career
- Fields: Respiratory and cardiovascular physiology
- Workplaces: University of Pennsylvania, University of California, San Francisco.

Julius H. Comroe, Jr. (March 13, 1911 – July 31, 1984) was a surgeon, medical researcher, author and educator, described by The New York Times as an "award-winning expert on the functions and physiology of the human heart and lungs". His work contributed to advances in respiratory physiology, cardiology, heart and vascular surgery, and the treatment of pulmonary disease, hypertension and high blood pressure.

Comroe became a professor at the University of Pennsylvania in 1936. He was chairman of the Department of Physiology and Pharmacology at the university's Graduate School of Medicine from 1946 to 1957. From 1957 to 1973 Comroe served as the founding director of the Cardiovascular Research Institute (CVRI) at the University of California, San Francisco. In 1974 he retired as director and was named the Morris Herzstein Professor of Biology.

In addition to being a fellow of the American College of Physicians, the National Academy of Sciences, and the American Academy of Arts and Sciences, Comroe was an Honorary member of the Royal Society of Medicine the American Physiological Society, and The Physiological Society of London. The annual distinguished lectureship for outstanding research in respiratory physiology at the American Physiological Society is named in Dr Comroe's honor.

== Education ==
Julius Hiram Comroe, Jr. was born in York, Pennsylvania. (Both his father Julius H.Comroe and his older brother Bernard Comroe were medical doctors.) In 1931 he graduated first in his class from the University of Pennsylvania. In 1934, he graduated first in his class from the UPenn Medical School with an M.D. degree. He became an intern at the Hospital of the University of Pennsylvania, intending to become a surgeon, but had to give up that goal after he lost one of his eyes to an infection.

== Career ==
In 1936 Comroe became an instructor at the Department of Pharmacology at the University of Pennsylvania's School of Medicine. He was promoted to Associate in 1940 and Assistant Professor in 1942. Working with Carl Frederic Schmidt, he carried out generative research work on the mechanisms and control of breathing, identifying carotid and aortic chemoreceptors and their part in the regulation of breathing. His work was considered "the definitive work on the aortic chemoreceptors".

During World War II, between 1944 and 1946, Comroe also worked with the Chemical Warfare Service. For example, he used diisopropyl fluorophosphate as a model for the effects of more lethal nerve gas on the eye.

When the University of Pennsylvania formed the Department of Physiology and Pharmacology in the Graduate School of Medicine in 1946, Comroe became both professor and chairman of the new department. Under his direction, it focused on the field of respiratory physiology. Between 1946 and 1957, Comroe continued to study breathing. With his colleagues, he developed scientific instrumentation and methods for evaluating human respiratory performance under normal conditions, while exercising, and during illness. Many of the pulmonary function tests still used are based on this work. Comroe investigated topics including reflex control of breathing, rate and depth of breathing, and the effects of drugs and oxygen. He and anesthesiologist Robert Dunning Dripps showed that the method of manual artificial respiration used at that time was inefficient, which eventually led to its replacement by mouth-to-mouth resuscitation.

In 1957 Comroe moved to the University of California, San Francisco to become Director of its new Cardiovascular Research Institute (CVRI) and professor of physiology. From 1957 to 1973 he continued his research into cardiac and pulmonary function. At the same time, he developed a highly respected program for postdoctoral training and teaching in medicine and physiology. As a medical educator he emphasized the interdisciplinarity of science, the importance of basic research, and the integration of research into clinical departments. In 1974 he stepped down as director and was named the Morris Herzstein Professor of Biology.

Comroe published both research papers and books, including The Lung (1955, 1962), Physiology of Respiration (1965, 1974), the series Physiology for Physicians, and Exploring the heart (1983). From 1966 to 1970 he edited the journal Circulation Research. From 1972–1975 he was the editor of the peer-reviewed journal Annual Review of Physiology.

Comroe was a founder of the Institute of Medicine (later National Academy of Medicine). He was a member of the National Academy of Sciences, and served on the Medical Board of the National Academy of Sciences. Comroe became a member of the American Physiological Society in 1943, served on its council and committees, and was its president for 1960-1961.

Comroe served on a number of national-level scientific advisory boards, including the National Advisory Heart Council, the Board of Scientific Counselors of the National Heart Institute, and the National Advisory Mental Health Council. In 1954, Comroe was appointed to the scientific advisory board of the Tobacco Industry Research Committee. He expressed repeated dissatisfaction with its operations and public statements, and resigned in 1960. Comroe also served on national-level educational committees of the American Society for Pharmacology and Experimental Therapeutics and the American Physiological Society.

== Books ==
- Comroe, Julius H., ed. (1950). Methods in Medical Research (2 volumes, 1st ed.). Chicago: Year Book Publishers.
- Comroe, Julius H. (1955). The Lung: clinical physiology and pulmonary function tests (1st ed.). Chicago: Year Book Publishers. (1955, 1962)
- Comroe, Julius H. Jr. (1965). Physiology of respiration: an introductory text. Chicago: Year Book Medical Publishers. ISBN 978-0-8151-1824-4. (1965, 1974)
- Comroe, Julius H. (1983). Exploring the heart: discoveries in heart disease and high blood pressure (1st ed.). New York: Norton. ISBN 978-0-393-01708-3.
- Comroe, Julius H. (1977). Retrospectroscope: insights into medical discovery. Menlo Park, Calif.: Von Gehr Press. ISBN 978-0-9601470-1-4.

== Awards and distinctions ==
- 1957, Fellow, American College of Physicians
- 1961, Member, National Academy of Sciences
- 1964, Fellow, American Academy of Arts and Sciences
- 1968, Honorary Fellow, American College of Cardiology
- 1968, Research Achievement Award, American Heart Association
- 1970, Founding Member, Institute of Medicine
- 1971, Fellow, Royal College of Physicians of London
- 1974, ACDP Teaching Award, Association of Chairmen of Departments of Physiology
- 1974, Edward Livingston Trudeau Medal. American Thoracic Society/American Lung Association
- 1975, Gold Heart Award of the American Heart Association
- 1976, Jessie Stevenson Kovalenko Medal, National Academy of Sciences
- 1977, Harriet P. Dustan Award, American College of Physicians
- 1977, Ray G. Daggs Award, American Physiological Society
- 1978, UCSF medal, University of California, San Francisco
- 1979, Eugenio Morelli International Award, Accademia dei Lincei
- 1980, Honorary member, Royal Society of Medicine
- 1981, Presidential Citation, American College of Cardiology
- 1984, Honorary member, The Physiological Society (London)
