= Bartolomeo Gennari =

Italian painter (1594–1661)

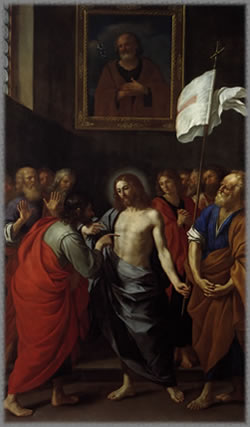
The Incredulity of Saint Thomas by Bartolomeo Gennari, Pinacoteca Comunale (Cento), 1644

Bartolomeo Gennari (10 July 1594 – 29 January 1661) was an Italian Renaissance painter. His painting style is consistent with the Bolognese School of painting.

== Biography ==
Gennari was the son of the painter Benedetto Gennari and Giulia Bovi. His baptism was recorded in the collegiate church of San Biagio in Cento:

Io Ercole Dondini Arciprete etc. ho battizato Bertolomio filiolo di M. Benedetto Genari et la Consorte Mad. Julia Buovi, et fu tenuto da M. Agustino di Faci et la Comar Mad. Jacoma Burgnona li 10 de Julio 1594.

Together with his younger brother Ercole Gennari (1597-1658), he was a lifetime associate of the baroque painter Guercino, from whom he copied several works. He died in Bologna and was buried in the church of San Nicolò of Bologna Albari.

== Works ==
Among his works are Saint Thomas, which was formerly displayed in the church of the Most Holy Rosary of Hundred and is now in the Pinacoteca of the town. He has also painted Madonna and Child with St. Felix of Cantalice, which is preserved in the Pinacoteca Comunale di Cesena. The painting St. John the Evangelist Preaches to his Disciples is in the church of San Filippo Neri. One of his students was the Forlì painter Giuseppe Maria Galleppini.
