= Borbon =

Borbon or Borbón may refer to:

== Places ==
- Borbon, Cebu, a municipality in the Philippines
- Pebble Island, Falklands, known as "Isla Borbón" in Spanish

== People ==
- Spanish royal family, Spanish members of the House of Bourbon (Spanish: Borbón)
  - Juan Carlos I of Spain, the former King of Spain from 1975 to 2014 (Juan Carlos Alfonso Víctor María de Borbón)
- Fortunato Borbon, former Governor of Batangas province in the Philippines
- Pedro Borbón, a former Major League Baseball pitcher
- Pedro Borbón, Jr., son of Pedro Borbón, also a former Major League Baseball pitcher
- Julio Borbon, a current Major League Baseball outfielder

== See also ==
- Bourbon (disambiguation)
