= Bourbonism =

Bourbonism may either refer to a form of traditionalist conservatism, likely tied to French monarchism, or tourism focused on Bourbon whiskey production. Specifically, Bourbonism may refer to:

== Politics ==
- Supporters of the royal House of Bourbon:
  - Ultra-royalist, supporters of the Bourbon Restoration
  - Legitimists, adherents of the elder branch of the Bourbon dynasty
  - Orléanist, adherents of the Orléans branch of the House of Bourbon
  - Neo-Bourbonism, nostalgia for the Kingdom of the Two Sicilies
- Bourbon Democrat (1876–1904), a conservative or classical liberal member of the U.S. Democratic Party; initially used as a pejorative

== Other uses ==
- Kentucky Bourbon Trail, a program sponsored by the Kentucky Distillers' Association, U.S.

== See also ==
- Bourbon (disambiguation)
