= Galleria d'arte moderna Aroldo Bonzagni =

- Established: 1959
- Location: Via Guercino, 39, Cento, (Italy)
- Coordinates: 44.7271°N 11.2904°E
- Website: bonzagni.comune.cento.fe.it

The Galleria d'arte moderna Aroldo Bonzagni is an Italian museum, located in Cento. It was founded in 1959 in memory of the local painter Aroldo Bonzagni, who died in 1918 at only thirty years of age.

== Collection ==
The museum collection is focused on a group of paintings by Bonzagni and a selection of works of Italian figurative painters of the twentieth century.

Among the many artists represented are Aldo Carpi, Achille Funi, Raffaele De Grada, Filippo De Pisis, Lucio Fontana, Umberto Lilloni, Giò Pomodoro, Aligi Sassu, Pio Semeghini, Mario Sironi, Adriano Spilimbergo, Guido Tallone, Renato Vernizzi, and Adolfo Wildt.
