= Benjamin D'Israeli (merchant) =

Italian-born British merchant, Benjamin Disraeli's grandfather

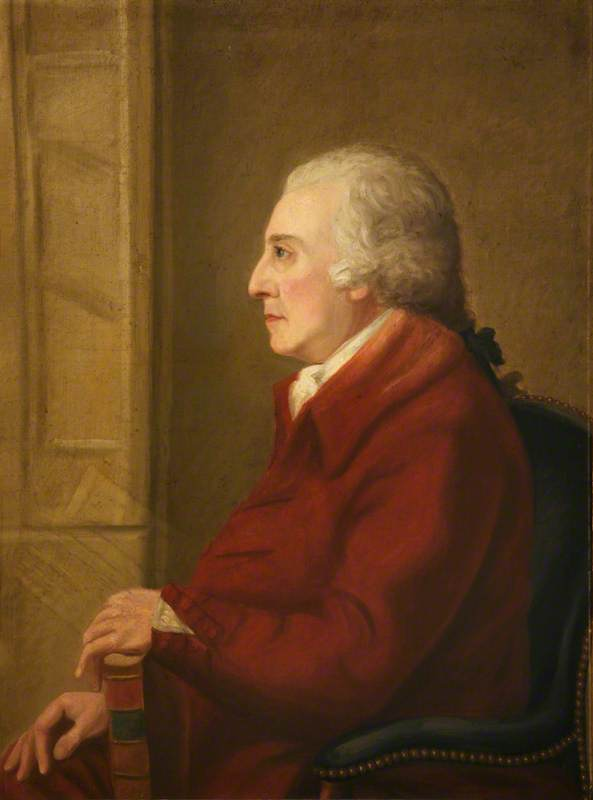
Benjamin D'Israeli

Benjamin D'Israeli (22 September 1730 – 28 November 1816) was an Italian-born English merchant and financier, the grandfather of the British prime minister Benjamin Disraeli, Earl of Beaconsfield.

D'Israeli was born in Cento, near Ferrara, then in the Papal States, now part of Italy, on 22 September 1730; he died at Stoke Newington, Middlesex, England on 28 November 1816. He moved to England in 1748 and settled there as a merchant, although he did not take out papers of denization until 1801.

Although a conforming Jew, and contributing liberally towards the support of a synagogue, D'Israeli appears to have never cordially or intimately mixed with the community; only on one occasion did he serve in a minor office—that of inspector of charity schools in the year 1782.

D'Israeli married twice. Firstly, on 2 April 1756, he married Rebecca Mendez Furtado, a woman of Portuguese origin. They had a daughter called Rachel. Within a few months of Rebecca's death on 1 February 1765 he married Sarah Siprut de Gabay Villareal, on 28 May 1765. Their only child, Isaac D'Israeli, was born the next year, on 11 May 1766.

== Life ==
D'Israeli was born in Cento (in present-day Italy), near Ferrara, then part of the Papal States, on 22 September 1730, the son of Isaac Israeli. His family were of Sephardic Jewish (Italian-Jewish) descent. (Note: Both Disraeli's grandfathers were born in Italy; Isaac's father, Benjamin, moved in 1748 from Venice to England. His second wife, Disraeli's grandmother, was Sarah Shiprut de Gabay Villareal. The maternal grandfather, Naphtali Basevi from Verona, settled in London in 1762. He married in 1767 Rebecca Rieti, born in England, the daughter of Sarah Cardoso and granddaughter of Jacob Aboab Cardoso who was already born in London (from this line, Disraeli had already four generations born in the UK).)

He was the eldest of three children. The other two were daughters, Rachel, born in 1741, and Venturina, born in 1745. Although his grandson later wrote of the family's roots in the Republic of Venice, it seems the family's only connection with that city was through these sisters, for the only records of the family in the archives of the Venetian Ghetto are of Venturina's death there in 1821 and of the death of Rachel in the register for 1837. Lord Beaconsfield, in the Memoir of his father, speaks of an elder brother of Benjamin, who was a banker in Venice and a friend of Sir Horace Mann, but according to Wolf (1902) this must be a mistake, for apart from the absence of any record of this brother, and of any mention of him in the minute and copious correspondence of Mann, the fact that Rachel and Venturina Israeli kept a girls' school in the Ghetto makes it very unlikely that they had a banker brother.

Of Isaac Israeli is noteworthy that he bore a name honored in Jewry and that he married into a family of great antiquity and of considerable renown in Ferrara. He or his ancestors probably came from the Levant, where the Arabic name-form "Israeli" would find an environment more favorable to its survival than in Western Europe, where the Israelis of Toledo had long before assimilated themselves to the native Israels. It is not unlikely (according to Wolf), in view of the rarity of his patronymic, that he was of the family of the famous philosopher and court physician Ishac ibn Sulaiman El Israeli of Kairouan, who flourished in the tenth century, but this can only be conjectured. His wife, Rica or Eurichetta Rossi, was, however, unquestionably of the ancient family of Min-Haadumin, which traced its origin to one of the Jews led into captivity after the destruction of Jerusalem by Titus and Vespasian, and, at a later date, translated its Hebrew name into its literal Italian equivalent, "Dei Rossi". The Min-Haadumin were numerous in Ferrara, where Isaac Israeli spent his life, and it was in the capital of the former duchy that the most illustrious of the clan, Azaria dei Rossi, practiced as a physician and wrote his remarkable encyclopedia of bible criticism, Meor Enayim, in the latter half of the sixteenth century.

After a short apprenticeship in Modena, Isaac Israeli's son Benjamin emigrated to England in his eighteenth year. A strong impulse had been given to Anglo-Italian trade through the establishment, in 1740, of a branch of the great Venetian and Levantine banking house of Treves in London, and consequently Italians, chiefly Italian Jews, were flocking into the country. From letters preserved by one of Benjamin Israeli's great-grandchildren, it is clear that the attraction which brought him to these shores had much less to do with the stability of the dynasty in Great Britain, by which Lord Beaconsfield has characteristically accounted for his migration, than with a humdrum, but entirely creditable, desire to find the best market for his knowledge of the straw bonnet trade. Moses Chaim Montefiore, the grandfather of Sir Moses Montefiore, also came to the country at much the same time for precisely the same reason. In both cases the prescience of the emigrants was justified, for a few years later, owing to the patronage of Maria and Elizabeth the "beautiful Misses Gunning", Italian straw bonnets associated with Livorno ("Leghorn") became the height of fashion.

At first D'Israeli was employed at a moderate salary in the counting-house of Messrs. Joseph and Pellegrin Treves in Fenchurch Street. Here he made the acquaintance of Mr. Aaron Lara, a friend of the principals, and a prosperous City broker, who thought sufficiently well of him to introduce him to his family. In 1756 he married Aaron Lara's sister-in-law, Rebecca Mendes Furtado. She was the second daughter and fourth child of Gaspar Mendes Furtado (Portugal, Fundão, near 1695) and Clara Henriques de Lara, and was three years older than her husband.

On his marriage with Rebecca Mendes Furtado, D'Israeli left the Messrs. Treves and established himself in New Broad Street as an Italian merchant, importing straw hats, marble, alum, currants, and similar merchandise. He soon found this occupation pall upon what his grandson calls his "ardent temperament", and in 1759 he obtained for himself an address at Sam's Coffee House, and devoted a large portion of his time to the more exciting operations of 'Change Alley. With capital, credit, and experience alike limited, it was not difficult to tell whether this was likely to lead. Within a few months he found himself in serious difficulties and beset with litigation. He resumed business, however, but with indifferent success, and, after struggling on for five more years, he suffered a further affliction in the loss of his wife.

His fortunes were repaired by his second marriage, which took place in May 1765. His bride was Sarah Shiprut de Gabay Villareal, younger daughter of a prosperous city merchant, Isaac Syprut, whose mother had been a Villareal, and whose wife, Esther, was sister-in-law to Simon Calimani, then Chief Rabbi of Venice.

The relationship must also have proved very useful to him in the City. At any rate, he soon became a man of substance. For ten years he prudently devoted himself to his import business, which he carried on at No. 5 Great St. Helens. In 1769 the business was also one of the sixteen leading coral merchants in London, an activity also closely connected with Treves bank, and Livorno. There also he established his private abode, until in 1783 he leased a large house in Baker Street, Enfield. The Stock Market, however, never ceased to attract him, and in 1776 he rented an office in Hamlin's Alley, Cornhill, and recommenced business there as an unlicensed broker. Three years later he took to himself two partners, and the firm became known as Messrs. D'Israeli, Stoke & Parkins. At the same time he continued his business at Great St. Helens, which was afterwards transferred to Little Winchester Street, and, in 1792, to Old Broad Street. His success is attested by the fact that the more respectable of the brokers, who had already organized the beginnings of the present Stock Exchange at New Jonathan's Coffee House, admitted him to their body, and afterwards elected him a member of their Committee for General Purposes. When, in 1801, it was resolved to build new premises at Capel Court (where the Stock Exchange remained until 1972), Mr. D'Israeli was appointed a member of the committee entrusted with the plan of conversion. He remained a member of the Stock Exchange until 1803, when he retired from business; but to the day of his death he retained an address at Tom's Coffee House, and was often seen in Cornhill, dabbling in stocks and shares.

One of the most notable enterprises with which he was associated was an attempt to substitute English straw-plaiting for the finer Italian straws then used for the best hats and bonnets. He patented a process by which "a wood which is the growth of this kingdom" was to be so treated as to yield a plait in every way equal to the Leghorn straws. The enterprise does not seem to have proved successful.

D'Israeli died in November 1816 at his house at 7 Church Row (which became Church Street), Stoke Newington, and was attended on his deathbed by a noted physician, Dr. John Aikin, who happened to be his neighbor. He left a fortune valued at £35,000 (equivalent to £2.9 million in 2025).
