= Giuseppe Maria Figatelli =

Italian mathematician

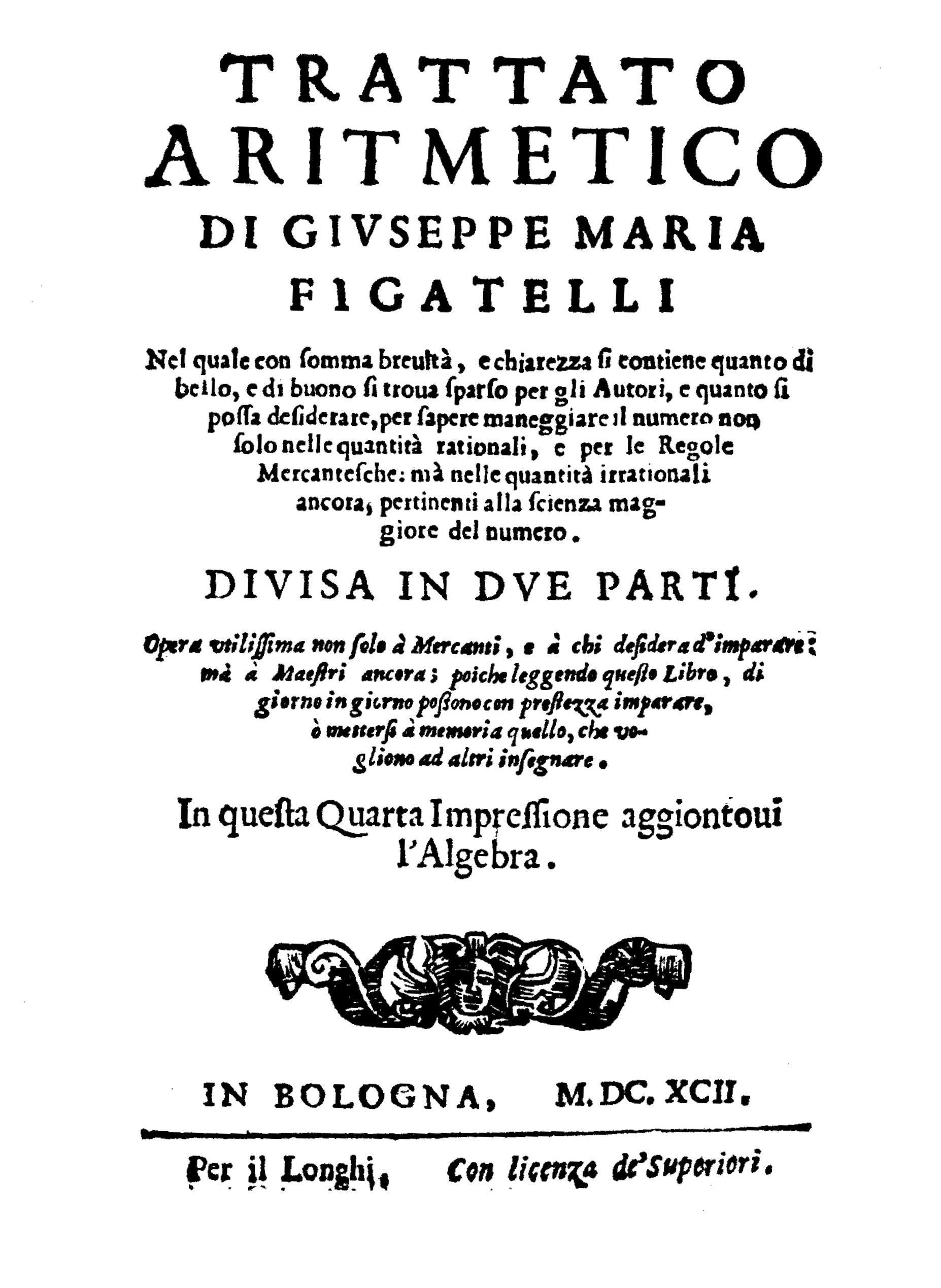
Trattato aritmetico, 1692

Giuseppe Maria Figatelli or Giuseppe Maria da Cento (Casumaro, 11 March 1611 – Mirandola, 20 November 1682) was an Italian mathematician and Capuchin friar.

Not to be confused with the painter Giuseppe Maria Ficatelli from Cento (1639 – 1703).

== Works ==
- Ristretto aritmetico (in Italian). Modena: Andrea Cassiani. 1664.
- Retta linea gnomonica (in Italian). Forlì: Giovanni Cimatti. 1667.
- Trattato aritmetico (in Italian). Bologna: Giuseppe Longhi. 1692.
