= Chiesa del Rosario, Cento =

Church in Emilia-Romagna, Italy

Coordinates: 44.7292°N 11.2904°E

Church of the Rosary, or Chiesa del Rosario, is a Baroque Roman Catholic church located on Via San Salvatore in Cento, Province of Ferrara, Region of Emilia-Romagna, Italy.

== History ==
Construction of the church began in 1633, using designs by Algarotto, commissioned by the Confraternity del Rosario, which was operating initially from a church in Borgo da Sera inferiore. The church was consecrated in 1645. Guercino was for many years prior of the confraternity; and he helped design the facade. Part of the funds came from ex votos in gratitude for cessation of the plague epidemic of 1631.

Due to damage from the 2012 Northern Italy earthquakes, restorations were in progress in 2014. The church still maintains the elaborate main altar, designed the architect and scenic designer Ferdinando Galli Bibiena.
