= Aroldo Bonzagni =

Italian painter (1887–1918)

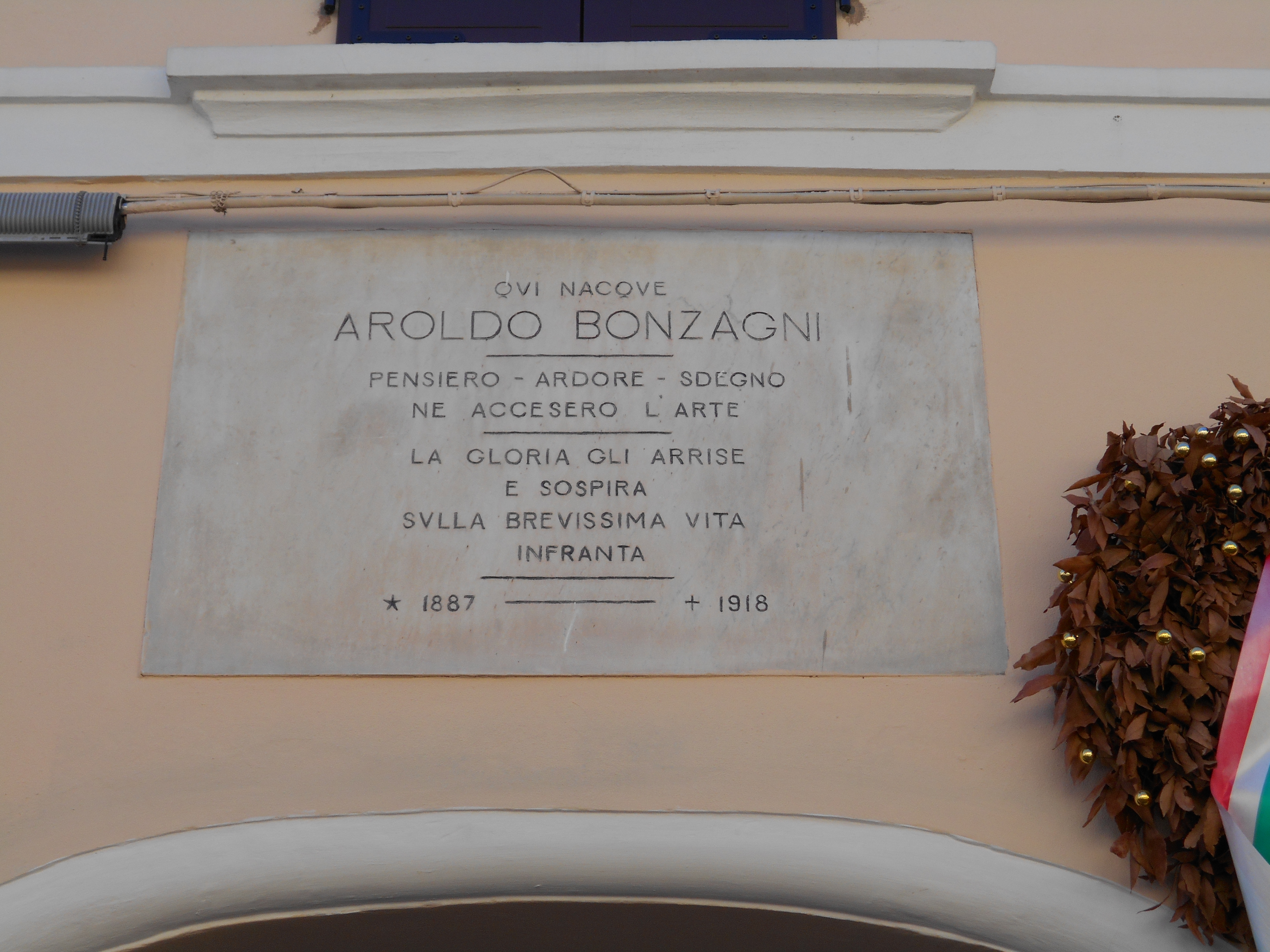
Birthplace in Cento

Aroldo Bonzagni (24 September 1887 – 30 December 1918) was a painter, draftsman, and illustrator born in Cento, Italy.

He moved to Milan to attend the Accademia di Brera on a scholarship, joining the ranks of avant-garde artists and becoming friends with Carlo Carrà, Umberto Boccioni, and Luigi Russolo. He was extremely critical of the elite society of the times and signed the first Futurist Manifesto in 1910.

Bonzagni died from the Spanish influenza pandemic in Milan.

In Cento, the Galleria d'arte moderna Aroldo Bonzagni was established in 1959 in his memory.

== Gallery ==
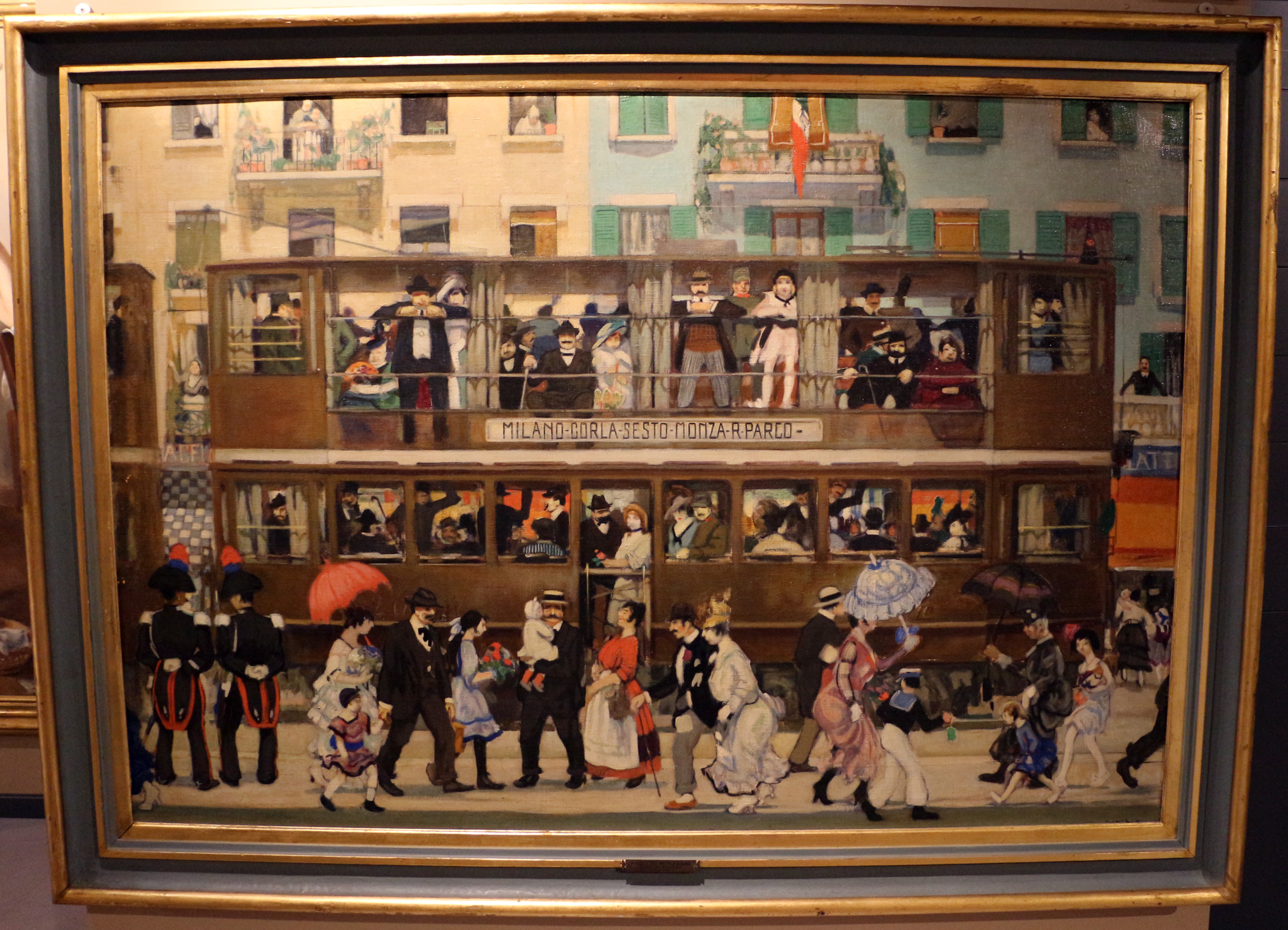
The Tramway to Monza
ca. 1910–1915

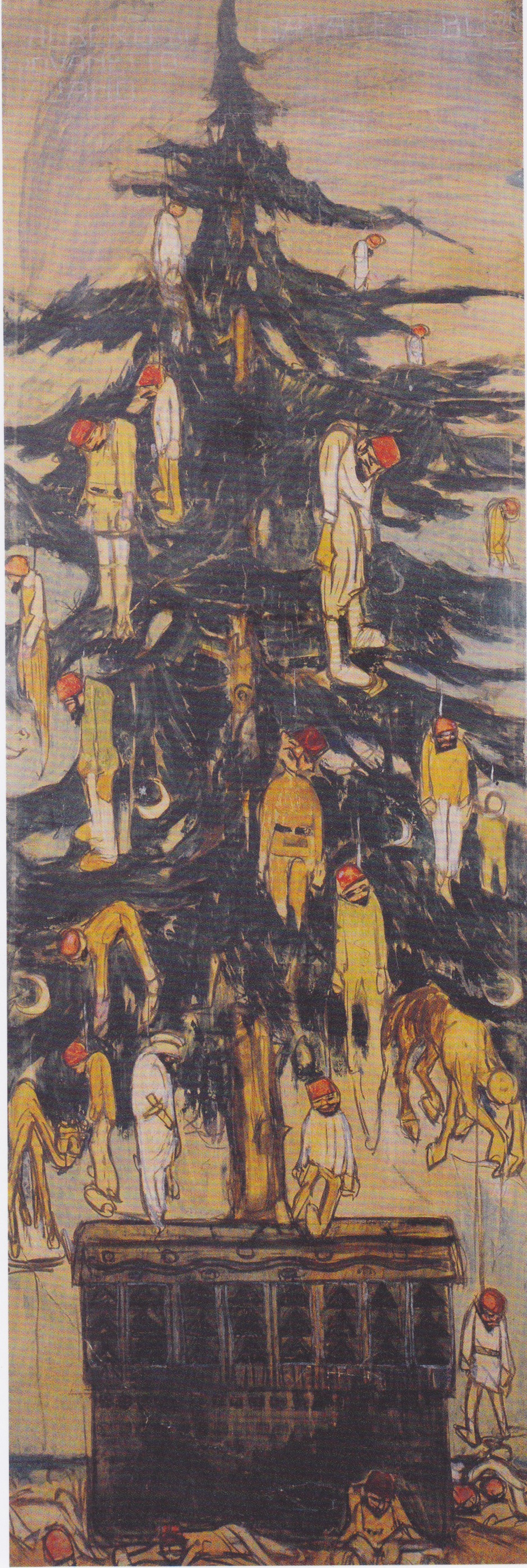
The Hanging Tree
1911

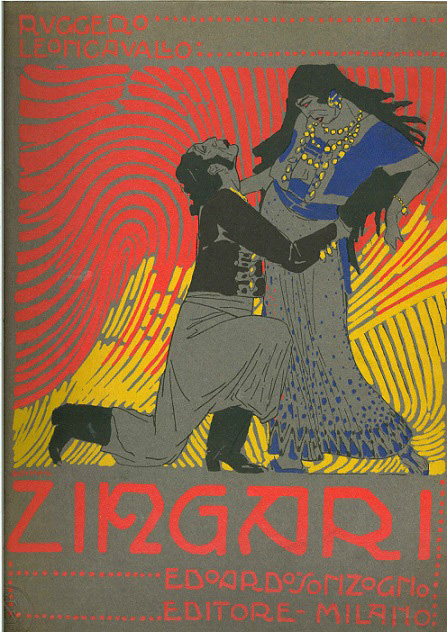
Cover of the piano/vocal score for Leoncavallo's opera Zingari
1912

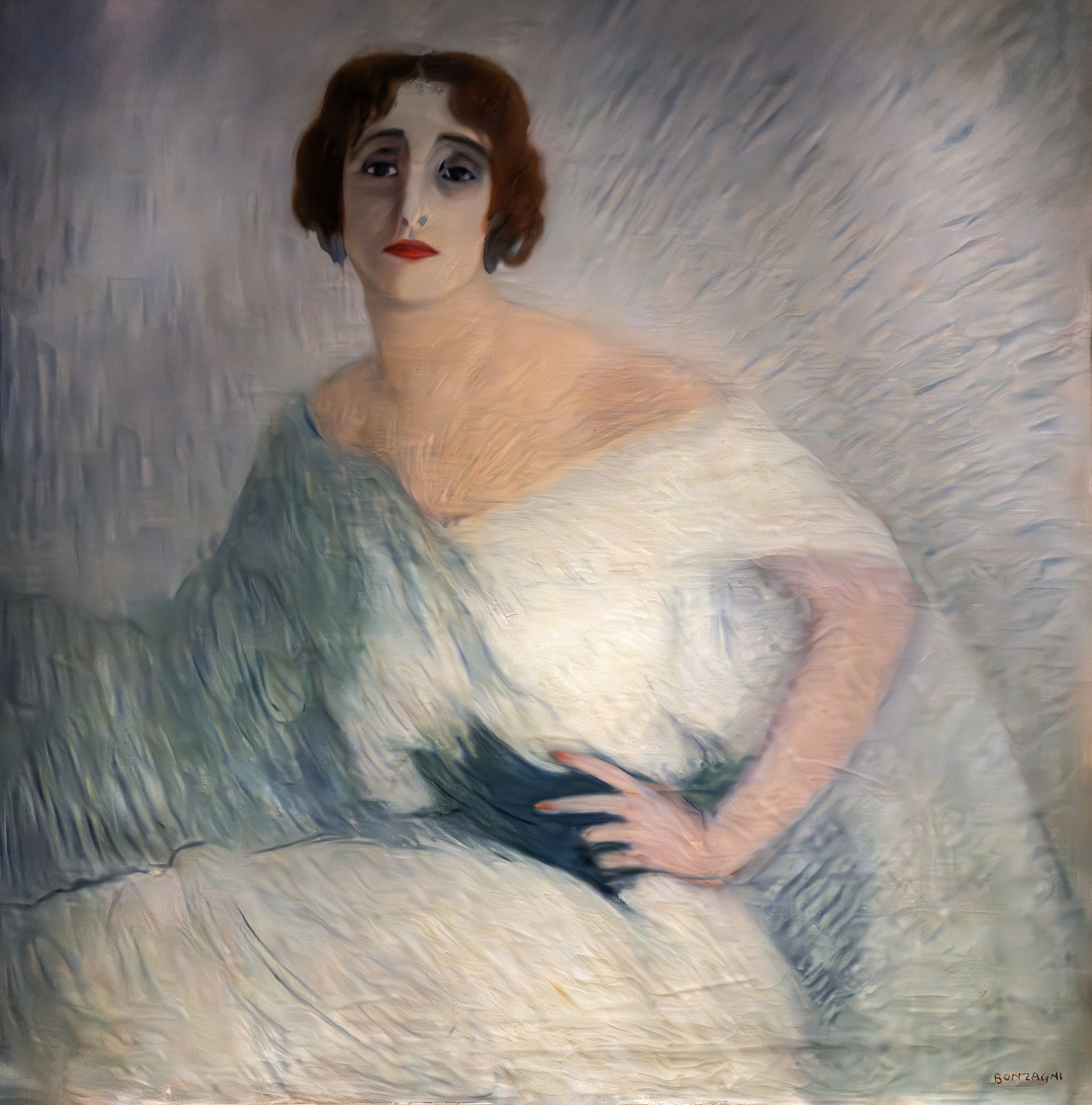
Portrait of Lyda Borelli, 1914, Galleria d'arte moderna Aroldo Bonzagni

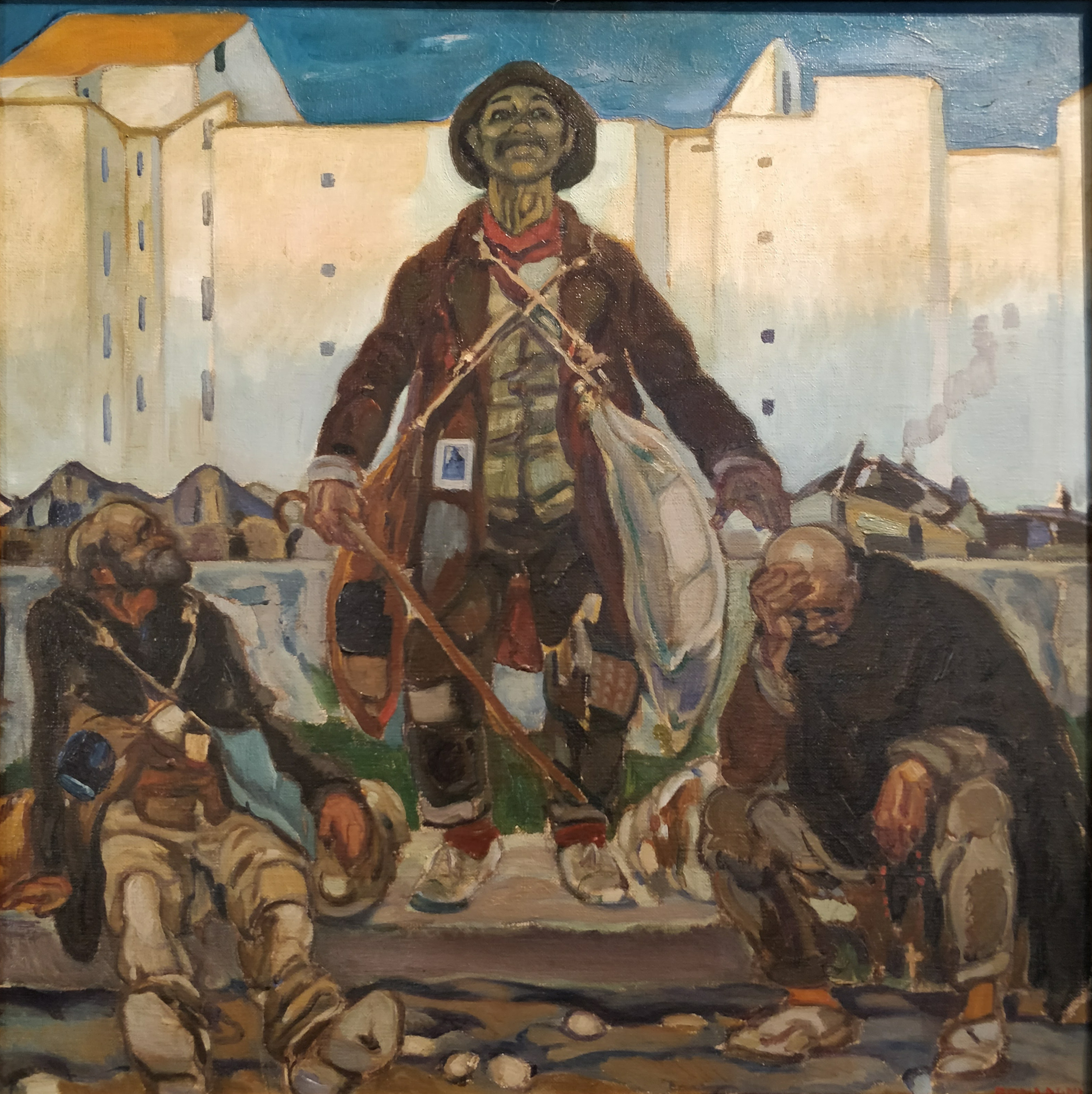
Poor people
1917–1918
Galleria d'arte moderna Aroldo Bonzagni
