= Ercole Gaetano Bertuzzi =

Italian painter (1668–1710)

Ercole Gaetano Bertuzzi (1668–1710) was an Italian painter of history during the late Baroque period.

== Biography ==
He was born in Bologna. He studied under Cesare Gennari, and became a member of the Accademia Clementina of Bologna. He painted some rooms in the palace of the Marchesi Canossa in Valverde near Cesenatico, and quadratura for the house of the same family in Reggio Emilia.
