= Ercole Gennari =

Italian painter

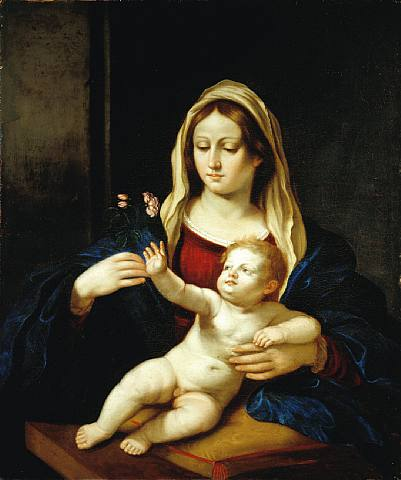
Madonna and Child by Ercole Gennari, private collection

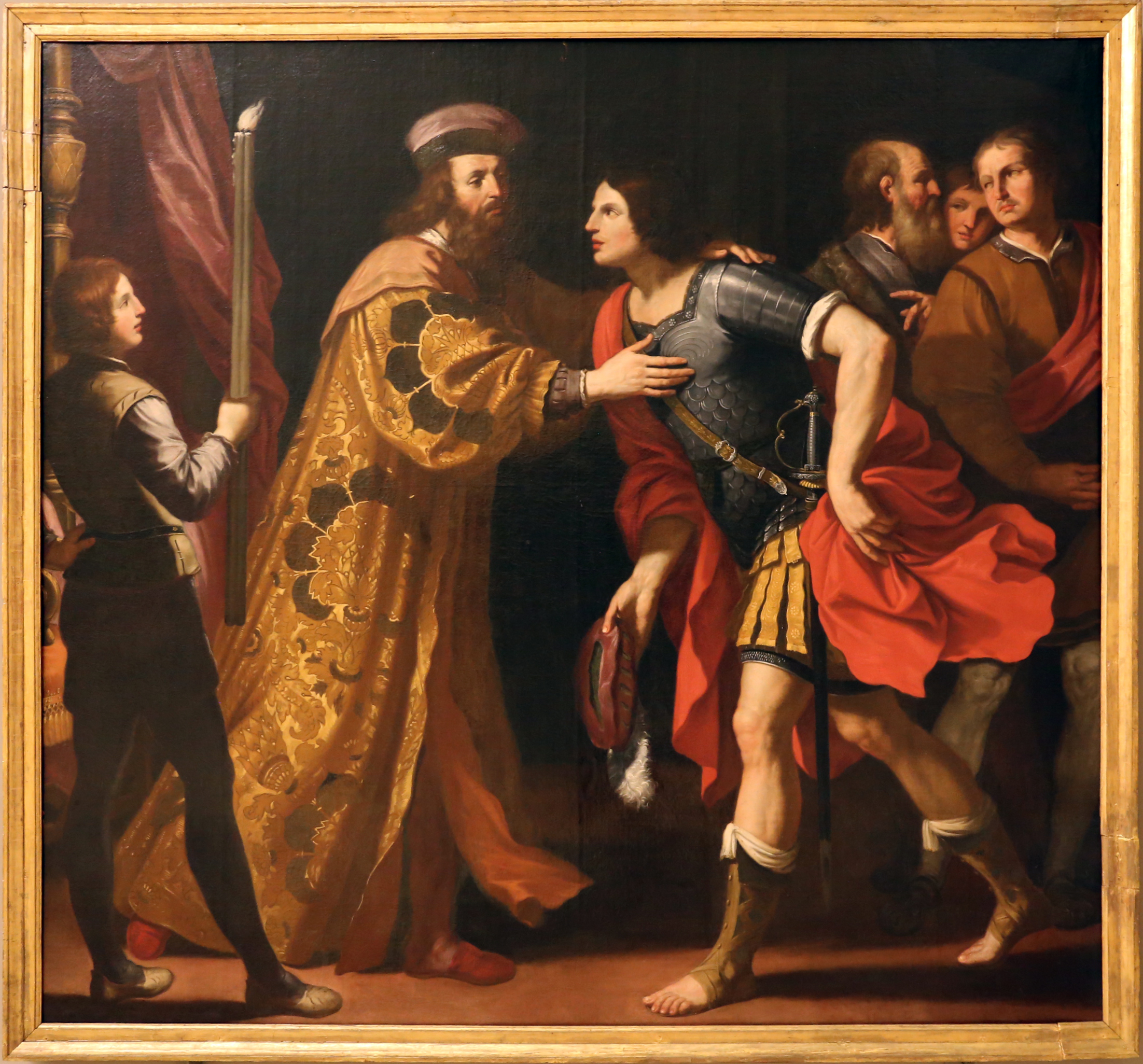
Farewell of Cato from Utica by Ercole Gennari (1636)

Ercole Gennari (10 March 1597 – 27 June 1658) was an Italian Renaissance drawer and painter.

Son of the painter Benedetto Gennari and Julia Bovi, Ercole was baptized in the collegiate church of San Biagio, in Cento. He originally studied to be a surgeon. However, his lifetime association with the painter Guercino, including marrying his sister Lucia in 1628, and the guidance and influence of his father and his older brother, the painter Bartolomeo Gennari (1594–1661), led Ercole to choose the profession of painter. His style puts him in the Bolognese School of painting. He painted Madonna and Child with St. Felix of Cantalice and Trinity with Saints Ursula, Francesco and Antonio, preserved in the Pinacoteca Comunale di Cesena. After the death of Paul Anthony, the brother of Guercino who was the assistant principal and administrator of the painting workshop, Ercole went to live with his wife and sons Benedetto and Cesare, in Bologna, in the house of Guercino, who, without a family of his own, needed someone to maintain the relationships with customers and administer the property, which he bequeathed to the young grandchildren to whom he had also taught him to paint. Ercole Gennari was buried in the family chapel of the Bolognese church of St. Nicholas of Albari.
