= USS Bourbon =

Frigate of the Continental Navy

History

United States
- Name: USS Bourbon
- Ordered: 23 January 1777
- Launched: 31 July 1783
- Home port: Chatham (now Middletown), Conn.
- Fate: Sold, September 1783

General characteristics
- Type: Frigate
- Tonnage: 900 tons
- Armament: 36-40guns

USS Bourbon was a 28-gun frigate of the Continental Navy named for the House of Bourbon. During the American Revolutionary War, Bourbon was authorized as a 36-gun frigate by the Continental Congress 23 January 1777. Very little else is known about it, but it was built at Chatham, Connecticut. Capt. John Cotton oversaw its construction.

Due to the Congress's financial difficulties, it was not launched until 31 July 1783. In September 1783, still uncompleted, it was offered for sale and presumably sold.
