= Marco Antonio Gennari =

Italian rugby union player

Marco Gennari
- Full name: Marco Antonio Gennari
- Born: 5 July 1992 (age 34) Parma, Italy
- Height: 1.77 m (5 ft 10 in)
- Weight: 80 kg (176 lb; 12 st 8 lb)

Rugby union career
- Position: Wing
- Current team: Valorugby Emilia
Senior career
Years	Team	Apps	(Points)
2011−2013	Crociati Parma	32	(138)
2013−2016	Viadana	21	(156)
2016−	Valorugby Emilia		
- Correct as of 15 November 2020
International career
Years	Team	Apps	(Points)
2011	Italy Under 20	7	(30)
- Correct as of 15 November 2020

Marco Antonio Gennari (born 5 July 1992 in Parma) is an Italian rugby union player. His usual position is as a Wing and he currently plays for Valorugby Emilia in Top12.

In 2011 he was named in the Italy Under 20 squad.
