= Constable de Bourbon =

The term Constable de Bourbon might refer to any of the following Constables of France:

- James I, Count of La Marche, constable 1354–1356, killed at the Battle of Brignais
- John II, Duke of Bourbon (1426–1488), constable 1483
- Charles III, Duke of Bourbon, constable 1518–1523, killed at the Sack of Rome
