= Curlo =

Italian noble family

Curlo is the name of one of the oldest Italian noble families with the titles of Marquess, and patricians of Ventimiglia, Taggia and Genoa.

== Middle Ages ==
1161: Gianotto was Consul of Genoa.

1188: Oggerio signed the peace treaty with Pisa for the Republic of Genoa.

In 1268, Vivaldo was one of the eight nobles in the Podestà.

In 1270, the Curlos were at the head of the armed opposition of noble families to Luca Grimaldi reaching the possession of the Podestà of Ventimiglia, which became the Genoa riot giving rise to the two capitano del popolo Oberto Doria and Oberto Spinola. The Curlos were both very powerful and rich at the time, the latter inferred from the vast possessions donated in 1273 by Folco to the monastery of Pesio.

In 1349, Fasciolo was castellan of Castelfranco (Finale Ligure).

In 1353, Luigi was podestà of Ventimiglia.

In 1370, Giannotto was ambassador of Genoa to the duke of Milano, and Cristiano was ancient of the Republic of Genoa, ambassador to the Pope Urban V, and general of Genoa.

In 1450 Giacomo, married to Argentina Spinola, was ambassador to the king Alfonso V of Aragon.

Lazzaro entered the Libro d'Oro of Genoan nobility in 1557.

In 1558, Fra' Filippo was bishop of the region of Nebbio in Corsica.

== Renaissance ==
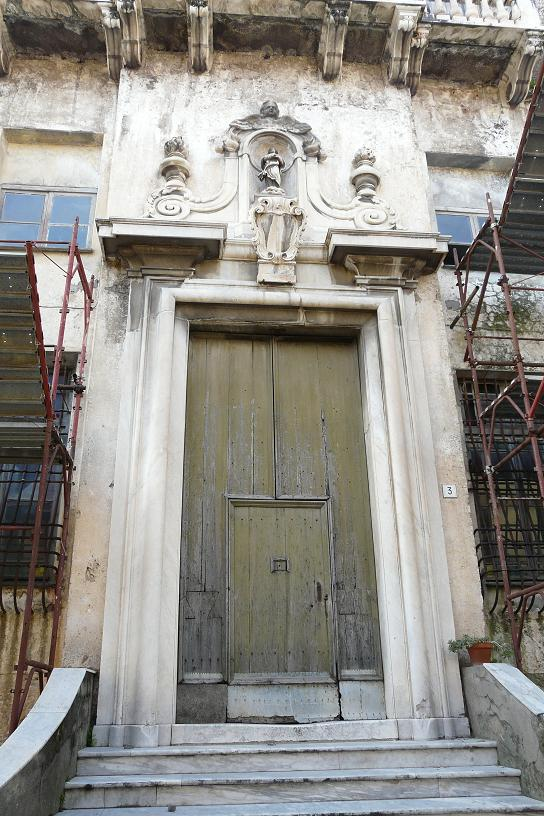
Early 18th century Palazzo Curlo Spinola (Curlo Palace) of Taggia, Liguria

The family moved to Taggia, where in 1575, they entered the Libro d'Oro of nobility.

In 1614, the bishop of the Roman Catholic Diocese of Ventimiglia-San Remo, Girolamo Curlo was sent to Corsica as Commissary Apostolic and died there by poison.

In 1625, Giovanni was knight of the Order of Saints Maurice and Lazarus.

In 1636, Roberto was Nuncio in Poland.

The Palazzo Curlo-Spinola was built in 1665-1679.

== Risorgimento ==
1767: Girolamo was senator.

Eleonora Curlo Ruffini (1781-1856), daughter of Ottavio Curlo and Agnese Spinola, was known as an Italian patriot, mother of the patriot Jacopo Ruffini and the patriot and writer Giovanni Ruffini

1796-1797: Tommaso Antonio was Podestà of Varese Ligure.

1892: recognised as Genoan patricians (male and female) and Marquess (firstborn males).

== Modern times ==
In 1911 the "Elenco uofficiale della nobilta Italiana" distinguishes five branches of the family, with the senior branch patricians (nobles) of Genoa, and the other two nobles of Taggia.

The Gennari Curlo family from Turin (branch from Genova), and the Curlo family now resident in Cuneo and Taggia (branch from Taggia), are the last descendants of the Curlo family.

== Coat of arms ==
The Curlo coat of arms is gold with a black crowned eagle, Marquess crown. The motto is "Penetrabili Visu" (piercing stare).

== Bibliography ==
- Libro d'Oro della Nobiltà Italiana, Collegio Araldico, 2000-2004.
- Enciclopedia Storico-Nobiliare Italiana, V. Spreti, 1928-1936.
- Nuova istoria della republica di Genova, Michel-Giuseppe Canale, Firenze, Felice le Monier, 1860.
