= Lorenzo Gennari =

Italian painter (1595 – 1665–1672)

- Born: 1595; Cento, Duchy of Ferrara
- Died: 1665–1672 (aged 70–77); Rimini, Papal States
- Occupation: Painter
- Father: Benedetto

Lorenzo Gennari (also known as Ariminese; 1595 – 1665–72) was an Italian painter.

Gennari was born in Cento in 1595 to the painter Benedetto. From 1615 to 1617, Gennari was apprenticed to Guercino and frescoed the Pannini family home in Cento; afterwards, he followed the senior painter to Bologna. Cassandra and Coroebus (The Capture of Cassandra and Death of Coroebus)—previously The Inspiration of Cassandra—was painted between 1615 and 1630; it was originally attributed to Guercino, but "is too clumsy to even be a copy of a lost painting of his. It is certainly an autonomous work by Gennari, but based on drawings by Guercino." Gennari died between 1665 and 1672 in Rimini.
