= Leone Carpi =

Italian Jewish writer and politician (1810-1898)

Leone Beniamino Carpi (7 September, 1810 - 19 January, 1898) was a Jewish Italian political economist and journalist who took part in the struggles of the Risorgimento. In 1849, Carpi was prominent in the defense of the Roman Republic. After its fall, he went into exile.

Carpi was born in Cento, and become the first Jewish deputy elected to the Italian Parliament, by the city of Ferrara. On the expiration of his term, he divided his time between Bologna and Rome, where he was a contributor to Popolo Romano. He threw much light on the social and moral conditions of the new united Italy by the information that he collected in all departments of the government.

His son Michelangelo Carpi (Bologna 1846 – Firenze 1917) was a famous bariton singer, buried in the Jewish sector of Cimitero Monumentale di Milano.

Among his works may be mentioned:

- Dell'Emigrazione Italiano all'Estero, nei Suoi Rapporti coll'Agricoltura, coll'Industria, e col Commercio, Florence, 1871
- Delle Colonie e dell'Emigrazione degl'Italiani all'Estero nei Loro Rapporti coll'Agricoltura, Industria, e Commercio, Milan, 1874
- Statistica Illustrata dell'Emigrazione, Rome, 1878
- L'Italia Vivente, Studi Sociali, Milan, 1878
- Il Risorgimento Italiano: Biografie Storico-Politiche d'Illustri Italiani Contemporanei, Milan, 1884
- L'Italia all'Estero, Rome, 1887

In his Dell' Emigranzione, he reported that about 555,000 "Italians" lived in what he called Italy's "colonies" abroad. Nearly half of these lived in South America, mainly in Argentina, Uruguay, and southern Brazil. 9% lived in North America, mostly in the United States. Another third lived in transalpine Europe, and 15% in North Africa, Greece, and the eastern Mediterranean.

The only work written by him relating directly to Jewish topics was his Alcune Parole Sugli Israeliti in Occasione di un Decreto Pontifico d'Interdizione, Florence, 1847.

He died in Rome on 19 January, 1898.
