= Dodici Morelli =

Village in the Province of Ferrara, Italy

Coordinates: 44.7923°N 11.2912°E

Dodici Morelli is a village in the municipality of Cento in the Province of Ferrara, Italy. It is also known as XII Morelli.
