= Bourbon Restoration =

Bourbon Restoration may refer to:

France under the House of Bourbon:

- Bourbon Restoration in France (1814, after the French revolution and Napoleonic era, until 1830; interrupted by the Hundred Days in 1815)

Spain under the Spanish Bourbons:

- Absolutist Restoration (1814, after the Napoleonic occupation, until 1868)
- Restoration Spain (1874, after the Glorious Revolution and First Spanish Republic, until 1931)
- Spanish transition to democracy, which included Bourbons’ return to power (1975, after the Second Spanish Republic and Franco era, until present)

Naples under the House of Bourbon-Two Sicilies (cadet branch of the Spanish Bourbons):

- First Restoration of Ferdinand IV (1799, after the Parthenopean Republic, until 1806)
- Second Restoration of Ferdinand IV (1815, after the Napoleonic occupation, until 1861 as the Kingdom of the Two Sicilies)
