= Benedetto Gennari II =

Italian painter (1633-1715)

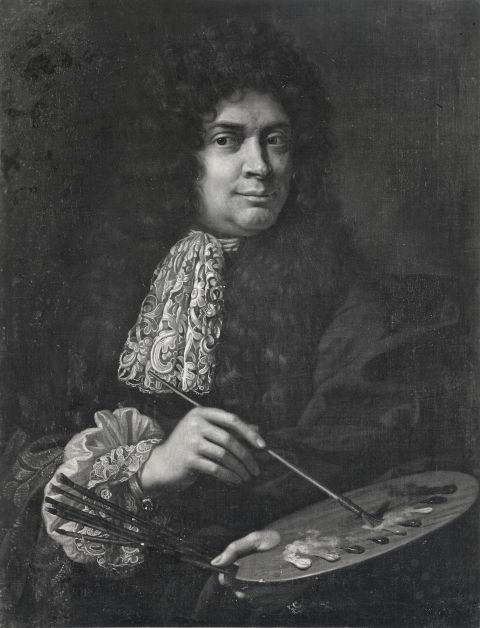
- Benedetto Gennari II Self-portrait
- Born: Benedetto Gennari; 19 October 1633; Cento, Italy
- Died: 9 December 1715 (aged 82); Bologna, Italy
- Known for: Painting
- Movement: Baroque

Benedetto Gennari II (19 October 1633 – 9 December 1715) was an Italian painter active during the Baroque period.

== Biography ==
Belonging to a dynasty of painters, Gennari was a student of Guercino, the grandson of Benedetto Gennari, and older brother of Cesare Gennari. His father was Ercole Gennari and his mother Lucia Barbieri. He trained at the workshop of the celebrated master, Guercino, hence his style was always very close to that of his teacher. Upon Guercino's death, Gennari inherited his studio, which he ran with his brother Cesare.

With a restless spirit, Gennari travelled to Paris in March 1672 to work for the court of King Louis XIV. The French nobility received him with open arms, and the multitude of commissions encouraged him to prolong his stay. In September 1674, he moved to London, where he became court painter to King Charles II of England and his successor James II. He painted allegorical and mythological scenes, and above all portraits. Catherine of Braganza and Mary of Modena, Catholic wives of Protestant kings, commissioned artworks for their private worship.

Gennari had to leave England when King James was dethroned; he followed James's court to Saint-Germain-en-Laye in 1689. By 1692, he was back in Bologna.

Gennari was an outstanding portraitist who eventually developed a style far removed from the principles taught in the school of Guercino. In the mature phase of his style, he came to acquire characteristics of the art of northern Europe, which he learned through his travels. In 1709, he was one of the founding members of the Accademia Clementina.

== Selected works ==
- Portrait of Guercino (National Art Gallery of Bologna)
- Santa Clara taking habits (1656–57, Santa Chiara, Pieve di Cento)
- Cleopatra (Yale Center for British Art, New Haven)
- Tales of Ovid's Metamorphoses (Hampton Court, London)
- Portrait of Hortense Mancini, Duchess of Mazarin (1674, Musée des Beaux-Arts, Valenciennes)
- Annunciation (1675, Cassa di Risparmio, Cento)
- Rinaldo and Armida (1676–78, Private Collection)
- Catherine of Braganza (1638-1705) Queen of King Charles II (1678, Portugal, Lisbon, British Embassy)
- King Charles II (1630-85) Reigned 1660-85 (1678, Portugal, Lisbon, British Embassy)
- Sagrada Familia (1682, Birmingham Museum and Art Gallery)
- Sleeping Young Shepherd surprised by two women (Royal Collection)
- Death of Cleopatra (1686, Victoria Art Gallery, Bath)
- Portrait of James II of England (1686, Private Collection, NY)
- Portrait of Nathaniel Cholmley (1687, Ferens Art Gallery, Hull)
- Annunciation (1686, Ringling Museum, Sarasota)
- Elizabeth Panton as Santa Catalina (1689, Tate Gallery, London)
- Mary of Modena and his son James Stuart III (1690, Pinacoteca Civica, Modena)
- Theseus and the daughters of Minos (1702, Kunsthistorisches Museum, Vienna)
- The Miracle of Saint Francis Xavier (Saint-François Xavier des Missions étrangères, Paris)

== Gallery ==
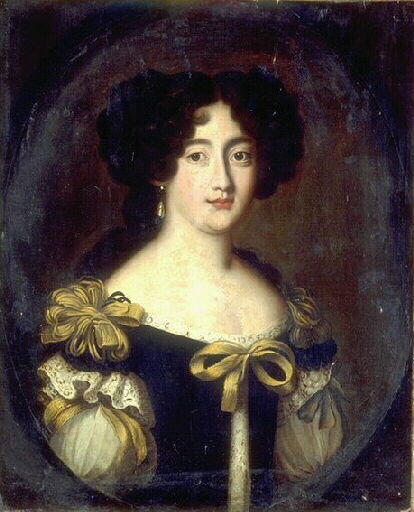
Hortense Mancini, duquesa de Mazarino

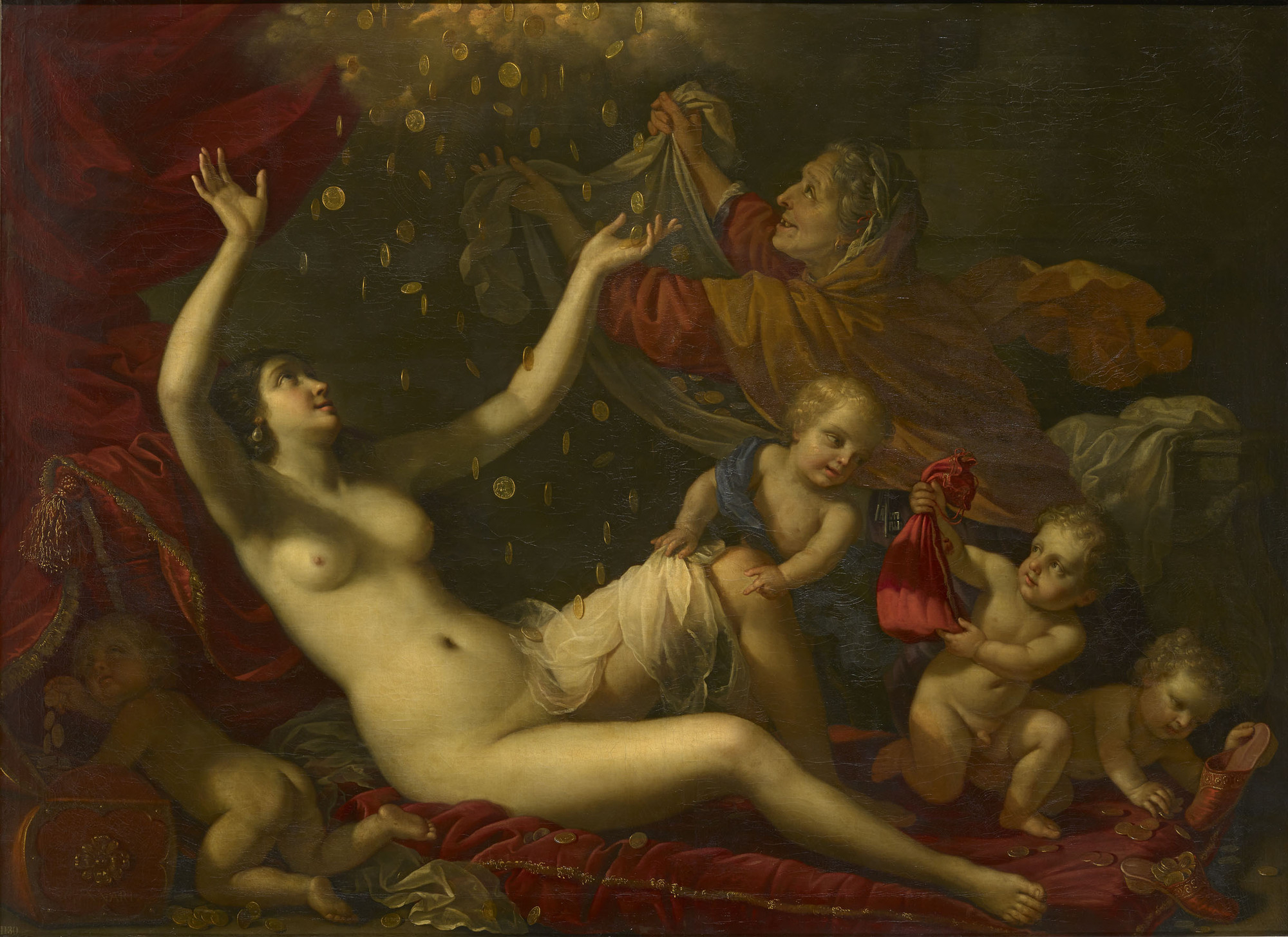
Danaë Receiving the Shower of Gold
1672-1674

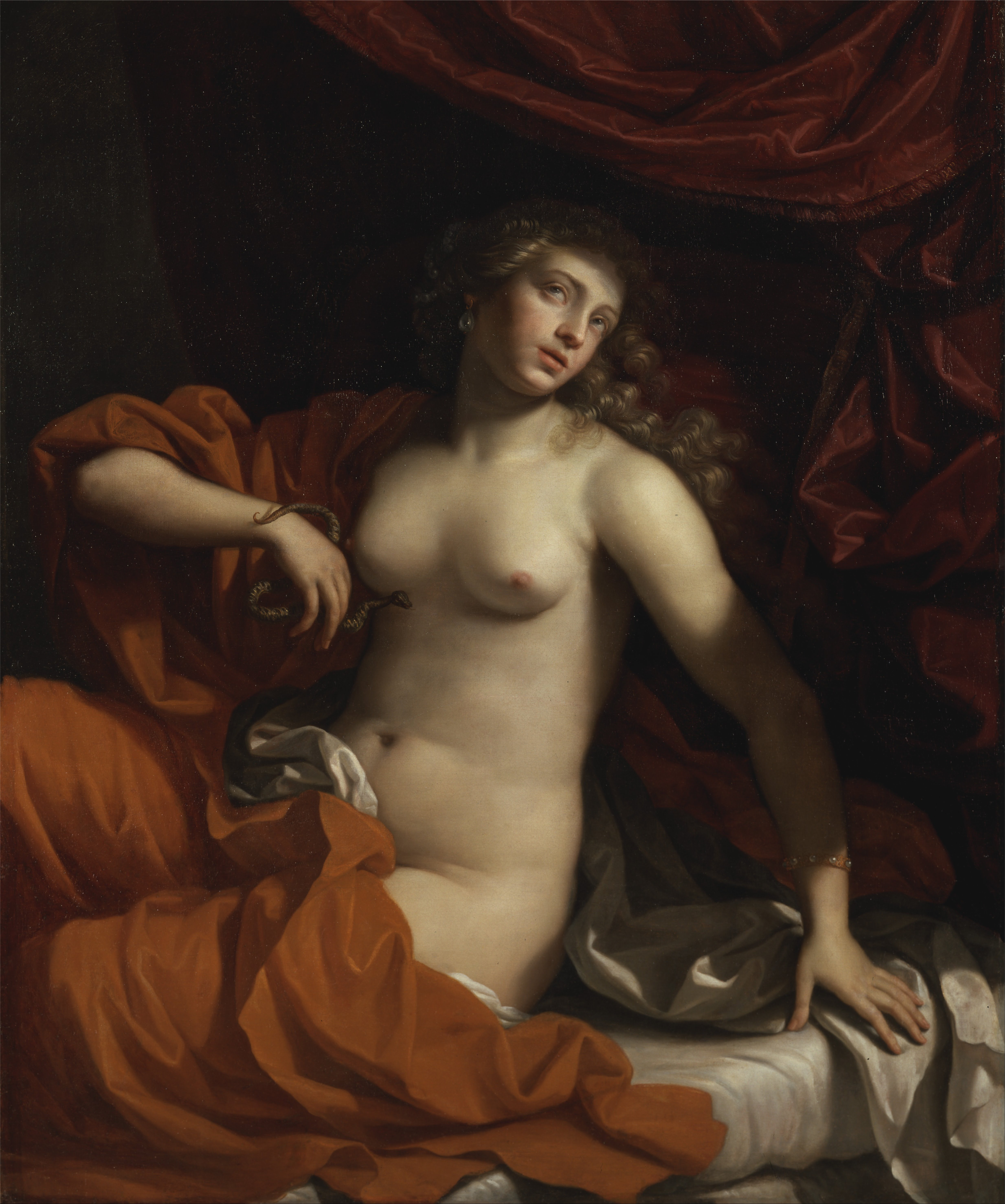
Cleopatra
1674-1675

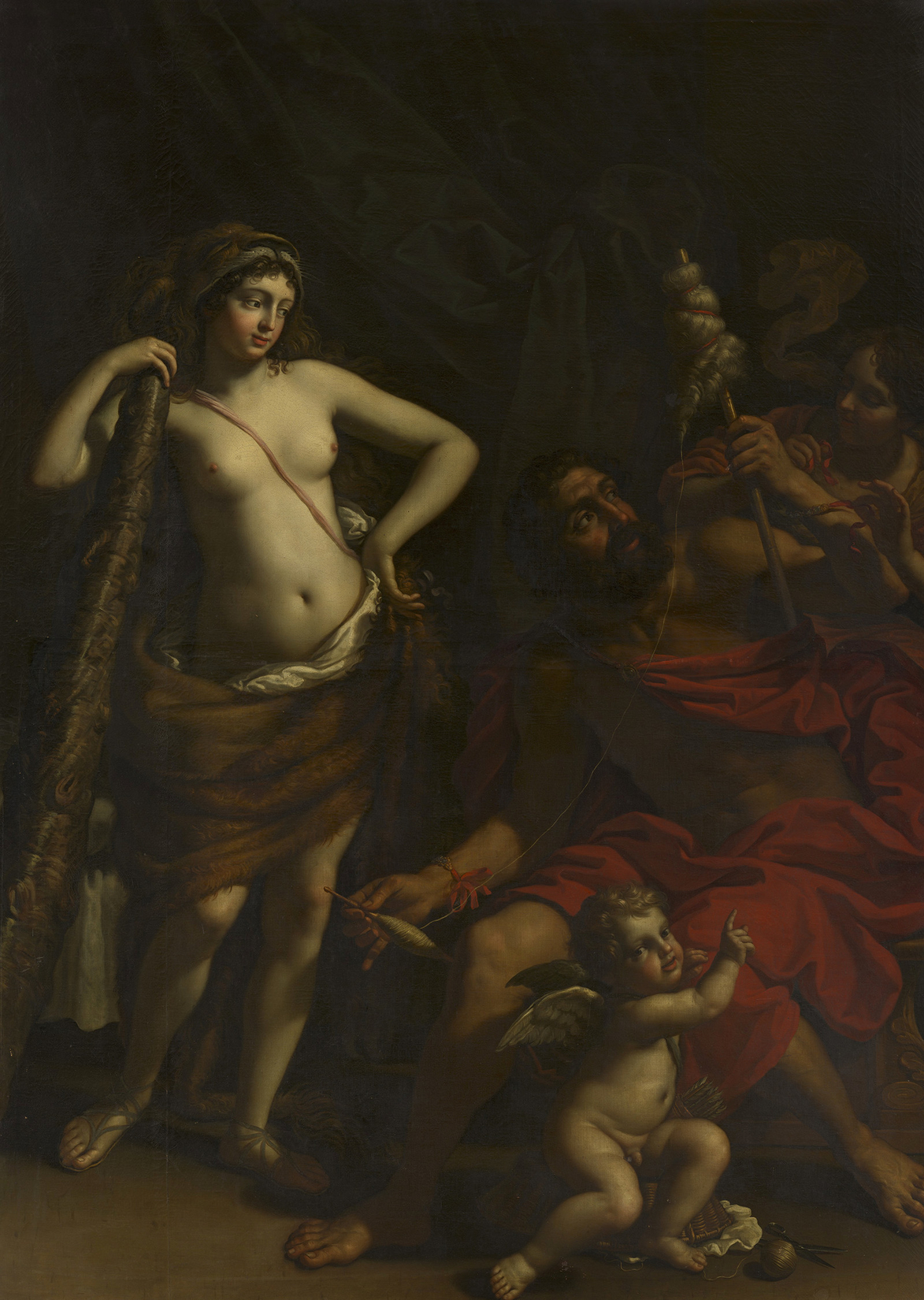
Hercules and Omphale
1675-1677

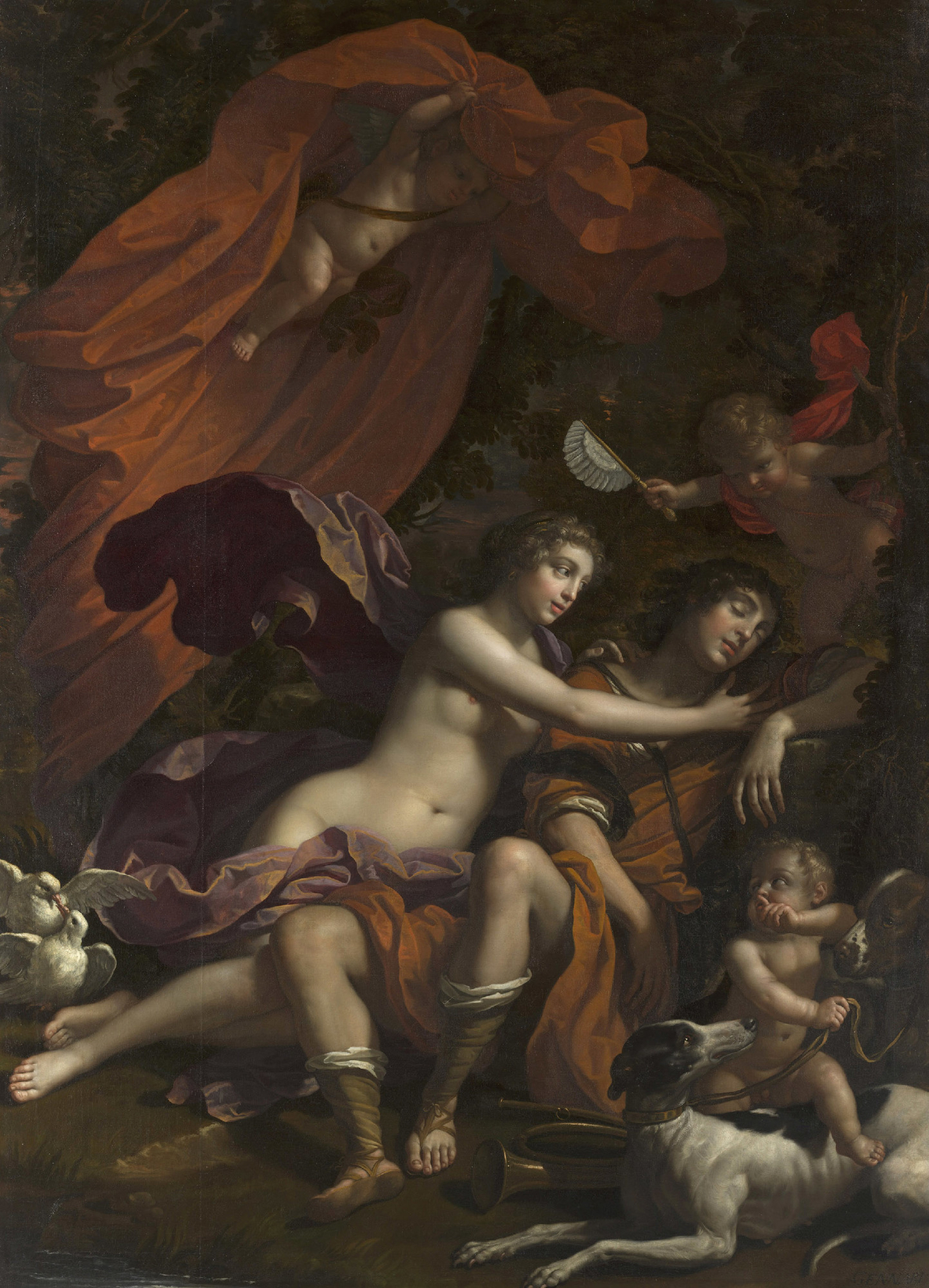
Venus and the Sleeping Adonis
1677-1678

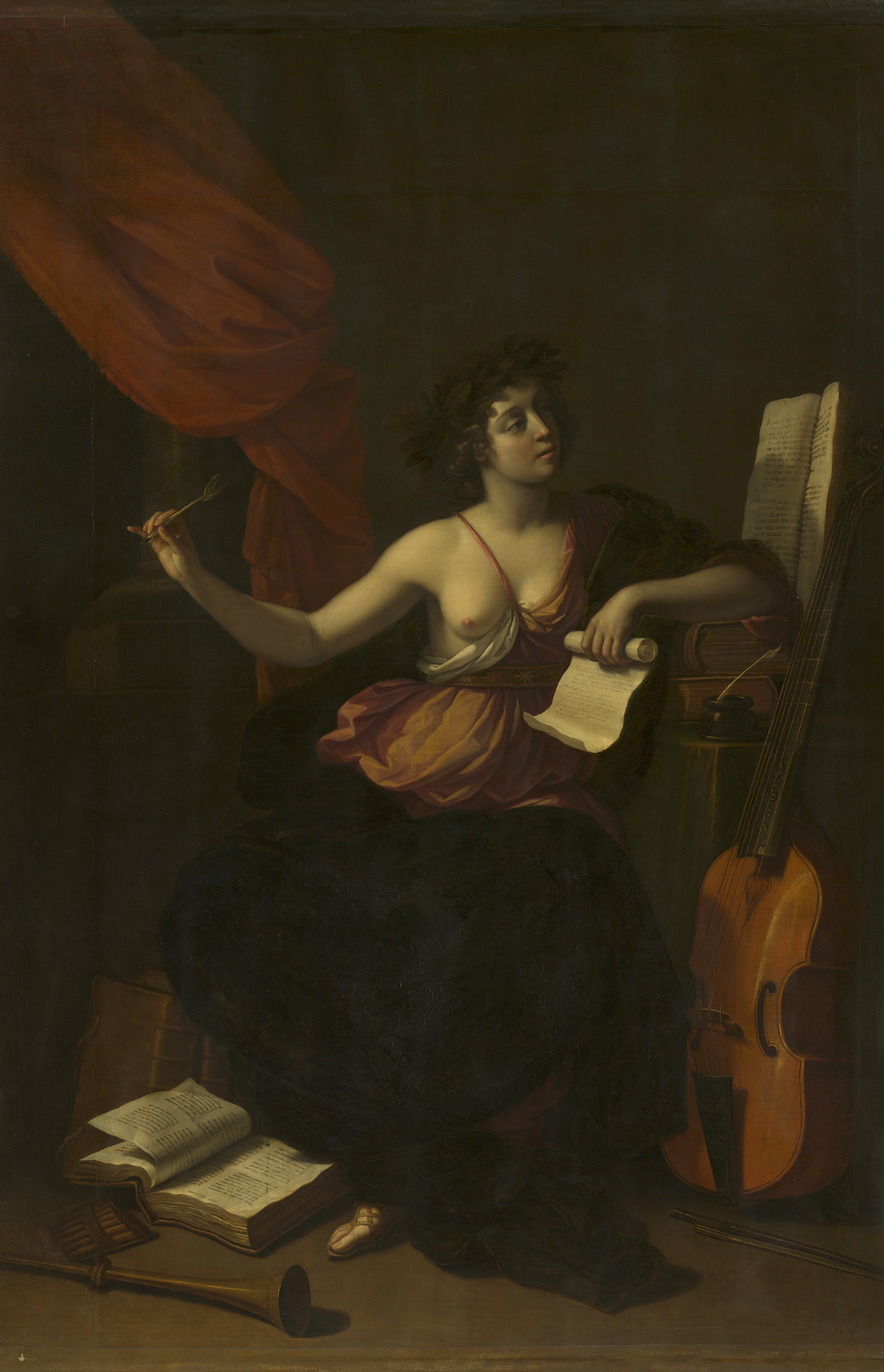
The Genius of Poetry
1680-1685

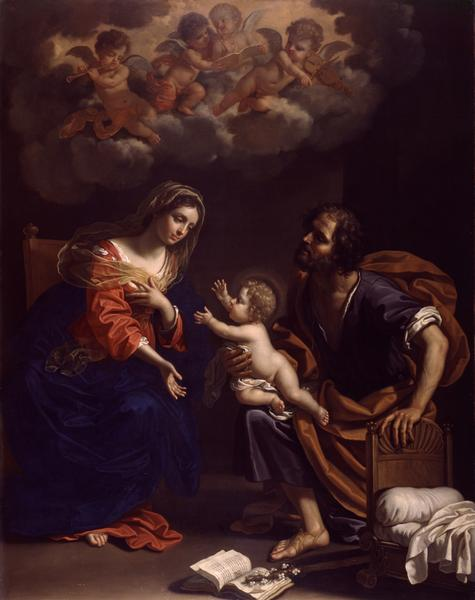
The Holy Family
1682

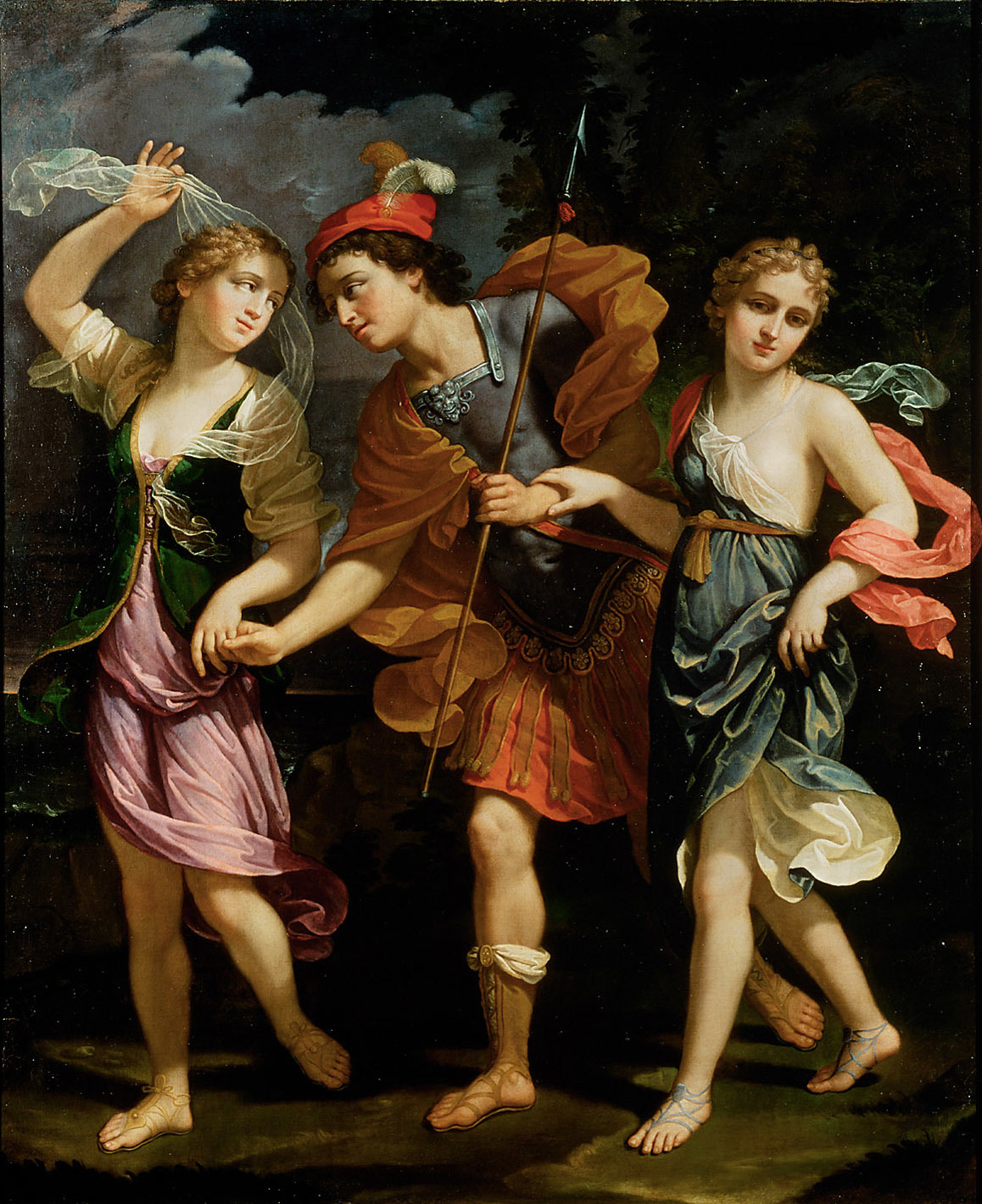
Theseus with the Daughters of Minos
1702

== See also ==
- Art collection of Fondazione Cassa di Risparmio di Cesena
