= Eugenio Morelli =

Italian physician, poet, writer, essayist and art critic

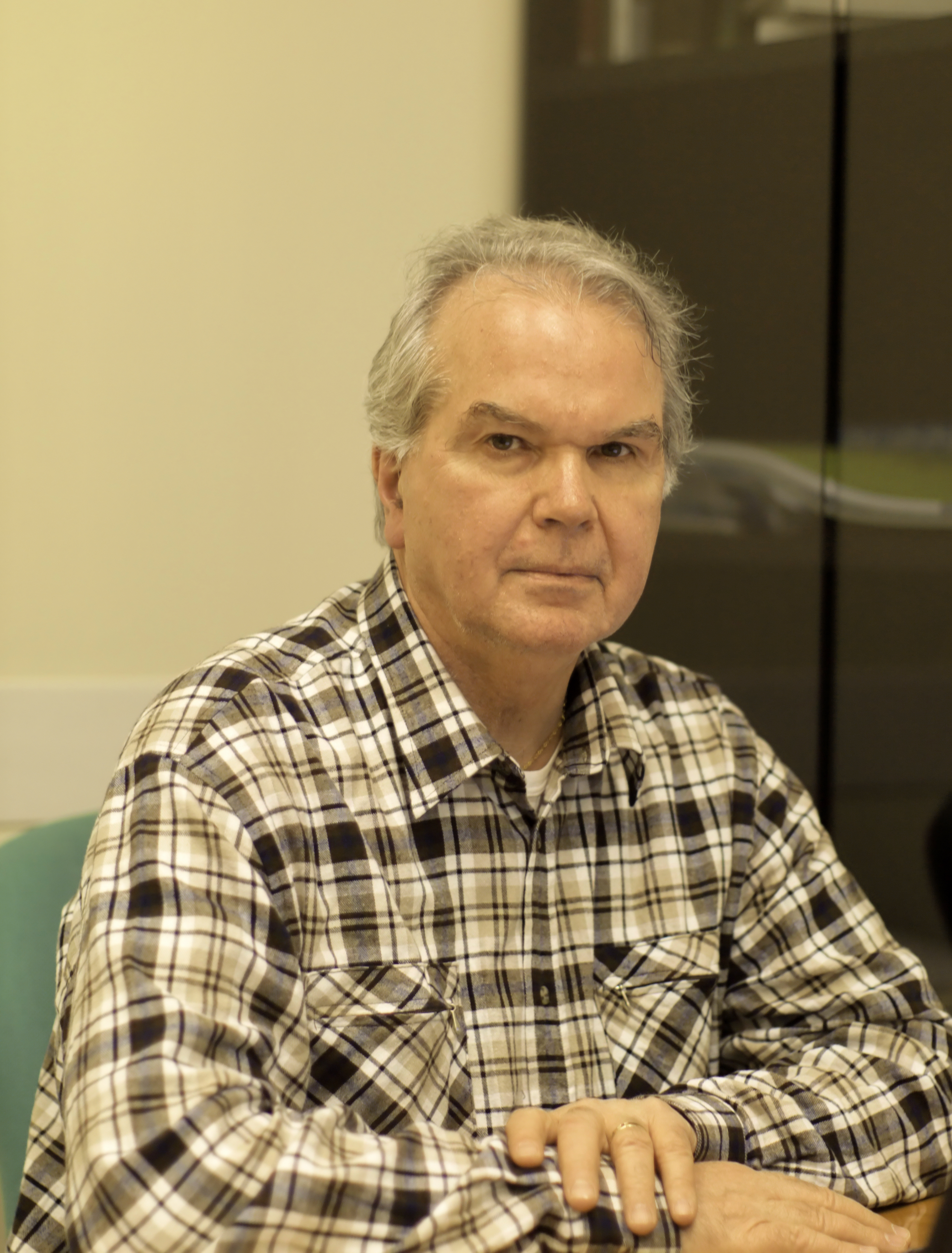
- Dr. Eugenio Morelli during a public speech in Conegliano, March 2015
- Born: Eugenio Morelli; 29 August 1946 (age 79); Trieste, Italy
- Occupations: physician, poet, writer, essayist, art critic
- Years active: 1994–present
- Awards: Award "Noi e gli altri", section 'essay-writing' 1997; Award "Lizza d'Oro" 2000; Award "Premio della cultura" 2003

Eugenio Morelli, Cavaliere OMRI, Ufficiale OMRI (Italian pronunciation: [euˈdʒɛːnjo moˈrɛlli]; born 29 August 1946) is an Italian physician, poet, writer, essayist and art critic.

== Life and career ==
Born in Trieste, Morelli studied at the University of Trieste and graduated in medicine in 1985, registering with the Medical Board one year later. Currently he lives in San Pietro di Feletto, and works as a physician in the city of Conegliano. In the spare time he cultivates a passion for what has always been his primary interest, writing, publishing each year new literary works. He also contributes to the editing of "Il Piave", a monthly magazine of the March of Treviso, and is a member of the editorial staff.

== Works ==
- Senza titolo (raccolta di aforismi), Cosenza, Casa ed. Editress, (1994).
- Cocci d'umanità, Cosenza, Casa ed. Editress, (1994).
- Vita e parole (1995).
- Il signor Nessuno - Una persona qualunque con la passione di scrivere (1997).
- Uno specchio di parole, Salerno, Edizioni Cronache Italiane, (2000).
- Un po' per vivere, un po' per morire, Salerno, Edizioni Cronache Italiane, (2000).
- L'alter ego, Salerno, Edizioni Cronache Italiane, (2001).
- Vita in casa di riposo, Salerno, Edizioni Cronache Italiane, (2002). Suggested for the International Award for Peace of Turin in 2002
- Il gioco delle combinazioni, Salerno, Edizioni Cronache Italiane, (2003).
- Non solo parole, Salerno, Edizioni Cronache Italiane, (2003).
- Giorno dopo giorno, Avellino, Casa ed. Menna, (2005).
- Frammenti di un mosaico, Avellino, Casa ed. Menna, (2006). ISBN 88-8958-831-4
- L'acqua del ruscello, Avellino, Casa ed. Menna, (2006). ISBN 88-8958-841-1
- La salute in Italia. Riflessioni di un medico, Avellino, Casa ed. Menna, (2007). ISBN 88-8958-877-2
- La sinfonia del tempo, Avellino, Casa ed. Menna, (2008). ISBN 88-8958-894-2
- Punto di riferimento, Salerno, Edizioni Cronache Italiane, (2010).
- Il cervello umano e l'imponderabile, Salerno, Edizioni Cronache Italiane, (2011).
- Viaggio nella psiche - l'umana commedia nella vita di ogni giorno, Salerno, Edizioni Cronache Italiane, (2011).
- Il pensiero negato (Raccolta di articoli), Salerno, Edizioni Cronache Italiane, (2011).
- Vita e Poesia, Salerno, Edizioni Cronache Italiane, (2012).
- Vivere e morire - un giorno come un altro, Salerno, Edizioni Cronache Italiane, (2012).
- Viaggi di Versi, numero 100, pp. 33–39, Rome, Casa ed. Pagine, (2013). ASIN B00G7VHKH2
- Pronto, guardia medica?, Salerno, Edizioni Cronache Italiane, (2013).
- Sentire, number 57, pag. 54–60, Rome, Casa ed. Pagine, (2014). ASIN B00O1JY0IE
- La solita vita, San Vendemiano, Publimedia editore, (2015).
- Il Buio e la Luce, Milan, SBF, (2015). ISBN 9786050407723. ASIN B014GAT9TW.

== Awards and honours ==
- 1997 - Award "Noi e gli altri", section 'essay-writing', ranked first
- 2000 - Award "Lizza d'Oro", ranked first
- 2003 - "Premio della Cultura" of the Presidency of the Council of the Ministers of Italy for his fiction works
- Italy 5th Class / Knight of the Order of Merit of the Italian Republic
- Italy 4th Class / Officer of the Order of Merit of the Italian Republic
- Italy Certificate of merit for the Italian Public Health
