= Benedetto Gennari =

Italian painter (1563–1610)

Benedetto Gennari (1563–1610) was an Italian painter of the early Baroque period, active mainly in Ferrara and Cento.

His birthplace is poorly recorded. He adopted a style influenced by Caravaggio, and by age 19, was working in the household of Mirandola in Cento. In that town, he helped decorate the Palazzo della Comunità and the church of Spirito Santo. Guercino became his apprentice in 1607. His nephews Benedetto II Gennari and Cesare Gennari, sons of his brother Ercole Gennari, were also painters.
