= Cento =

- Comune
- Comune di Cento
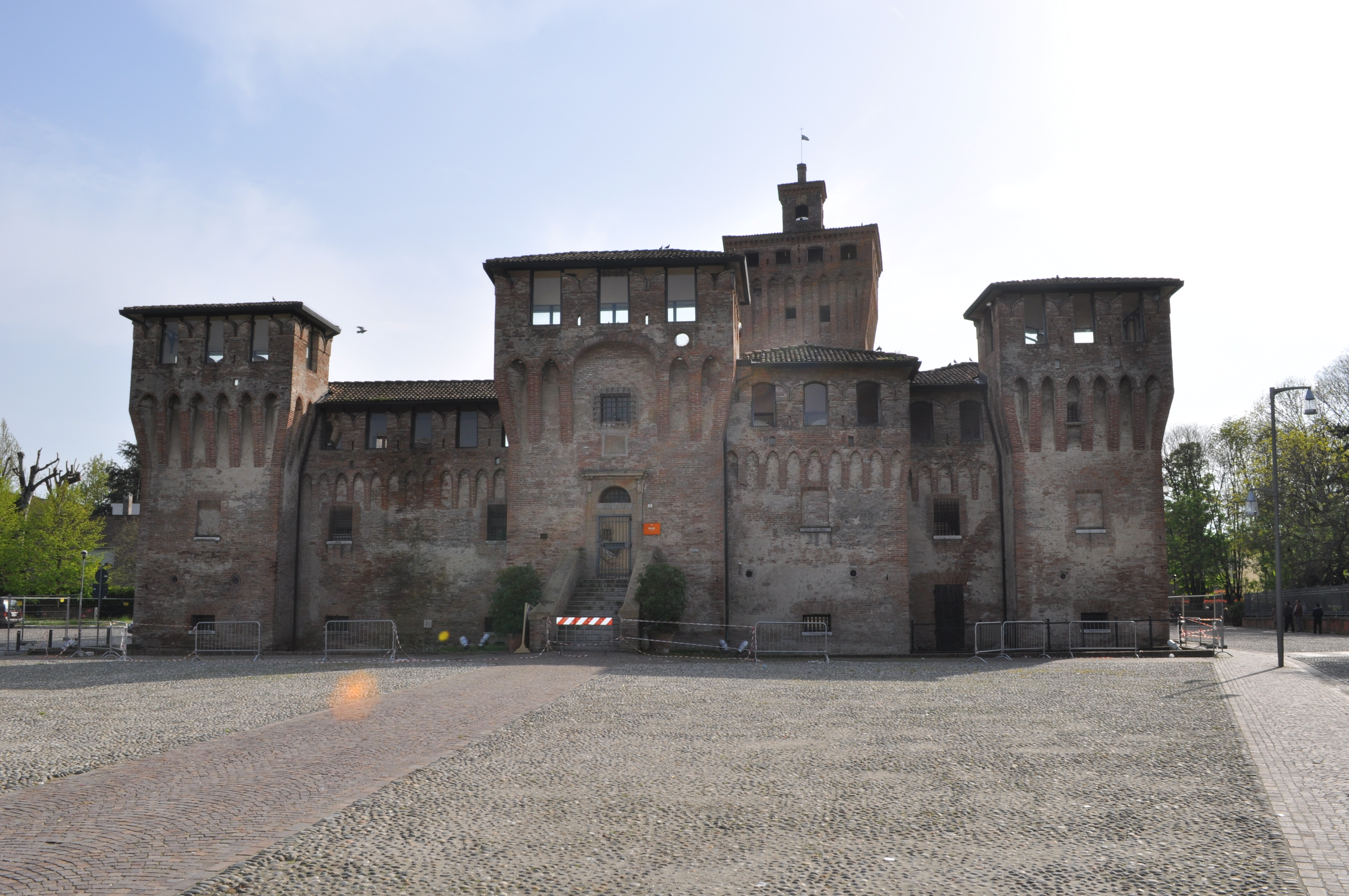
- Castle (Rocca) of Cento

- Flag Coat of arms

- Location of Cento in Italy Cento (Emilia-Romagna)
- Coordinates: 44°44′N 11°17′E
- Country: Italy
- Region: Emilia-Romagna
- Province: Ferrara (FE)
- Frazioni: Alberone, Buonacompra, Casumaro, Corporeno, Molino Albergati, Pilastrello, Renazzo, Reno Centese, XII Morelli

Government
  - Mayor: Edoardo Accorsi (PD)

Area
  - Total: 64 km^{2} (25 sq mi)
- Elevation: 15 m (49 ft)

Population (31 December 2014)
  - Total: 35,837
  - Density: 560/km^{2} (1,500/sq mi)
- Demonym: Centesi
- Time zone: UTC+1 (CET)
  - Summer (DST): UTC+2 (CEST)
- Postal code: 44042
- Dialing code: 051
- Patron saint: St. Blaise Bishop and Martyr
- Saint day: February 3
- Website: Official website

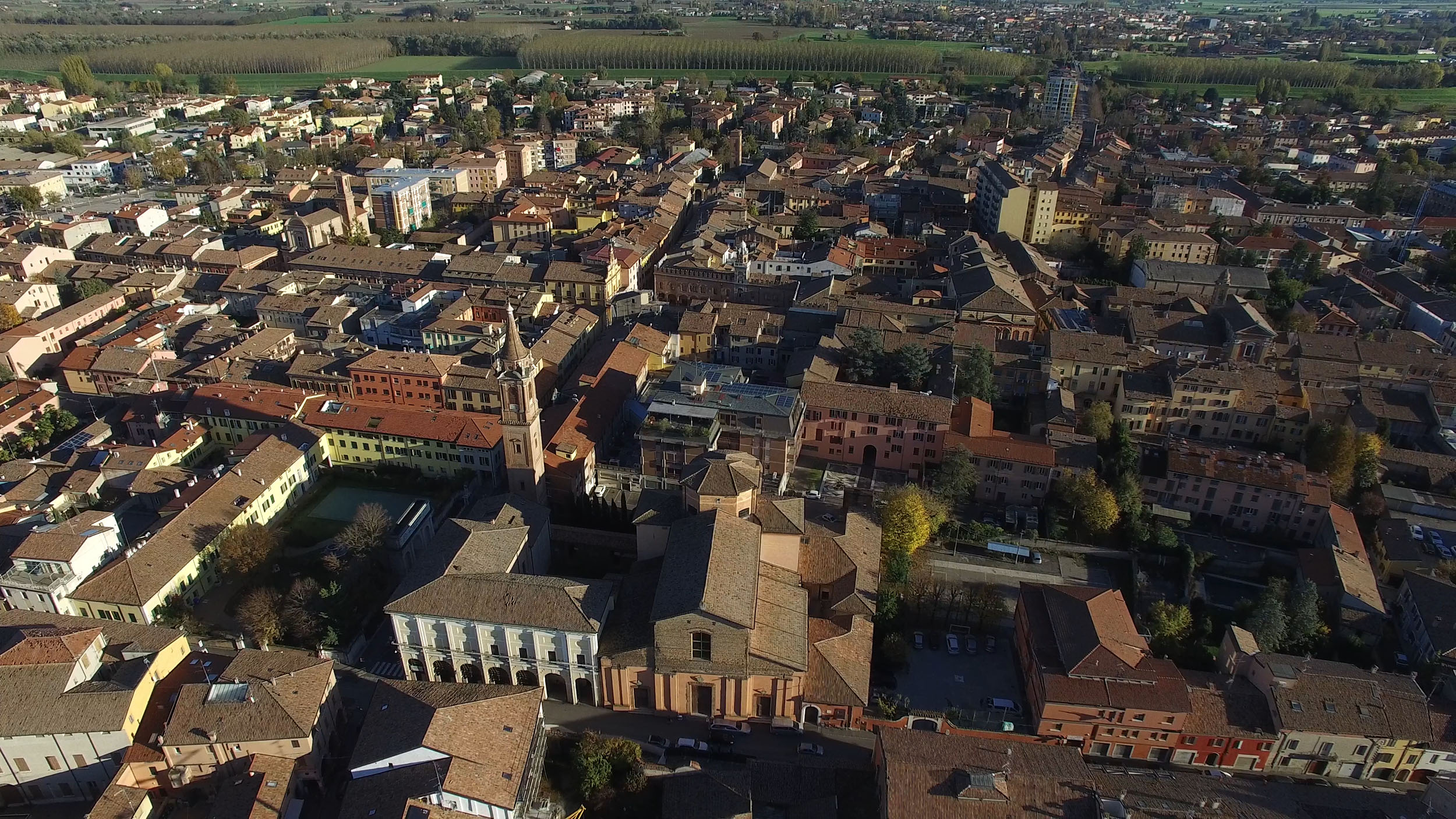
View of the historical center

Cento (Italian pronunciation: [ˈtʃɛnto]; Northern Bolognese: Zèint; City Bolognese: Zänt; Centese: Zènt) is a town and comune in the province of Ferrara, Emilia-Romagna, Italy.

== History ==
The name Cento is a reference to the centuriation of the Po Valley. Cento's growth from its origin as a little fishing village in the marshes to an established farming town took place in the first few centuries in the second millennium.

The Bishop of Bologna and the Abbot of Nonantola established the Partecipanza Agraria, an institution in which land would perpetually be redistributed every twenty years among the male heirs of the families who constituted the initial core of the community in the 12th century.

In 1502, Pope Alexander VI took it away from the dominion of the Bishop of Bologna and made it part of the dowry of his daughter Lucrezia Borgia, betrothed to Duke Alfonso I d'Este. It was later returned to the Papal States in 1598.

South-east of the city lies the small historic fortification of Pieve di Cento.

== Main sights ==
- Palazzo del Monte di Pietà (18th century), housing the Civic Gallery. It has paintings by the local artist Guercino. The latter's works can be seen also in the Basilica Collegiata San Biagio, Santa Maria dei Servi, the church of the Rosary, also designed by him, and, in the frazione of Corporeno, the 14th-century church of San Giorgio.
- The Rocca (Castle), a massive square building with square towers. Built in 1378 by the bishop of Bologna, it was enlarged by Giulio della Rovere, the future pope Julius II, in 1460.
- Palazzo del Governatore (Governor's Palace, 1502). It is home to the Galleria d'arte moderna Aroldo Bonzagni.
- Porta Pieve (14th century), the sole surviving gate of the four once existing.
- Santa Maria Maddalena, Baroque style 17th-century Roman Catholic church
- Santa Maria Addolorata, Renaissance style church begun in 1590

== Culture ==
Cento is the European's city of Carnival and it is twinned with Rio carnival.

== People ==
- Giuseppe Alberghini, cardinal
- Corrado Ardizzoni, Olympic cyclist
- Giovan Francesco Barbieri best known as "Guercino", painter
- Ugo Bassi, patriot
- Aroldo Bonzagni, painter
- Giuseppe Borgatti, tenor
- Bartolomeo Campagnoli, violinist
- Leone Carpi, political, economist and journalist
- Cesare Cremonini, philosopher
- Benjamin D'Israeli, grandfather of British politician and Prime Minister Benjamin Disraeli
- Benedetto Gennari, painter
- Benedetto Gennari II, painter
- Bartolomeo Gennari, painter
- Cesare Gennari, painter
- Ercole Gennari, painter
- Ferruccio Lamborghini, industrialist
- Carmen Lenzi Mozzani, classical guitarist
- Mario Maccaferri, classical guitarist, lutist as well as guitar and ukulele maker
- Giovanni Malagodi, politician and economist
- Luigi Mozzani, classical guitarist as well as guitar and violin maker
- Jessica Rossi, sports shooter
- Antonio Lamberto Rusconi, cardinal
- Marco Zoppo, painter

== Trivia ==
The nearby center of Renazzo is known in the astronomical community because of the Renazzo meteorite, which fell in 1824 and it is considered the prototype of a class of carbonaceous chondrites known as "CR group" (where the "R" comes from the name Renazzo).

== International relations ==
Cento is twinned with:

- L'Aquila, Italy
- Székesfehérvár, Hungary
- Vicente Lopez, Argentina
