= Cesare Gennari =

Italian painter (1637–1688)

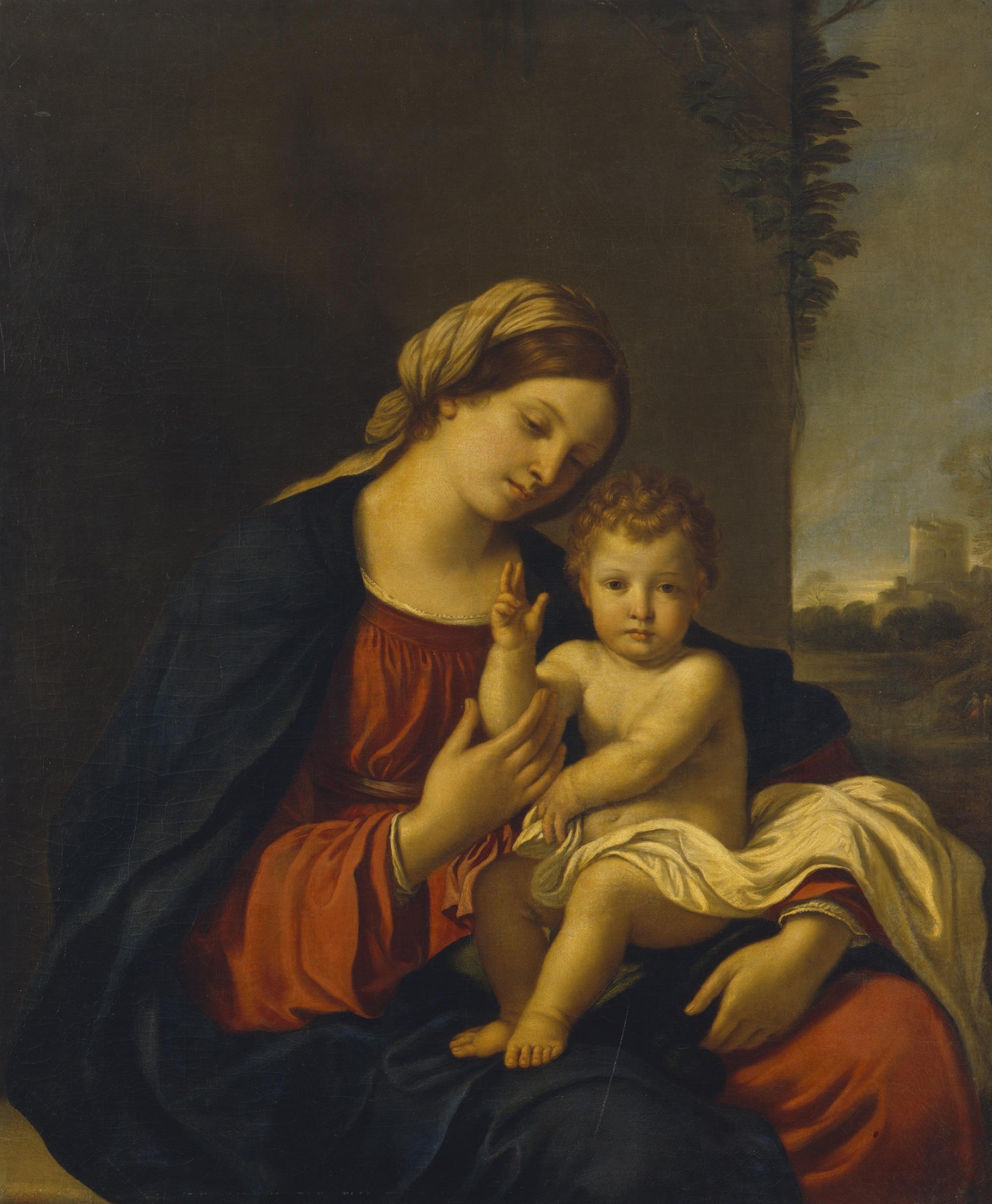
- Cesare Gennari, Madonna and Child, Hermitage Museum
- Born: Cesare Gennari; 12 December 1637; Cento, Italy
- Died: 11 February 1688 (aged 50); Bologna, Italy
- Known for: Painting
- Movement: Baroque

Cesare Gennari (12 December 1637 – 11 February 1688) was an Italian painter of the Baroque period. His Saint Mary Magdalene is in the Pinacoteca Civica di Cento. His Apparition of the Virgin to Saint Nicholas of Bari is at the Pinacoteca di Bologna.

In his later work, Cesare "shed all traces of Guercinesque idiom, adopting instead the courtly accents of St James's and Saint-Germain".

== Biography ==
Son of Ercole Gennari and born at Cento, he was trained in the studio of his maternal uncle, Giovanni Francesco Barbieri called "Guercino", in Bologna. Cesare's uncle, Benedetto Gennari, and his brother, Benedetto II Gennari (1633–1715), were also painters in the circle of Guercino. Cesare and the younger Benedetto were heirs of Guercino's studio, papers and effects, preserved for some time at Casa Gennari, Bologna.

He married Francesca Ripa and had two sons, Gianfrancesco and Filippo. Among his pupils was Ercole Gaetano Bertuzzi.

== Sources ==
- Hobbes, James R. (1849). Picture collector's manual adapted to the professional man, and the amateur. London: T&W Boone. p. 110.
- "Gennari, Cesare (Italian painter, 1637-1688)". Union List of Artist Names. 500002017.
