= Saint Joseph's Dream (Guercino) =

Painting by Guercino

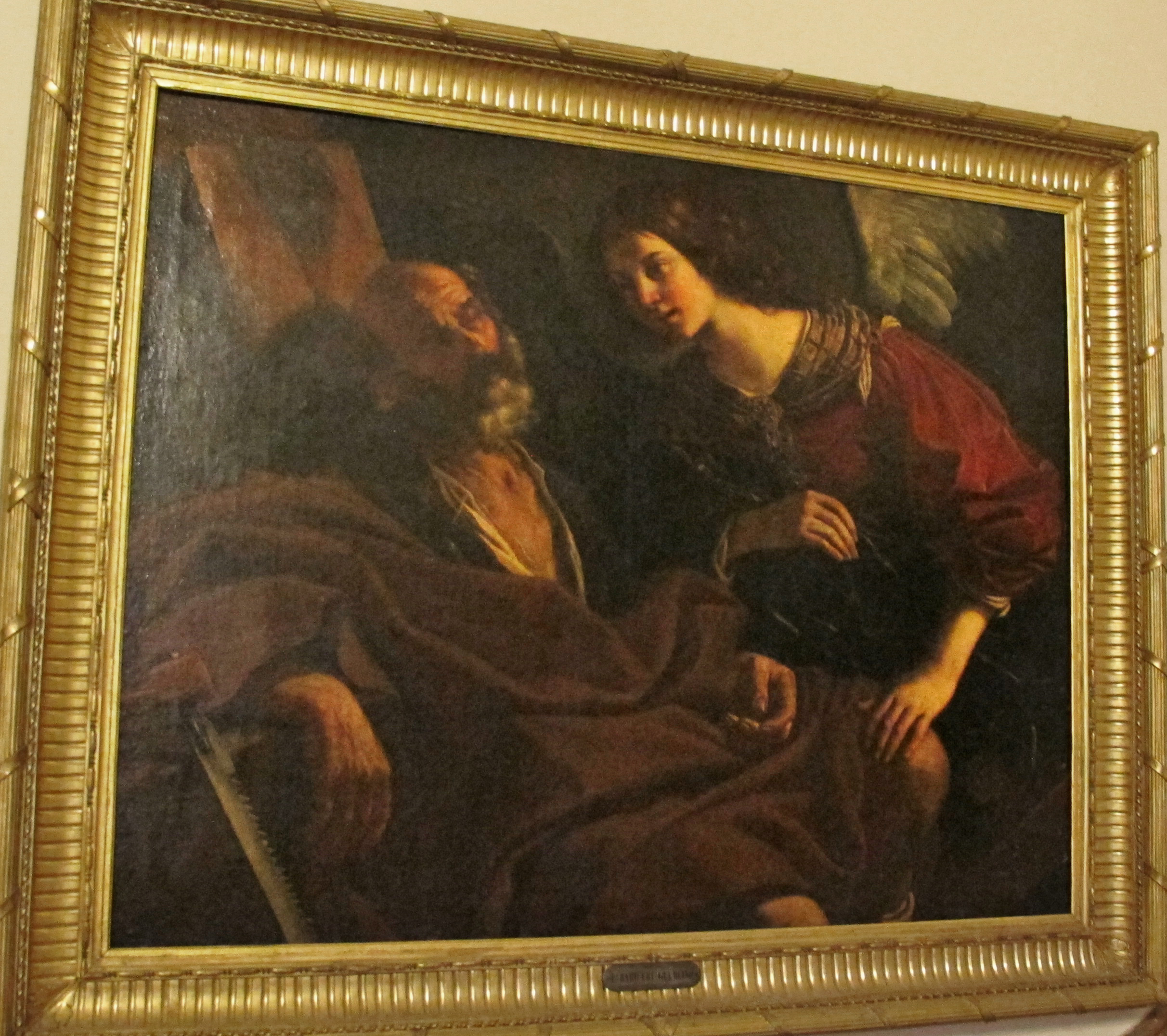
Saint Joseph's Dream by Guercino

Saint Joseph's Dream is an oil-on-canvas painting executed ca. 1615–1650 by the Italian Baroque artist Guercino, now in the Royal Palace of Naples.

== History ==
It may be a pendant to Guercino's Saint Jerome, also now in the Palace. It was moved from Parma to Naples with the rest of the Farnese collection in 1734 when the Kingdom of Naples was inherited by Charles of Bourbon. It was recorded in an inventory of the Palace's collections in 1874 but later fell into obscurity.

At the end of the twentieth century it was rediscovered and re-evaluated by critics, who identified it in the abbey of Montevergine in Avellino, where there was also the Saint Jerome, as a work from the deposits of Capodimonte under the attribution to Francesco Di Maria.
