= Benedetto Zallone =

Italian painter (1595–1644)

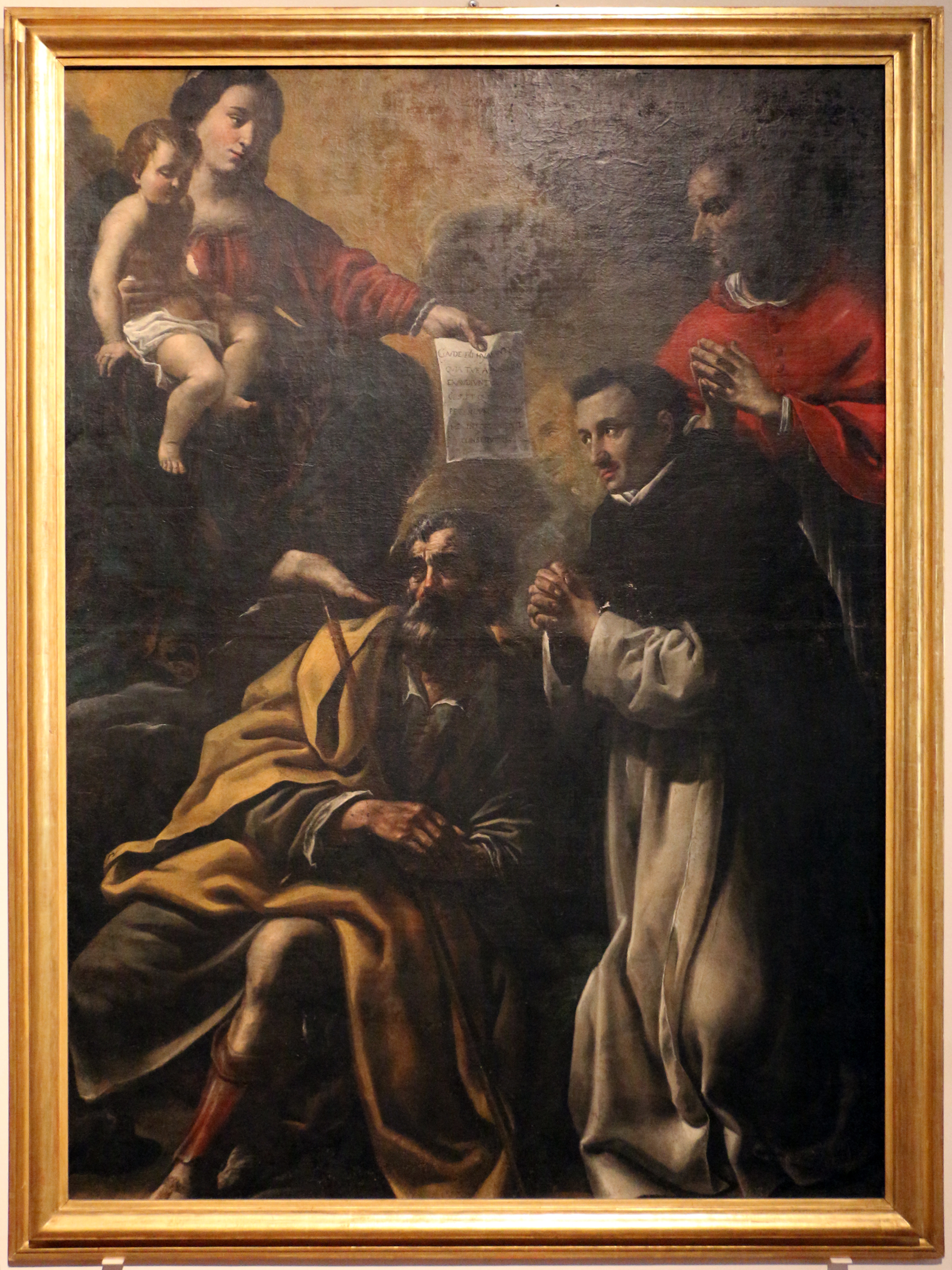

Benedetto Zallone, or also called Zalone da Cento, (1595–1644) was an Italian painter of the Baroque period. He mainly painted religious subjects. He was born in Pieve di Cento. He was a pupil of Guercino. He worked in Rome and Cento. His name of Zalone was attributed to his appearance. In Cento, he painted a St Matthew and the Virgin for the church of San Agostino and St Gregory with Saints for San Pietro. Some of his works are now collected in the Pinacoteca of Pieve di Cento.
