= San Pietro, Cento =

Church in Italy

Coordinates: 44°43′34.7″N 11°17′30.2″E

San Pietro is a Gothic style, Roman Catholic church located on Via Cremonino in Cento, Province of Ferrara, Region of Emilia-Romagna, Italy.

== History ==
Construction of the church began before the 1300s, and it was the second oldest parish in Cento. It was attached initially to the Franciscan order. In 1749, it became a parish church, a role for which for some time it shared with the nearby church of San Rocco.

The church underwent numerous refurbishments and contains works by Lucio Massari: Crucifixion and Saints; Guercino: Virgin in Glory with Saints Bonaventure, Francis, and donor; and a Madonna and Child, Saints and Guardian Angel. Due to the 2012 Northern Italy earthquakes, the church was closed for reconstruction. The church once contained a painting depicting a Dead Christ, now in the Pinacoteca di Cento, attributed to Matteo Loves.

== See also ==
- Cento
