= Country Concert =

Painting by Guercino

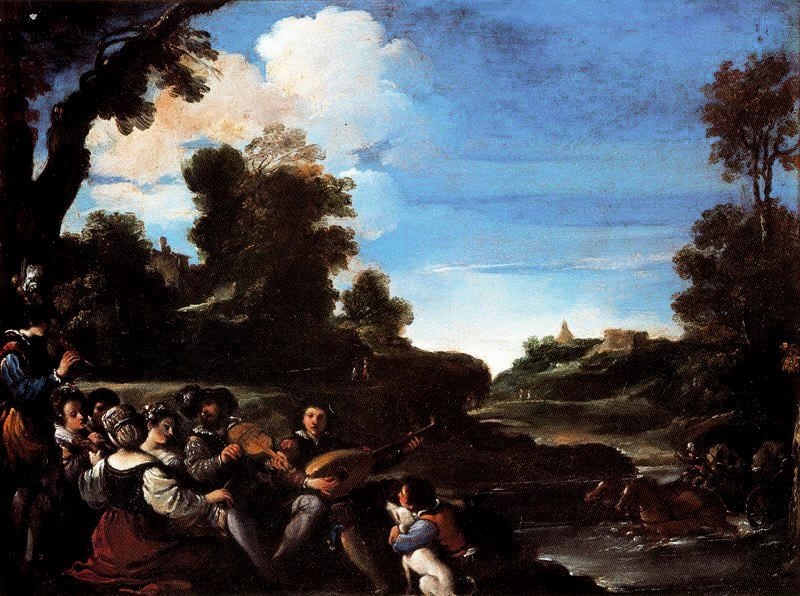
Country Concert (c. 1617) by Guercino

Country Concert is an oil-on-canvas painting executed c. 1617 by the Italian artist Guercino. It is now in the Uffizi Gallery in Florence. It is considered a rare instance of pure pastoral landscape in his oeuvre.
