= Matteo Loves =

Italian painter

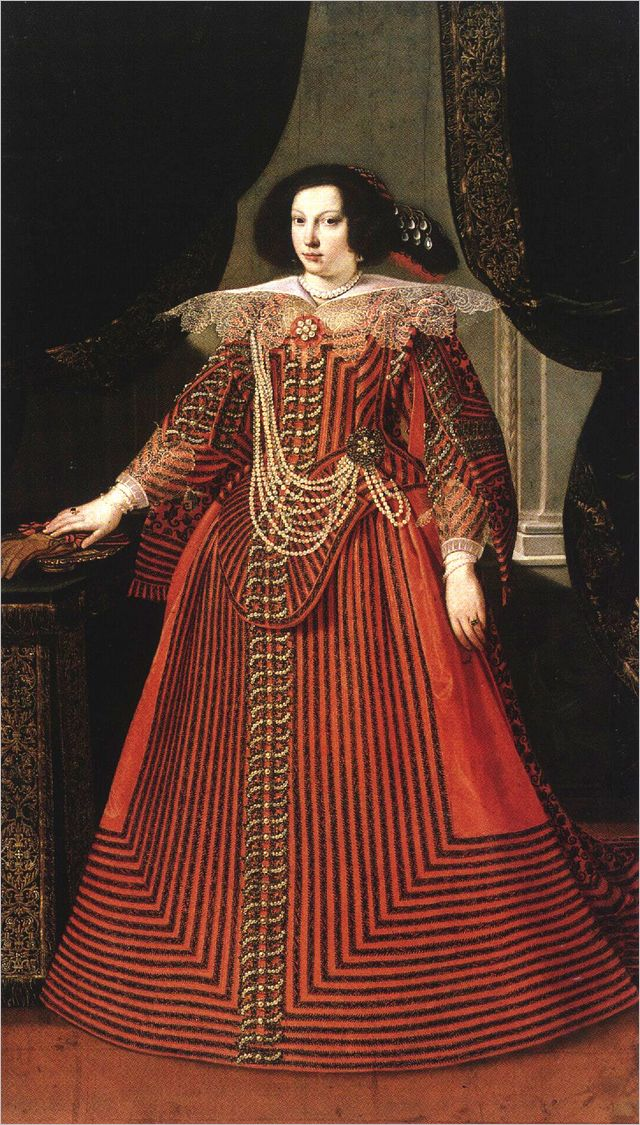
Portrait of Duchessa Maria Caterina Farnese, Museo di Arte e Storia of Geneva

Matteo Loves was a painter active in Cento from about 1625 to 1662. Few biographical details are known. It is said he was born in Cologne to an English family, and arrived as a young man in Cento, where he trained with Guercino. Works by Loves can be found in the Pinacoteca of Cento and in the church of San Rocco e San Sebastiano.
