= Saint Jerome (Guercino) =

Painting by Guercino

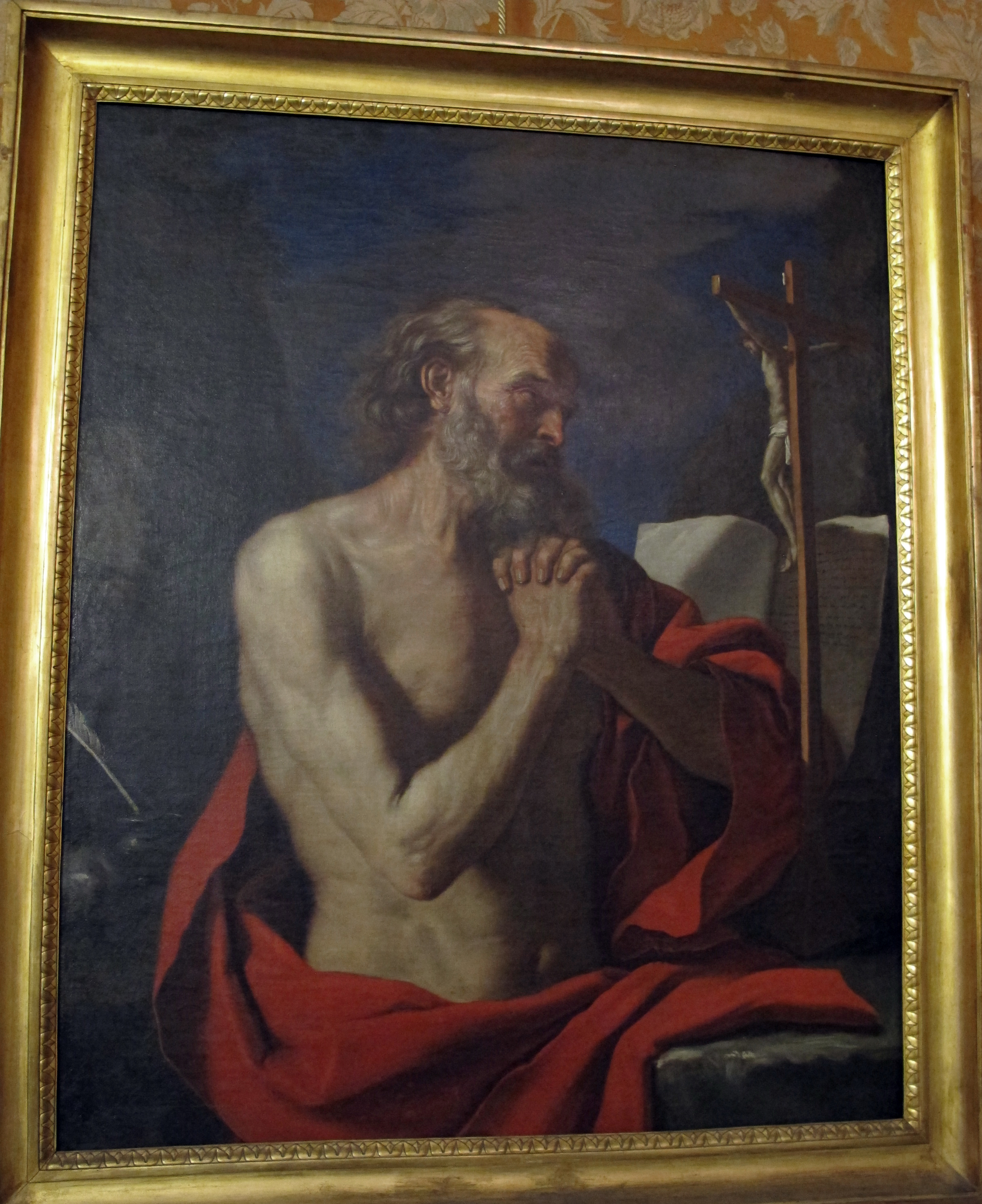
Saint Jerome (c. 1640–1650) by Guercino

Saint Jerome or Penitent Saint Jerome is an oil-on-canvas painting executed c.1640–1650 by the Italian artist Guercino, now in the Royal Palace of Naples.

== History ==
Its origins are unknown. Twentieth-century art critics argue it was commissioned by someone featured in the painter's accounts book. The work dates to 1640–1650, a period when patrons from Cento, Ferrara and Bologna were commissioning works from him for sums between around 50 and 67 scudi.

The earliest definite reference to the work dates to 1680, when it was recorded at the Palazzo del Giardino in Parma as part of the Farnese collection, though it is unknown how it entered that collection. In 1734, before being moved to Naples, the Jerome was recorded as being at the Ducal Palace in Parma. When Elisabeth Farnese's son Charles of Bourbon came to the throne of the Two Sicilies, it and the rest of the Farnese collection was moved to Naples. The work was then largely forgotten before being re-evaluated at the end of the 20th century.
