= Guercino =

Italian Baroque artist (1591–1666)

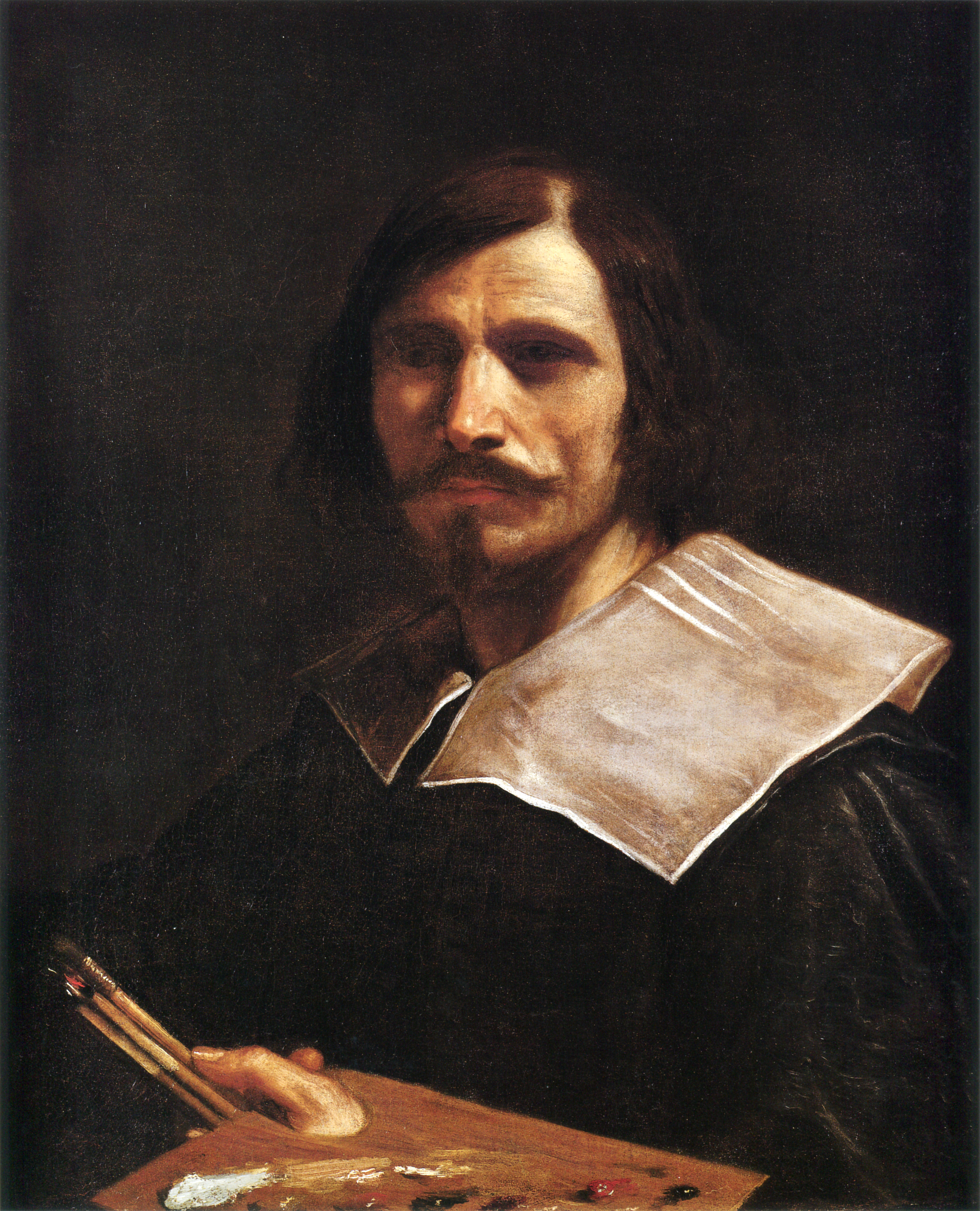
- Self-Portrait, c. 1635; Louvre
- Born: Giovanni Francesco Barbieri; February 8, 1591; Cento, Duchy of Ferrara
- Died: December 22, 1666 (aged 75); Bologna, Papal States
- Known for: Painting, drawing
- Movement: Baroque

Giovanni Francesco Barbieri (8 February 1591 – 22 December 1666), better known as (il) Guercino (Italian pronunciation: [ɡwerˈtʃiːno]), was an Italian Baroque painter and draftsman from Cento in the Emilia region, who was active in Rome and Bologna. The vigorous naturalism of his early manner contrasts with the classical equilibrium of his later works. His many drawings are noted for their luminosity and lively style.

== Biography ==
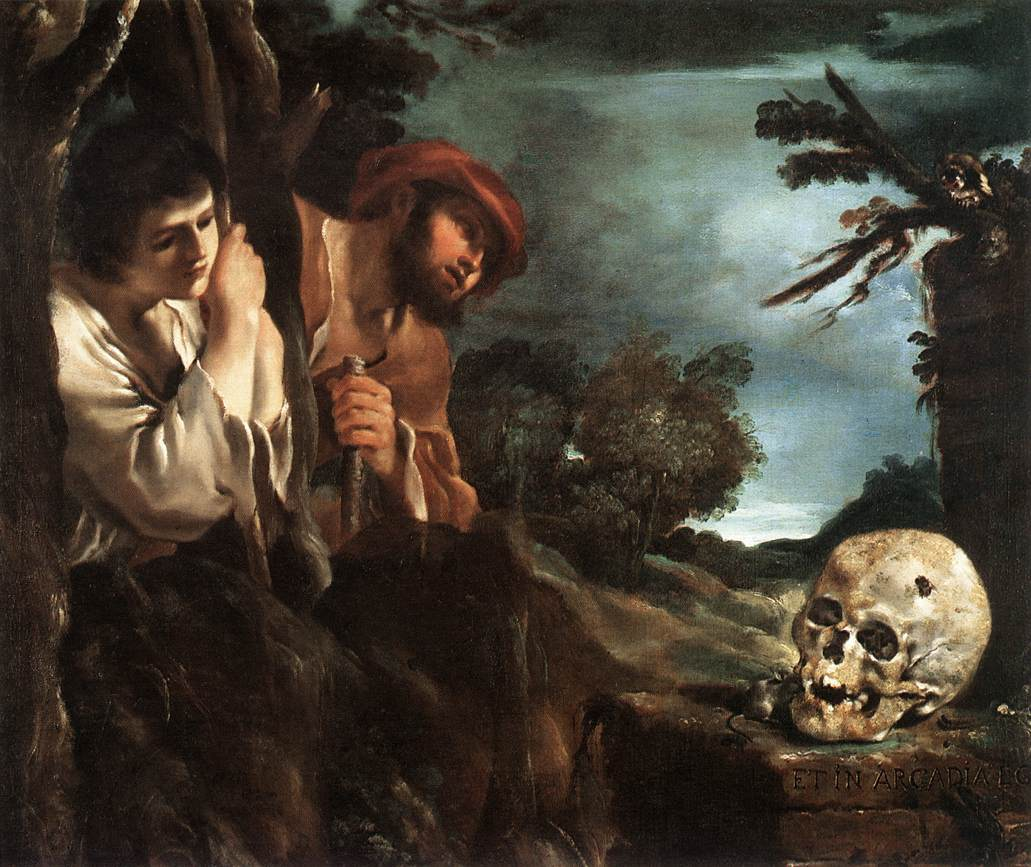
The dramatic confrontation with mortality depicted in Guercino's Et in Arcadia ego (c. 1618–1622) marks the first known usage of this Latin motto (inscribed on the plinth beneath the skull).

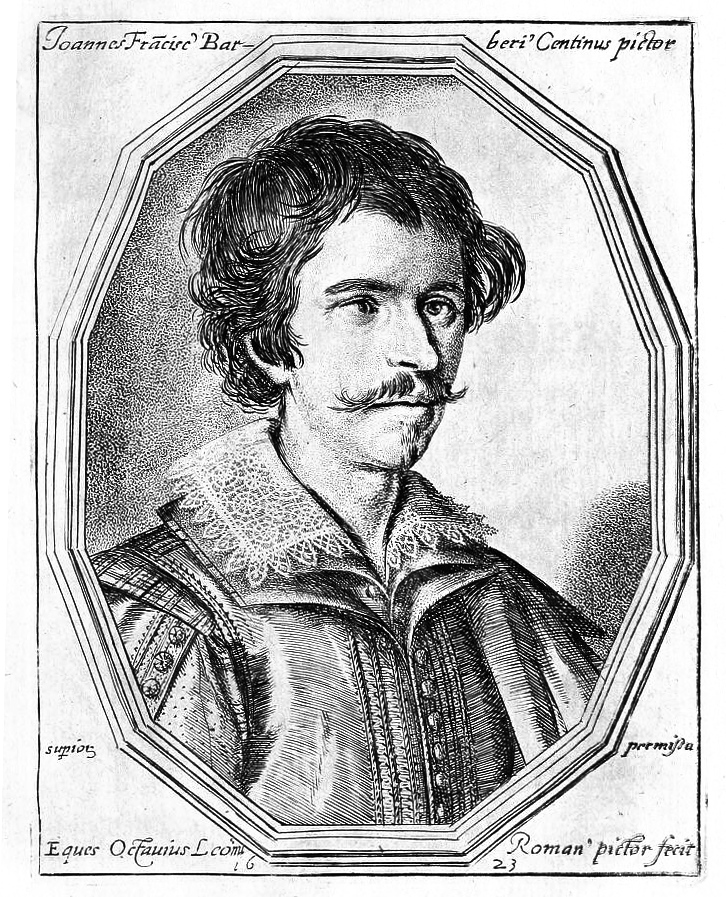
This contemporary portrait (1623) by Ottavio Leoni highlights the lifelong squint (a form of strabismus) which prompted the name 'Guercino'.

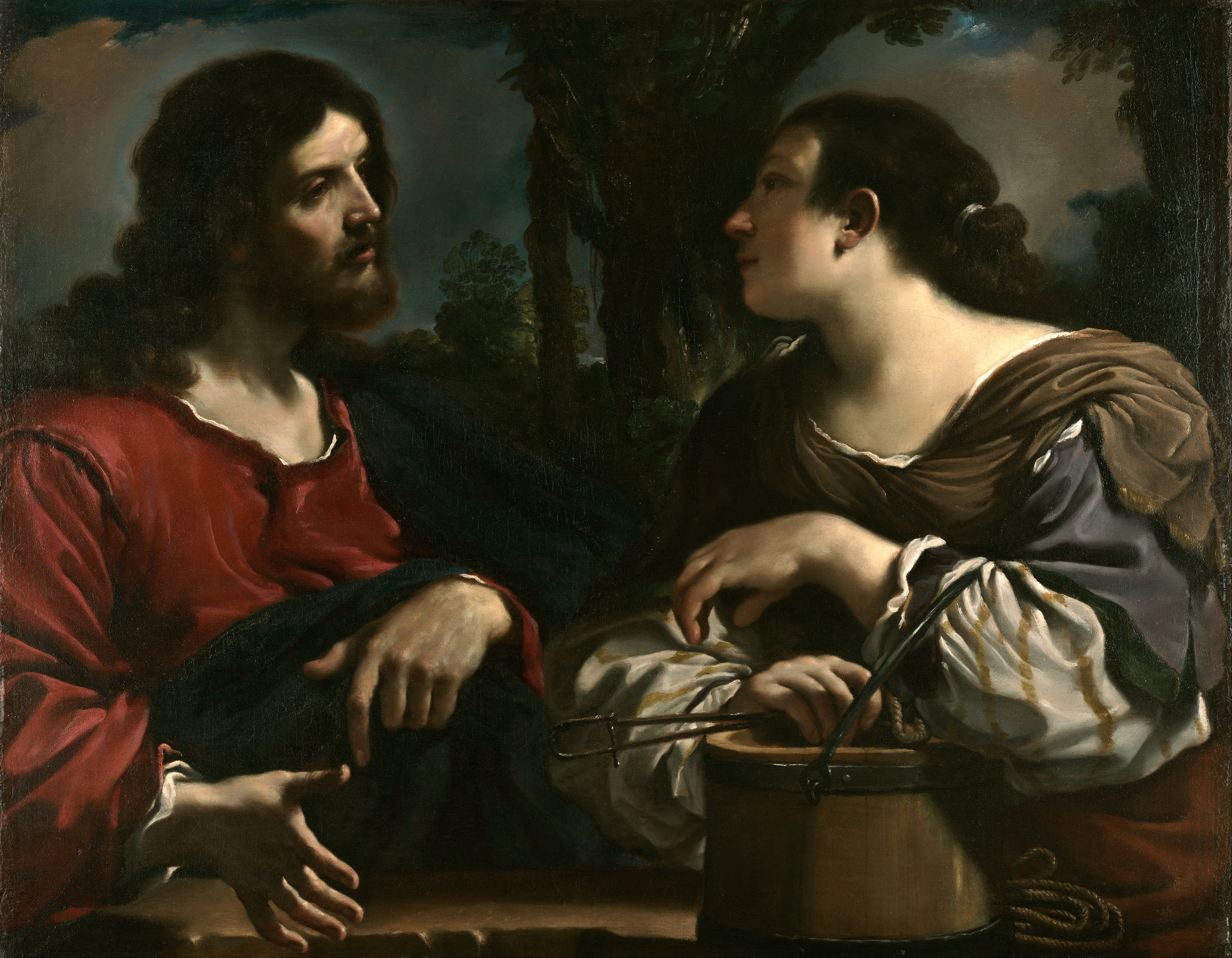
Caravaggio's influence is apparent in this canvas Christ and the Woman of Samaria (c. 1619–1620).

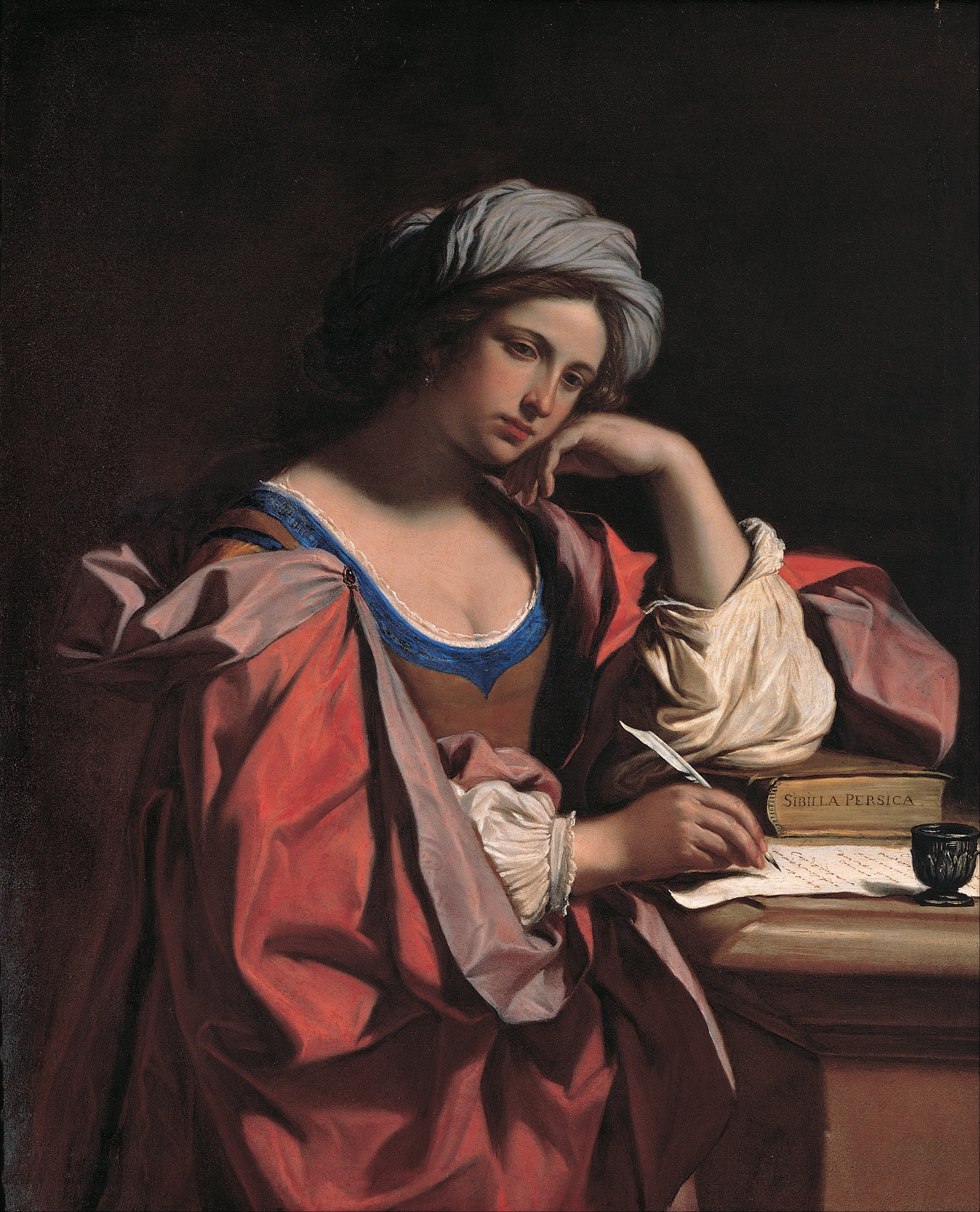
Guercino – The Persian Sibyl (1647–48)

Giovanni Francesco Barbieri was born into a family of peasant farmers in Cento, a town in the Po Valley mid-way between Bologna and Ferrara. Being cross-eyed, at an early age he acquired the nickname by which he is universally known, Guercino (a diminutive of the Italian noun guercio, meaning 'squinter'). Mainly self-taught, at the age of 16, he worked as apprentice in the shop of Benedetto Gennari, a painter of the Bolognese School. An early commission was for the decoration with frescoes (1615–1616) of Casa Pannini in Cento, where the naturalism of his landscapes already reveals considerable artistic independence, as do his landscapes on canvas Moonlit Landscape and Country Concert from the same era. In Bologna, he won the praise of Ludovico Carracci. He always acknowledged that his early style had been influenced by study of a Madonna painted by Ludovico Carracci for the Capuchin church in Cento, affectionately known as "La Carraccina".

St William Receiving the Monastic Habit (1620, Pinacoteca Nazionale di Bologna, Italy), painted for Santi Gregorio e Siro in Bologna, was Guercino's largest ecclesiastical commission at the time and is considered a high point of his early career.

His painting Et in Arcadia ego from around 1618–1622 contains the first known usage anywhere of the Latin motto, later taken up by Poussin and others, signifying that death lurks even in the most idyllic setting. The dramatic composition of this canvas (related to his Flaying of Marsyas by Apollo (1617–1618) created for Cosimo II de' Medici, Grand Duke of Tuscany, which shares the same pair of shepherds) is typical of Guercino's early works, which are often tumultuous in conception. He painted two large canvases, Samson Seized by Philistines (1619) and Elijah Fed by Ravens (1620), for Cardinal Giacomo Serra, a Papal Legate to Ferrara. Painted at a time when it is unlikely that Guercino could have seen Caravaggio's work in Rome, these works nevertheless display a starkly naturalistic Caravaggesque style.

== Rome ==
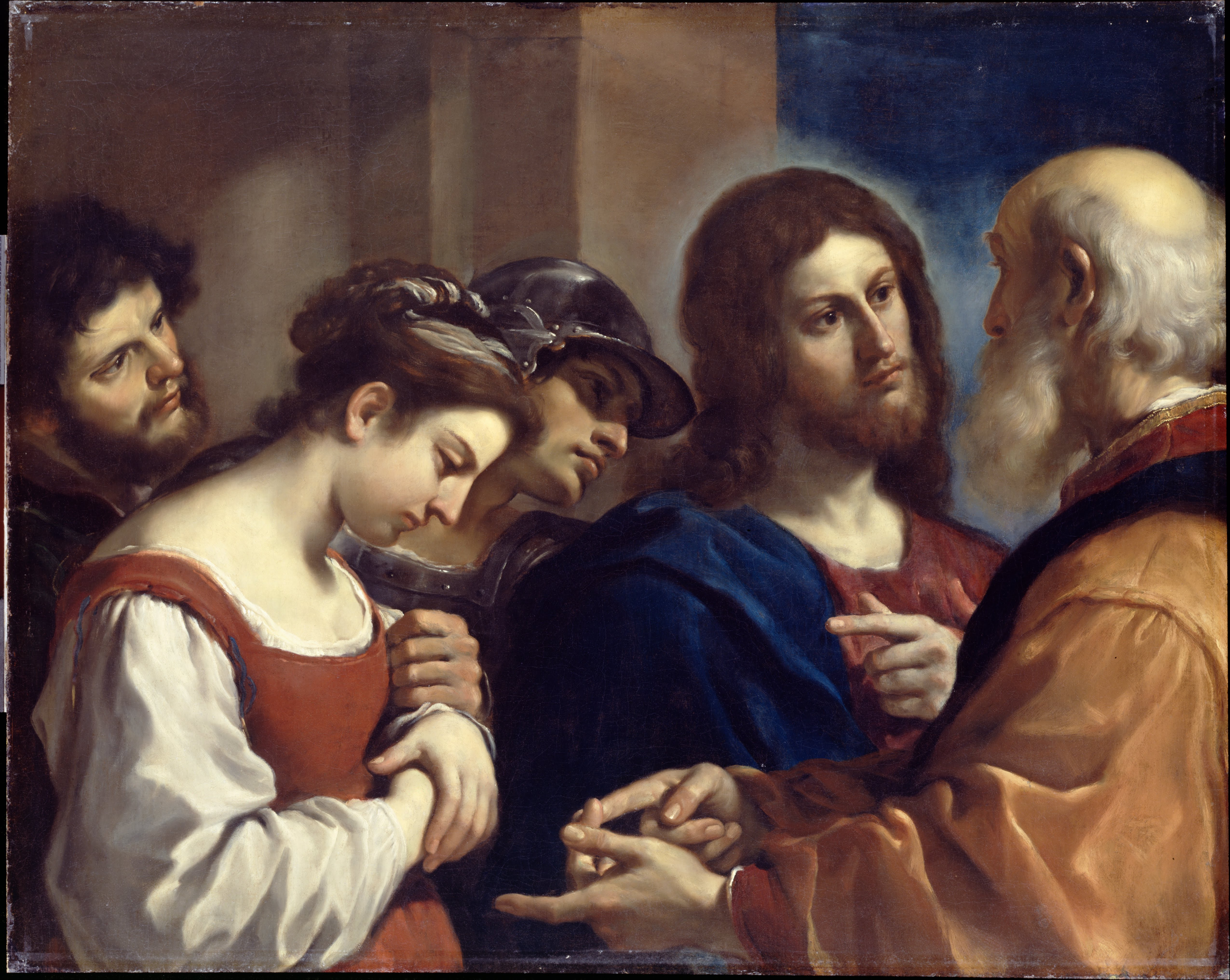
Guercino – The Woman taken in Adultery, Dulwich Picture Gallery (1621)

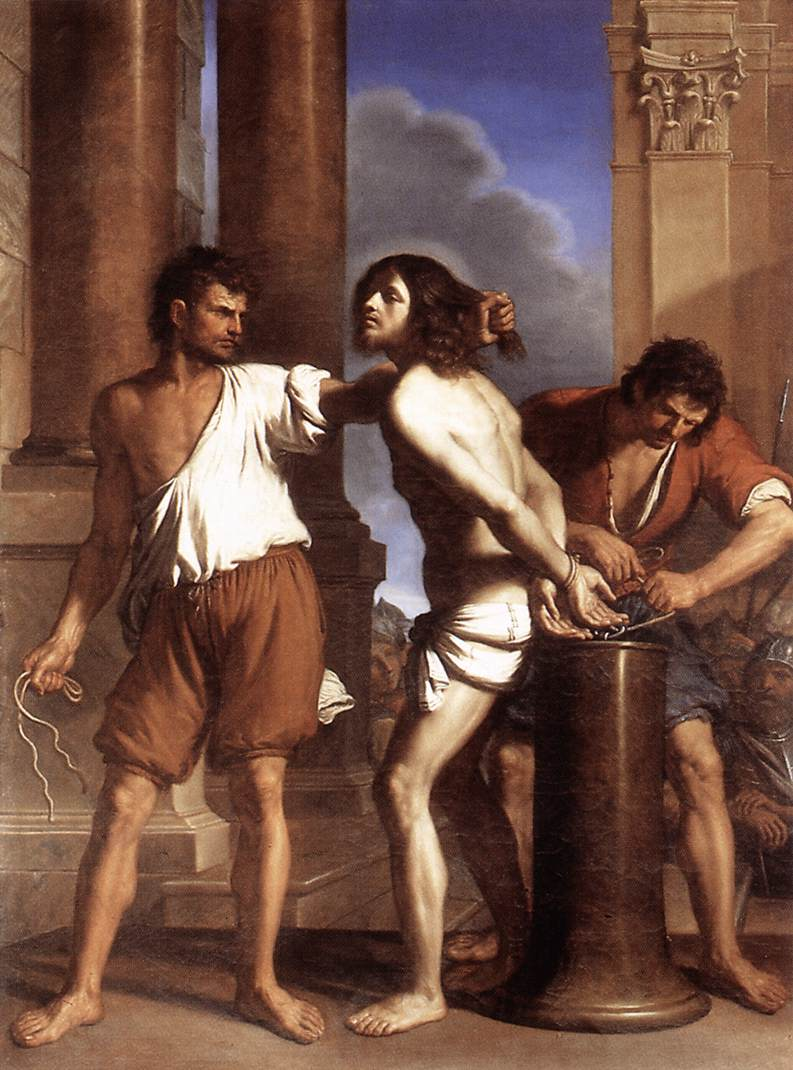
Guercino – Flagellation of Christ (1657)

Guercino was recommended by Marchese Enzo Bentivoglio to the newly elected Bolognese Ludovisi Pope, Pope Gregory XV in 1621. The years he spent in Rome, 1621–23, were very productive. From this period are his frescoes Aurora at the casino of the Villa Ludovisi, the ceiling in San Crisogono (1622) of San Chrysogonus in Glory, the portrait of Pope Gregory XV (now in the Getty Museum), and the St. Petronilla Altarpiece for St. Peter's Basilica in the Vatican (now in the Capitoline Museums).

== Return to Bologna ==
Following the death of Gregory XV in 1623, Guercino returned to his hometown of Cento. In 1626, he began his frescoes in Piacenza Cathedral. The details of his career after 1629 are well documented in the account book, the Libro dei Conti di Casa Barbieri, that Guercino and his brother Paolo Antonio Barbieri, a notable painter of still lifes, kept updated, and which has been preserved. Between 1618 and 1631, Giovanni Battista Pasqualini produced 67 engravings that document the early production of Guercino, which is not included in the Libro dei Conti. In 1642, following the death of his commercial rival Guido Reni, Guercino moved his busy workshop to Bologna, where he was now able to take over Reni's role as the city's leading painter of sacred subjects. In 1655, the Franciscan Order of Reggio paid him 300 ducats for the altarpiece of Saint Luke Displaying a Painting of the Madonna and Child (now in Nelson-Atkins Museum of Art, Kansas City). The Corsini family also paid him 300 ducats for the Flagellation of Christ painted in 1657.

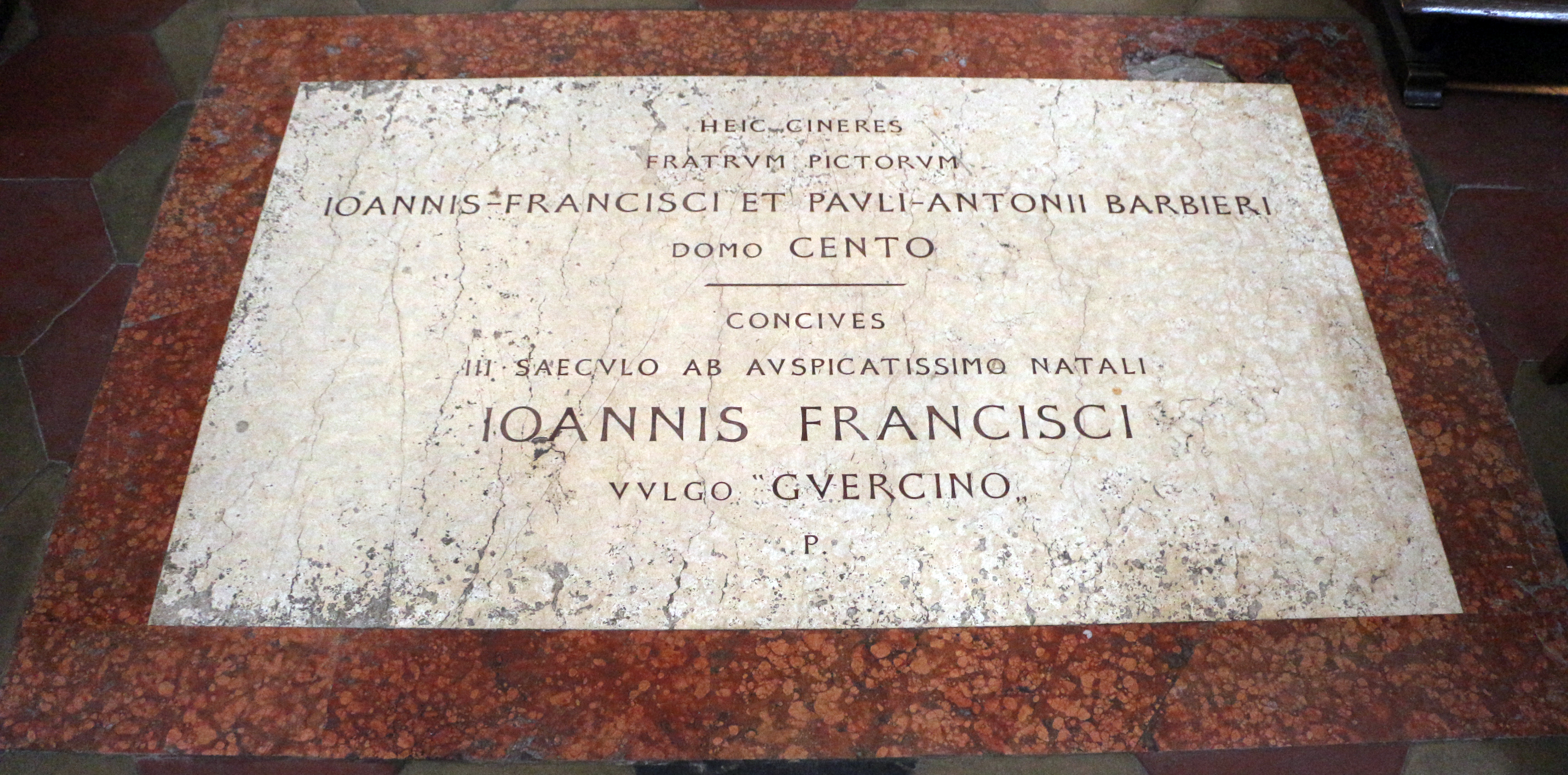
Tomb of Guercino, Santissimo Salvatore, Bologna

== Style ==
Guercino was remarkable for the extreme rapidity of his executions: he completed no fewer than 106 large altarpieces for churches, and his other paintings amount to about 144. He was also a prolific draftsman. His production includes many drawings, usually in ink, washed ink, or red chalk. Most of them were made as preparatory studies for his paintings, but he also drew landscapes, genre subjects, and caricatures for his own enjoyment. Guercino's drawings are known for their fluent style in which "rapid, calligraphic pen strokes combined with dots, dashes, and parallel hatching lines describe the forms".

Despite presumably having monocular vision due to a 'lazy' right eye, Guercino showed remarkable facility to imply depth in his works, perhaps assisted by an enhanced perception of light and shade thanks to compensation by the healthy eye. Other artists with different types of strabismus include Rembrandt, Dürer, Degas, Picasso and (possibly) Leonardo da Vinci.

His lively treatment of the Aurora myth (1621, Villa Aurora, Rome, Italy), painted for the pope's nephew, Cardinal Ludovico Ludovisi. challenges the more measured representation of the same subject painted by Guido Reni at Palazzo Rospigliosi on behalf of a Ludovisi family rival Scipione Borghese and makes a statement of political triumph. Some of his later works are closer to the style of Reni, and are painted with much greater luminosity and clarity than his early works with their prominent use of chiaroscuro.

== Pupils ==
Guercino continued to paint and teach until the end of his life, amassing a notable fortune. He died on 22 December 1666 in Bologna. As he never married, his estate passed to his nephews and pupils, Benedetto Gennari II and Cesare Gennari. Other pupils include Giulio Coralli, Giuseppe Bonati of Ferrara, Cristoforo Serra of Cesena, Father Cesare Pronti of Ferrara, Sebastiano Ghezzi, Sebastiano Bombelli, Lorenzo Bergonzoni of Bologna, Francesco Paglia of Brescia, Benedetto Zallone of Cento, Bartolomeo Caravoglia, Giuseppe Maria Galeppini of Forli, and Matteo Loves.

== Works ==
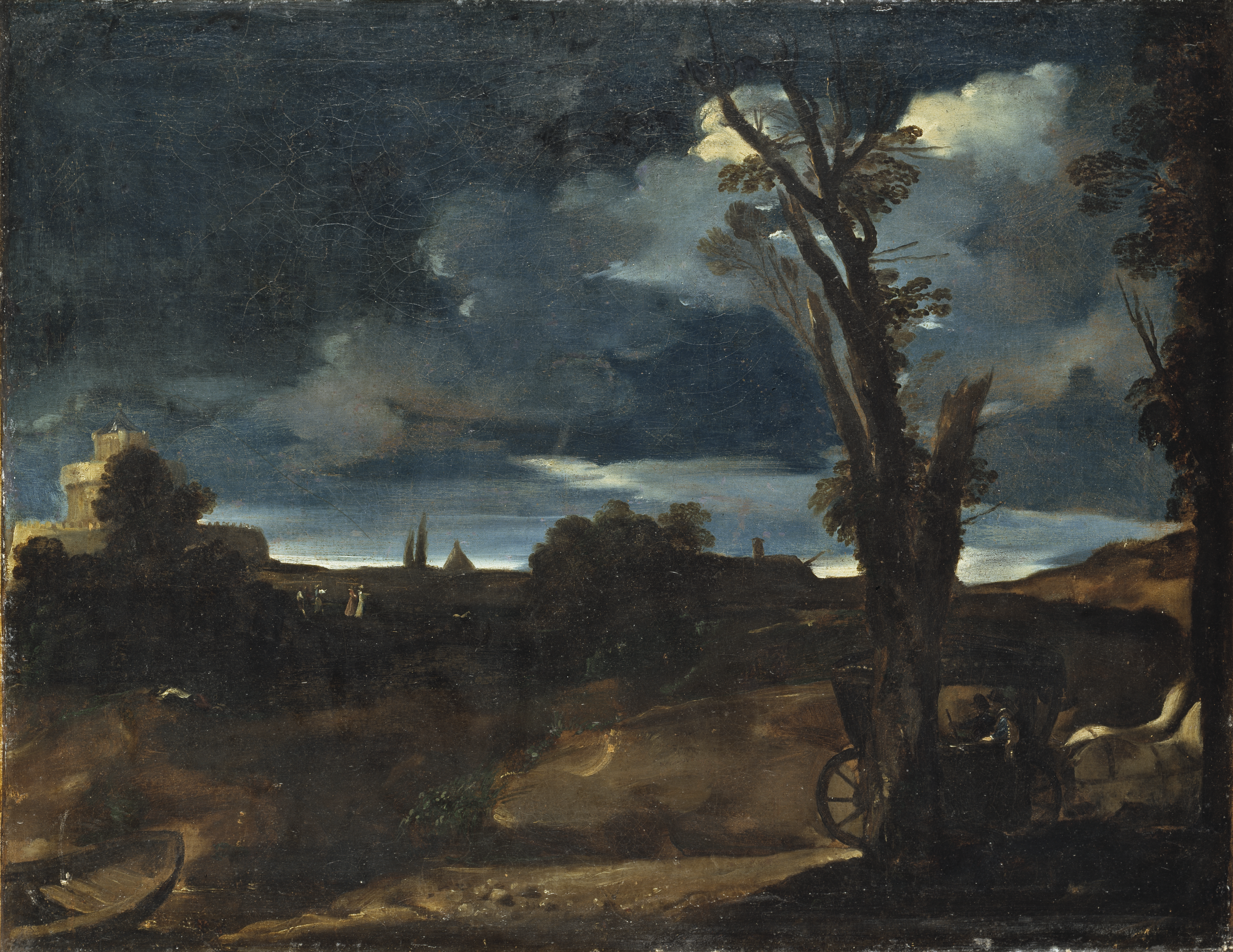
Moonlit Landscape (c. 1616, oil on canvas, 55 × 71 cm, Nationalmuseum, Stockholm, Sweden). An early, naturalistic landscape.

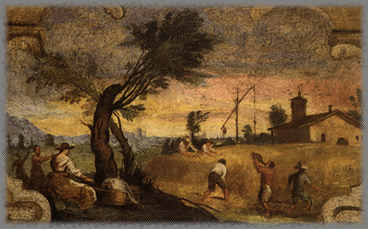
Harvesting (1615–1617, fresco, transferred to canvas, 18 × 23.5 cm, Pinacoteca, Cento, Italy). One of the frescoes created (with the assistance of Lorenzo Gennari) for Casa Pannini in Cento.

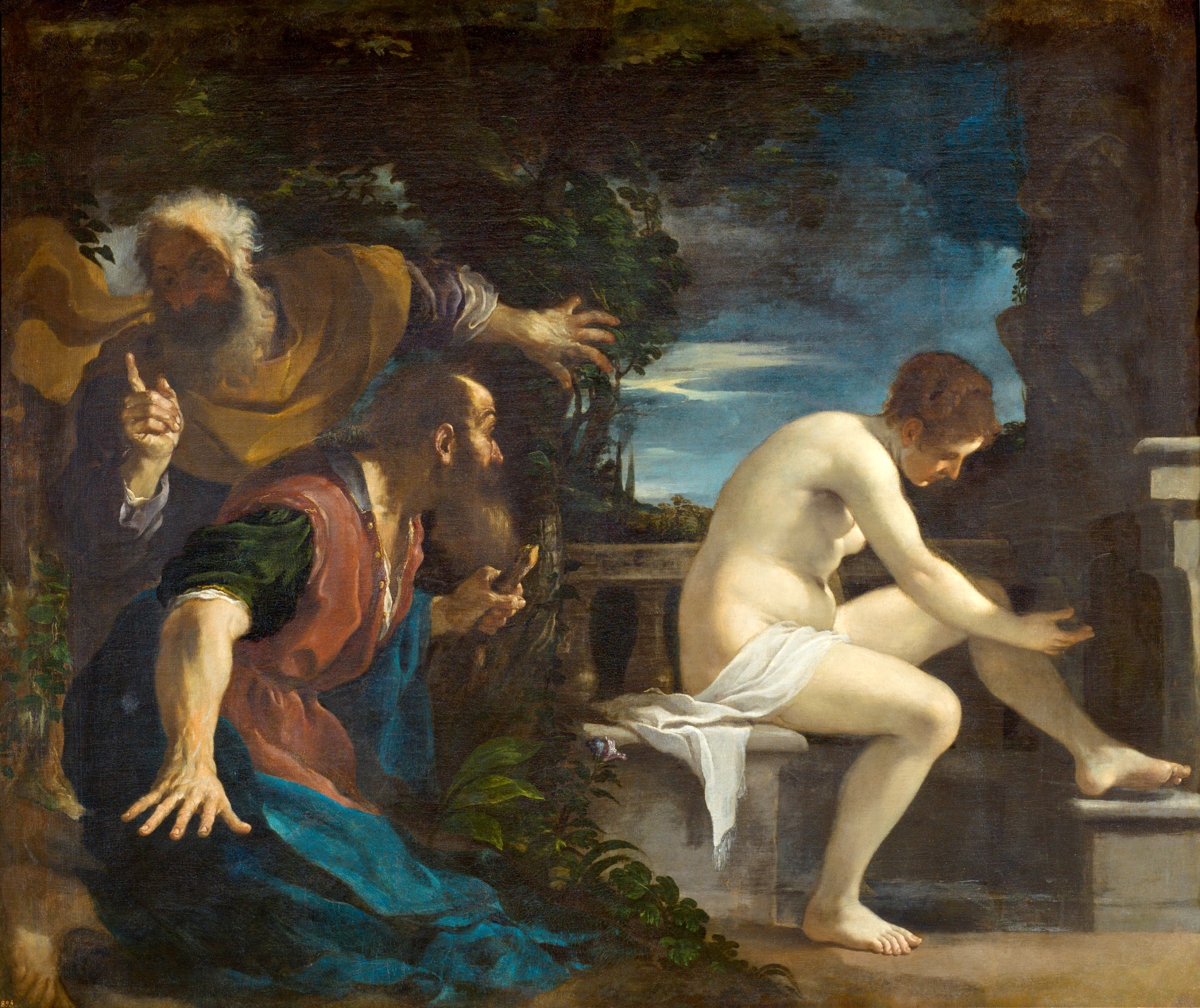
Susanna and the Elders (1617, oil on canvas, 176 × 208 cm, Museo del Prado, Madrid, Spain) was painted in Bologna for Cardinal Alessandro Ludovisi, the future Pope Gregory XV. The dramatic dynamism of this early work contrasts with the studied classicism of the artist's later depiction of the same story in 1649–1650.

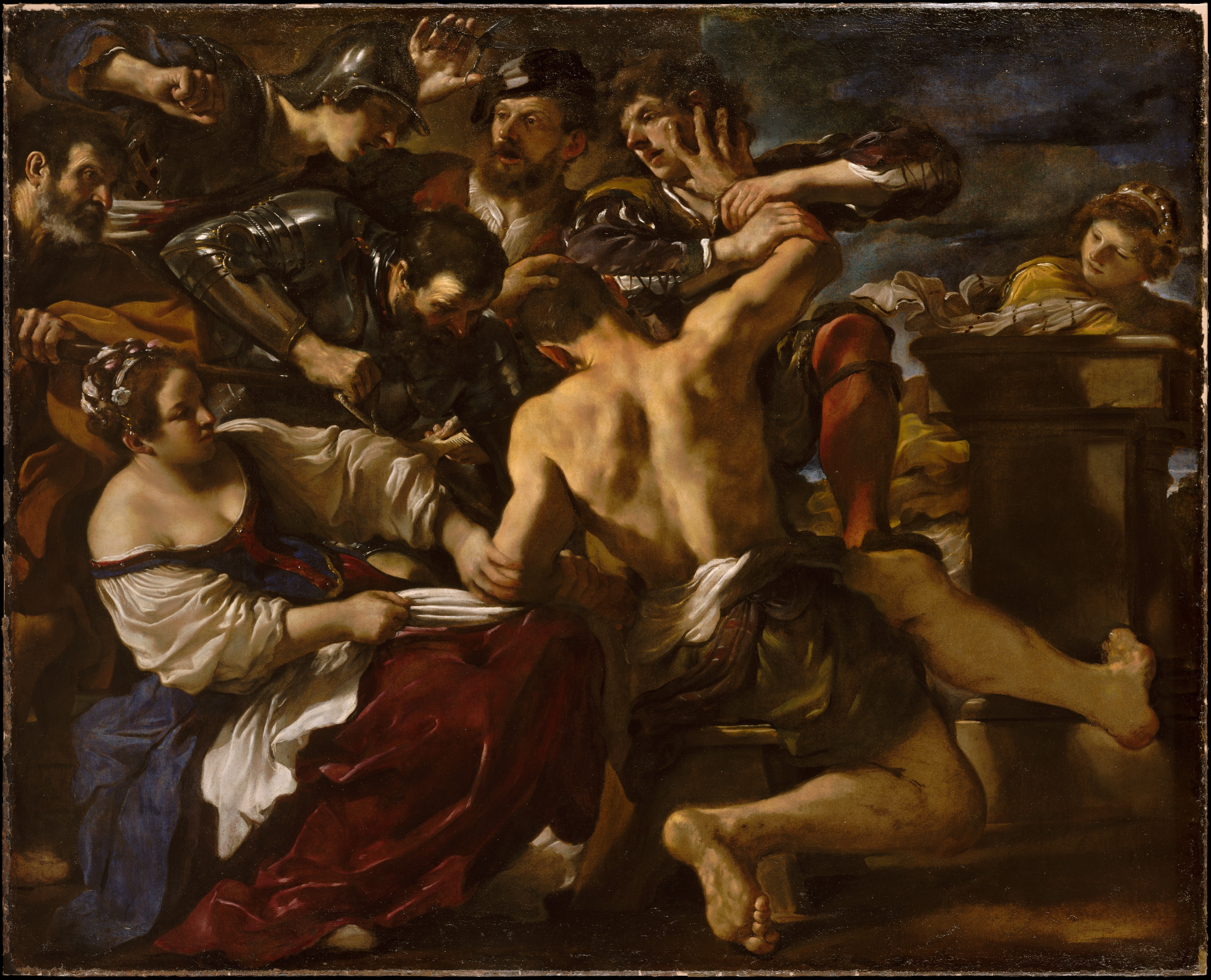
Samson Seized by the Philistines, 1619. This work depicts the biblical scene where Samson is betrayed by his lover, Delilah. Samson is at the centre, though his face cannot be seen, and surrounding him are the Philistines who have come to blind him after cutting off his hair, his source of strength.
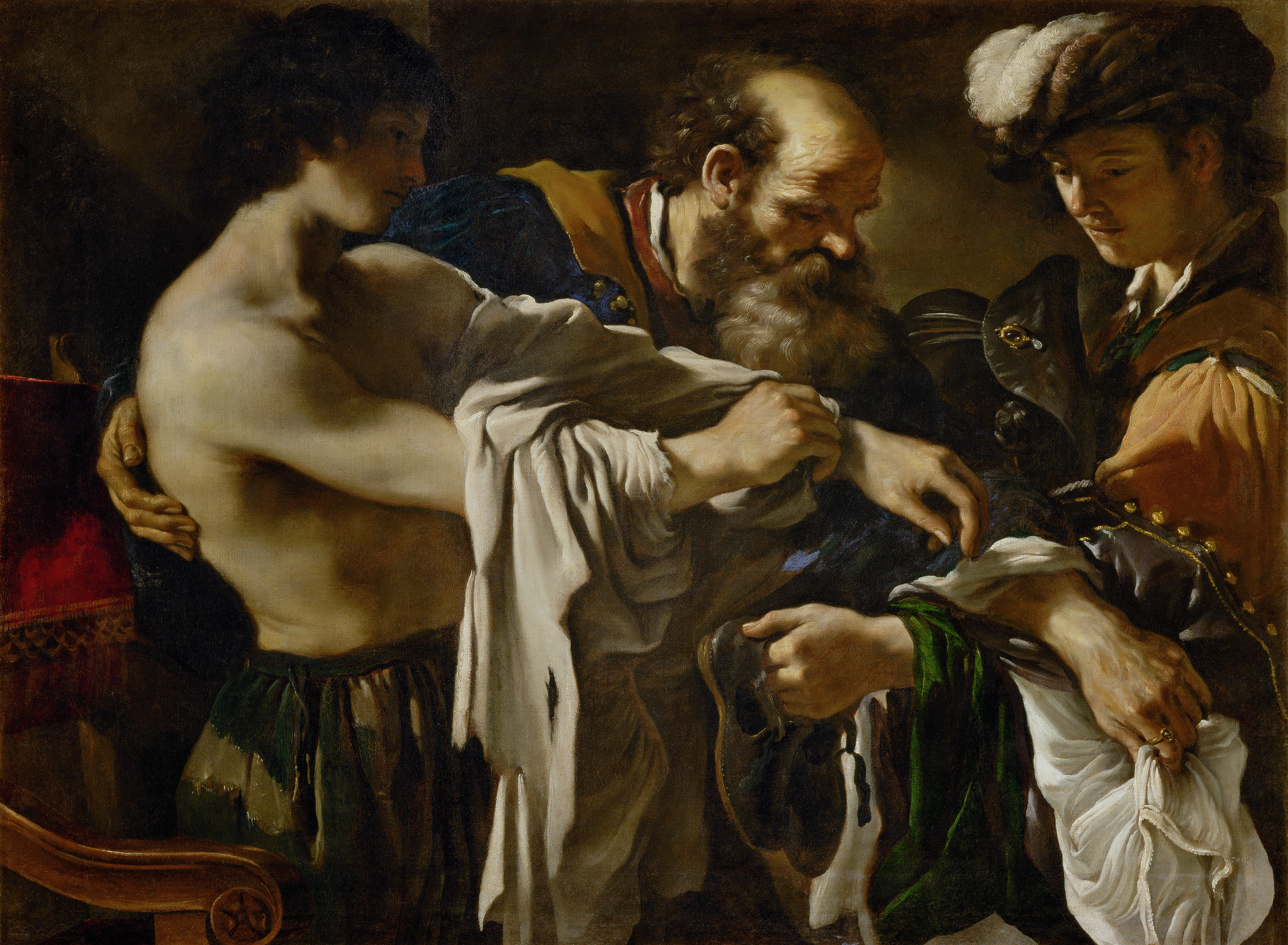
Return of the Prodigal Son, 1619

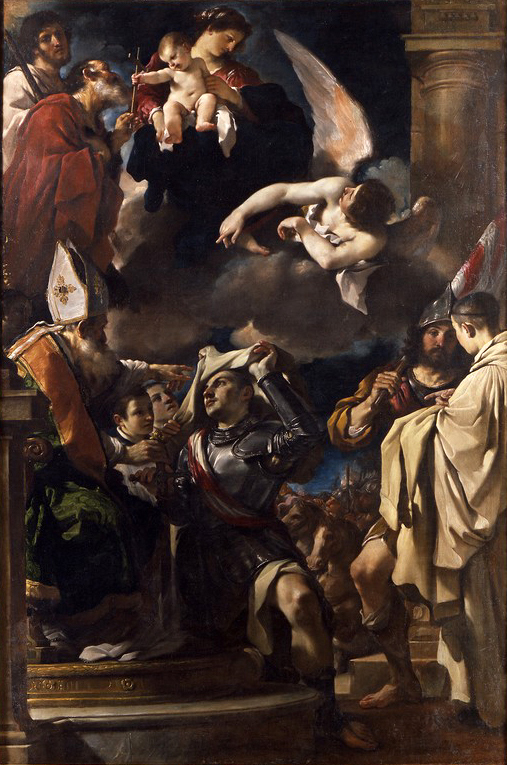
St William Receiving the Monastic Habit, 1620

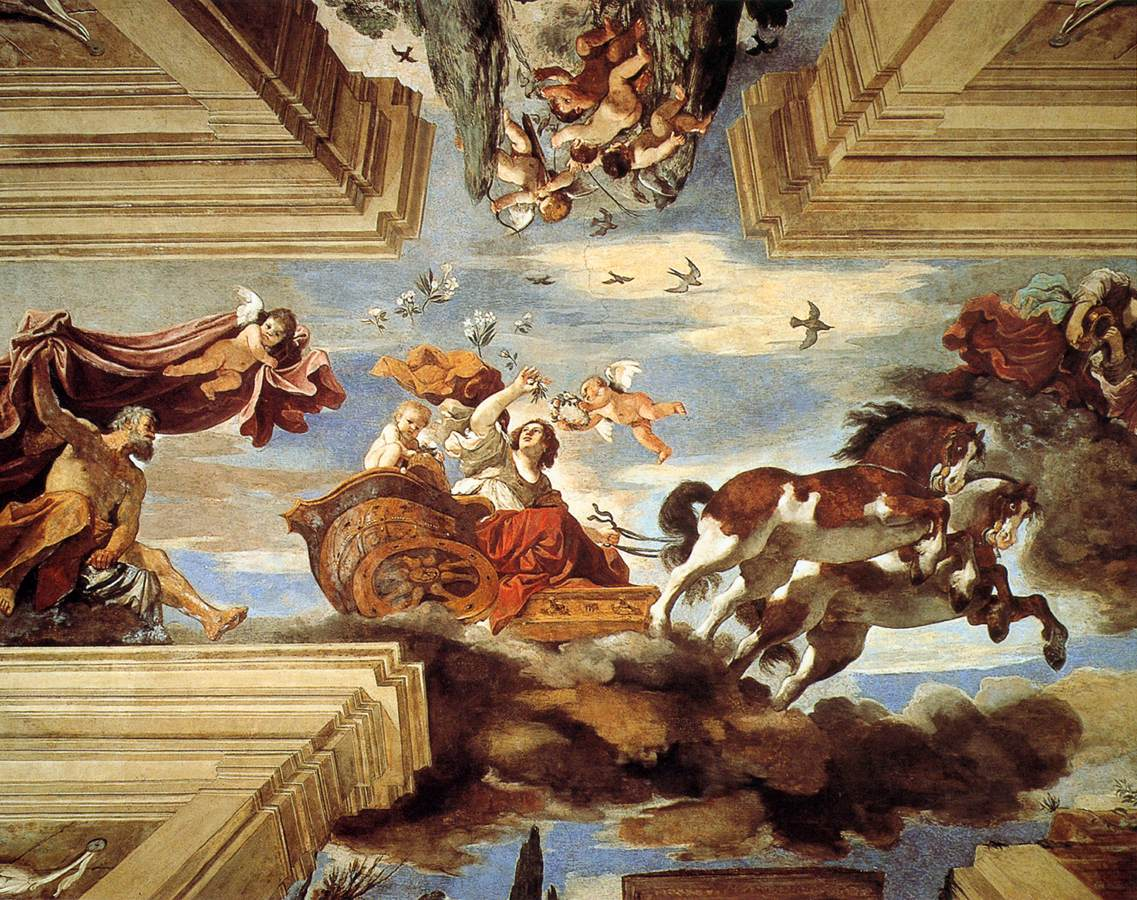
Aurora, 1621 (ceiling fresco, tempera), Villa Aurora, Rome, Italy

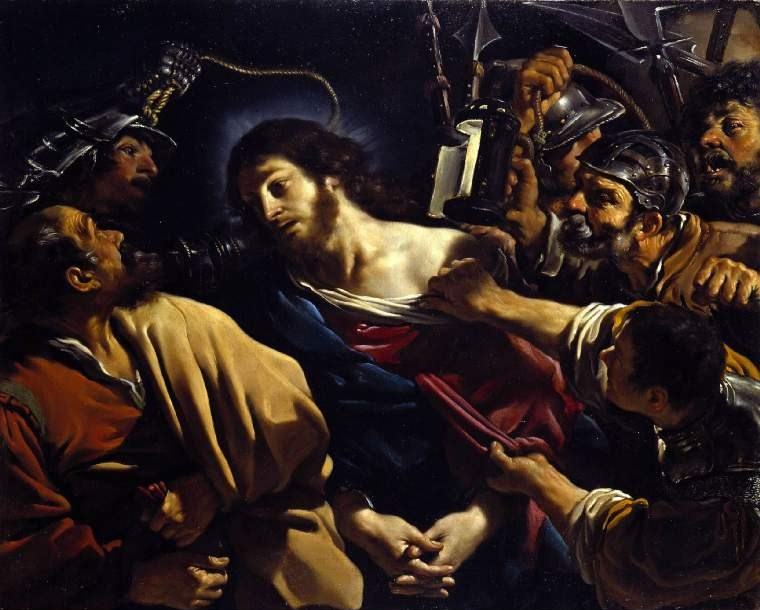
Capturing Christ, 1621

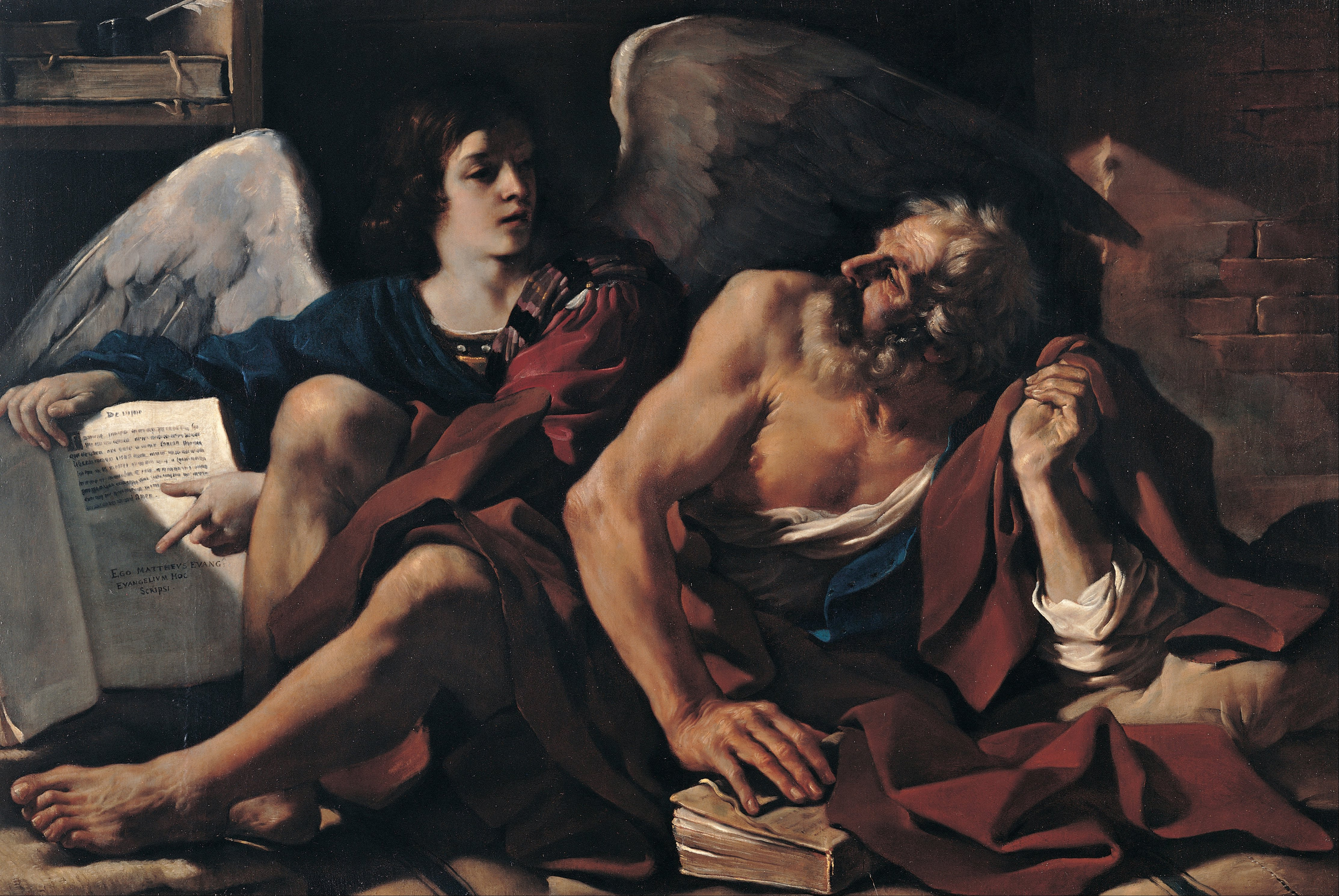
Saint Matthew and the Angel, 1622

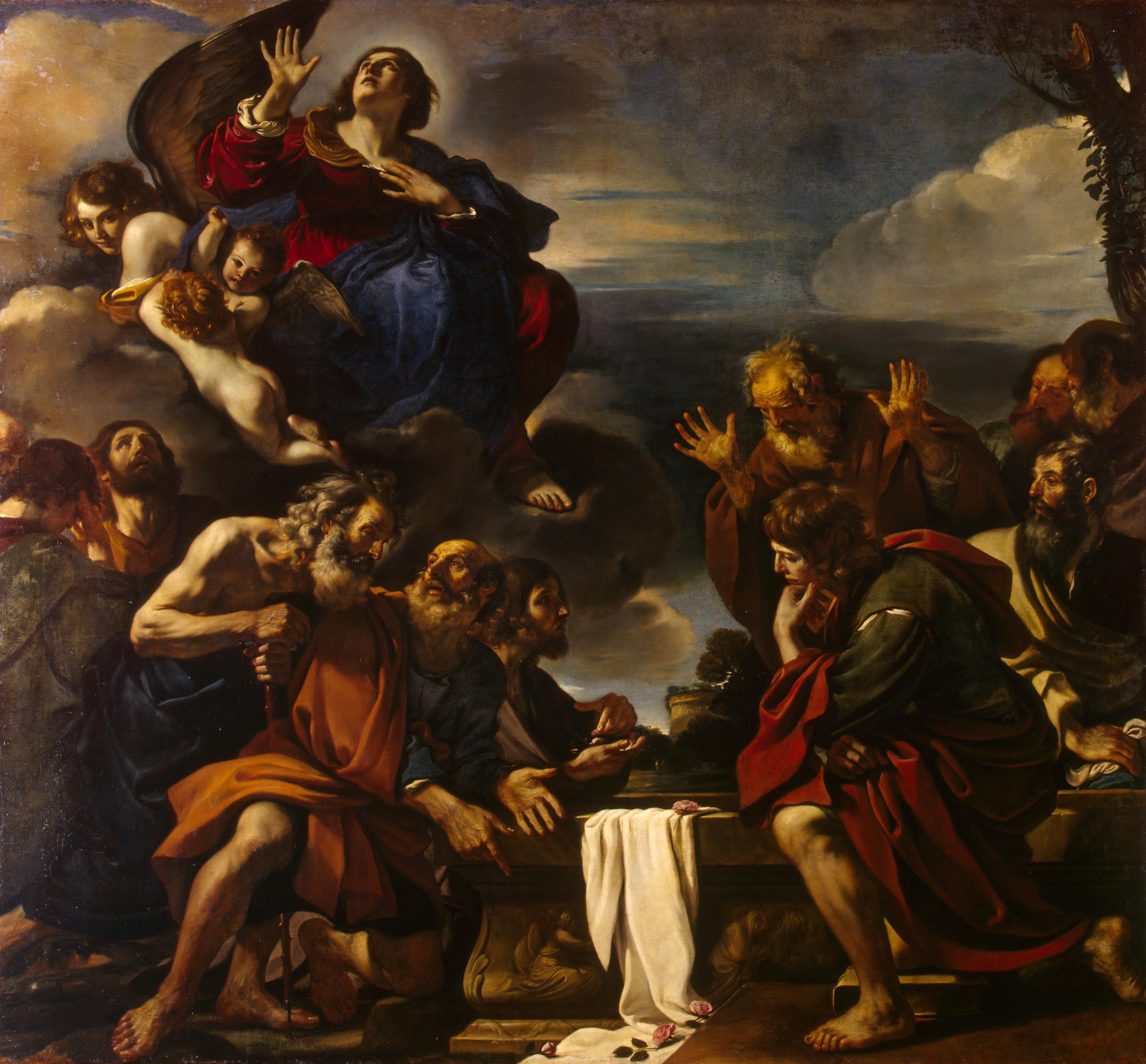
Assumption, c. 1623, Hermitage Museum

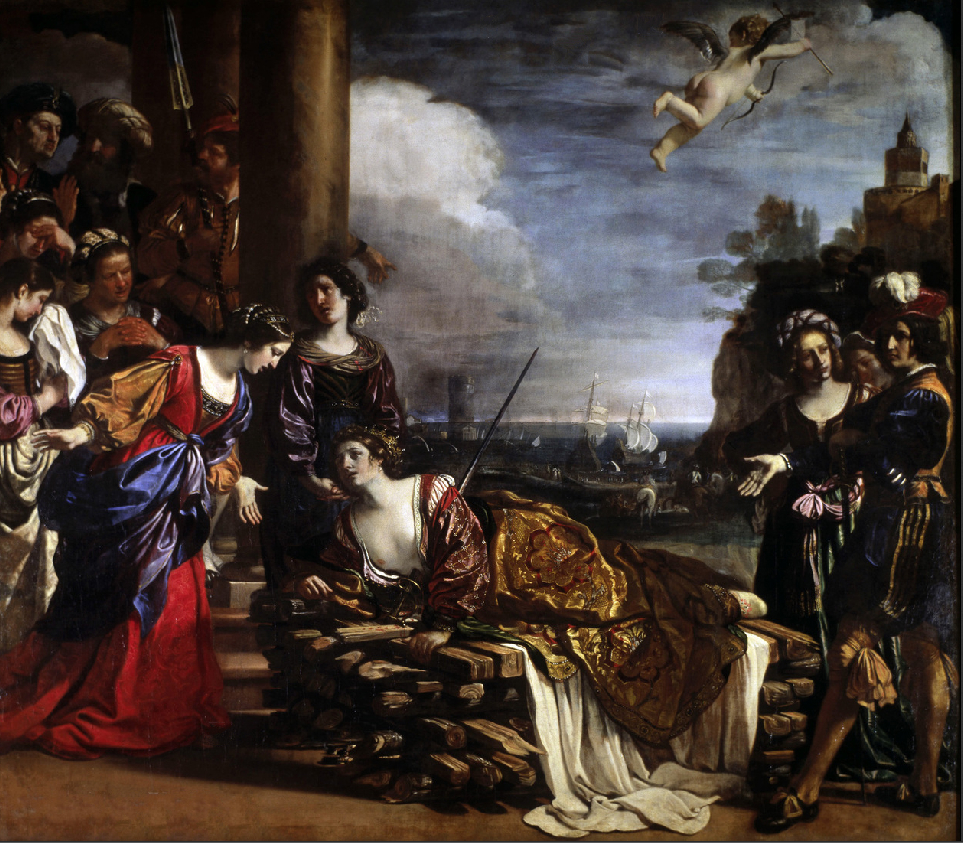
La morte di Didone, 1631

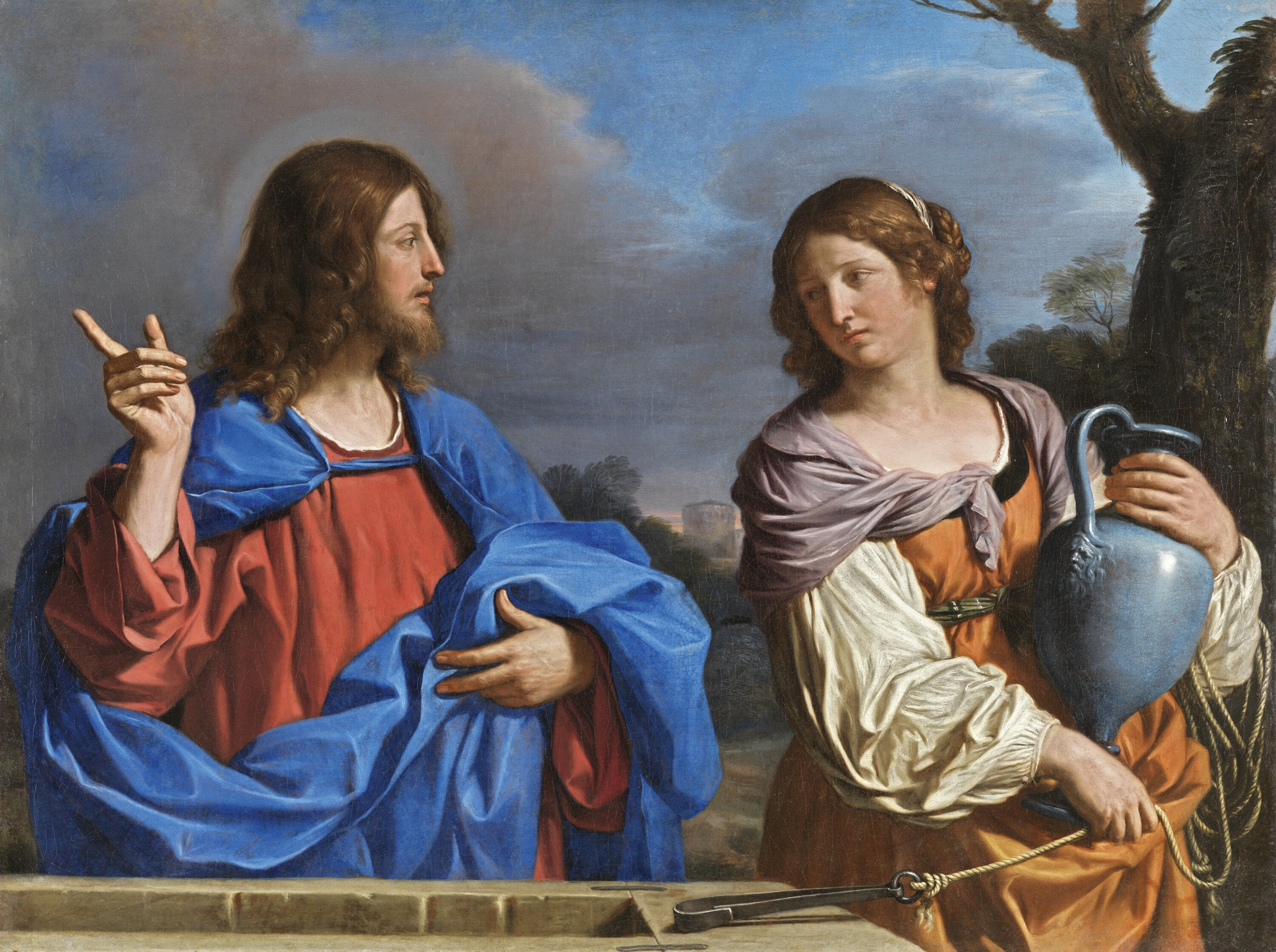
Christ and the Woman of Samaria II, c. 1640–1641

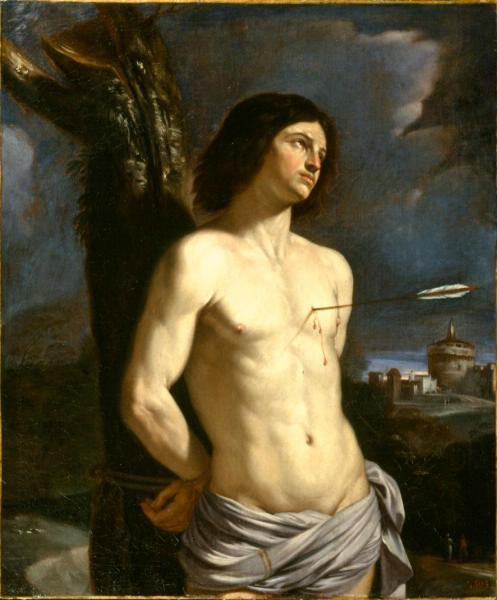
St. Sebastian, 1642, Pushkin Museum

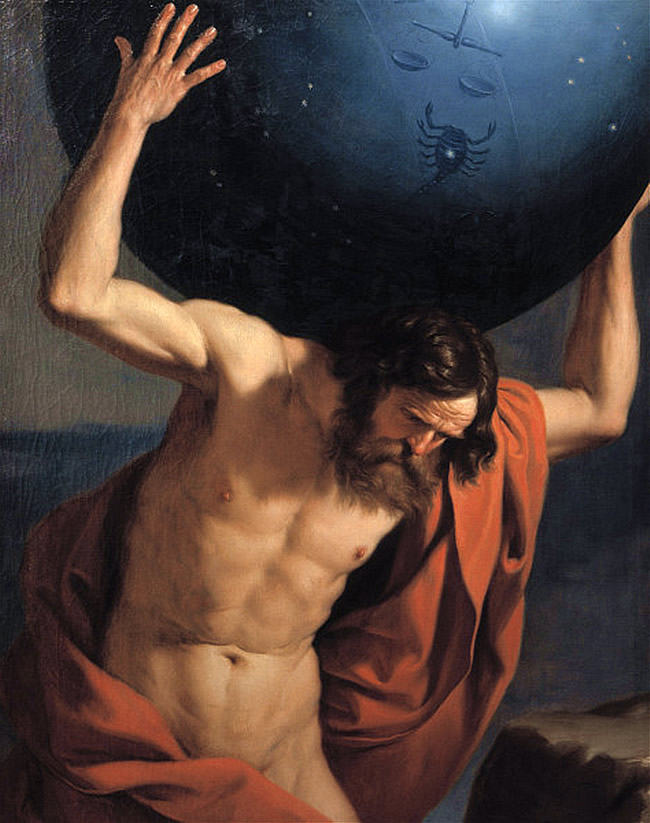
Atlas holding up the celestial globe, 1646

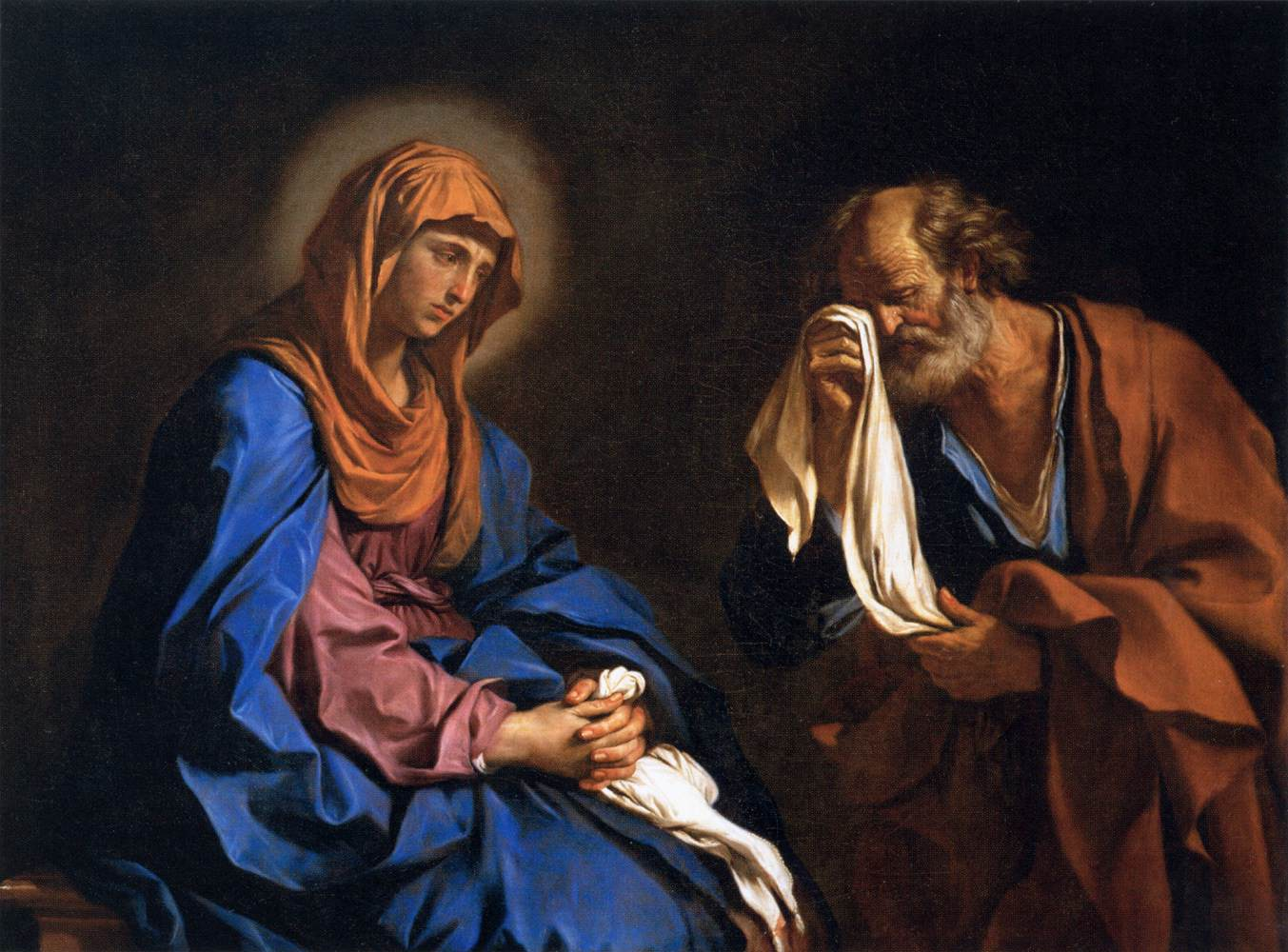
St Peter Weeping before the Virgin, 1647

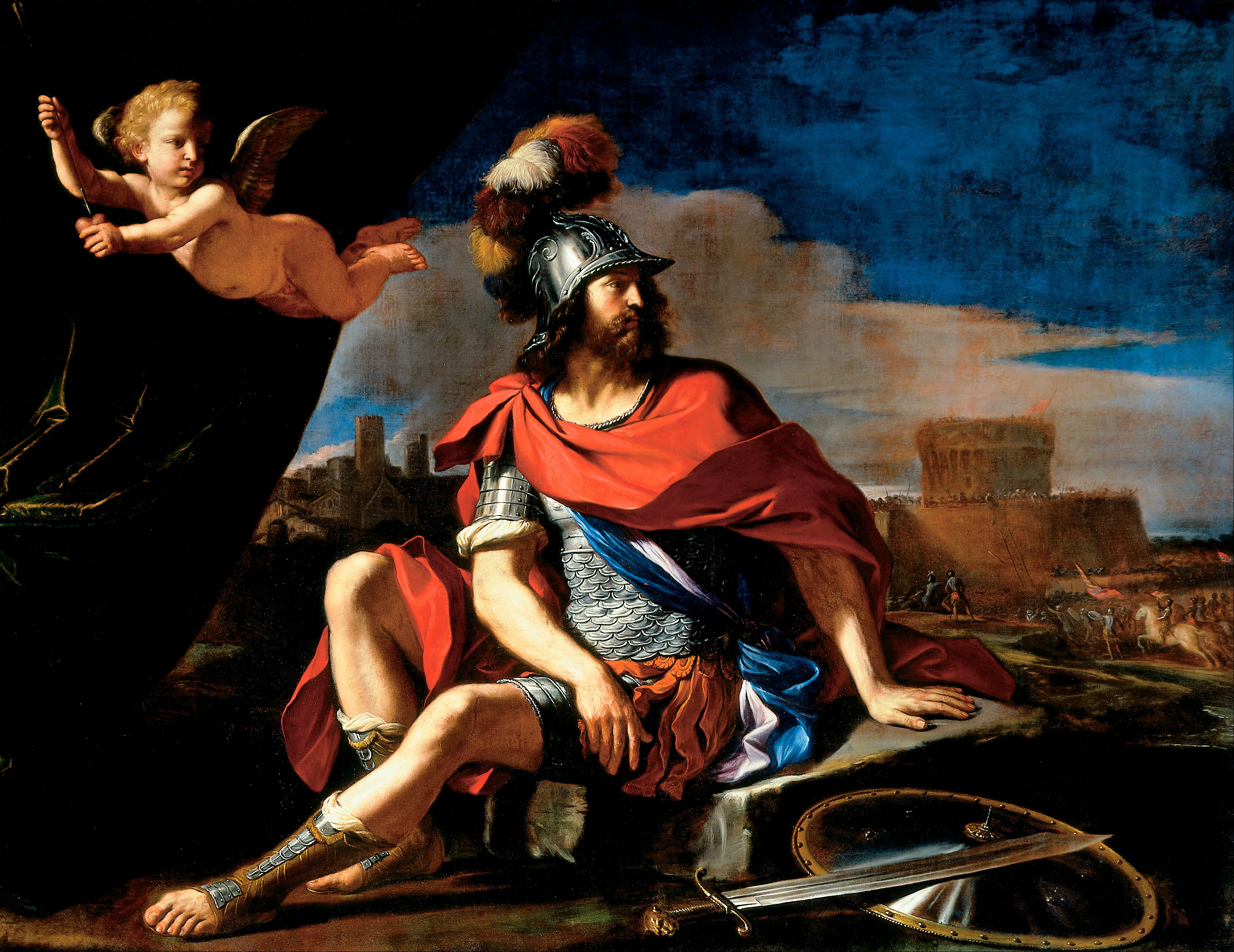
Mars with Cupid, 1649

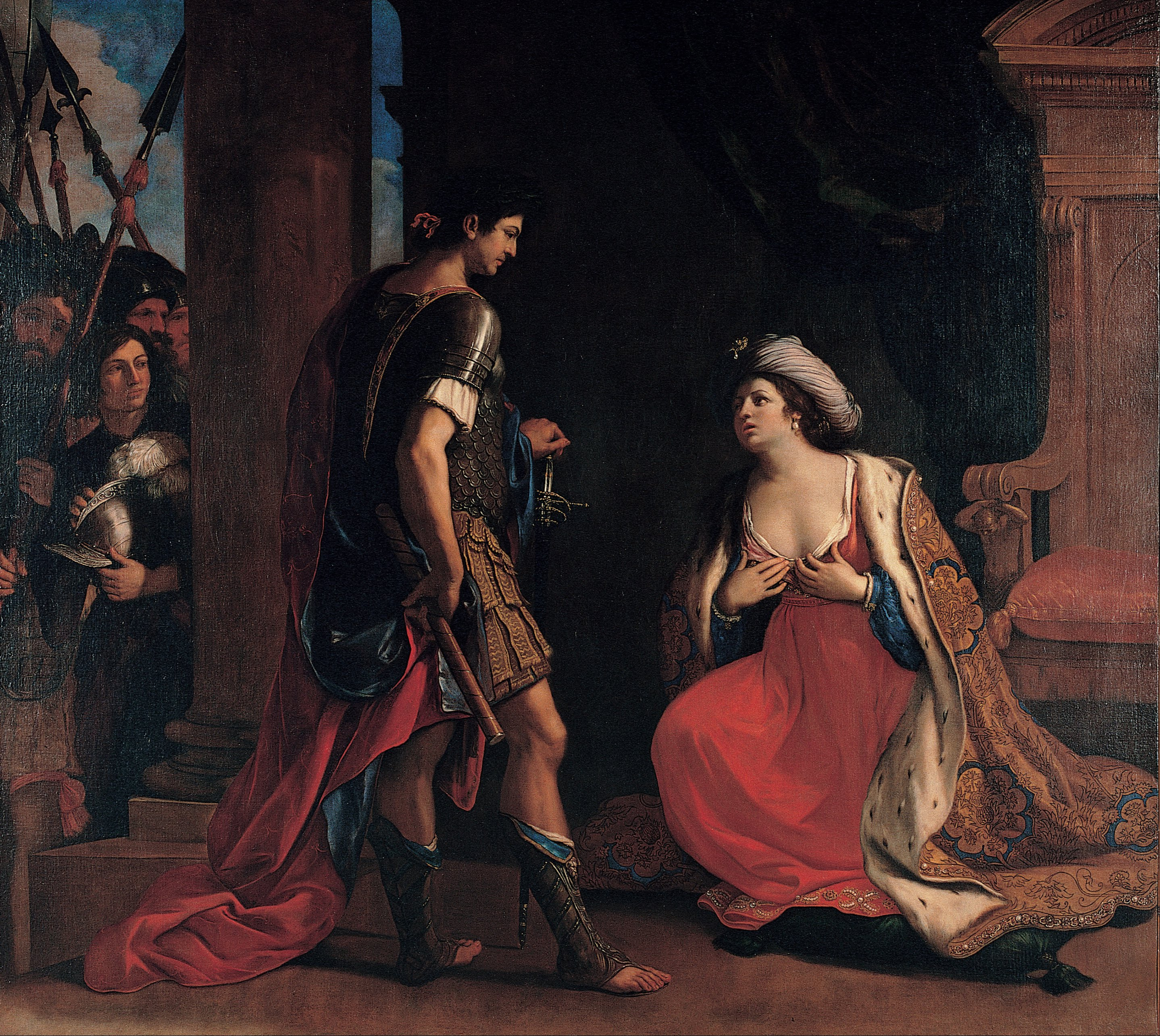
Cleopatra and Octavian, 1649

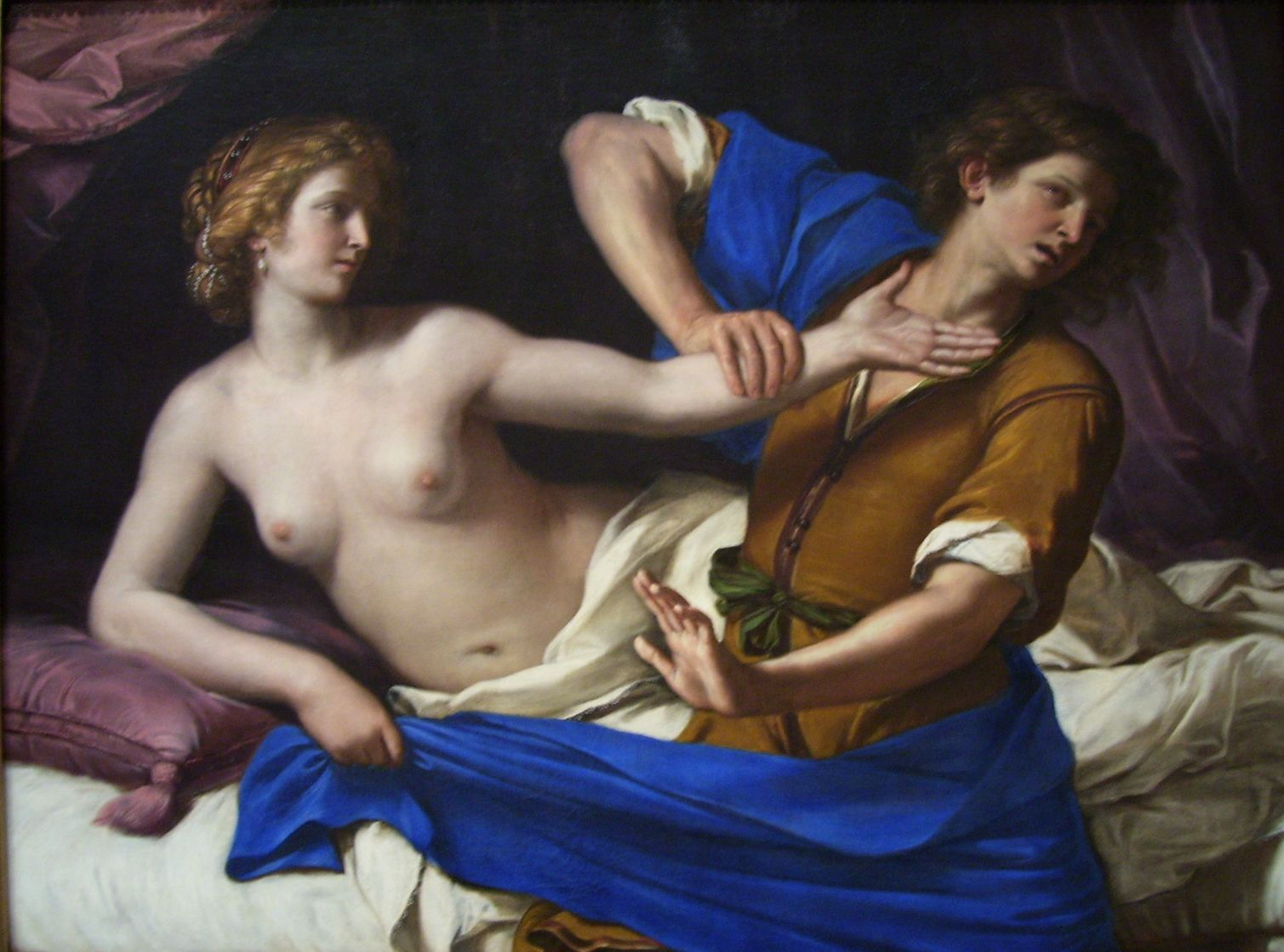
Joseph and Potiphar's Wife, 1649, National Gallery of Art

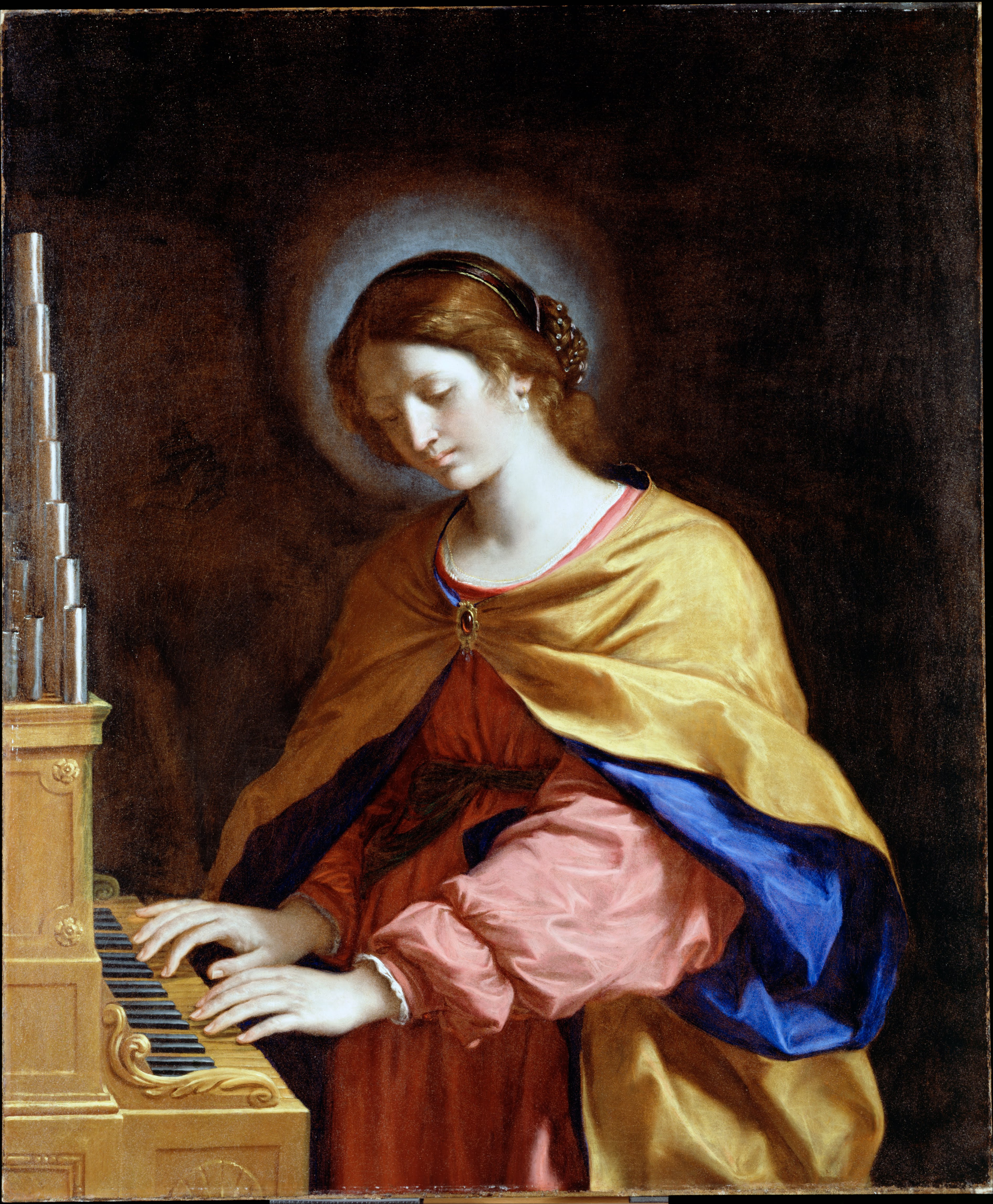
St. Cecilia, 1649

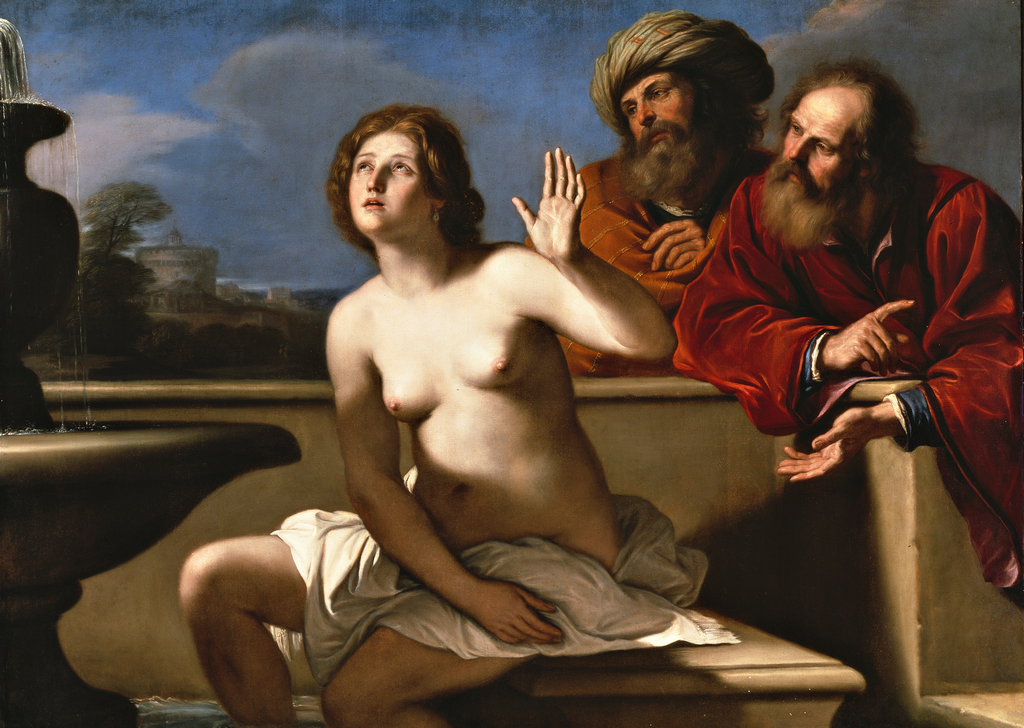
Susanna and the Elders, 1650

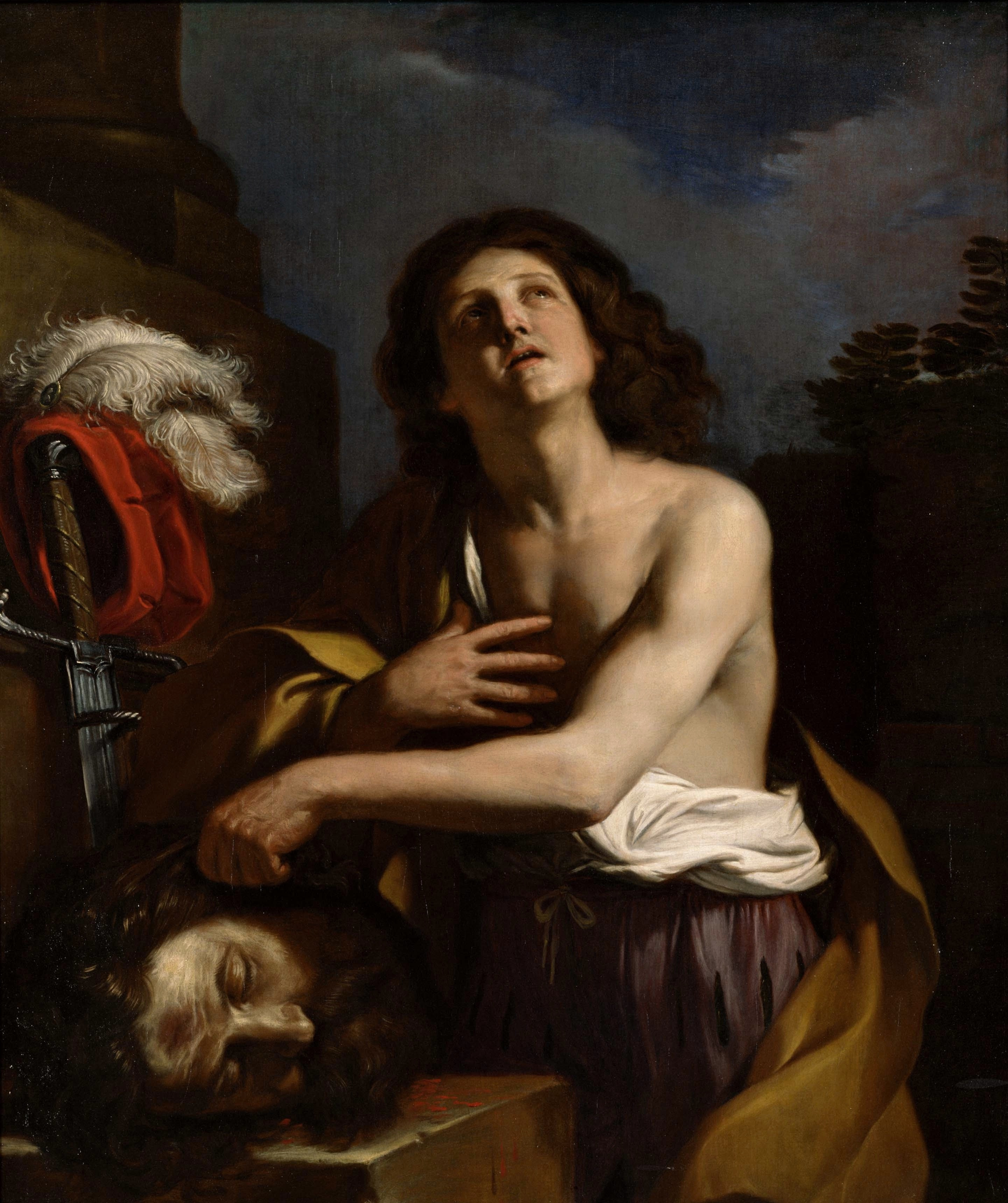
David with the Head of Goliath, circa 1650

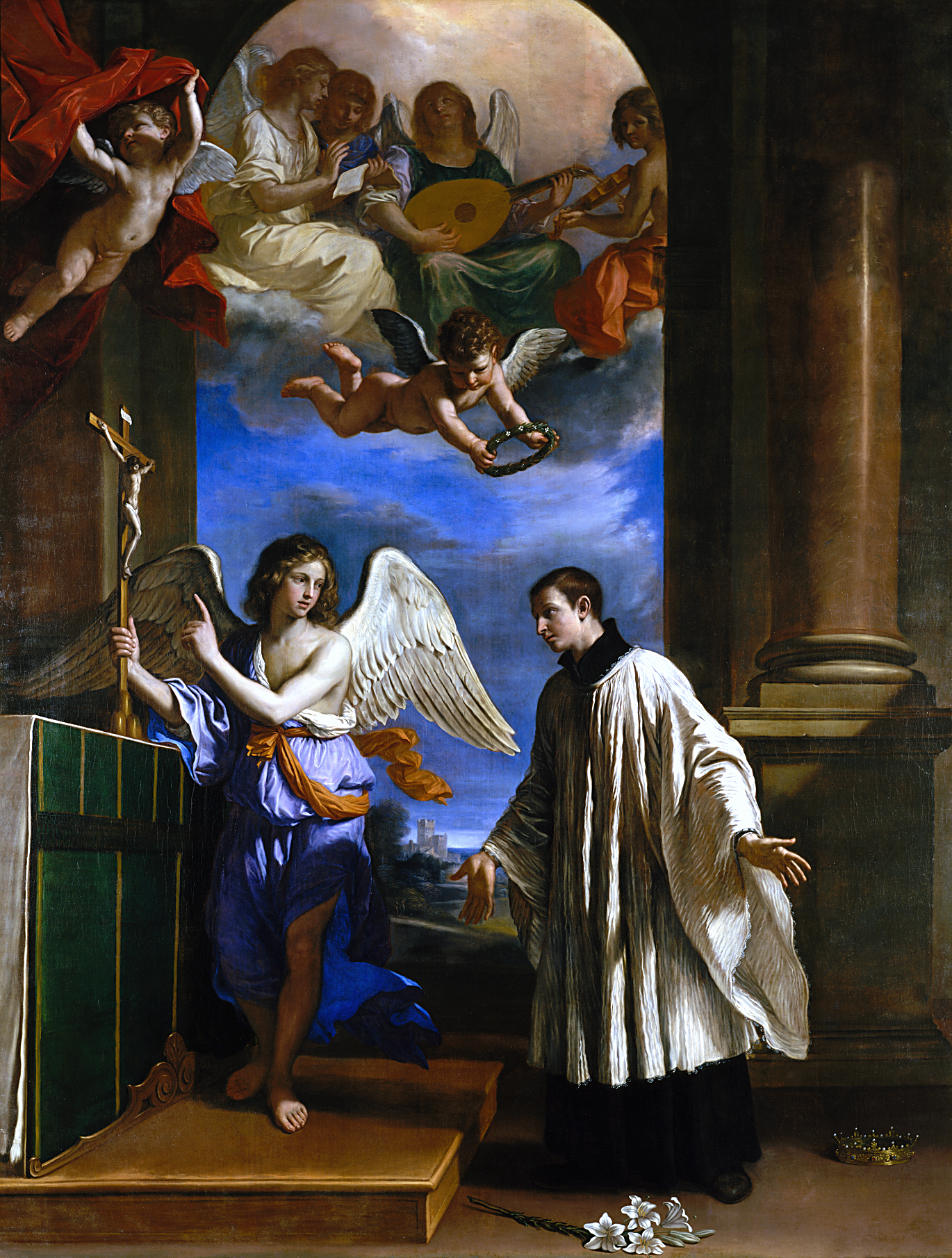
The Vocation of Saint Aloysius Gonzaga, 1650

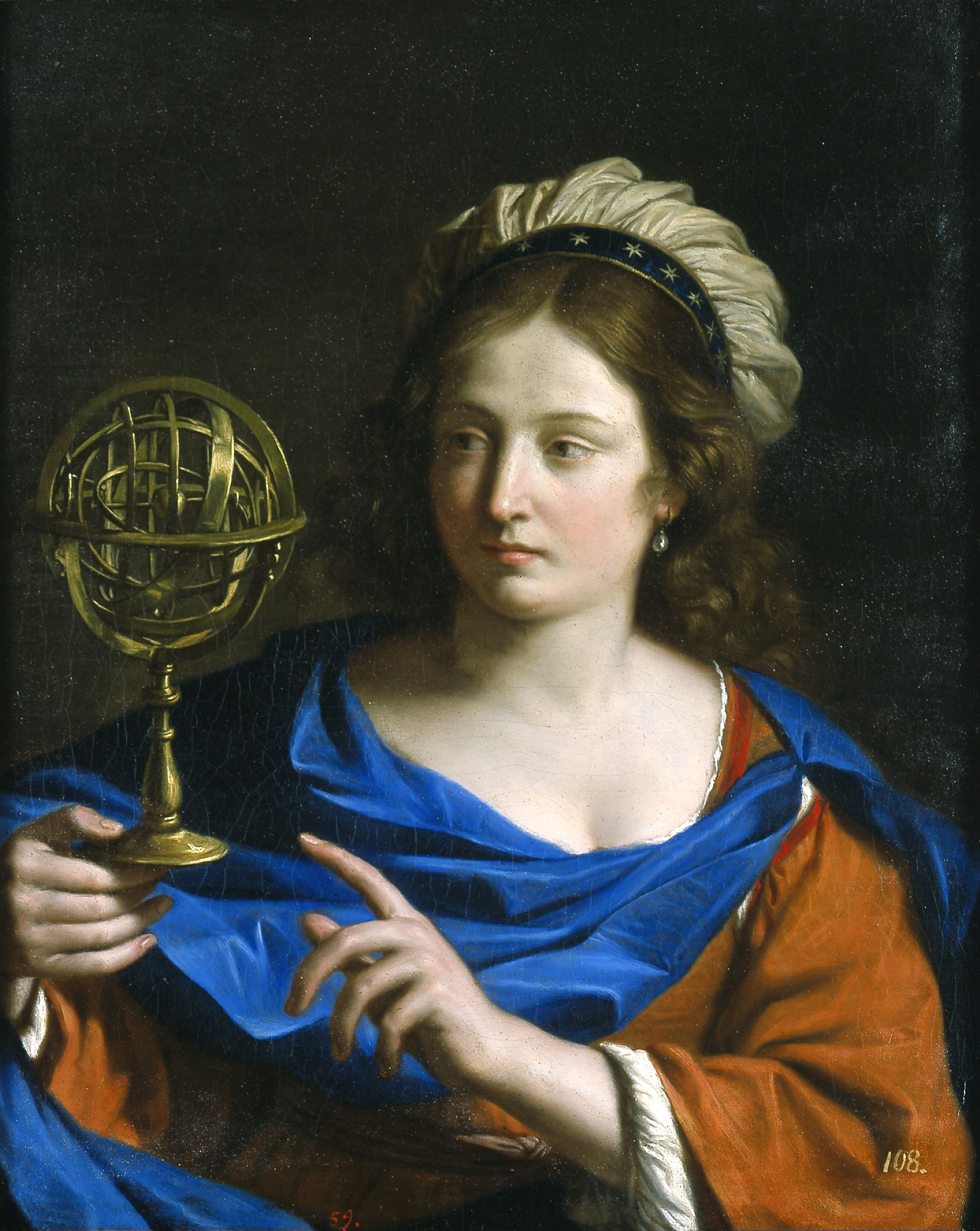
Personification of Astrology, ca. 1650–1655, Blanton Museum of Art, Texas

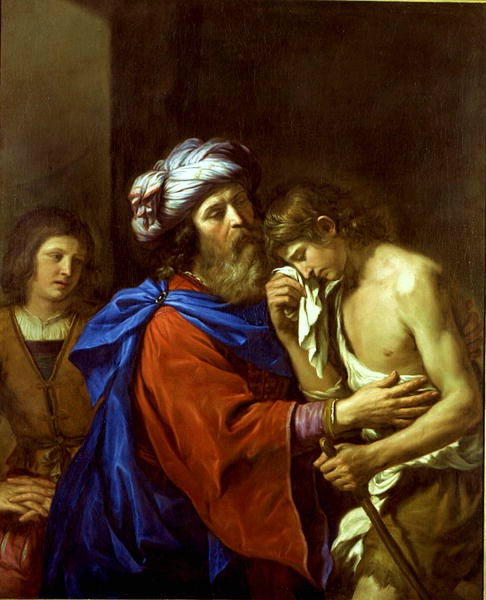
The Return of the Prodigal Son, 1651

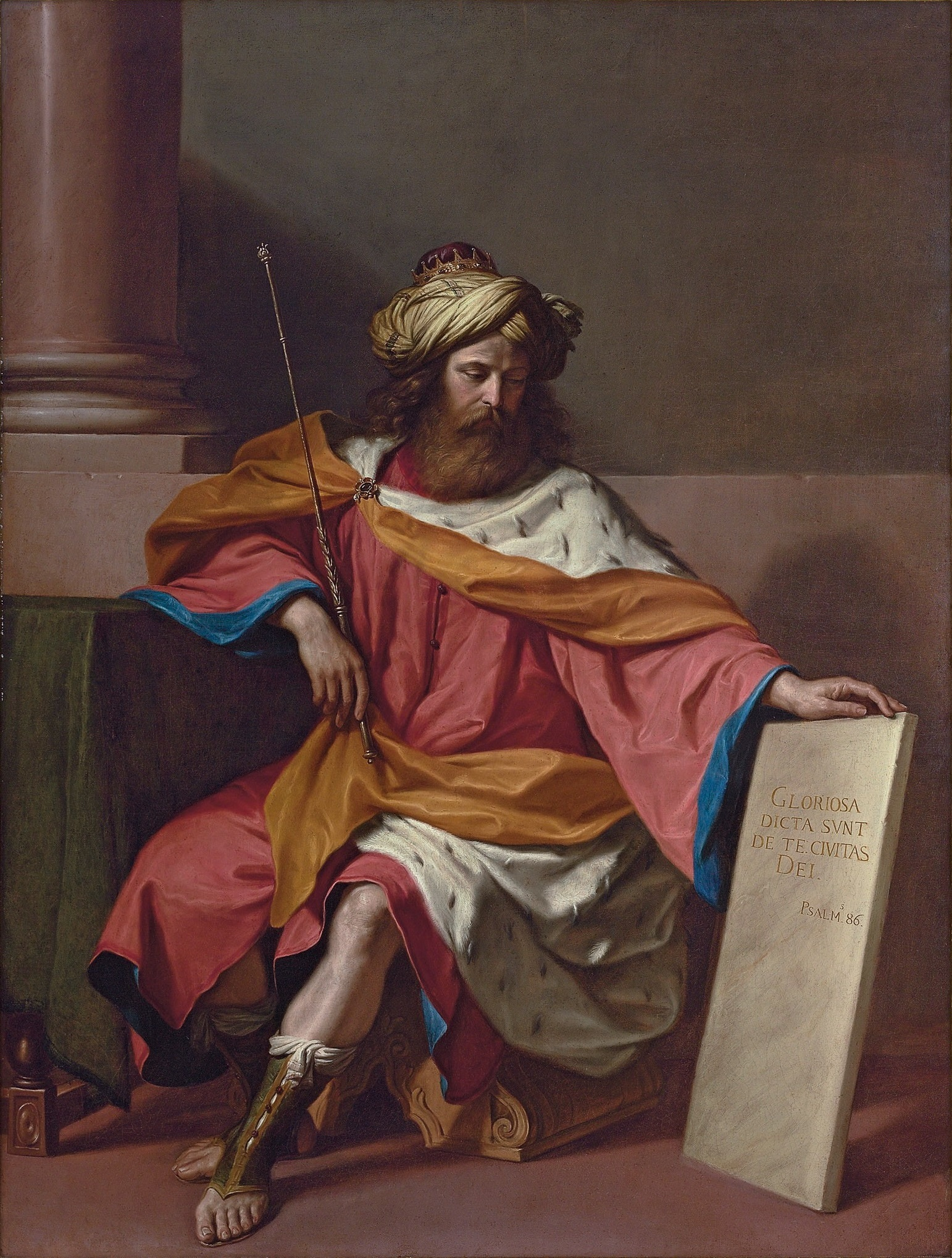
King David, 1651

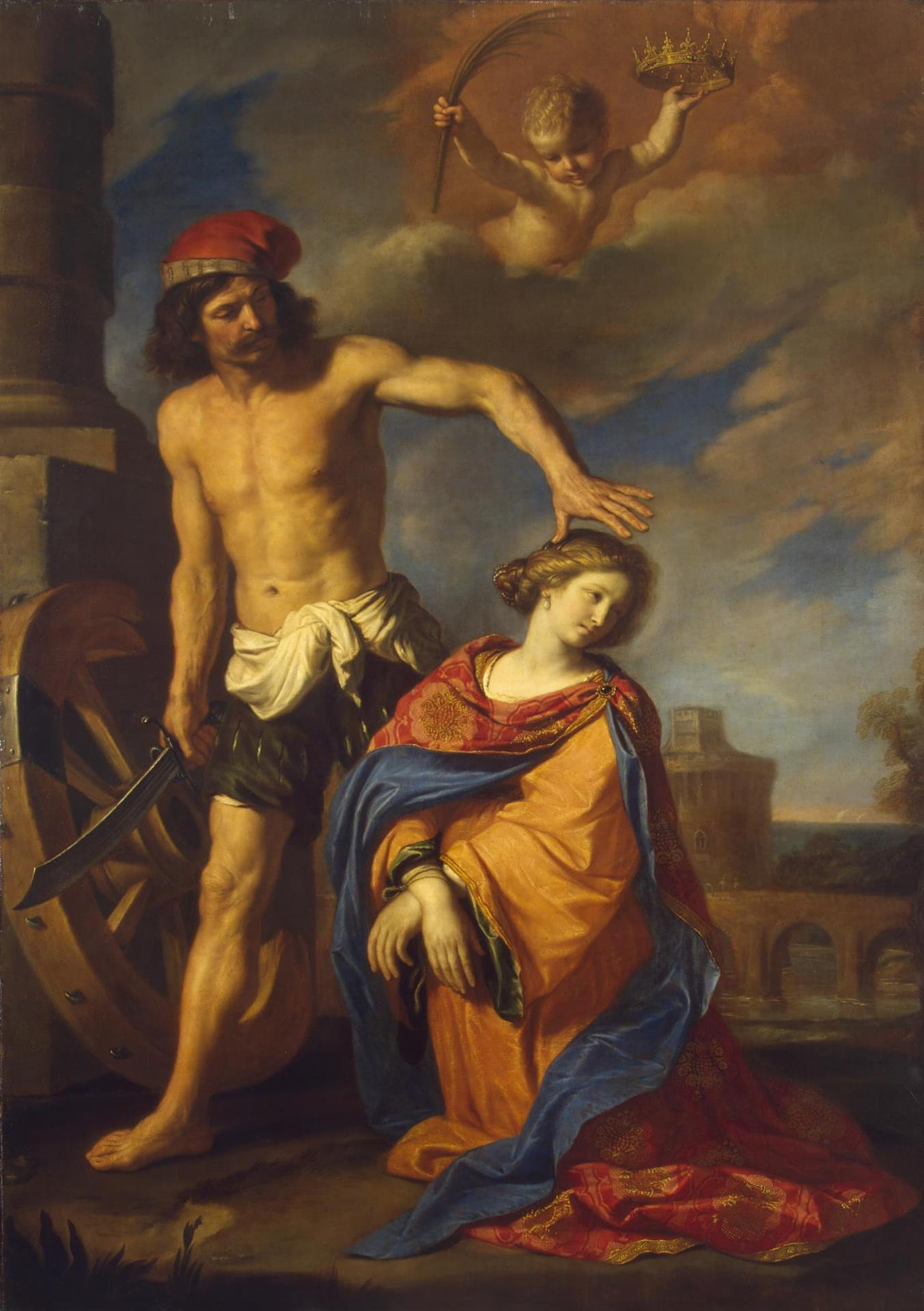
The Martyrdom of Saint Catherine, 1653, Hermitage Museum

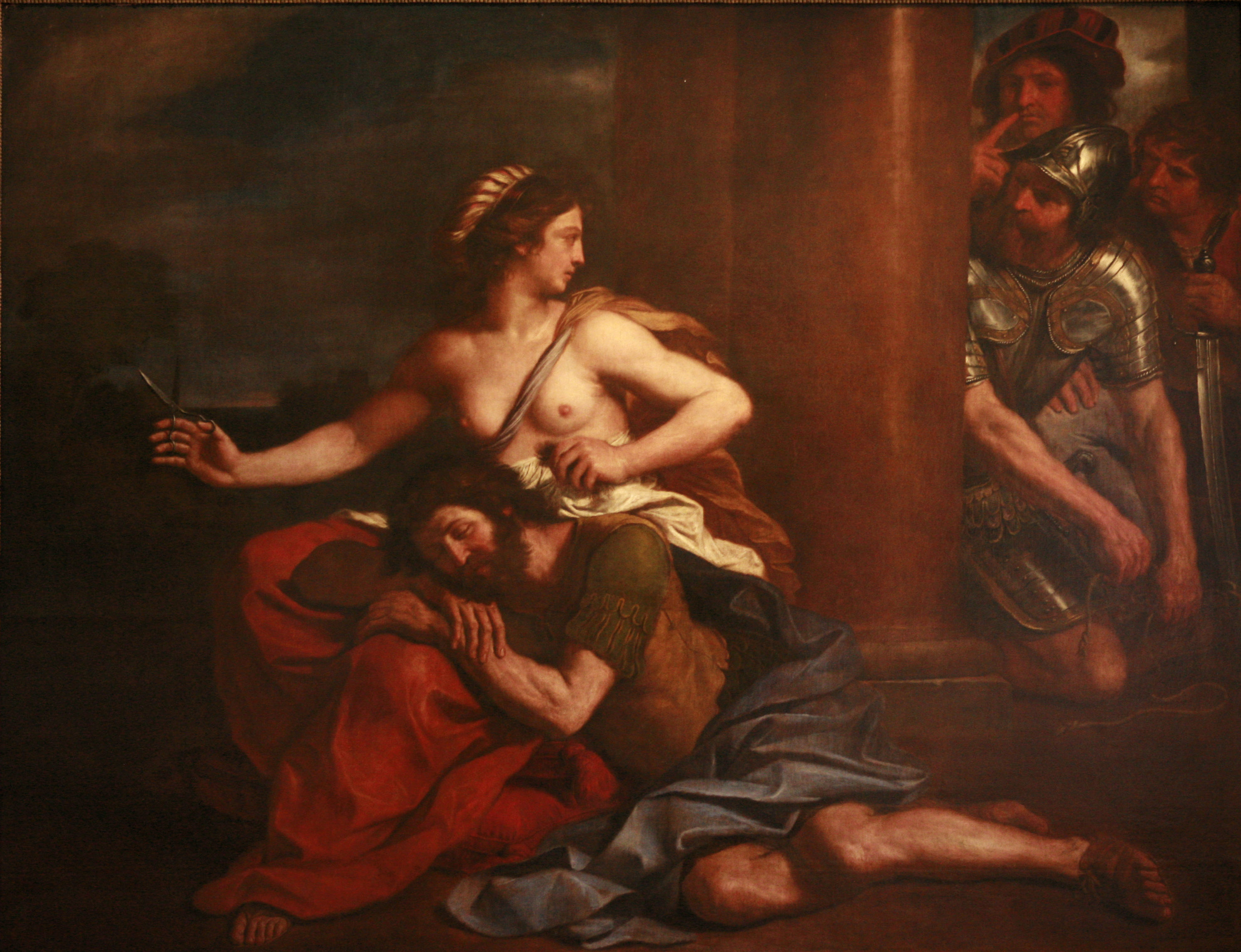
Samson and Delilah, 1654

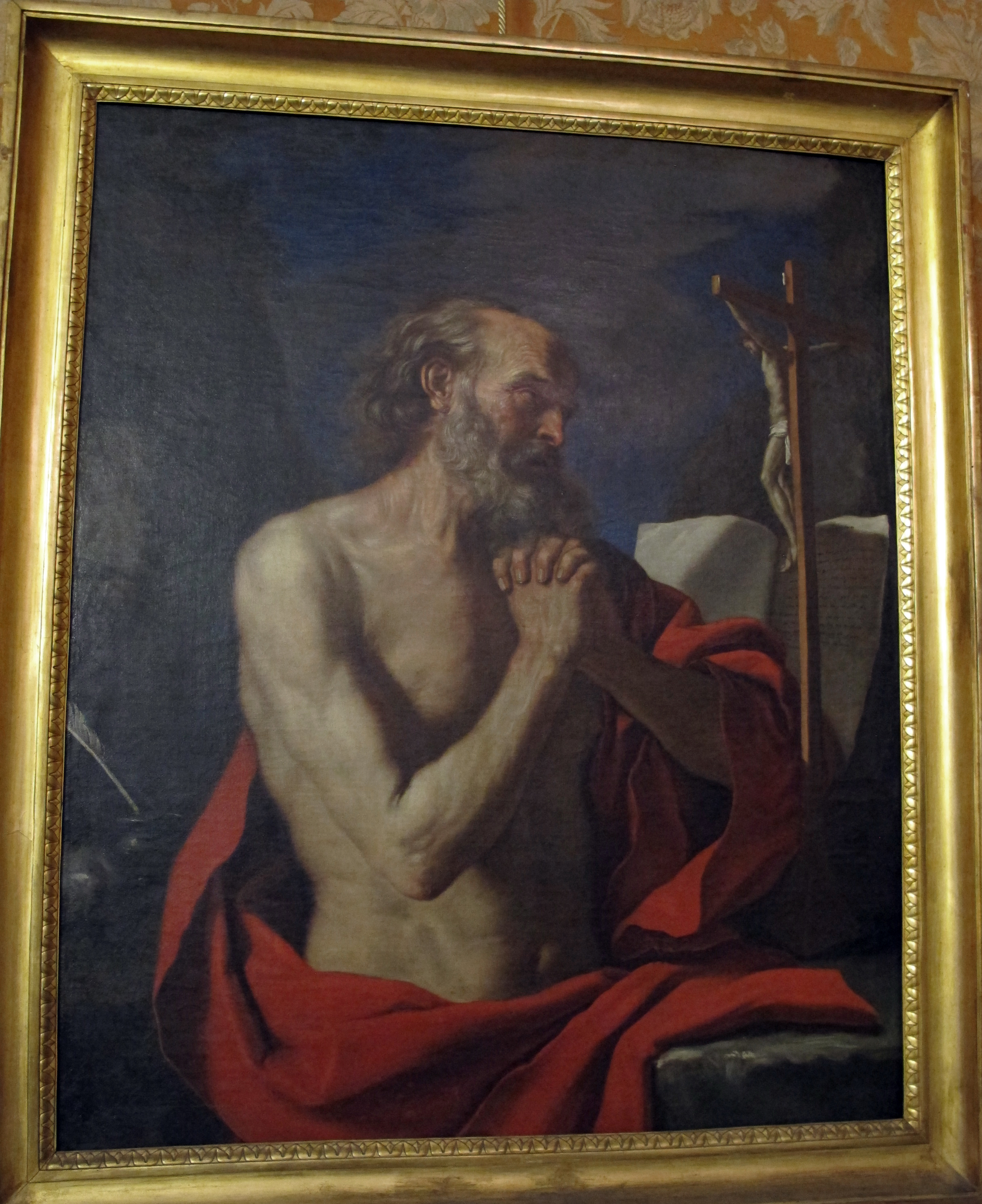
Saint Jerome, c.1640–1650

== Exhibitions ==
A groundbreaking exhibition held at the Archiginnasio of Bologna in 1968 provided the most complete panorama of Guercino's work to date, including paintings from the later parts of his career after the death of Pope Gregory XV, which had previously attracted relatively little attention. For the fourth centenary of the artist's birth in 1991, an expanded exhibition was organized by the Pinacoteca Nazionale di Bologna in conjunction with the Schirn Kunsthalle Frankfurt and the National Gallery of Art, Washington. Both these exhibitions were curated by Guercino's biggest modern champion, Denis Mahon, who was responsible for their catalogues. In 2011–2012, a large exhibition was displayed at Palazzo Barberini in Rome, dedicated to the memory of Mahon, who had recently died. An exhibition displayed at the National Museum, Warsaw in 2013–2014 offered another extensive presentation of the artist's work. In 2019–2010 the Morgan Library & Museum held of an exhibit of his drawings titled, Guercino: Virtuoso Draftsman. A catalogue was published in conjunction with the exhibit.

== Sources ==
Books and articles on Guercino

- Griswold, William M (1991). "Guercino". Metropolitan Museum of Art Bulletin. 48 (4): 5–56. doi:10.2307/3258858. JSTOR 3258858.
- Lanzi, Luigi (1847). History of Painting in Italy; From the Period of the Revival of the Fine Arts to the End of the Eighteenth Century. Vol. III. Translated by Thomas Roscoe. London: Henry G. Bohn.
- Mahon, Denis (1937a). "Notes on the Young Guercino I. – Cento and Bologna". The Burlington Magazine for Connoisseurs. 70 (408): 112–122. JSTOR 866850.
- Mahon, Denis (1937b). "Notes on the Young Guercino II. – Cento and Ferrara". The Burlington Magazine for Connoisseurs. 70 (409): 177–189. JSTOR 866750.
- Mahon, Denis (1992). Guercino: Master Painter of Baroque. National Gallery of Art. ISBN 978-0-89468-167-7.
- Marciari, John (2019). Guercino: Virtuoso Draftsman. New York, NY : The Morgan Library & Museum. ISBN 978-19113-0069-4
- Miller, Dwight C. (1964). "Barbieri, Giovanni Francesco detto il Guercino". Dizionario Biografico degli Italiani (in Italian). Vol. 6.
- Orlandi, Pellegrino Antonio; Guarienti, Pietro (1719), Abecedario pittorico, Naples.
- Posner, Donald (1968). "The Guercino Exhibition at Bologna". The Burlington Magazine. 110 (788): 596–607. JSTOR 875813.
- Scholtz, Sibylle; MacMorris, Lee; Krogmann, Frank; Auffarth, Gerd U (2019). "Lights and darks of a picture. The life of Giovanni Francesco Barbieri, "il Guercino" – the squinter". Strabismus. 27 (1): 39–42. doi:10.1080/09273972.2019.1559532. PMID 30626256. S2CID 58585811. (subscription required)
- van Serooskerken, Carel van Tuyll (1991). "Guercino. Bologna, Cento and Frankfurt". The Burlington Magazine. 133 (1065): 864–868. JSTOR 885077.
- Stone, David M (1991). Guercino: Catalogo Completo Dei Dipinti (in Italian). Cantini. ISBN 978-88-7737-137-9.
- Turner, Nicholas (2003). "Guercino". Oxford Art Online. Oxford Art Online (Grove Art). doi:10.1093/gao/9781884446054.article.t035416. ISBN 9781884446054. (subscription required)
- Unger, Daniel M (2016). Guercino's Paintings and His Patrons' Politics in Early Modern Italy. Routledge. ISBN 978-1-351-56482-3.
- Vivian, Frances (1971). "Guercino Seen from the Archivio Barberini". The Burlington Magazine. 113 (814): 22–29. JSTOR 876502.
- Vodret, Rossella; Gozzi, Fausto (2011). Guercino (1591–1666): capolavori da Cento e da Roma (in Italian). Giunti. ISBN 9788809775350.
