= List of municipalities of the Province of Reggio Emilia =

The following is a list of the 42 municipalities (comuni) of the Province of Reggio Emilia in the region of Emilia-Romagna in Italy.

== List ==
Municipality	Population (2026)	Area (km²)	Density
Albinea	8,986	43.89	204.7
Bagnolo in Piano	9,588	26.94	355.9
Baiso	3,268	75.55	43.3
Bibbiano	10,199	28.16	362.2
Boretto	5,456	18.11	301.3
Brescello	5,556	24.04	231.1
Cadelbosco di Sopra	10,727	43.60	246.0
Campagnola Emilia	5,551	24.39	227.6
Campegine	5,414	22.62	239.3
Canossa	3,796	53.08	71.5
Carpineti	3,905	89.57	43.6
Casalgrande	19,039	37.71	504.9
Casina	4,619	63.80	72.4
Castellarano	15,160	58.06	261.1
Castelnovo di Sotto	8,707	35.01	248.7
Castelnovo ne' Monti	10,407	96.68	107.6
Cavriago	9,947	17.02	584.4
Correggio	25,234	77.51	325.6
Fabbrico	6,931	23.63	293.3
Gattatico	5,823	42.15	138.1
Gualtieri	6,364	35.65	178.5
Guastalla	14,675	52.93	277.3
Luzzara	8,577	38.54	222.5
Montecchio Emilia	10,441	24.39	428.1
Novellara	13,406	58.11	230.7
Poviglio	7,240	43.55	166.2
Quattro Castella	13,226	46.31	285.6
Reggio nell'Emilia	172,921	230.66	749.7
Reggiolo	9,318	42.68	218.3
Rio Saliceto	6,099	22.56	270.3
Rolo	4,040	14.17	285.1
Rubiera	14,522	25.19	576.5
San Martino in Rio	8,246	22.72	362.9
San Polo d'Enza	6,140	32.29	190.2
Sant'Ilario d'Enza	11,423	20.23	564.7
Scandiano	25,979	50.05	519.1
Toano	4,189	67.25	62.3
Ventasso	3,824	258.19	14.8
Vetto	1,802	53.37	33.8
Vezzano sul Crostolo	4,433	37.82	117.2
Viano	3,472	44.97	77.2
Villa Minozzo	3,507	168.08	20.9

== See also ==
- List of municipalities of Emilia-Romagna
- List of municipalities of Italy
