= Bifora (architecture) =

Window vertically split into two openings topped by arches

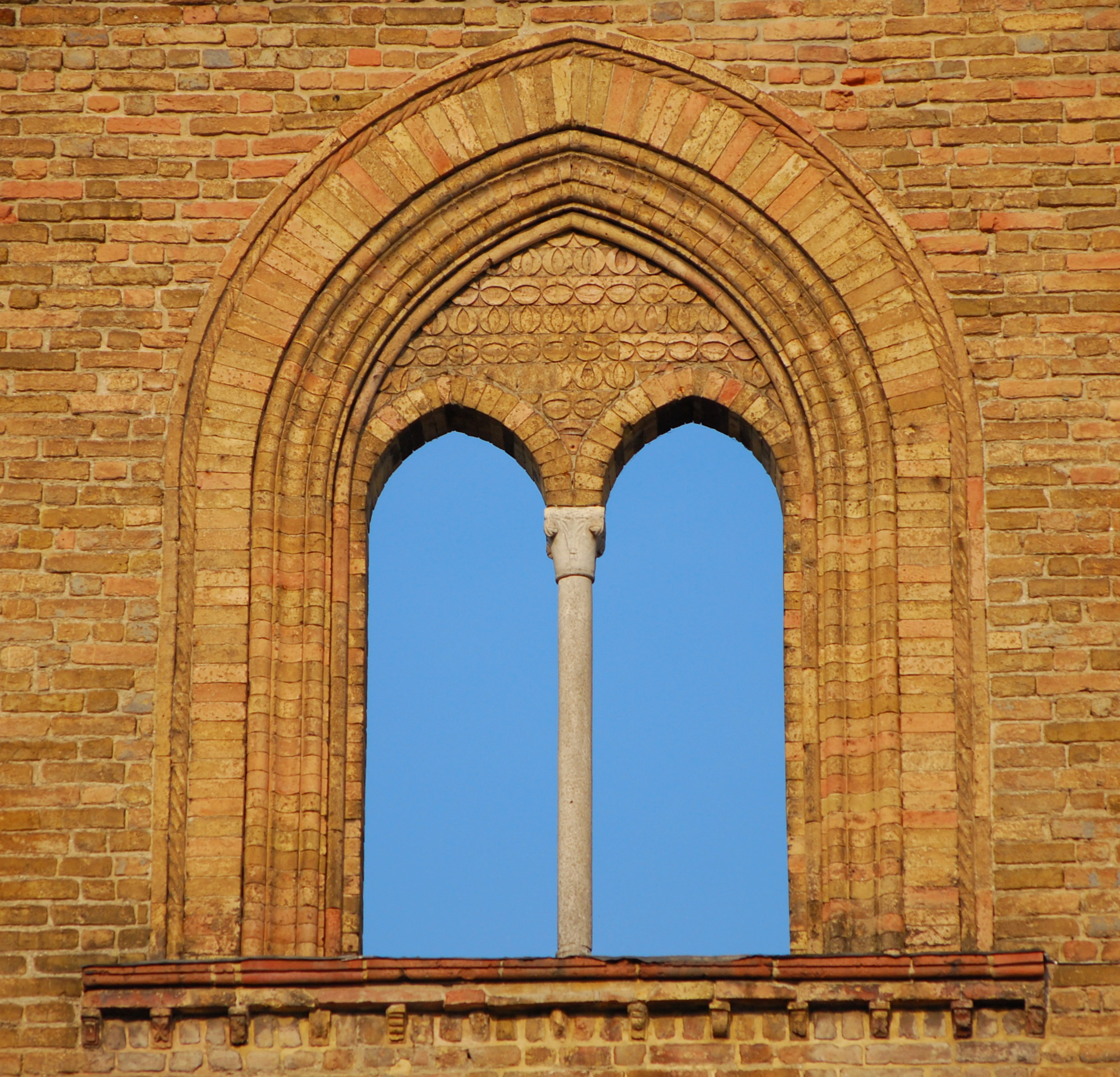
An open-sky bifora (San Francesco, Lodi, Italy)

In architecture, a bifora is a type of window divided vertically into two openings by a small column or a mullion or a pilaster; the openings are topped by arches, round or pointed. Sometimes the bifora is framed by a further arch; the space between the two arches may be decorated with a coat of arms or a small circular opening (oculus).

The earliest known instance of twin windows parted by a slender pillar occurred in Cordoba’s Alminar de San Juan, an Umayyad minaret dating back to the ninth century. The bifora was used in Italian structures such as the Basilica of Sant'Apollinare Nuovo in Ravenna. The basilica's current façade, which features a portico, dates to the 16th century, while the adjacent tower dates to the 10th century. Typical of the Romanesque and Gothic periods, in which it became an ornamental motif for windows and belfries, the bifora was also often used during the Renaissance period. In Baroque architecture and Neoclassical architecture the bifora was largely forgotten, or replaced by elements like the three openings of the Venetian window. It was also copied in the Moorish architecture in Spain, where it is called ajimez (from Arabic ash-shammīs).

It returned in vogue in the nineteenth century in the period of eclecticism and rediscovery of the ancient styles in Gothic Revival and Romanesque Revival architecture.

== Gallery ==
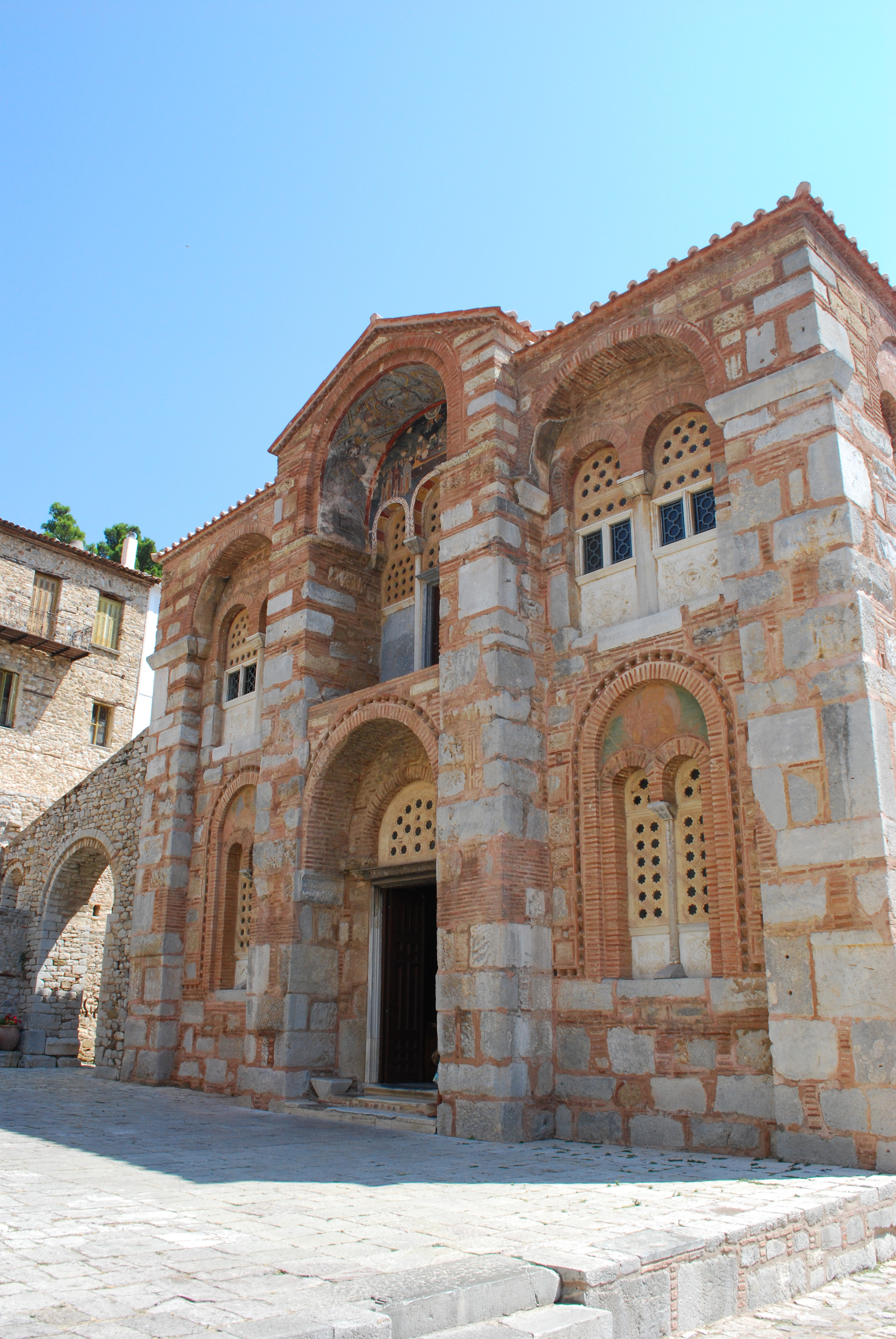
11th-century monastery of Hosios Loukas in Greece, representative of Byzantine style under the Macedonian dynasty

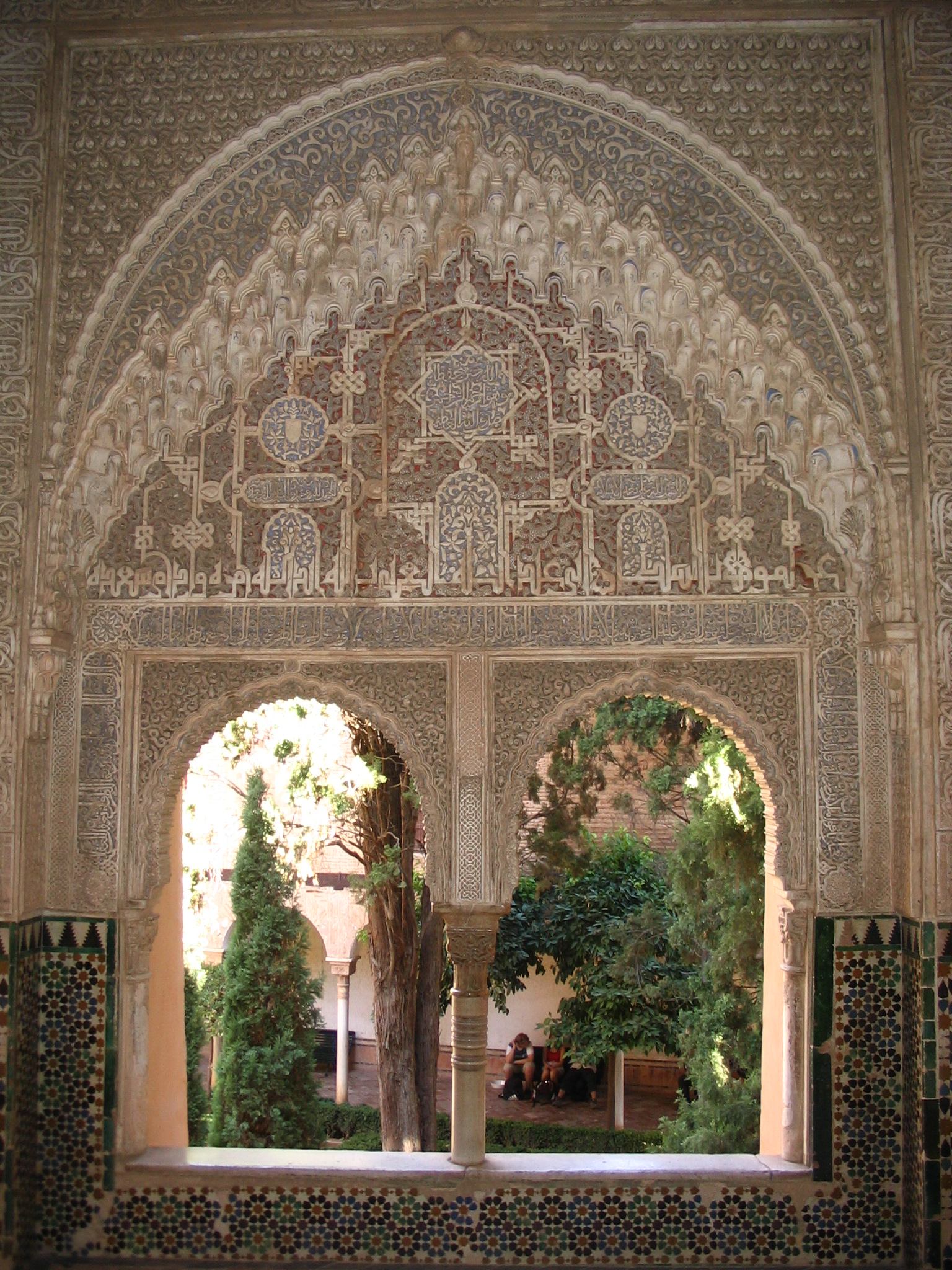
Alhambra, Granada

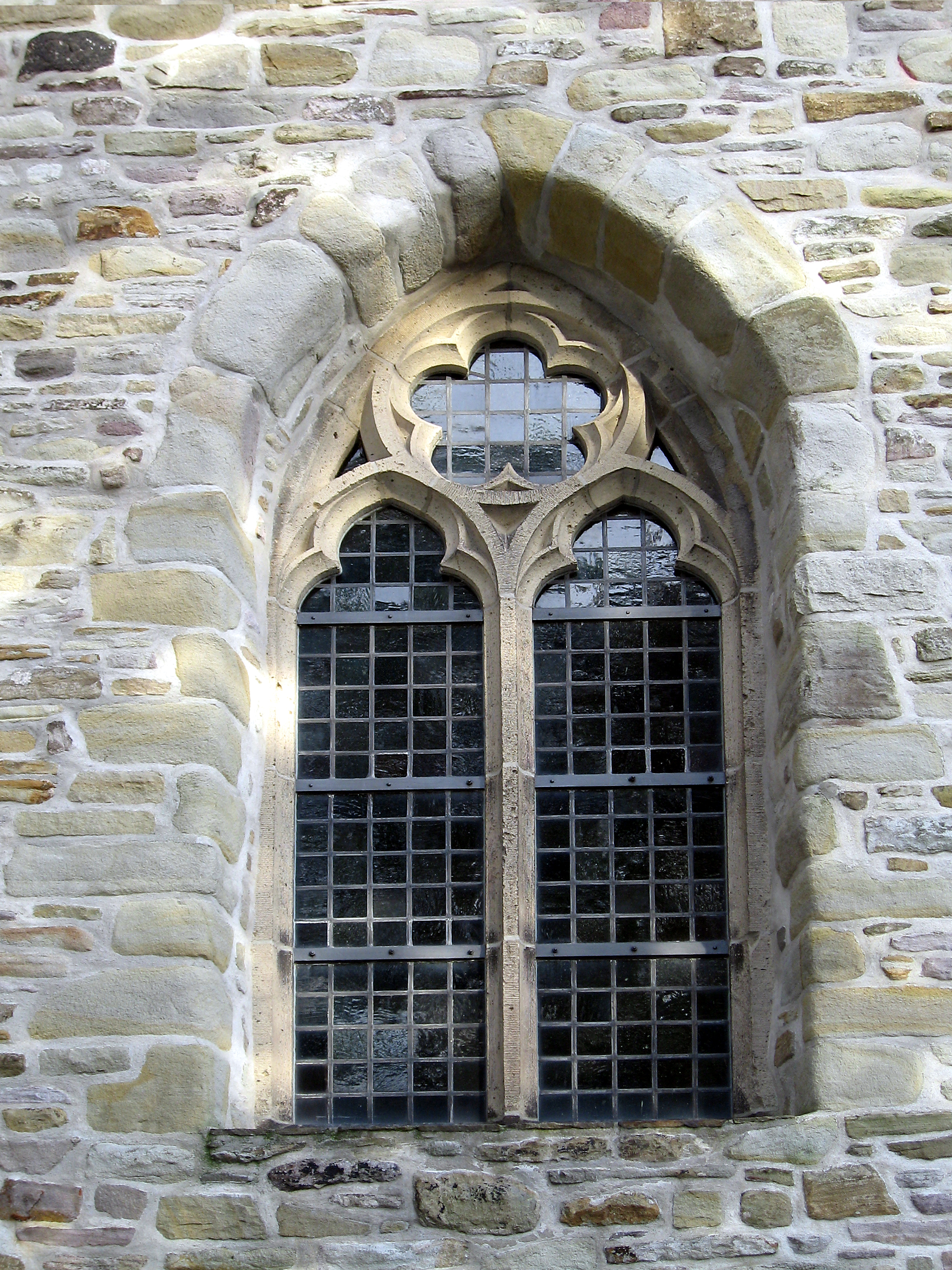
A Gothic bifora, Bochum-Stiepel (Germany)

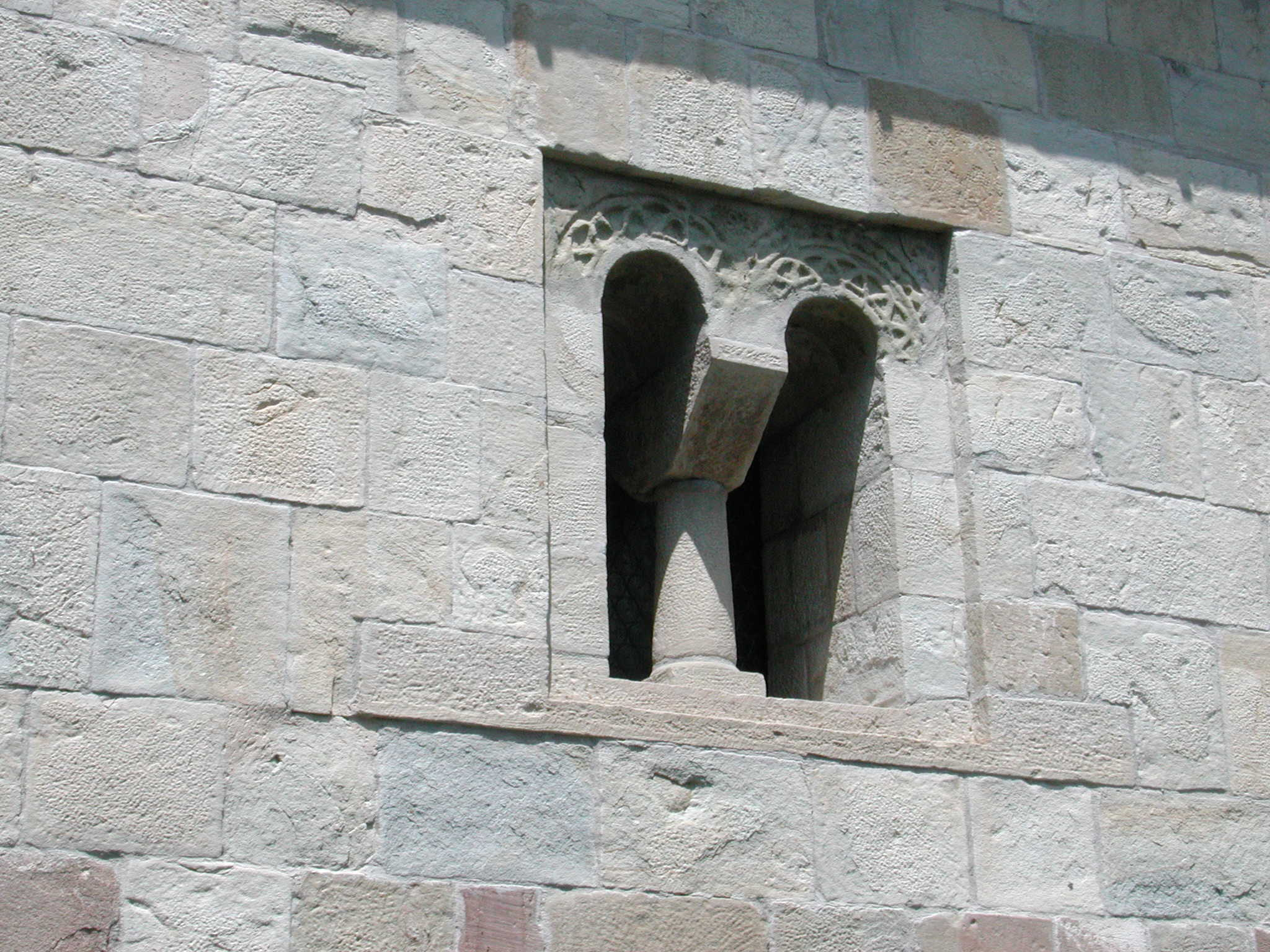
A Romanic bifora, Casina, Oratorio di Beleo

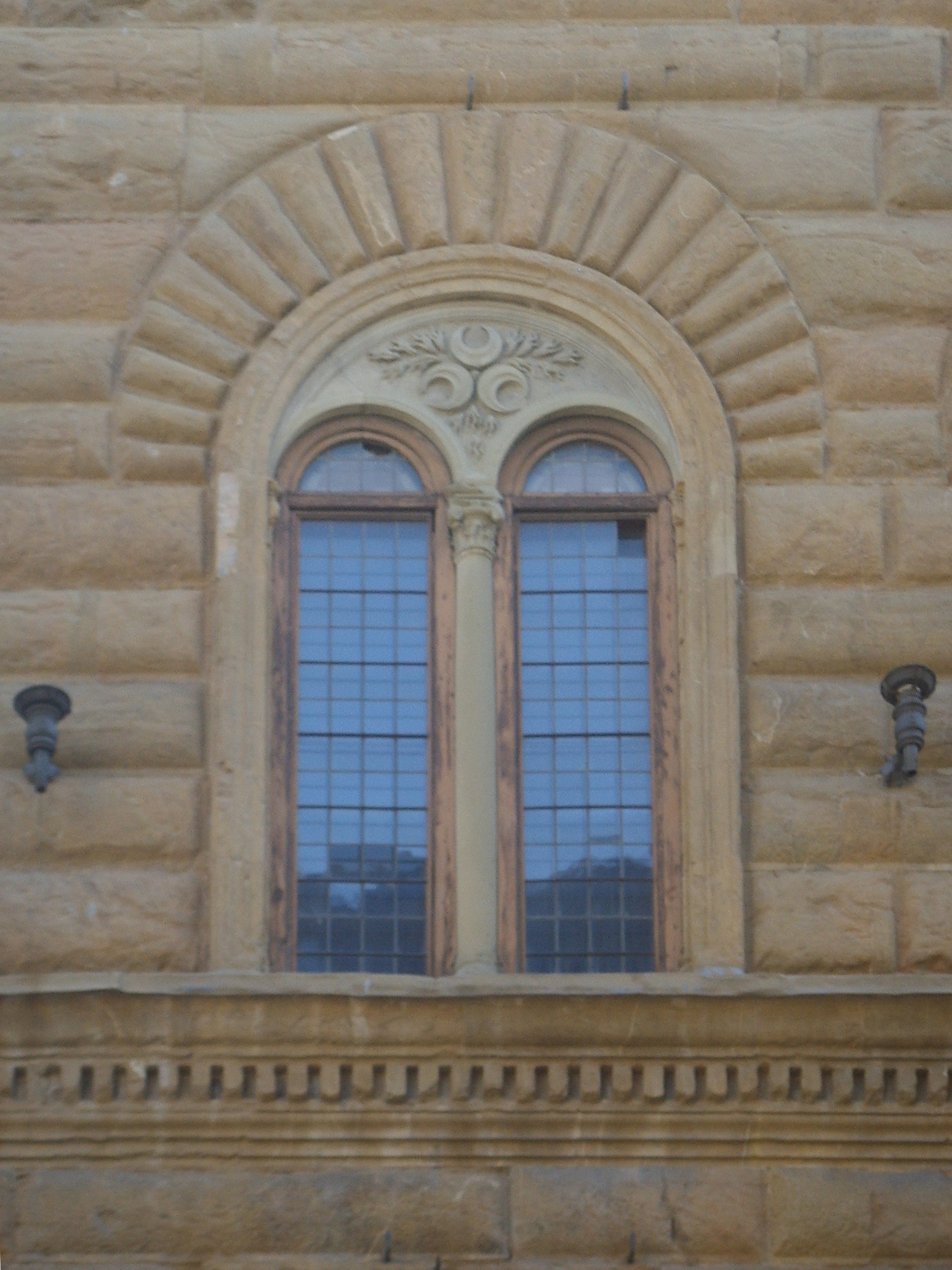
Palazzo Strozzi, Florence

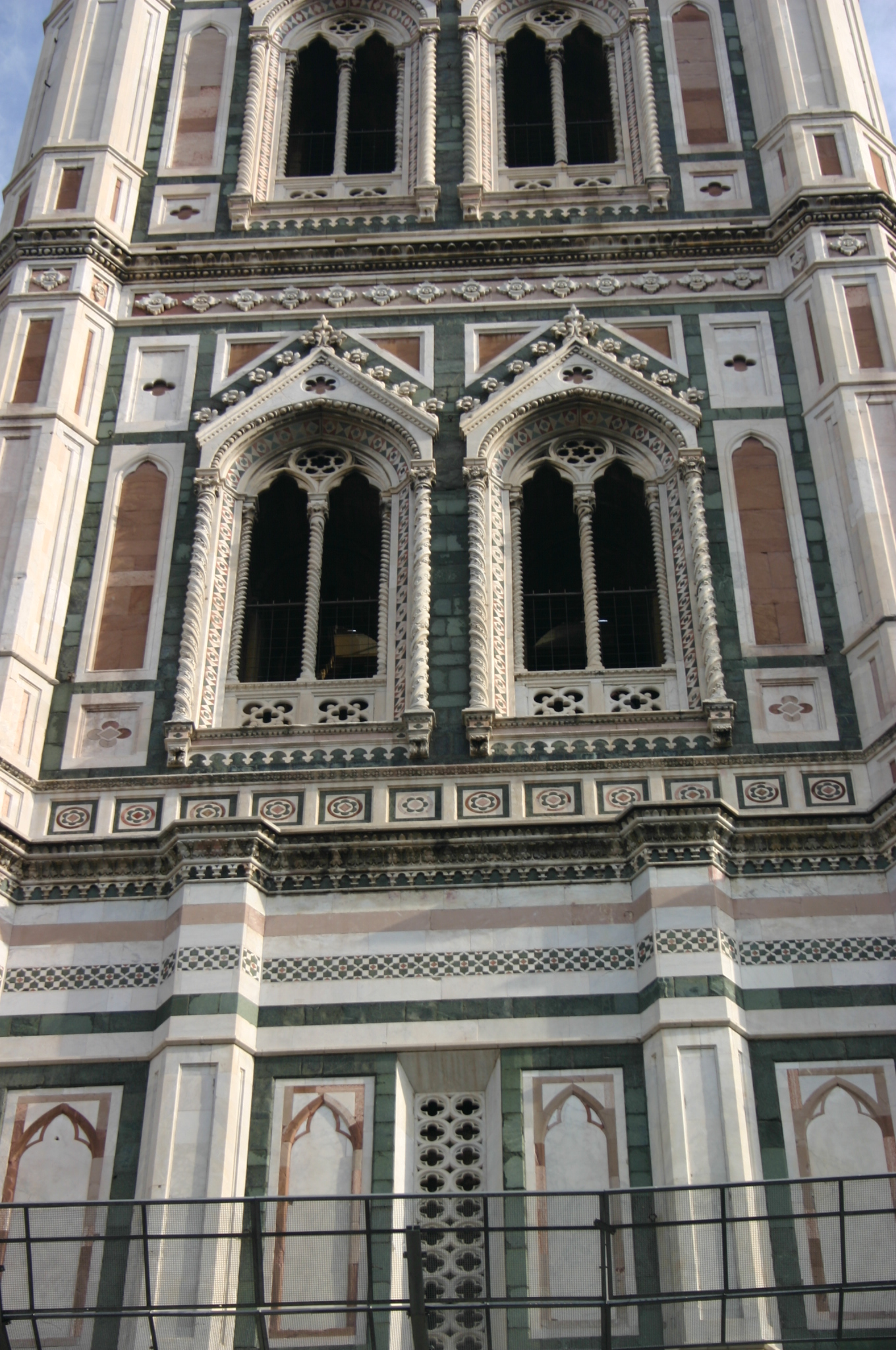
Campanile di Giotto, Florence

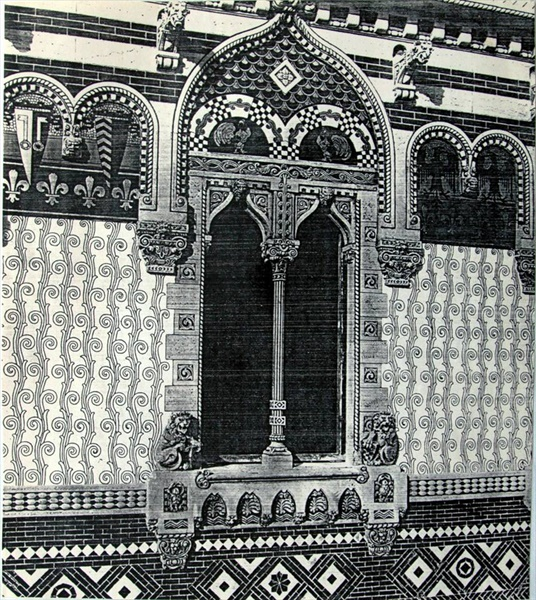
Palazzo del Granchio, Messina

== See also ==
- Monofora
- Trifora
- Quadrifora
- Polifora
