= Albinea =

- Comune
- Comune di Albinea
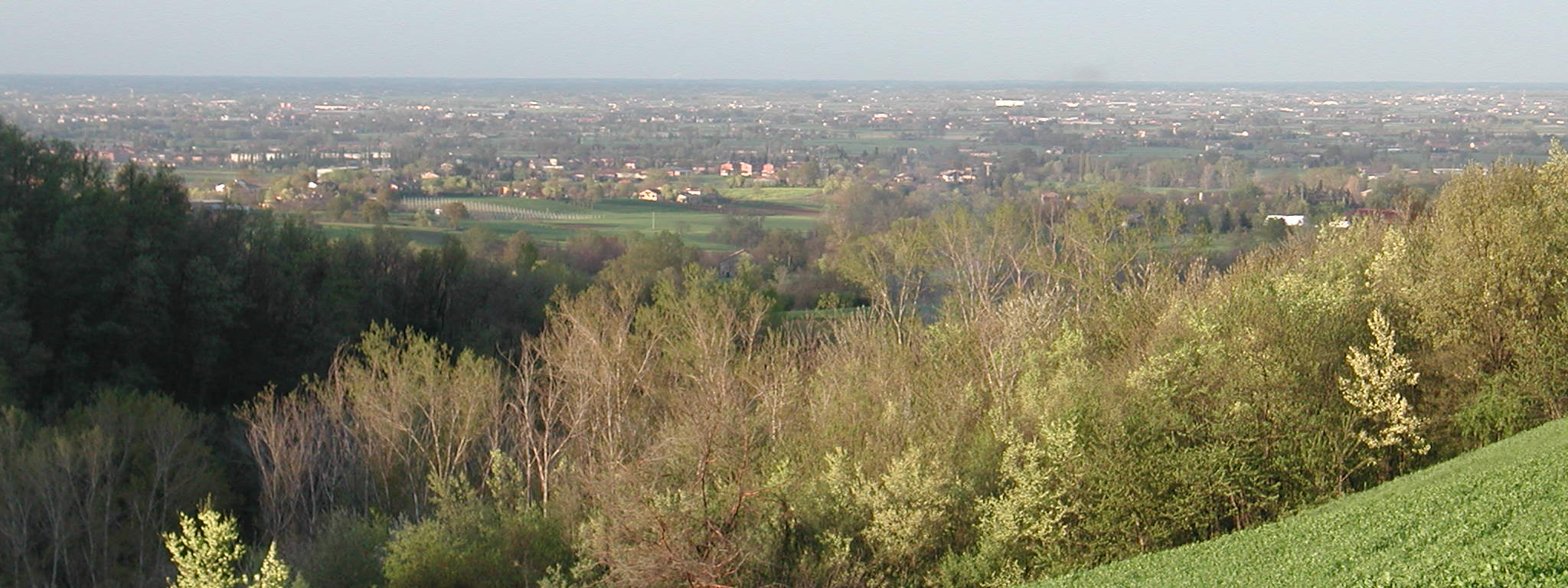
- View from Albinea towards Reggio Emilia.

- Location within Italy Location within Emilia-Romagna
- Coordinates: 44°37′N 10°36′E
- Country: Italy
- Region: Emilia-Romagna
- Province: Reggio Emilia (RE)
- Frazioni: Borzano, Botteghe, Broletto, Ca' dei Duchi, Case Spadoni, Caselline, Chiesa Albinea, Crostolo, Dallarosta, Fondo Oca, Gameda, Il Casone, La Russia, Montericco, Pareto di Sotto, Ponticelli, San Giacomo, Vitala

Government
  - Mayor: Nico Giberti

Area
  - Total: 44.02 km^{2} (17.00 sq mi)
- Elevation: 166 m (545 ft)

Population (31 December 2016)
  - Total: 8,821
  - Density: 200.4/km^{2} (519.0/sq mi)
- Demonym: Albinetani
- Time zone: UTC+1 (CET)
  - Summer (DST): UTC+2 (CEST)
- Postal code: 42020
- Dialing code: 0522
- Website: Official website

Albinea (Reggiano: Albinèa or La Fôla) is a comune (municipality) in the Province of Reggio Emilia in the Italian region Emilia-Romagna, located about 60 kilometres (37 mi) west of Bologna and about 10 kilometres (6 mi) southwest of Reggio nell'Emilia.

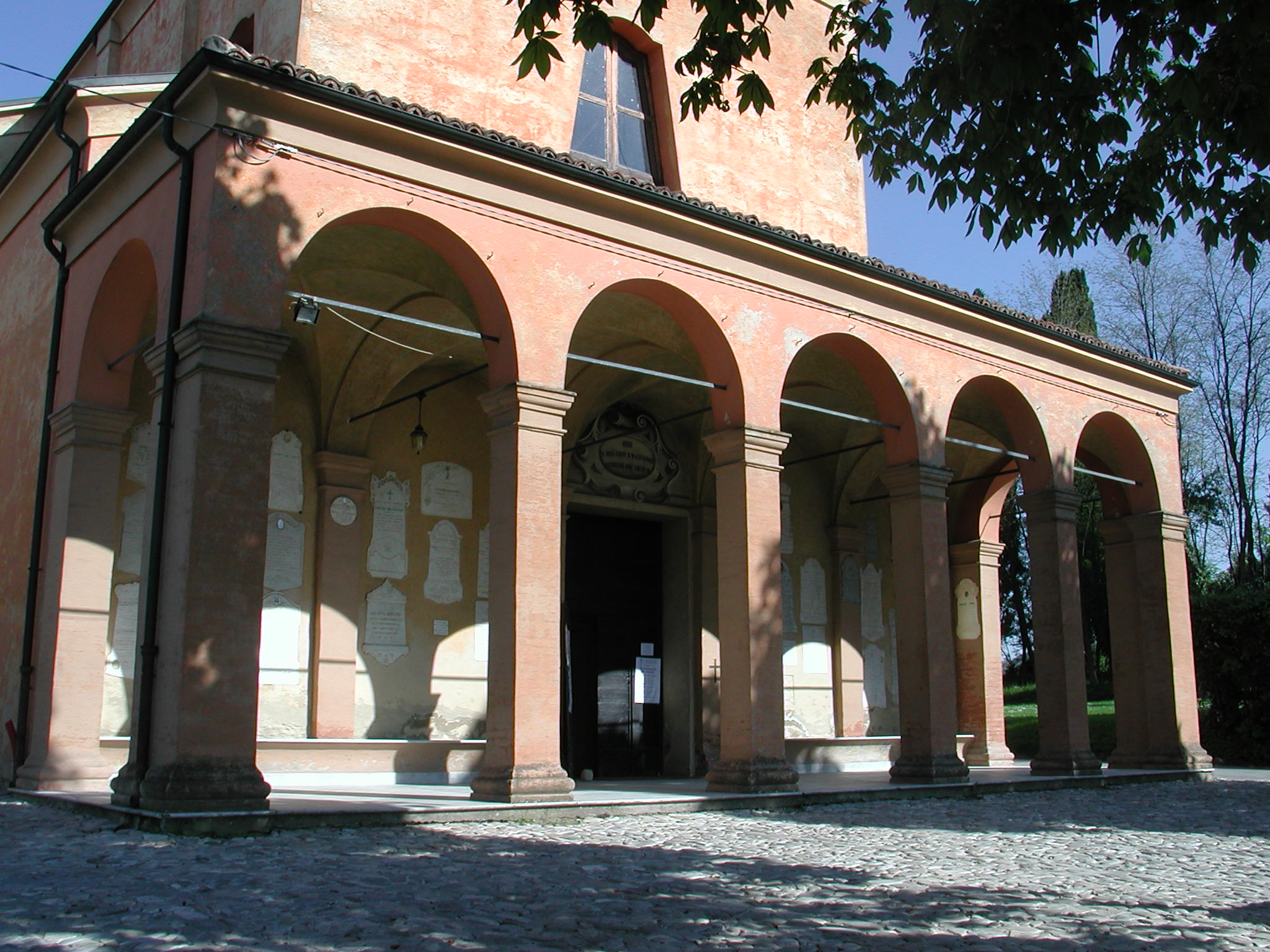
The ancient church of Albinea

A document shows that in 980 Holy Roman Emperor Otto II recognized the existence and rights of the ancient Pieve (parish church) of Albinea. From 1070 it was a possession of the bishops of Reggio, who also had a place here. Later, from 1412, it was a fief of the Manfredi family, who held it until 1730.

Albinea borders with the following municipalities: Quattro Castella, Reggio Emilia, Scandiano, Vezzano sul Crostolo, Viano.

Although historically a rural village, Albinea is now a urban area. The short distance from Reggio Emilia allows many citizens to commute daily.

== Twin towns ==
Albinea is twinned with:

- Treptow-Köpenick, Germany, since 1997
