= Vezzano sul Crostolo =

- Comune
- Comune di Vezzano sul Crostolo
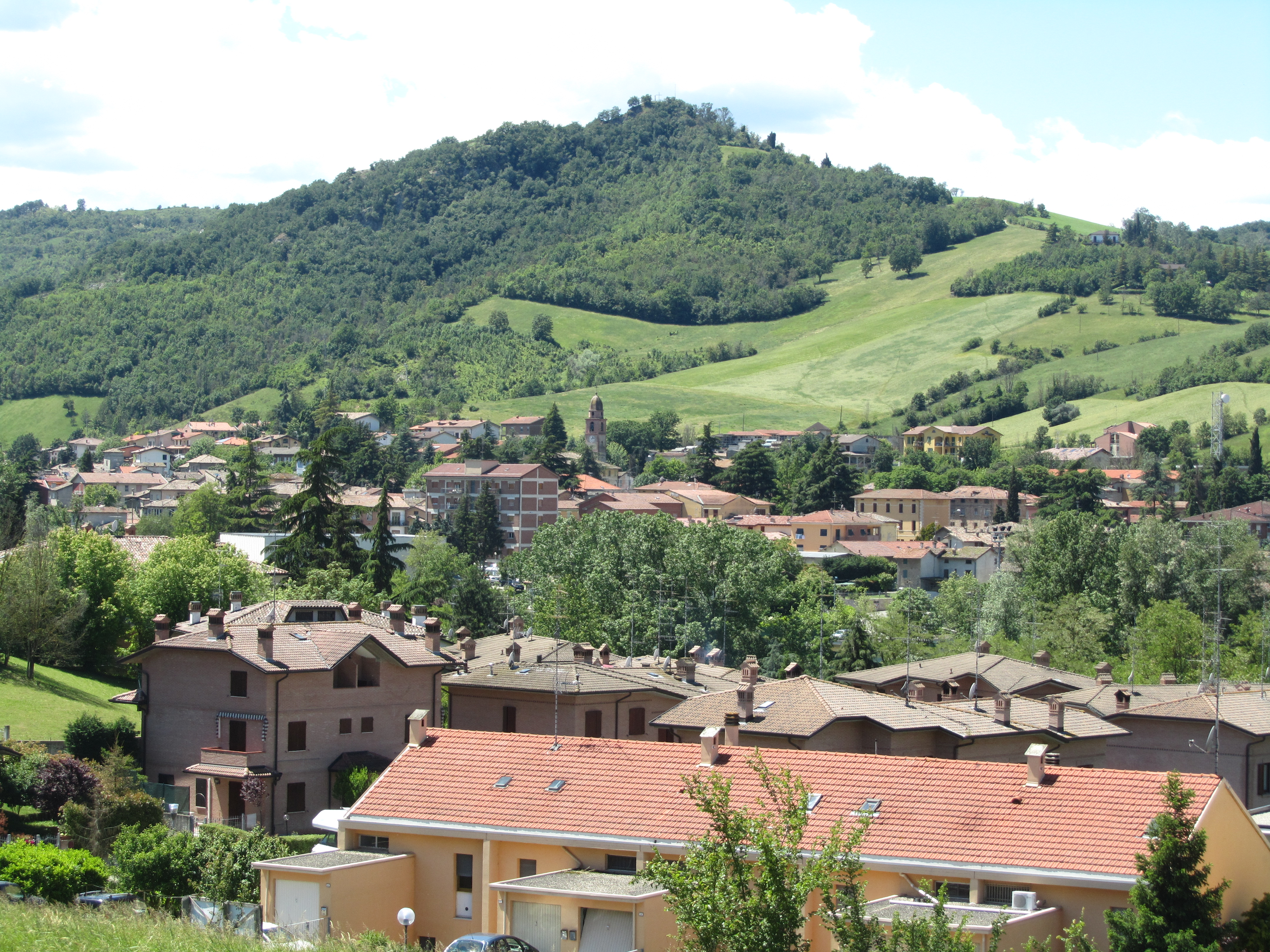
- View of Vezzano sul Crostolo

- Location within Italy Location within Emilia-Romagna
- Coordinates: 44°36′N 10°33′E
- Country: Italy
- Region: Emilia-Romagna
- Province: Reggio Emilia (RE)
- Frazioni: Bettola Ca' Caprari, Ca' di Rosino, Casaratta, Case Martini, Casoletta, Il Poggio, La Fornace, La Vecchia, Marmazza, Paderna, Pecorile, Pedergnano, Possione, Rio Buracci, Riolo, Scarzola, Villa, Vindè, Vronco

Government
  - Mayor: Mauro Bigi

Area
  - Total: 37.82 km^{2} (14.60 sq mi)
- Elevation: 166 m (545 ft)

Population (31 December 2016)
  - Total: 4,246
  - Density: 112.3/km^{2} (290.8/sq mi)
- Demonym: Vezzanesi
- Time zone: UTC+1 (CET)
  - Summer (DST): UTC+2 (CEST)
- Postal code: 42030
- Dialing code: 0522
- Website: Official website

Vezzano sul Crostolo (Reggiano: Vsân) is a comune (municipality) in the Province of Reggio Emilia in the Italian region Emilia-Romagna, located about 60 kilometres (37 mi) west of Bologna and about 13 kilometres (8 mi) southwest of Reggio Emilia.

Vezzano sul Crostolo borders the following municipalities: Albinea, Casina, Canossa, Quattro Castella, San Polo d'Enza, Viano.
