= Sorbolo =

- Comune
- Comune di Sorbolo
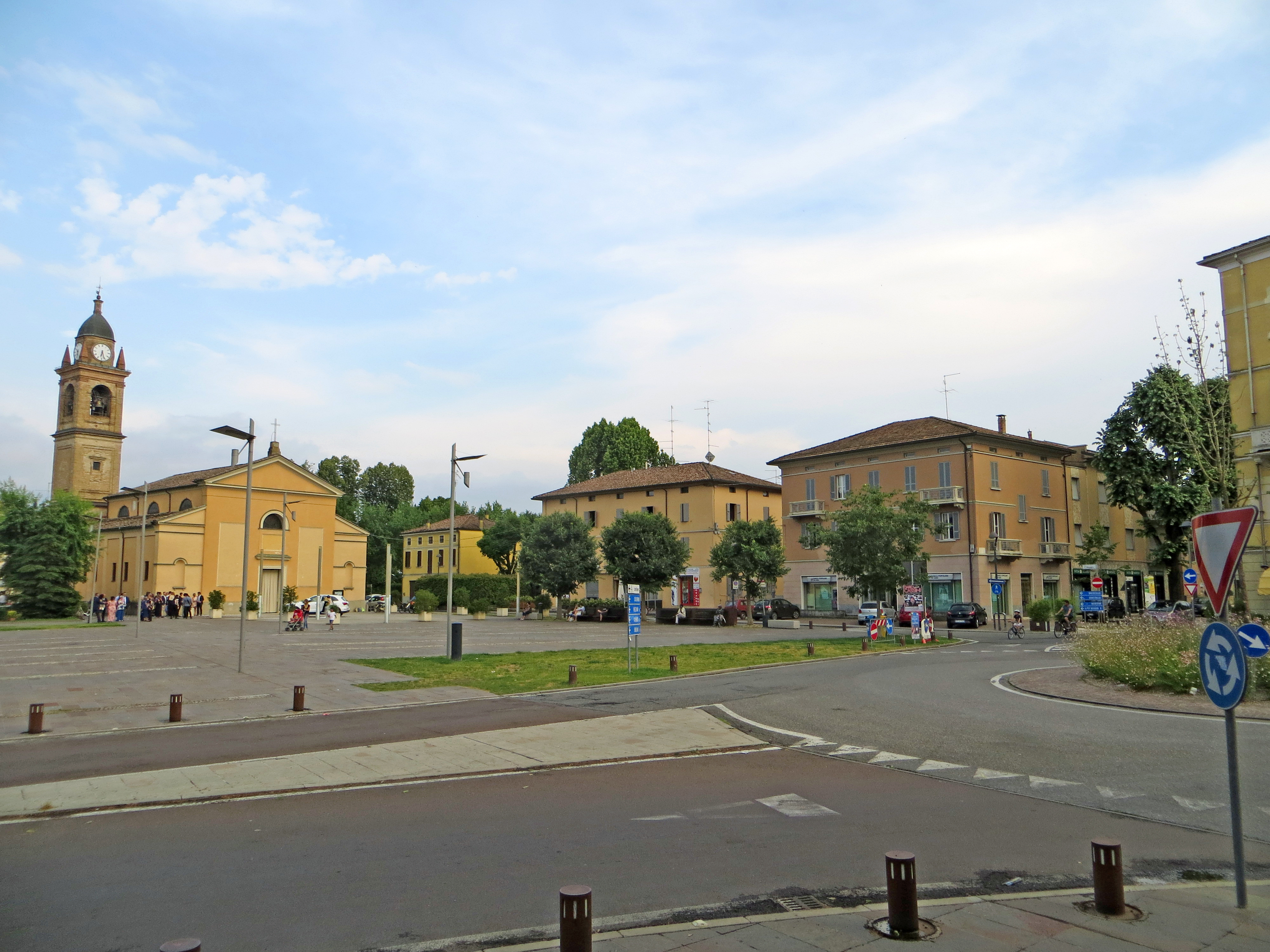
- Piazza della Libertà

- Location within Italy Location within Emilia-Romagna
- Coordinates: 44°51′N 10°27′E
- Country: Italy
- Region: Emilia-Romagna
- Province: Parma (PR)
- Frazioni: Alba, Bogolese, Casaltone, Chiozzola, Coenzo, Corte Godi, Croce dei Morti, Enzano, Frassinara, Ramoscello

Government
  - Mayor: Nicola Cesari

Area
  - Total: 39.33 km^{2} (15.19 sq mi)
- Elevation: 34 m (112 ft)

Population (30 September 2018)
  - Total: 7,444
  - Density: 189.3/km^{2} (490.2/sq mi)
- Demonym: Sorbolesi
- Time zone: UTC+1 (CET)
  - Summer (DST): UTC+2 (CEST)
- Postal code: 43058
- Dialing code: 0521
- ISTAT code: 034037
- Patron saint: Sts. Faustinus and Jovita
- Saint day: 15 February
- Website: Official website

Sorbolo (Parmigiano: Sòrbol; locally Sòrbel) is a comune (municipality) in the Province of Parma in the Italian region Emilia-Romagna, located about 80 kilometres (50 mi) northwest of Bologna and about 11 kilometres (7 mi) northeast of Parma.

Sorbolo borders the following municipalities: Brescello, Gattatico, Mezzani, Parma.

== Twin towns ==
- Viriat, France, since 2000
