= Oratorio di Beleo =

Oratory in Casina, Italy

Coordinates: 44.493891°N 10.46146°E

The Oratorio di Beleo is a rural Romanesque-style, Roman Catholic chapel-church located in the frazione of Beleo, outside of the town of Casina, province of Reggio Emilia, region of Emilia Romagna, Italy.

== History ==
Documents from 980 record the Ottone II, Otto II, Holy Roman Emperor granting the chapel to the bishop of Reggio. It is documented in 1070 as being once in the possessions of Bonifacio di Canossa. By 1575, documents noted a planned restoration. The structure is a simple stone building restored after damaging bombardment during the Second World War. The 1952 portal has an epigraph reading: "CEU PHONICA ULTRO EX OSSIBUS ET MEDULLIS RENATUM BENIAMIN REGIEN EPUS FAUSTA RECONCILLATIONE LUSTRVIT - VII KAL. JUN. A. SAL. MCMLII". The structure retains medieval windows and the nave has Romanesque columns with sculpted designs. A series of plaques recalls Italian alpine soldiers fallen in wars.
