= Campagnola Emilia =

- Comune
- Comune di Campagnola Emilia
- Location within Italy Location within Emilia-Romagna
- Coordinates: 44°50′N 10°46′E
- Country: Italy
- Region: Emilia-Romagna
- Province: Reggio Emilia (RE)
- Frazioni: Cognento, Ponte Vettigano

Government
  - Mayor: Alessandro Santachiara

Area
  - Total: 24.7 km^{2} (9.5 sq mi)
- Elevation: 22 m (72 ft)

Population (31 December 2017)
  - Total: 5,639
  - Density: 228/km^{2} (591/sq mi)
- Demonym: Campagnolesi
- Time zone: UTC+1 (CET)
  - Summer (DST): UTC+2 (CEST)
- Postal code: 42012
- Dialing code: 0522
- Website: Official website

Campagnola Emilia (Reggiano: Campagnôla) is a comune (municipality) in the Province of Reggio Emilia in the Italian region Emilia-Romagna, located about 60 kilometres (37 mi) northwest of Bologna and about 25 kilometres (16 mi) northeast of Reggio Emilia.

Campagnola Emilia borders the following municipalities: Correggio, Fabbrico, Novellara, Reggiolo, Rio Saliceto.
