= Baiso =

- Comune
- Comune di Baiso
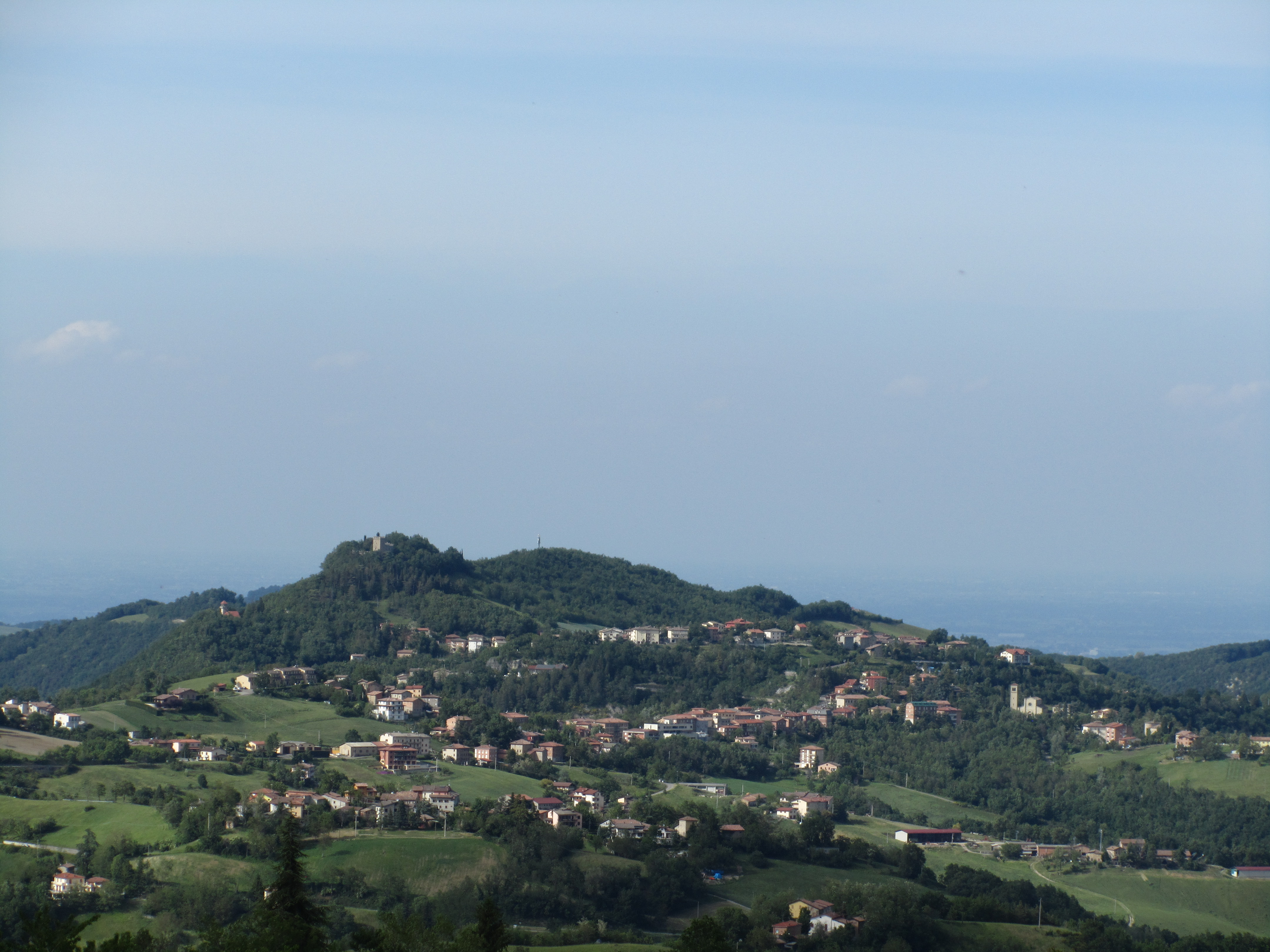

- Coat of arms

- Location within Italy Location within Emilia-Romagna
- Coordinates: 44°30′N 10°36′E
- Country: Italy
- Region: Emilia-Romagna
- Province: Reggio Emilia (RE)
- Frazioni: Antignola, Borgo Visignolo, Ca' del Pino Basso, Ca' Dorio, Ca' Talami, Caliceto, Calita, Capagnano, Carano, Casale, Casella, Casino Levizzano, Casone Lucenta, Casone Marcuzzo, Cassinago, Castagneto, Castelvecchio, Corciolano, Debbia, Fontanella, Gambarelli, Gavia, Granata, Guilguella, Lugara, Lugo, Maestà, Magliatica Sopra, Montefaraone, Montipò, Muraglione, Osteria Vecchia, Paderna, Piola, Ponte Giorgella, Ponte Secchia, Riviera, Ronchi, San Cassiano Chiesa, San Romano Chiesa, Sasso Gattone, Teneggia, Torrazzo, Villa

Government
  - Mayor: Fabrizio Corti

Area
  - Total: 75.3 km^{2} (29.1 sq mi)
- Elevation: 542 m (1,778 ft)

Population (31 December 2016)
  - Total: 3,285
  - Density: 43.6/km^{2} (113/sq mi)
- Demonym: Baisani
- Time zone: UTC+1 (CET)
  - Summer (DST): UTC+2 (CEST)
- Postal code: 42031
- Dialing code: 0522

Baiso (Reggiano: Baîṣ) is a comune (municipality) in the Province of Reggio Emilia in the Italian region Emilia-Romagna, located about 60 kilometres (37 mi) west of Bologna and about 20 kilometres (12 mi) south of Reggio Emilia.

Baiso borders the following municipalities: Carpineti, Castellarano, Prignano sulla Secchia, Toano, Viano. It counts the hamlets (frazioni) of Debbia, Levizzano, San Cassiano, San Romano and Visignolo.

Baiso is a member of Cittaslow.
