= Castellarano =

- Comune
- Comune di Castellarano
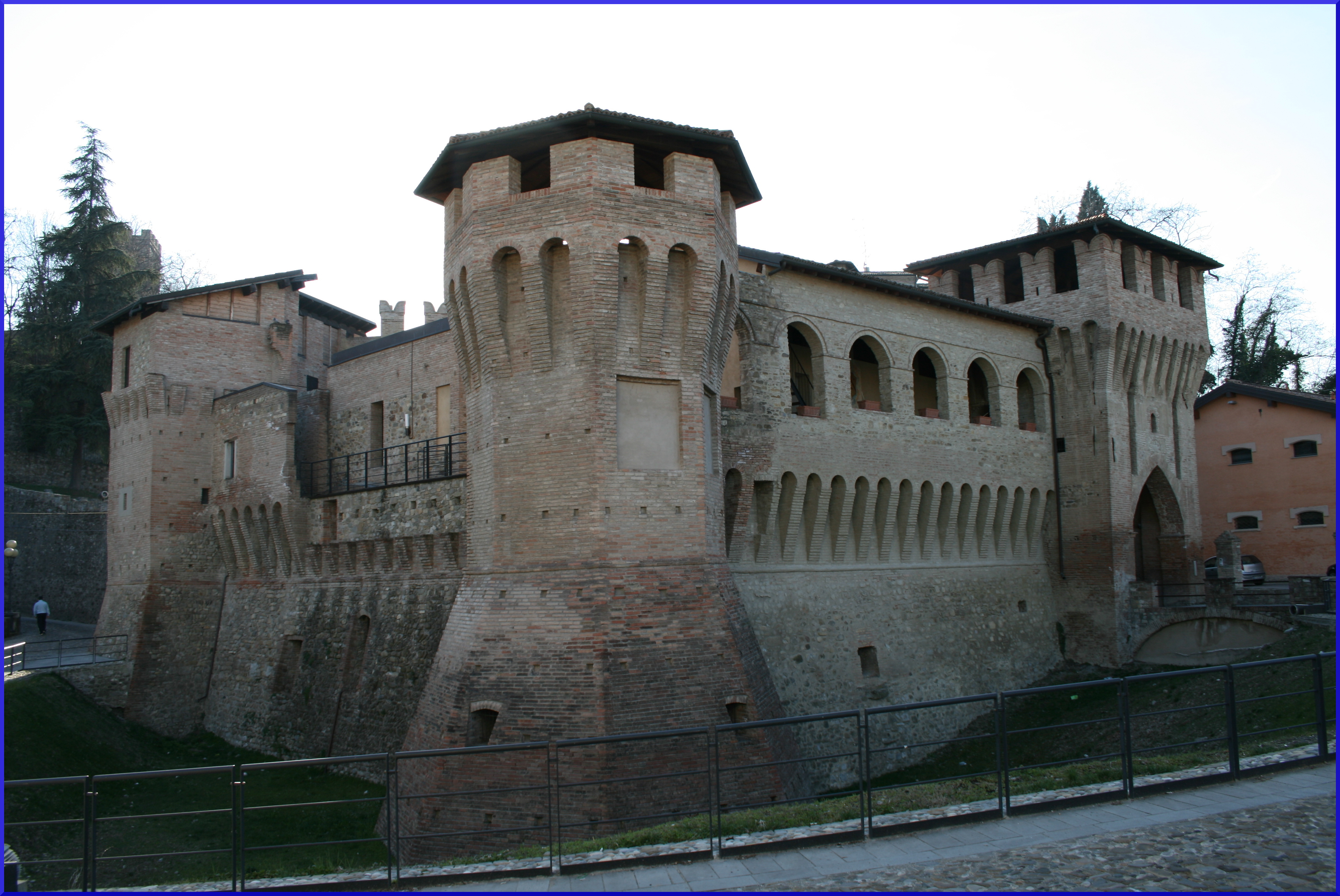
- Rocchetta Castellarano

- Coat of arms

- Location within Italy Location within Emilia-Romagna
- Coordinates: 44°34′N 10°47′E
- Country: Italy
- Region: Emilia-Romagna
- Province: Reggio Emilia (RE)
- Frazioni: Ca' de Grimaldi, Ca' de Ravazzini, Cadiroggio, Case Ferri, Castello La Croce, Farneto di Sotto, Le Ville, Montebabbio, Pradivia, Roteglia, Scuole, Telarolo, San Valentino, Tressano, Ca De Fi,

Government
  - Mayor: Giorgio Zanni

Area
  - Total: 58.06 km^{2} (22.42 sq mi)
- Elevation: 149 m (489 ft)

Population (31 December 2017)
  - Total: 15,326
  - Density: 264.0/km^{2} (683.7/sq mi)
- Demonym: Castellaranesi
- Time zone: UTC+1 (CET)
  - Summer (DST): UTC+2 (CEST)
- Postal code: 42014
- Dialing code: 0536
- Website: Official website

Castellarano (Reggiano: Castlarân) is a comune (municipality) in the Province of Reggio Emilia in the Italian region Emilia-Romagna, located about 45 kilometres (28 mi) west of Bologna and about 20 kilometres (12 mi) southeast of Reggio Emilia.

Castellarano borders the following municipalities: Baiso, Casalgrande, Prignano sulla Secchia, Sassuolo, Scandiano, Viano.

== See also ==
- Castles of the Duchy
