= Casina =

- Comune
- Comune di Casina
- Location within Italy Location within Emilia-Romagna
- Coordinates: 44°31′N 10°29′E
- Country: Italy
- Region: Emilia-Romagna
- Province: Reggio Emilia (RE)
- Frazioni: Banzola, Barazzone, Beleo, Bergogno, Bettola, Bocco, Boschi, Braglio, Brugna, Casaleo, Casetico, Castignola, Ciolla, Cortogno, Costaferrata, Crocicchio, Faieto, Giandeto Straduzzi, Il Monte, La Ripa, Leguigno Faggeto, Lezzolo, L'Incrostolo, Migliara-Boastra, Molino di Cortogno, Monchio l'Axella, Montale, Montata, Paullo Chiesa, Sordiglio, Strada-Fabbrica, Trazara, Villa Bonini

Government
  - Mayor: Stefano Costi

Area
  - Total: 63.7 km^{2} (24.6 sq mi)
- Elevation: 574 m (1,883 ft)

Population (31 December 2016)
  - Total: 4 451
  - Density: 0.063/km^{2} (0.16/sq mi)
- Demonym: Casinesi
- Time zone: UTC+1 (CET)
  - Summer (DST): UTC+2 (CEST)
- Postal code: 42034
- Dialing code: 0522
- Website: Official website

Casina (local dialect: Caṡîna [kaˈziːna]; Reggiano: Caṡèina [kaˈzɛi̯na]) is a comune (municipality) in the Province of Reggio Emilia, in the Italian region Emilia-Romagna, located about 70 kilometres (43 miles) west of Bologna and about 25 km (16 mi) southwest of Reggio Emilia.

The municipality of Casina contains the frazioni (subdivisions, mainly villages and hamlets) Banzola, Barazzone, Beleo, Bergogno, Bettola, Bocco, Boschi, Braglio, Brugna, Casaleo, Casetico, Castignola, Ciolla, Cortogno, Costaferrata, Crocicchio, Faieto, Giandeto Straduzzi, Il Monte, La Ripa, Leguigno Faggeto, Lezzolo, L'Incrostolo, Migliara-Boastra, Molino di Cortogno, Monchio l'Axella, Montale, Montata, Paullo Chiesa, Sordiglio, Strada-Fabbrica, Trazara, and Villa Bonini.

Casina borders the following municipalities: Carpineti, Castelnovo ne' Monti, Canossa, Vezzano sul Crostolo, Viano.

The restored Oratorio di Beleo is located in the frazione of Beleo.

== Twin towns ==
Casina is twinned with:

- Fritzlar, Germany
