= Rio Saliceto =

- Comune
- Comune di Rio Saliceto
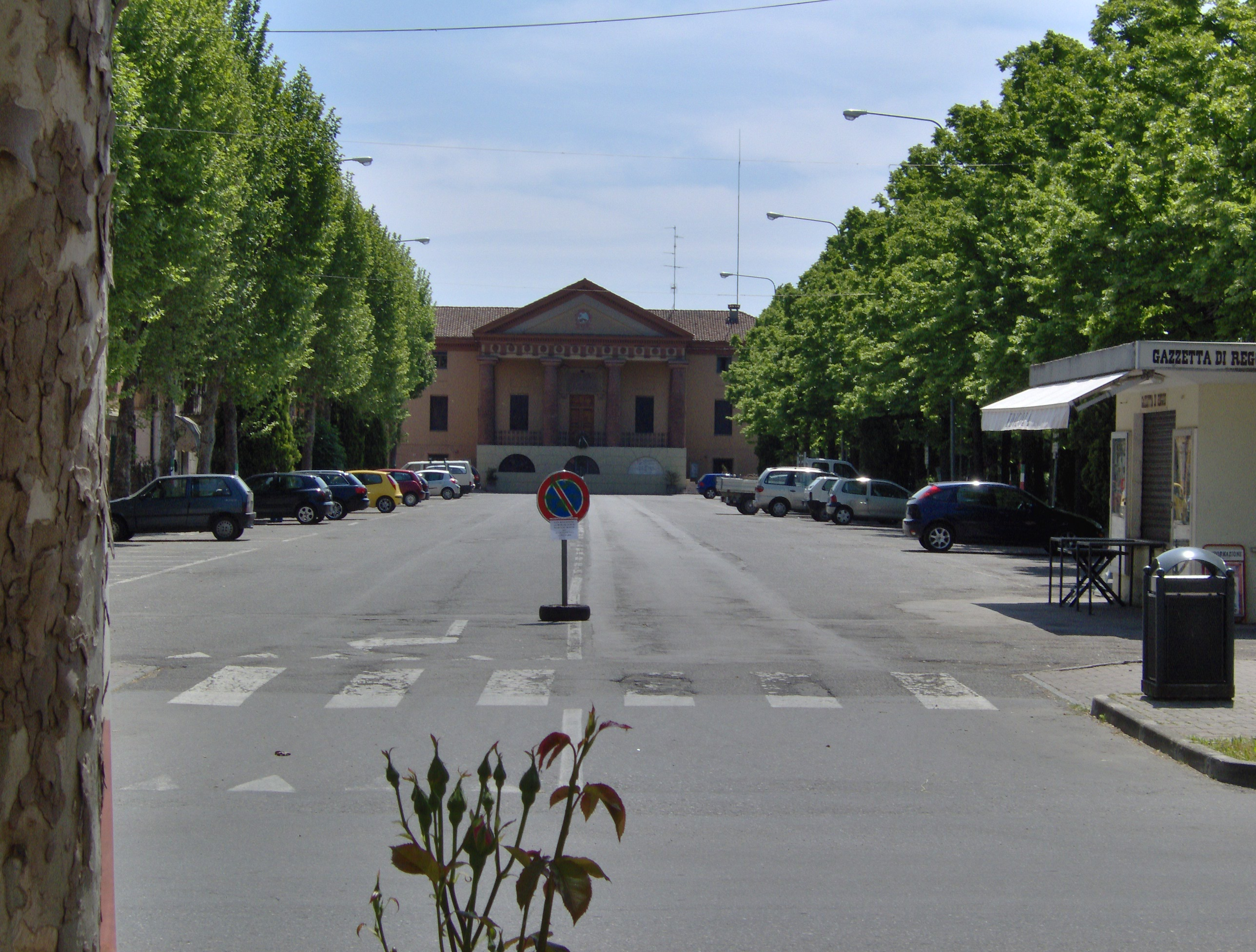
- Town hall of Rio Saliceto

- Location within Italy Location within Emilia-Romagna
- Coordinates: 44°49′N 10°48′E
- Country: Italy
- Region: Emilia-Romagna
- Province: Reggio Emilia (RE)
- Frazioni: Commenda, Osteriola, Cà de Frati, San Lodovico

Government
  - Mayor: Daniele Pietri

Area
  - Total: 22.56 km^{2} (8.71 sq mi)

Population (30 September 2019)
  - Total: 6,094
  - Density: 270.1/km^{2} (699.6/sq mi)
- Demonym: Riesi
- Time zone: UTC+1 (CET)
  - Summer (DST): UTC+2 (CEST)
- Postal code: 42010
- Dialing code: 0522
- Website: Official website

Rio Saliceto (Reggiano: Rée) is a comune (municipality) in the Province of Reggio Emilia in the Italian region Emilia-Romagna, located about 60 kilometres (37 mi) northwest of Bologna and about 20 kilometres (12 mi) northeast of Reggio Emilia.

The name derives from the canal (Rio), which divided the territory with that of Carpi, and the marsh willows that grow in the area (Saliceto).

Along with the neighbouring municipalities of Campagnola Emilia, Carpi, Correggio, Fabbrico and Rolo, it is a member of the Pianura Reggiana Union of Municipalities.

== Physical Geography ==
Rio Saliceto is located in the Po Valley, near the boundary of the province of Modena, 23 kilometres from Reggio Emilia. The municipal territory, besides the capital, is formed by the districts of Ca’ de Frati, Osteriola, Ponte Vettigano and San Ludovico, which cover an overall area of 22.56 square kilometres. The municipality of Rio Saliceto borders Fabbrico to the north, Carpi to the east, Correggio to the south and Campagnola Emilia to the west.

The municipal territory, which is entirely flat, is furrowed by a dense network of reclamation and irrigation channels, the main ones being the Naviglio to the west and the Tresinaro (to the east).

In Ca’ de Frati, there is a nature oasis within the Tresinaro expansion pools, managed by the Reclamation Consortium of Central Emilia.

== History ==
As far back as 772 AD, the territory of the current municipality was mentioned in a document of the Lombard king Desiderio.

Later it became part of Marquis Bonifazio's estate (father of the Great Countess), who transferred ownership to the Church. Then in the 13th century, it became part of the Da Correggio family estate, who hosted the Zecca del Principato at Villa Capri (what is now Via Naviglio Sud). The territory suffered the same fate as the town of Correggio, when in 1635, the principality was passed on to the Este family.

With the end of the Este domination along with the reconstruction of the municipality, promoted by the governor Luigi Carlo Farini, Rio, which until that moment had been a Villa of the municipality of Correggio, became a municipality with a government decree dated 4 December 1859, with effect from 1 January 1860. The promoters of this autonomy were Cavalier Luigi Nicolini, the first mayor Don Giovanni Battista Branchetti, the lawyer Luigi Carbonieri, and the Minister of the Interior Farini, as well as the Este landowners Luigi Brunetti, Sante Santachiara, Tomaso Terrachii, Fortunato Galantini and Frumenzio Bernini. The faces of these founders were depicted on terracotta tiles by Giacinto Terrachini and placed on the pediment of the town hall.

In 1864, after the Italian unification process, the municipality took on the current name of Rio Saliceto, in order to distinguish it from other national territories with the word "Rio" in their names.

In 1889, the new neoclassical building of the town hall was inaugurated, and still stands. The liberty-style construction of the elementary school dates back to that period, later demolished in 1926 at the height of the Fascist regime, and then replaced with a building in the architectural style of the time.

Fighting unemployment and giving a better living and working conditions was the aim that helped the rise of the first cooperatives around the turn of the 20th century: Società Operaia di Mutuo Soccorso in 1881, L'Enologica in 1901, Birocciai and that of Miglioramento tra i lavoratori della terra in 1904.

The First World War led to 80 deaths on the battlefield because of injuries or illnesses contracted on the front.

The contribution provided by the citizens of Rio Saliceto during the Second World War and the Resistance was also substantial: 29 fallen in battle and missing in the war, 7 died in Nazi extermination camps where they were deported, and 21 partisans died for freedom. A monument composed of a bas-relief and a commemorative plaque with an inscription: "RIO SALICETO - who drove out the Nazi-Fascist monster - from these lands from these houses - from this bread from this blood - SWEAR - to the seven sons annihilated in the camps - to the twenty-one fallen fighting - for the certainty of the splendid April - to fight together as yesterday as always - for the monster never to come back," was placed on the facade of the town hall to celebrate the Resistance on 25 April 1972, the 30th anniversary of the Liberation.

== Twin towns ==
- (Italy) Garbagna Novarese, since 2024
- (Italy) Trino, since 2024
