= Province of Reggio Emilia =

Province of Italy

Coordinates: 44.5667°N 10.55°E

Province of Reggio Emilia Provincia di Reggio nell'Emilia (Italian) Pruvînsa ed Rèz (Emilian)
- Province
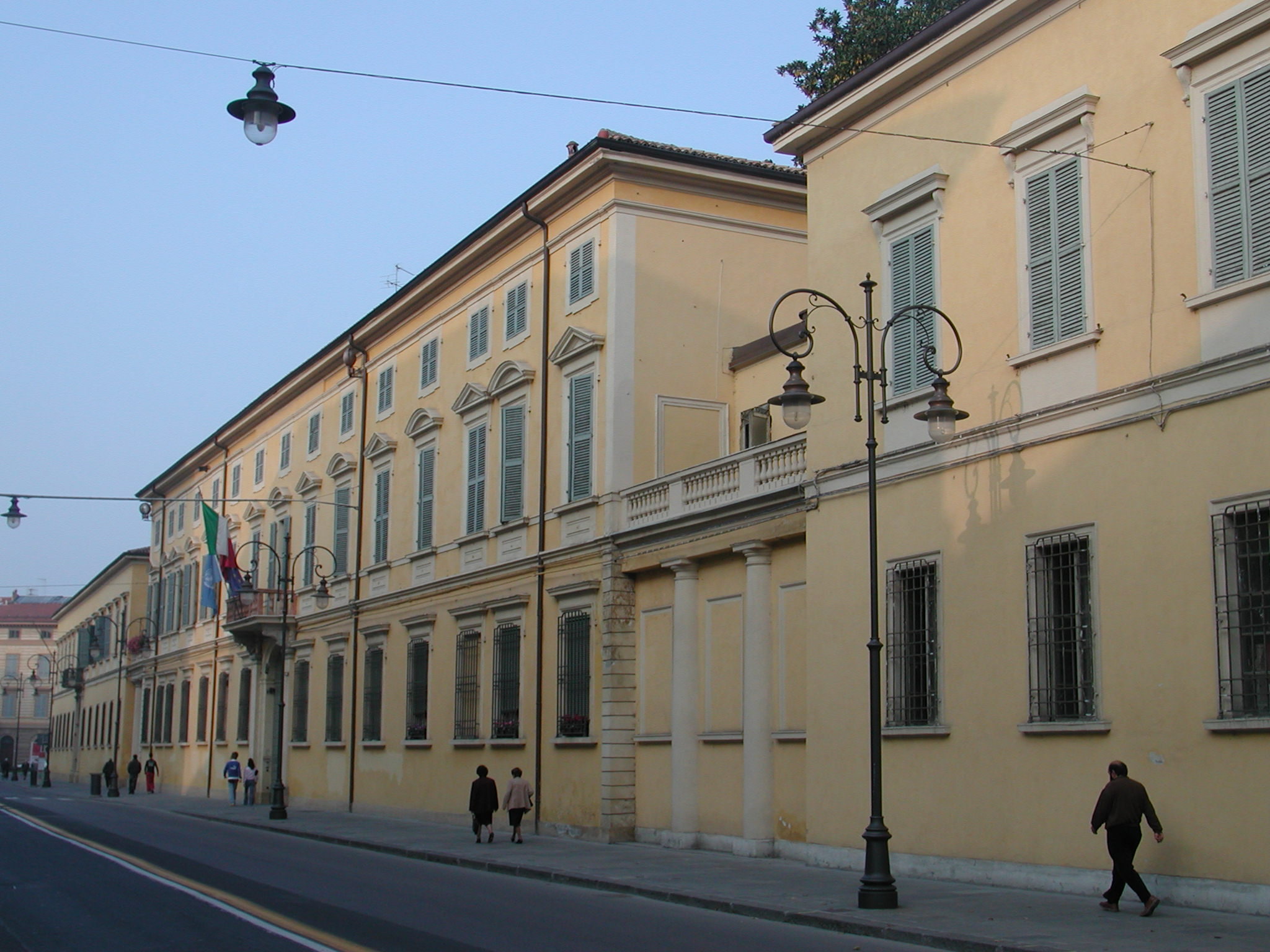
- Ducal Palace, the provincial seat

- Flag Coat of arms

- Location of the province of Reggio Emilia in Italy
- Country: Italy
- Region: Emilia-Romagna
- Capital(s): Reggio Emilia
- Municipalities: 42

Government
  - President: Giorgio Zanni (PD)

Area
  - Total: 2,291.26 km^{2} (884.66 sq mi)

Population (2026)
  - Total: 532,157
  - Density: 232.255/km^{2} (601.538/sq mi)

GDP
  - Total: €17.961 billion (2015)
  - Per capita: €33,694 (2015)
- Time zone: UTC+1 (CET)
  - Summer (DST): UTC+2 (CEST)
- Postal code: 42010-42025, 42028, 42030-42035, 42037, 42039-42049, 42121-42124
- Telephone prefix: 0522, 0536
- Vehicle registration: RE
- ISTAT code: 035

The province of Reggio Emilia (Italian: provincia di Reggio nell'Emilia; Emilian: pruvînsa ed Rèz) is a province in the region of Emilia-Romagna in Italy. The capital city is the eponymous Reggio Emilia. It has a population of 532,157 in an area of around 2,292 square kilometres (885 mi^{2}) across its 42 municipalities.

The province is home to the historical Canossa Castle, property of the countess Matilde; it is where the Walk to Canossa of Henry IV occurred. Representatives of the free municipalities of Reggio, Modena, Bologna and Ferrara met in Reggio Emilia's Sala del Tricolore in 1797 to proclaim the Repubblica Cispadana, adopting the three colour green-white-red flag to represent their newly formed Republic; it was later adopted in 1848 as the national flag.

== Municipalities ==
The province has 42 municipalities. Rolo, the smallest municipality in the province by area, is the municipality farthest to the East. Ventasso is the municipality farthest to the West. The border towns of the province are Ventasso, which is the smallest municipality by population, to the south and Luzzara in the north. Luzzara is the second largest municipality in Emilia-Romagna and has the highest number of foreign nationals in the region.

- Albinea
- Bagnolo in Piano
- Baiso
- Bibbiano
- Boretto
- Brescello
- Cadelbosco di Sopra
- Campagnola Emilia
- Campegine
- Canossa
- Carpineti
- Casalgrande
- Casina
- Castellarano
- Castelnovo di Sotto
- Castelnovo ne' Monti
- Cavriago
- Correggio
- Fabbrico
- Gattatico
- Gualtieri
- Guastalla
- Luzzara
- Montecchio Emilia
- Novellara
- Poviglio
- Quattro Castella
- Reggio nell'Emilia
- Reggiolo
- Rio Saliceto
- Rolo
- Rubiera
- San Martino in Rio
- San Polo d'Enza
- Sant'Ilario d'Enza
- Scandiano
- Toano
- Ventasso
- Vetto
- Vezzano sul Crostolo
- Viano
- Villa Minozzo

== Demographics ==
Historical population
Year	Pop.	±%
1861	234,135	—
1871	250,035	+6.8%
1881	253,486	+1.4%
1901	281,085	+10.9%
1911	318,658	+13.4%
1921	352,590	+10.6%
1931	370,109	+5.0%
1936	375,288	+1.4%
1951	390,131	+4.0%
1961	379,688	−2.7%
1971	392,696	+3.4%
1981	413,396	+5.3%
1991	420,431	+1.7%
2001	453,892	+8.0%
2011	517,316	+14.0%
2021	525,586	+1.6%
Source: ISTAT

As of 2026, the population is 532,157, of which 49.7% are male, and 50.3% are female. Minors make up 15.4% of the population, and seniors make up 23.3%.

=== Immigration ===
As of 2025, immigrants make up 16.0% of the population. The 5 largest foreign countries of birth are Morocco, Albania, India, Pakistan, and Ukraine.

== Education ==
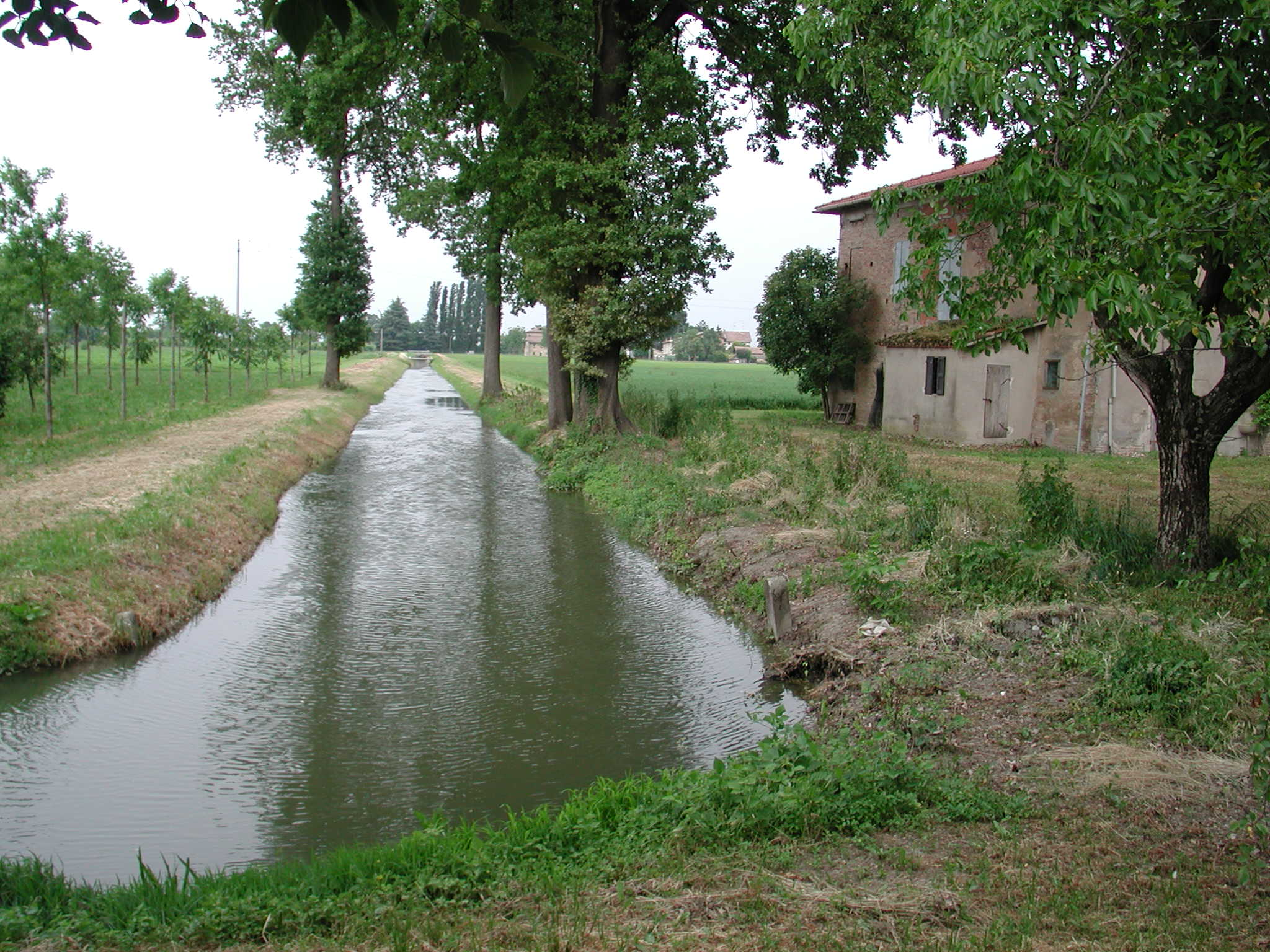
Typical Emilian countryside

Four faculties of the University of Modena and Reggio Emilia are located in Reggio Emilia. The Faculty of Engineering and Agriculture was established in Reggio Emilia in 1998, followed by the Faculties of Communication Sciences and of Education Sciences. It is home to the Orto Botanico dell'Università di Modena e Reggio Emilia.

The Reggio Emilia approach to preschool education was started by the schools of Reggio Emilia after World War II and it's known all over the world, being one of the most advanced systems at present times. It is based and inspired on theories of Malaguzzi, Bruner, Vygotsky, Dewey, Piaget and Gardner. Reggio Emilia holds the International Centre Loris Malaguzzi, a modern structure where the Reggio Emilia approach is implemented, exported and spread around the world.

== Sports ==
With sports arenas including the Stadio Giglio and PalaBigi, Reggio Emilia is home to the basketball team Pallacanestro Reggiana. The Camparini Gioielli Cup is a yearly challenger-level tennis tournament played on clay in Reggio Emilia. AC Reggiana 1919 is the historical soccer team of Reggio Emilia; it currently plays in the second national soccer league Serie B. Stadio Giglio (actual attendance is 29,650) is the home play ground for AC Reggiana 1919.

== See also ==
- AC Reggiana 1919
- Art collection of Fondazione Manodori
- Comunes of the province of Reggio Emilia
- PalaBigi
- Pallacanestro Reggiana
- Reggio Emilia approach
- Reggio Emilia chess tournament
- Stadio Giglio
- University of Modena and Reggio Emilia
