= Poviglio =

- Comune
- Comune di Poviglio
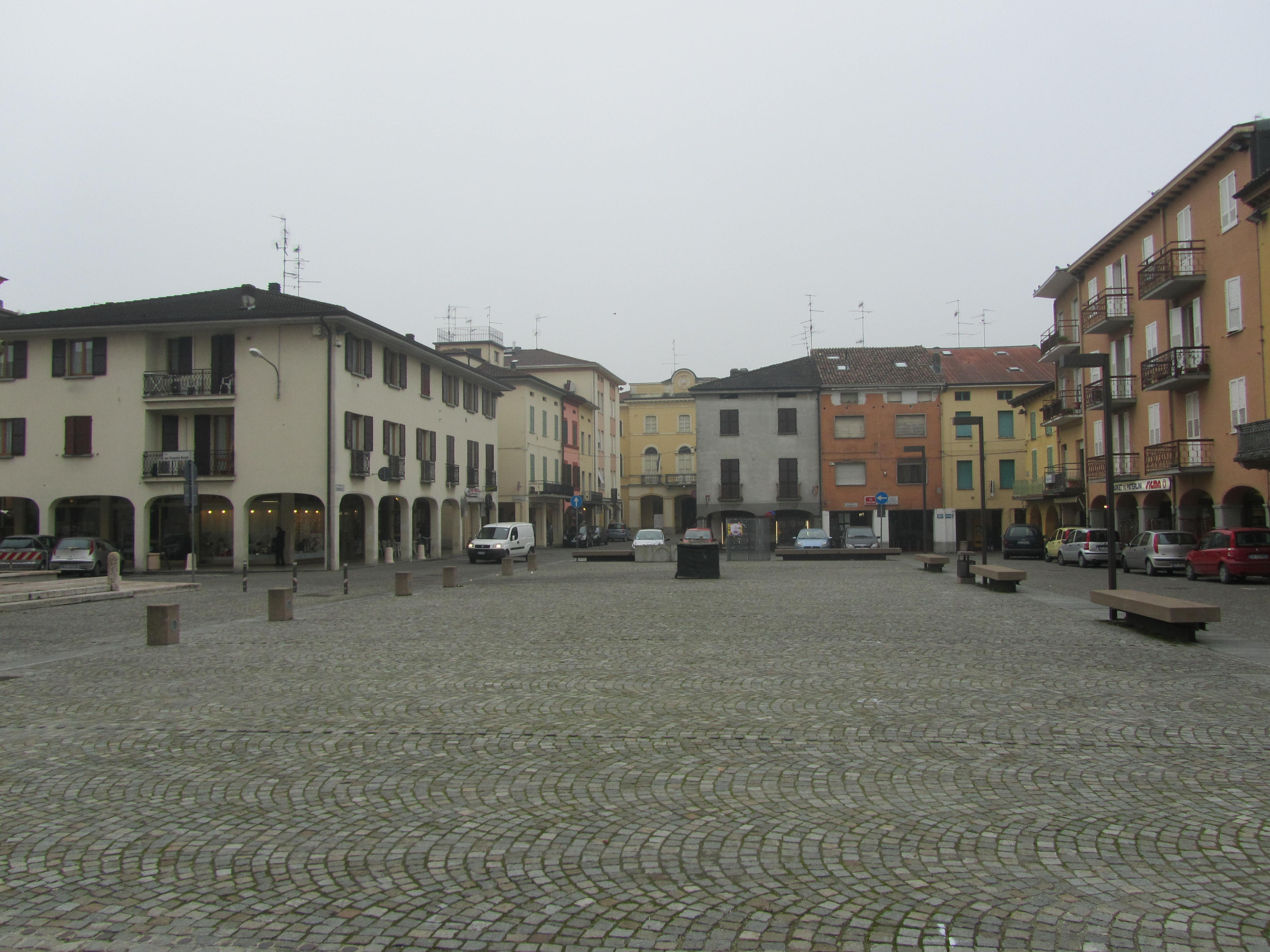
- View of Poviglio

- Location within Italy Location within Emilia-Romagna
- Coordinates: 44°50′N 10°33′E
- Country: Italy
- Region: Emilia-Romagna
- Province: Reggio Emilia (RE)
- Frazioni: Case Molinara, Case Motta, Case San Francesco, Case Via Piccola, Fodico, Godezza, Gruara, La Maestà, Oratorio Zamboni, Pontazzo, San Sisto, Enzola

Government
  - Mayor: Cristina Ferraroni

Area
  - Total: 43.55 km^{2} (16.81 sq mi)
- Elevation: 29 m (95 ft)

Population (31 March 2018)
  - Total: 7,297
  - Density: 167.6/km^{2} (434.0/sq mi)
- Demonym: Povigliesi
- Time zone: UTC+1 (CET)
  - Summer (DST): UTC+2 (CEST)
- Postal code: 42028
- Dialing code: 0522
- Website: Official website

Poviglio (Mantovano: Puii; Reggiano: Puvî) is a comune (municipality) in the Province of Reggio Emilia in the Italian region Emilia-Romagna, located about 70 kilometres (43 mi) northwest of Bologna and about 20 kilometres (12 mi) northwest of Reggio Emilia.

Poviglio borders the following municipalities: Boretto, Brescello, Castelnovo di Sotto, Gattatico.

== Twin towns ==
Poviglio is twinned with:

- Plédran, France
