= Vetto =

- Comune
- Comune di Vetto
- Location within Italy Location within Emilia-Romagna
- Coordinates: 44°29′N 10°20′E
- Country: Italy
- Region: Emilia-Romagna
- Province: Reggio Emilia (RE)
- Frazioni: Atticola, Brolo, Buvolo, Caiolla, Cantoniera, Casalecchio, Casella, Casone, Castellaro, Castellina, Cesola, Cola, Costa, Costaborga, Crovara, Ferma, Gottano Sopra, Gottano Sotto, Groppo, Legoreccio, Mavore, Maiola, Moziollo, Piagnolo, Pineto, Predella, Rodogno, Roncolo, Rosano, Scalucchia, Sole Sopra, Sole Sotto, Spigone, Strada, Teggia, Tizzolo, Vidiceto

Government
  - Mayor: Fabio Ruffini

Area
  - Total: 53.37 km^{2} (20.61 sq mi)
- Elevation: 447 m (1,467 ft)

Population (31 December 2017)
  - Total: 1,852
  - Density: 34.70/km^{2} (89.88/sq mi)
- Demonym: Vettesi
- Time zone: UTC+1 (CET)
  - Summer (DST): UTC+2 (CEST)
- Postal code: 42020
- Dialing code: 0522
- Patron saint: St. Lawrence
- Saint day: 10 August
- Website: Official website

Vetto (Reggiano: Vèt) is a comune (municipality) in the Province of Reggio Emilia in the Italian region Emilia-Romagna, located about 80 kilometres (50 mi) west of Bologna and about 35 kilometres (22 mi) southwest of Reggio Emilia.

Vetto borders the following municipalities: Castelnovo ne' Monti, Canossa, Neviano degli Arduini, Palanzano, Ventasso.
