= Toano, Reggio Emilia =

Toano
- Comune
- Comune di Toano
- Location within Italy Location within Emilia-Romagna
- Coordinates: 44°23′N 10°34′E
- Country: Italy
- Region: Emilia-Romagna
- Province: Reggio Emilia (RE)
- Frazioni: Bargio, Bonzeto, Ca'Baccano, Ca'Bagnoli, Ca'Casalotto, Ca'Cavalletti, Ca'del Re, Ca'di Guglio, Ca'Marangone, Ca'Marastoni, Carbalano, Case Bonci, Cassinadro, Castagnola, Castelvecchio, Cavola, Cerredolo, Comenzano, Corneto, Frale, Il Margine, La Ca', La Collina, La Crocetta, La Guarrana, La Valle, Le Lezze, Lignano, L'Oca, Lupazzo, Manno, Massa, Montebiotto, Montechiodo, Monzone, Poggiolo, Polcione, Ponte Dolo, Quara, Riale, Riva di Cavola, Roncaciso, Roncolo, Rondanello, Sabbione di Cerrè Marrabino, Salvarana, Stiano, Svolta, Trarì, Vecchieda-Le Buche, Vogno

Government
  - Mayor: Vincenzo Volpi

Area
  - Total: 67.25 km^{2} (25.97 sq mi)
- Elevation: 842 m (2,762 ft)

Population (31 December 2017)
  - Total: 4,433
  - Density: 65.92/km^{2} (170.7/sq mi)
- Demonym: Toanesi
- Time zone: UTC+1 (CET)
  - Summer (DST): UTC+2 (CEST)
- Postal code: 42010
- Dialing code: 0522

Toano (Reggiano: Toân; locally Tvân or Tuân) is a comune (municipality) in the Province of Reggio Emilia in the Italian region Emilia-Romagna, located about 60 kilometres (37 mi) west of Bologna and about 35 kilometres (22 mi) south of Reggio Emilia.

Toano borders the following municipalities: Baiso, Carpineti, Frassinoro, Montefiorino, Palagano, Prignano sulla Secchia, Villa Minozzo. It counts the hamlets (frazioni) of Cavola, Cerrè Marabino, Cerredolo, Frale, Massa di Toano and Quara.
