= Campegine =

- Comune
- Comune di Campegine
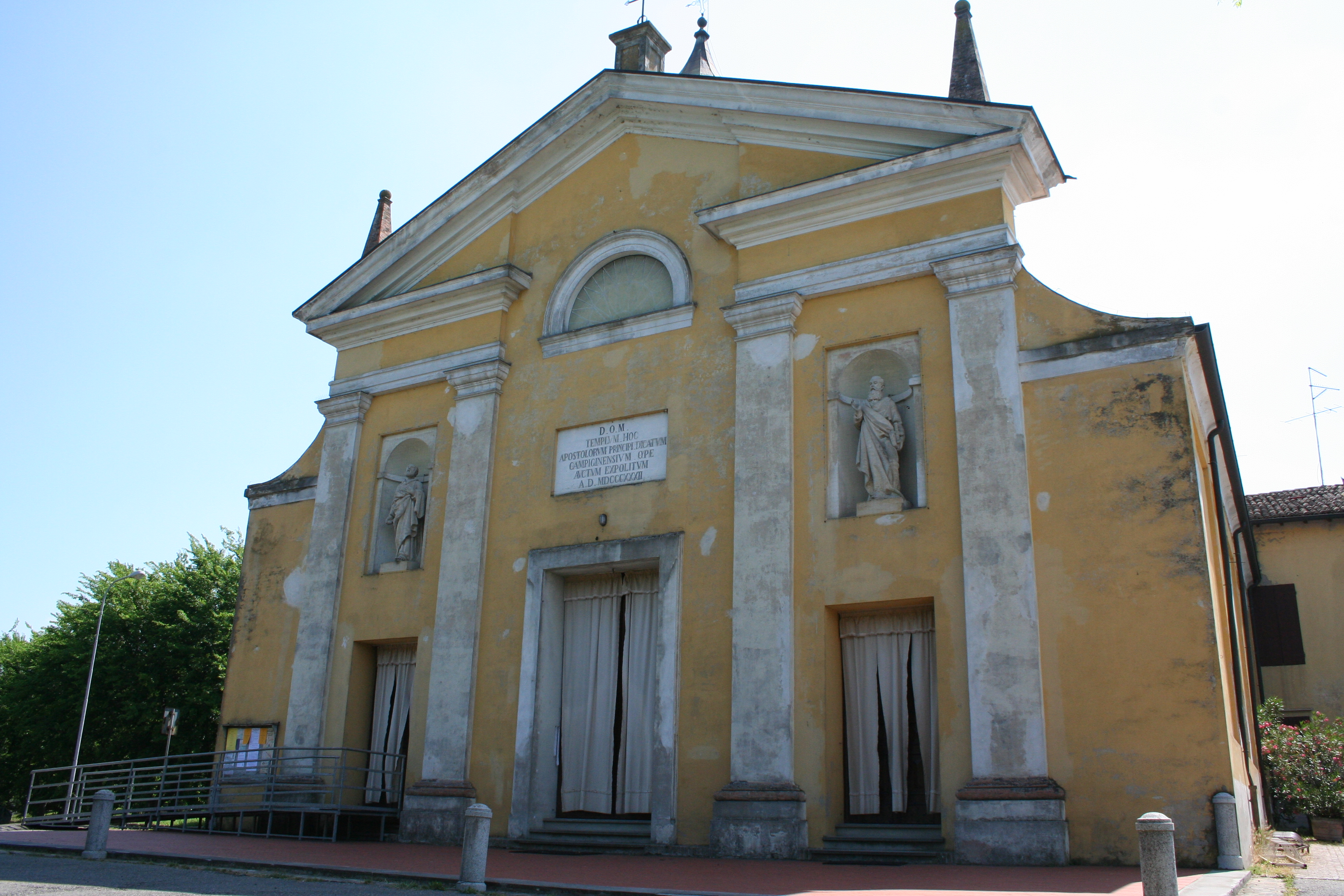
- Church in Campegine

- Location within Italy Location within Emilia-Romagna
- Coordinates: 44°47′N 10°31′E
- Country: Italy
- Region: Emilia-Romagna
- Province: Reggio Emilia (RE)
- Frazioni: Caprara, Case Cocconi, Case Lago, Casinetto-Tagliavino, La Razza, Lago, Lora, Massa

Government
  - Mayor: Giuseppe Germano Artioli

Area
  - Total: 22.62 km^{2} (8.73 sq mi)
- Elevation: 34 m (112 ft)

Population (1 January 2021)
  - Total: 5,292
  - Density: 234.0/km^{2} (605.9/sq mi)
- Demonym: Campeginese(i)
- Time zone: UTC+1 (CET)
  - Summer (DST): UTC+2 (CEST)
- Postal code: 42040
- Dialing code: 0522
- Patron saint: Saints Peter and Paul
- Saint day: 29 June
- Website: Official website

Campegine (Reggiano: Campéṣen) is a comune (municipality) in the Province of Reggio Emilia in the Italian region Emilia-Romagna, located about 70 kilometres (43 mi) northwest of Bologna and about 12 kilometres (7 mi) northwest of Reggio Emilia.

Campegine borders the following municipalities: Cadelbosco di Sopra, Castelnovo di Sotto, Gattatico, Reggio Emilia, Sant'Ilario d'Enza.

The Cervi Brothers were born in Campegine.

== Twin towns ==
- Montry, France, since 1979 to 1996
