= Casalgrande =

- Comune
- Comune di Casalgrande
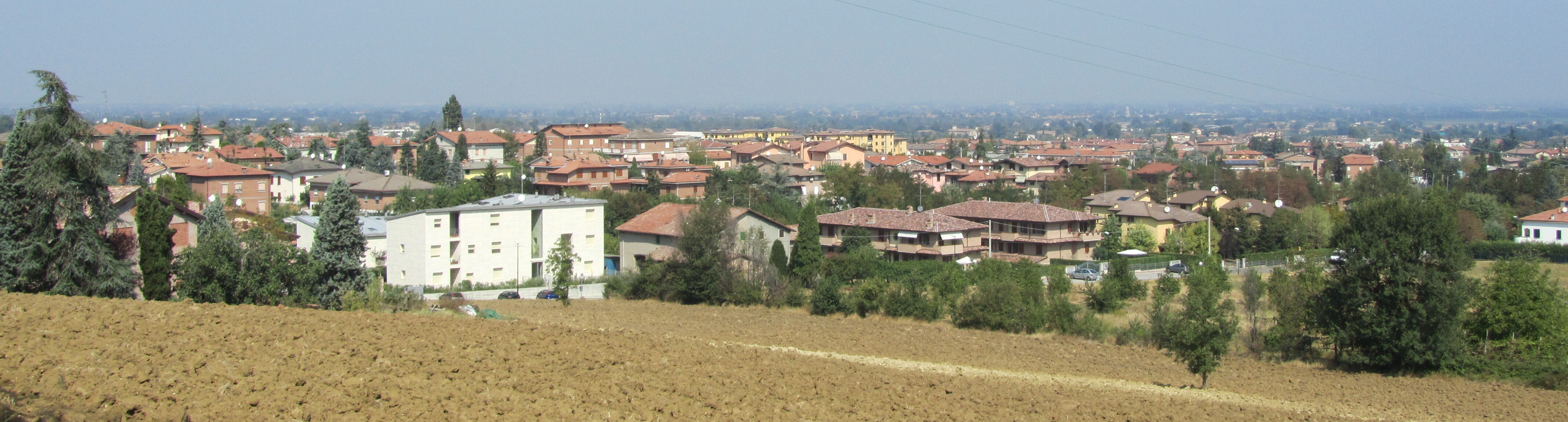
- View of Casalgrande

- Location within Italy Location within Emilia-Romagna
- Coordinates: 44°35′N 10°44′E
- Country: Italy
- Region: Emilia-Romagna
- Province: Province of Reggio Emilia (RE)
- Frazioni: Boglioni, Casalgrande Alto, Dinazzano, Salvaterra, San Donnino di Liguria, Sant'Antonino, Veggia, Villalunga

Government
  - Mayor: Alberto Vaccari

Area
  - Total: 37.7 km^{2} (14.6 sq mi)
- Elevation: 97 m (318 ft)

Population (31 December 2016)
  - Total: 19,215
  - Density: 510/km^{2} (1,320/sq mi)
- Demonym: Casalgrandesi
- Time zone: UTC+1 (CET)
  - Summer (DST): UTC+2 (CEST)
- Postal code: 42013
- Dialing code: 0522, 0536
- Website: Official website

Casalgrande (Reggiano: Càsalgrând) is a comune (municipality) in the Province of Reggio Emilia in the Italian region Emilia-Romagna, located about 50 kilometres (31 mi) west of Bologna and about 15 kilometres (9 mi) southeast of Reggio Emilia. As of 8 January 2017, it had a population of 19,215 and an area of 37.7 square kilometres (14.6 mi^{2}).

The municipality of Casalgrande contains the frazioni (subdivisions, mainly villages and hamlets) Boglioni, Casalgrande Alto, Dinazzano, Salvaterra, San Donnino di Liguria, Sant'Antonino, Veggia and Villalunga.

Casalgrande borders the following municipalities: Castellarano, Formigine, Modena, Reggio Emilia, Rubiera, Sassuolo, Scandiano.

== Demographic evolution ==
Historical population

Year	Pop.	±%
1861	3,931	—
1871	4,185	+6.5%
1881	4,055	−3.1%
1901	5,096	+25.7%
1911	5,813	+14.1%

Year	Pop.	±%
1921	6,806	+17.1%
1931	7,637	+12.2%
1936	7,601	−0.5%
1951	8,148	+7.2%
1961	8,339	+2.3%

Year	Pop.	±%
1971	11,551	+38.5%
1981	13,382	+15.9%
1991	13,269	−0.8%
2001	14,226	+7.2%

Source: Data from ISTAT
