= Brescello =

Brescello Barsèl (Emilian)
- Comune
- Comune di Brescello
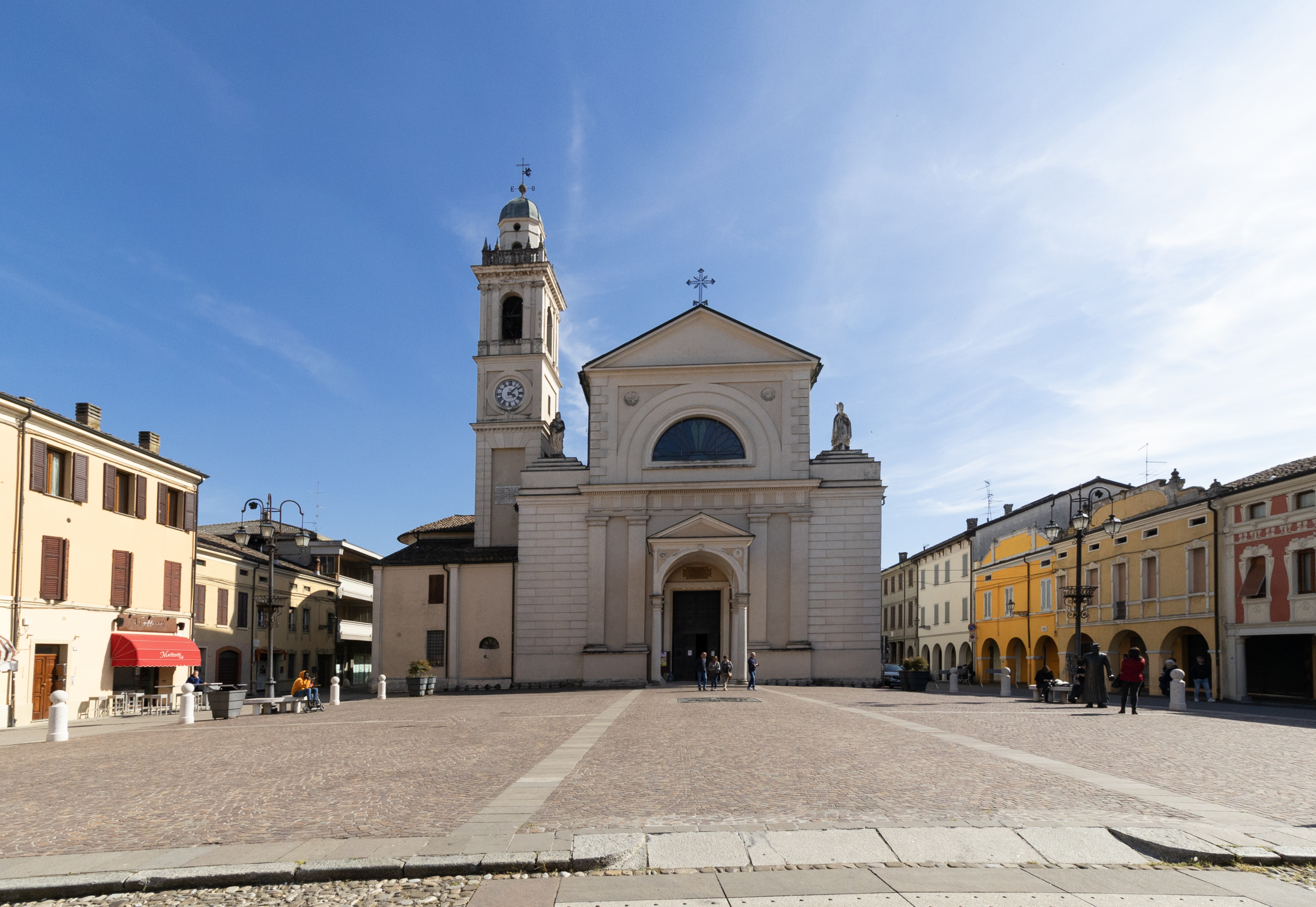
- The central Piazza Matteotti

- Coat of arms

- Location within Italy Location within Emilia-Romagna
- Coordinates: 44°54′N 10°31′E
- Country: Italy
- Region: Emilia-Romagna
- Province: Reggio Emilia (RE)
- Frazioni: Coenzo a Mane, Ghiarole, Lentigione, Sorbolo a Mane

Government
  - Mayor: Carlo Fiumicino (PD)

Area
  - Total: 24.04 km^{2} (9.28 sq mi)
- Elevation: 24 m (79 ft)

Population (2025)
  - Total: 5,576
  - Density: 231.9/km^{2} (600.7/sq mi)
- Demonym: Brescellesi
- Time zone: UTC+1 (CET)
  - Summer (DST): UTC+2 (CEST)
- Postal code: 42041
- Dialing code: 0522
- Website: Official website

Brescello (Italian: [breʃˈʃɛllo]; Barsèl [bɐrˈsɛl] in the local dialect, Bersèl in the Reggio Emilia dialect) is a comune (municipality) in the Province of Reggio Emilia in the Italian region Emilia-Romagna, located about 80 kilometres (50 mi) northwest of Bologna and about 25 kilometres (16 mi) northwest of Reggio Emilia.

== Geography ==
Situated in the northwestern side of the province, close to the borders with the provinces of Parma and Mantua (Mantua is in Lombardy), Brescello lies on the southern shore of the river Po, near the confluence with the Enza. The municipality borders Boretto, Gattatico, Mezzani, Poviglio, Sorbolo and Viadana. It counts the hamlets (frazioni) of Ghiarole, Lentigione and Sorbolo a Levante.

== History ==
Located near the Po river, remains of this ancient town's Roman roots – it was called Brixellum or Brixillum during the Roman era – can still be seen in the Antiquarium, via Cavallotti 12 (a former Benedictine monastery), where ancient Roman relics and sculptures are on display. A bishop Cyprianus of Brixillum was present at a synod held in Milan in 451, but the bishopric came to an end when in the early 7th century the Byzantines destroyed the town to prevent it falling into the hands of the Lombard king Agilulf. No longer a residential bishopric, Brixillum is now listed by the Catholic Church as a titular see.

Today, the town is most famous for being the set for the film series of Peppone and Don Camillo, played by Gino Cervi and Fernandel and based on the books by Giovannino Guareschi. Brescello has dedicated a museum to these two characters, which houses many props, including a tank which was used in a scene from Don Camillo e l'onorevole Peppone ("Don Camillo's Last Round").

== Main sights ==
=== Church of Santa Maria Nascente ===
The current church was rebuilt between 1829 and 1837 replacing the ancient medieval church that once stood here. Inside it has a nave and two aisles with six side altars, three on each side, with large archways that divide the nave from the aisles, and an impressive wooden crucifix by Bruno Avesani. On the side of the main altar, there is a plaster statue of Padre Pio made by the local sculptor Carlo Pisi, and in the curvature of the apse, there is the chorus seating made from inlaid wood, with a large painting by Carlo Zatti above it. The original altar is now located in the central chapel in the left aisle. Near it is the wooden, carved, gold-leaf central pulpit. The facade, dominated by the 1896 bell tower, has two statues, one of the Virgin and one of the patron Saint Genesius, both by Innocente Franceschini, and placed on the facade in 1899. The bell tower has five bells.

On the night of 5 April 2010, a fire destroyed a modern altar and damaged some furniture.

=== Former monastery of San Benedetto ===
This Benedictine monastery was built in the 15th century for the secluded monks of the Saint Benedict order, who remained there until the beginning of the Cisalpine Republic. Completely renovated, it is now home to a Cultural Center which houses the Museum of Peppone and Don Camillo, a day care, the library, the Municipal Council, the Auser Center and the Municipal Police.

=== Parco Giovannino Guareschi ===
Adjacent to the Museum, is a park where the remaining part of the original church of the old cloister of the Benedictine monks can be seen. In the center of the park there is the bust of Giovannino Guareschi, inaugurated in 1995.

== Municipal government ==
Brescello is headed by a mayor (sindaco) assisted by a legislative body, the consiglio comunale, and an executive body, the giunta comunale. Since 1995 the mayor and members of the consiglio comunale are directly elected together by resident citizens, while from 1945 to 1995 the mayor was chosen by the legislative body. The giunta comunale is chaired by the mayor, who appoints others members, called assessori. The offices of the comune are housed in a building usually called the municipio or palazzo comunale.

Since 1995 the mayor of Brescello is directly elected by citizens, originally every four, then every five years. The current mayor is Carlo Fiumicino (PD), elected on 15 May 2023.

Mayor	Term start	Term end	Party
Innocente Arontaldi	1945	1947	PCI
Leda Palazzi Bacchi	1947	1951	PCI
Afro Bettati	1951	1970	PSI
Volmer Bonini	1970	1985	PCI
Ermes Coffrini	1985	1995	PCI
Directly-elected mayors (since 1995)
Ermes Coffrini	1995	2004	PDS; DS
Giuseppe Vezzani	2004	2014	DS; PD
Marcello Coffrini	2014	2016 (Note: Resigned.)	PD
Special Commission's tenure (2016–2018)
Elena Benassi	2018	2023	PD
Carlo Fiumicino	2023	Incumbent	PD

== People ==
- Antonio Panizzi, patriot, librarian and bibliographer
- Mario Nizolio, philosopher and scholar

== Events ==
=== Brescello Film Festival ===
Begun in 2003, the festival is dedicated to documentaries and works of fiction that focus on Italy: its places, environment, traditions, values and culture. The event is promoted by the Municipality of Brescello together with the Pro Loco Association and the Videoclub of Brescello, with the patronage of the Minister of Foreign Affairs and the Minister of Cultural Activities and Heritage.

=== La Notte dell'Imperatore - Brixellum Romanorum – Historical Reenactment ===
This two-day event, taking place in June every other year, is an historical reenactment organised by the local archeological society. The event is organised to celebrate and remember the events which connect the village to the Roman emperor Otho (who committed suicide there). During the event it is possible to experience how life in Ancient Rome was thanks to the many workshops, the ludi, the traditional market on the main square and the traditional dinner taking place during the evening.

== Gallery ==
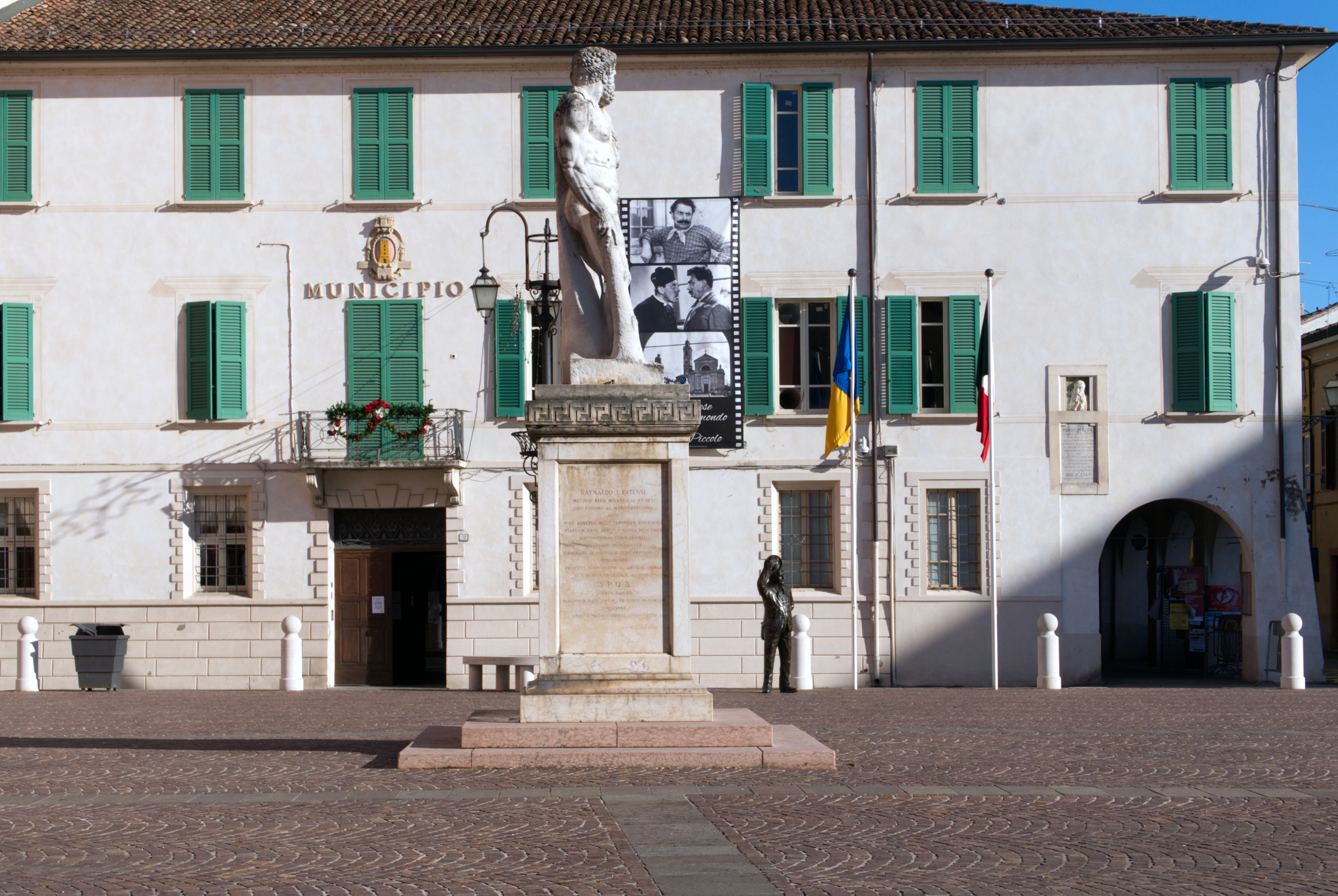
Town Hall

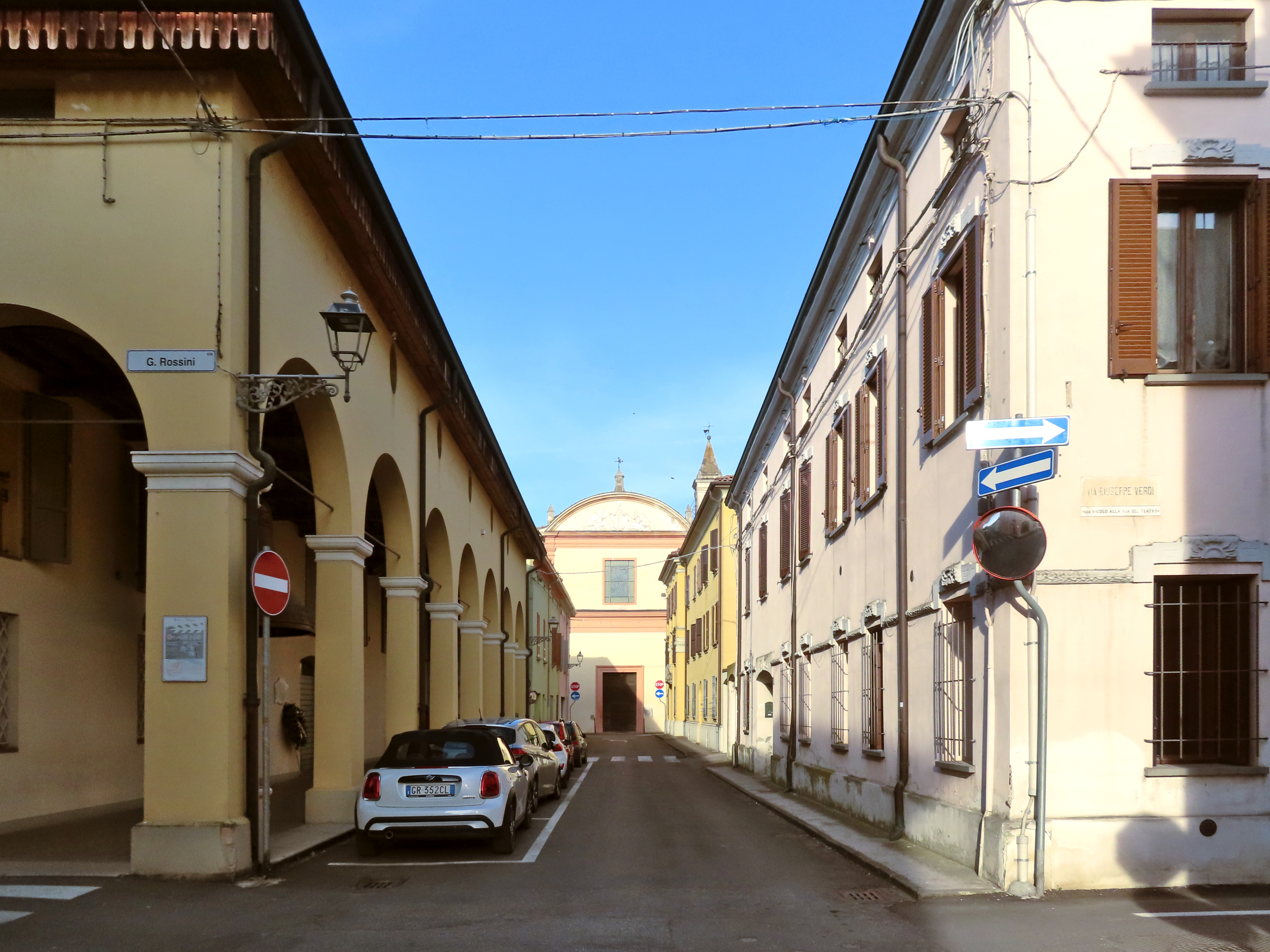
City centre

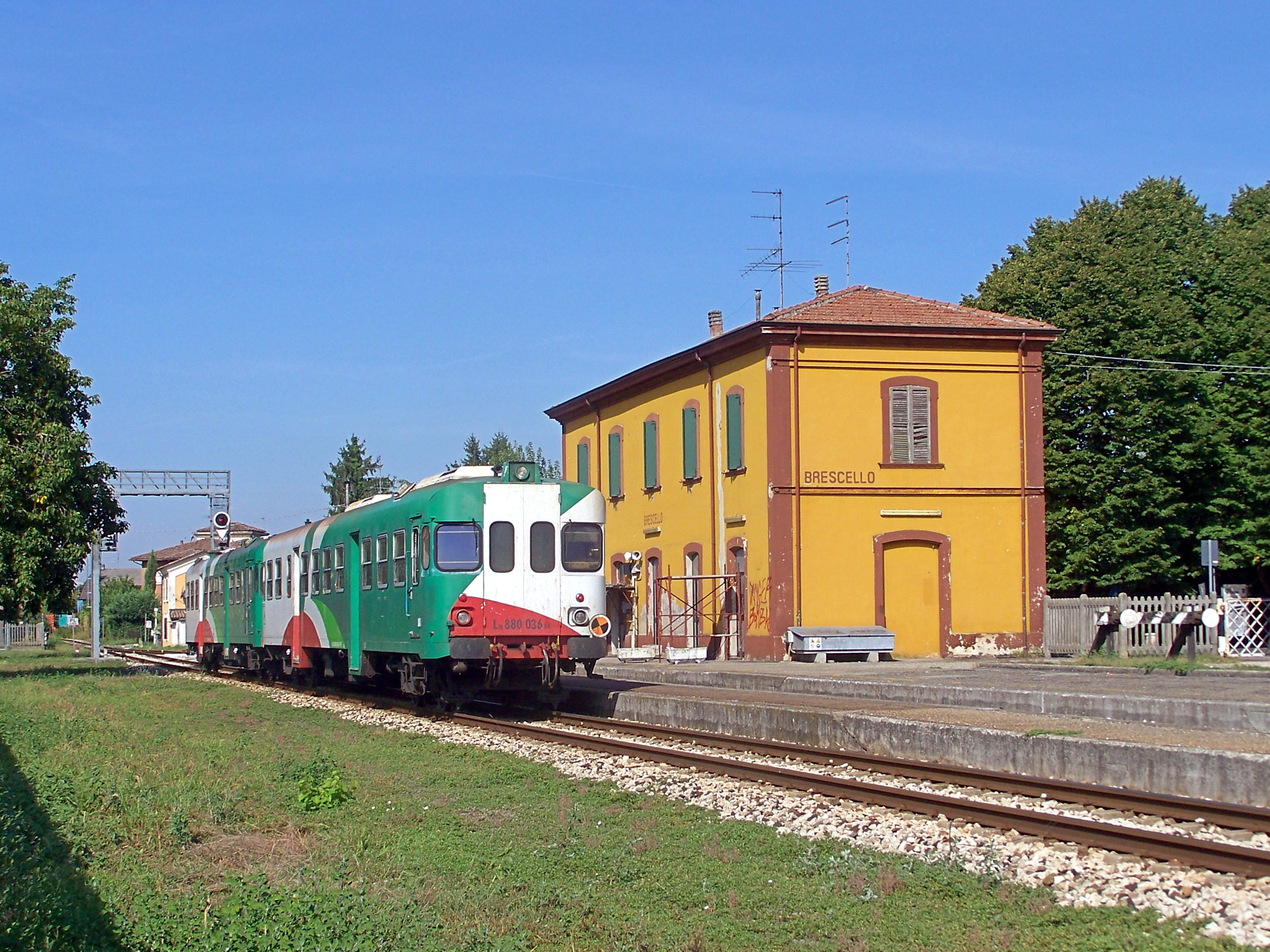
Train station

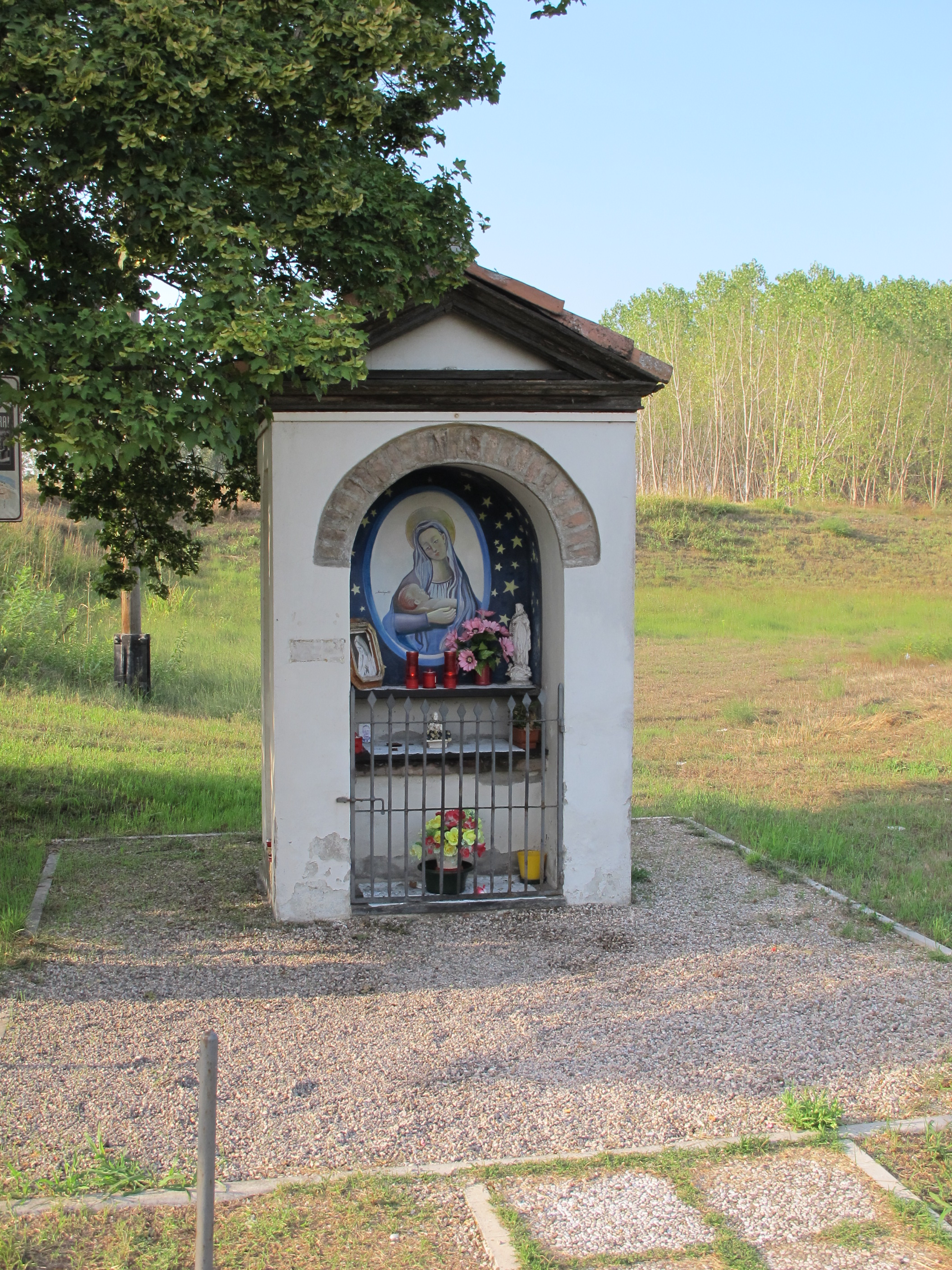
Madonnina del Borghetto

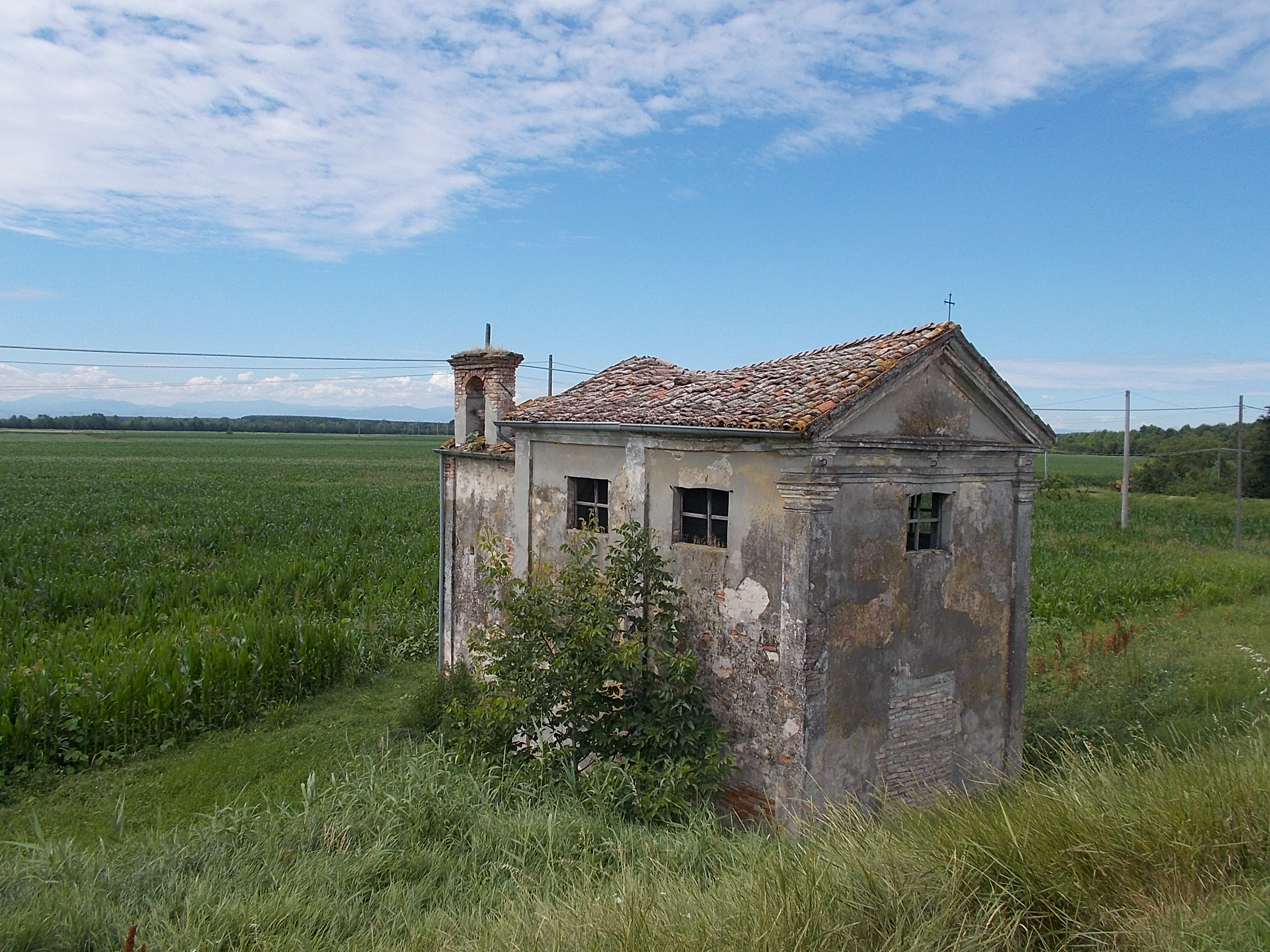
Sant'Anna church
