= Gattatico =

- Comune
- Comune di Gattatico
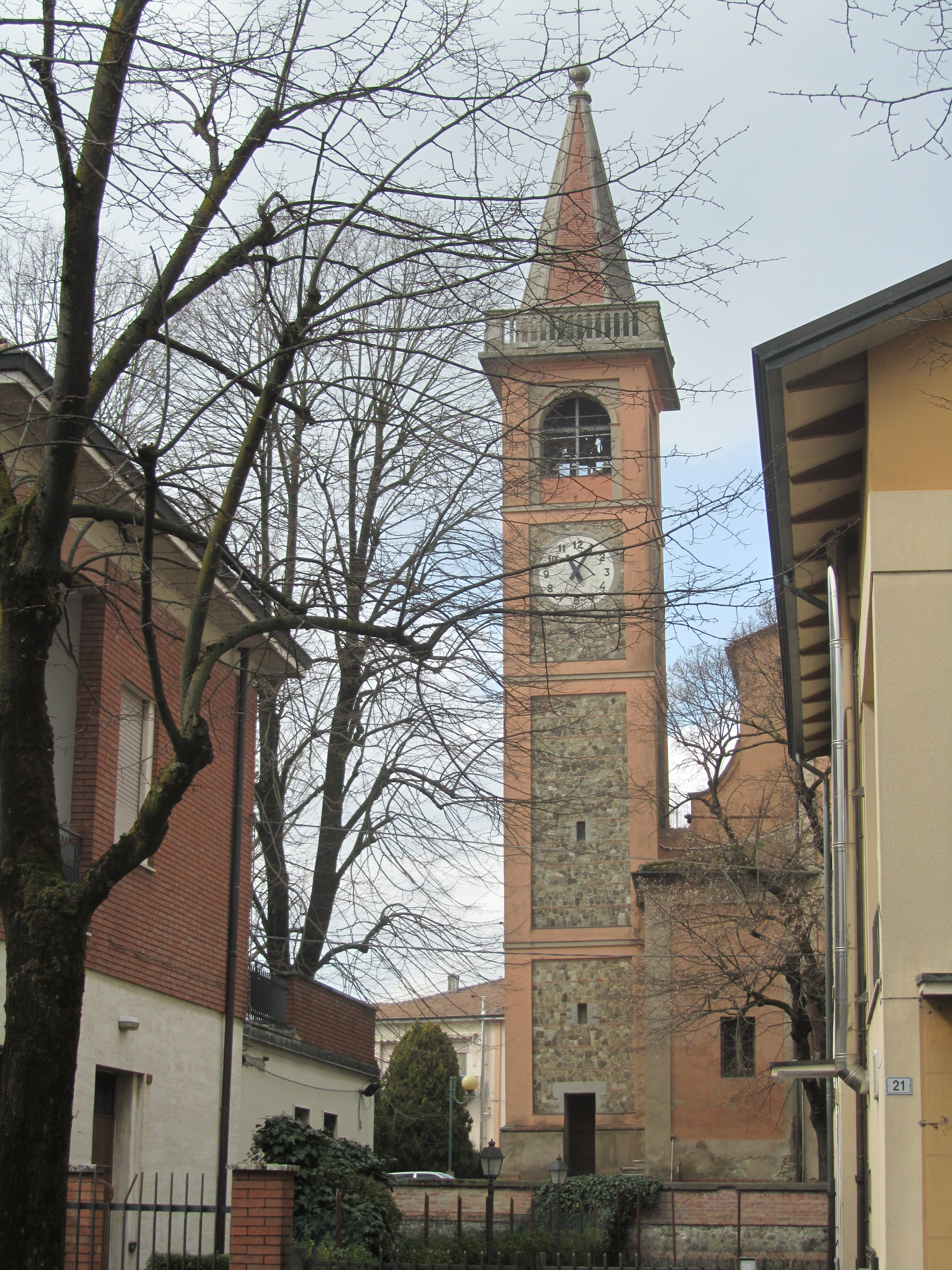
- View of Gattatico

- Location within Italy Location within Emilia-Romagna
- Coordinates: 44°48′N 10°28′E
- Country: Italy
- Region: Emilia-Romagna
- Province: Reggio Emilia (RE)
- Frazioni: Cantone, Case Ponte Enza, Case Reverberi, Nocetolo, Olmo, Paulli, Praticello, Taneto

Government
  - Mayor: Luca Ronzoni

Area
  - Total: 42.4 km^{2} (16.4 sq mi)
- Elevation: 40 m (130 ft)

Population (28 February 2023)
  - Total: 5,668
  - Density: 134/km^{2} (346/sq mi)
- Demonym: Gattaticesi
- Time zone: UTC+1 (CET)
  - Summer (DST): UTC+2 (CEST)
- Postal code: 42043
- Dialing code: 0522
- Website: Official website

Gattatico (Reggiano: Gatâtich, Gâtadegh or Gadàdegh) is a comune (municipality) in the Province of Reggio Emilia in the Italian region Emilia-Romagna.

As of 28 February 2023 the comune had a population of 5,668.

== Geography ==
The municipality is located about 80 kilometres (50 mi) west of Bologna and about 20 kilometres (12 mi) northwest of Reggio Emilia. Gattatico borders the following municipalities: Brescello, Campegine, Castelnovo di Sotto, Parma, Poviglio, Sant'Ilario d'Enza, Sorbolo.

=== Climate ===
The municipality has a humid subtropical climate (Köppen classification Cfa). Summers are hot and humid, with average high temperatures of 29–30 °C (84–86 °F) that occasionally exceed 35 °C (95 °F). Spring and autumn are generally pleasant seasons, although they often experience widespread rainfall. Winters are cold, with moderate snowfall and average high temperatures of 4–5 °C (39–41 °F) that frequently drop below freezing at night. The occasional severe thunderstorms in the area can produce intense hailstorms.

== History ==
The first colonization of the area, once covered by forests, was carried out by the Cenomani, who built the fortress of Taneto. Archaeological traces of early settlements has been found, including burials, ceramics, flint, and worked bones.

During the Roman era, starting from the 2nd century BC, the area was reclaimed and divided according to the centuriation system, traces of which can be seen in the Nocetolo area. For example, the current Via Zappellazzo overlaps with the route of the ancient Via Tabularia, an important road for connecting the villages along the Po River with the Reggio Emilia hills. The origin of the toponym "Gattatico" is uncertain but it could derive from "captato" (prisoner), referring to the use of prisoners in land reclamation works.

After the fall of the Western Roman Empire, the territory came under the control of the Byzantines. Later, in the year 568, when the Lombards, led by King Alboin, spread throughout the Po Valley, they encountered little resistance in the cities and conquered extensive territories. Gattatico then belonged to the Carolingians and, from 895 to 1060, to the bishops of Parma.

During the medieval period, Gattatico was under the control of various lordships from Parma and from the mid-16th century onwards, it came under the rule of the House of Farnese, governors of the Duchy of Parma and Piacenza. After the Habsburg and Bourbon succession wars, the late 18th century witnessed the strong advance of Napoleon Bonaparte in Italian territory. The armistice of 1796 with Duke Ferdinand of Bourbon marked the beginning of French protection over the duchy, and in 1801, Napoleon obtained Spain's approval for the annexation of the duchy to France. The territory was initially administered by General Governor Moreau de Saint-Méry and later by Prefect Hugues Nardon and it was subjected to the new French Civil Code issued by Napoleon. The duchy was divided into thirteen communities (mairies), and among them, the Gattatico Community was established, with Captain Luigi Nalli being appointed as the first mayor (maire) on March 25, 1806.

Annexed in 1811 to the Napoleonic Department of Crostolo, Gattatico returned to the Duchy of Parma and Piacenza in 1816 as a result of the Restoration of the Congress of Vienna. Finally, in 1848, it came under the rule of the Duchy of Modena and Reggio once again, under the dominion of the House of Este with Archduke Francis V. After the Second Italian War of Independence, Gattatico was reconstituted as an autonomous municipality by a dictatorial decree of Carlo Luigi Farini. Subsequently, in March 1860, Mayor Antonio Fortunato Nazzari organized a vote to decide on annexation to the Kingdom of Sardinia. On March 19, 1861, after the unification of a large part of the peninsula, the Kingdom of Italy was proclaimed under King Vittorio Emanuele II. In 1870, the municipal seat was transferred to the hamlet of Praticello, located in the center of the municipal territory.

Between the late 19th century and the early 20th century, two figures of social reformers emerged in Gattatico. The first was the liberal deputy Ulisse Carmi, who dedicated himself to humanitarian works and founded a people's bank and a mutual aid society. The second was Amos Tragni, a professor and student of Giosuè Carducci, who advocated socialist ideas and founded cooperatives and the popular library.

During the course of World War I, Gattatico mourned the loss of 86 young citizens who fell victim to enemy fire. In the political and social turmoil that followed on a national level, the Fascist party came to power, and at the municipal level, the imprint of the new regime was represented by the figure of the Podestà. During the five years of the Second World War and the Resistance against Nazi-Fascism, Gattatico paid a heavy price with the deaths of 52 soldiers and dozens of other civilian victims. The post-war period witnessed a decline in the area, rural exodus, and the difficult coexistence among the different hamlets of the territory. The Italian economic miracle of the late 1950s brought new industrial and artisanal settlements, initiating a slow process of transformation in the local economy.

== Twin towns ==
Gattatico is twinned with:

- Melissa, Calabria, Italy
- Zierenberg, Germany

== Sources ==
- Elpidio Mori, Storia e cronaca di Gattatico, Tip. Editrice La Nazionale, Parma, 1972
- Livio Bertozzi, Giulio Salvetat, Gattatico – Comune oltre il torrente Enza, 2012
- Mario Cantarelli, Umberto Spaggiari, Gattatico – Uno sguardo nel tempo, 2007
- Andrea Chiari, Guido Burani, Pace belloque in pace e in guerra, Città Editrice, 2002
- L’Emilia Romagna paese per paese, volume III, Casa Editrice Bonechi, 1987
