= Reggiolo =

- Comune
- Comune di Reggiolo
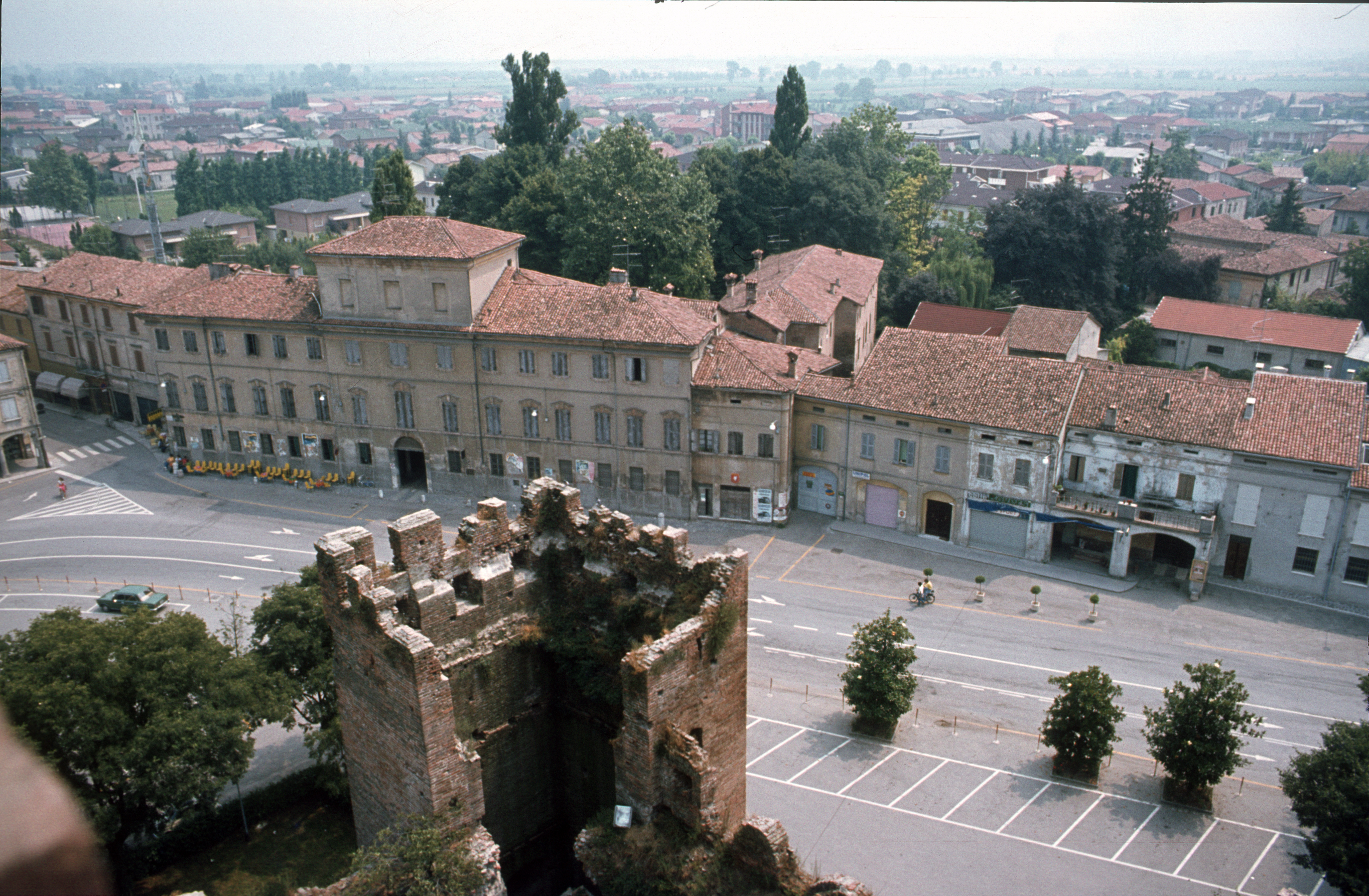
- View of Reggiolo

- Location within Italy Location within Emilia-Romagna
- Coordinates: 44°55′N 10°49′E
- Country: Italy
- Region: Emilia-Romagna
- Province: Reggio Emilia (RE)
- Frazioni: Brugneto, Villanova

Area
  - Total: 43.01 km^{2} (16.61 sq mi)
- Elevation: 20 m (66 ft)

Population (31 December 2016)
  - Total: 9,192
  - Density: 213.7/km^{2} (553.5/sq mi)
- Demonym: Reggiolesi
- Time zone: UTC+1 (CET)
  - Summer (DST): UTC+2 (CEST)
- Postal code: 42046
- Dialing code: 0522
- ISTAT code: 035032
- Patron saint: San Venerio
- Saint day: 7 July
- Website: Official website

Reggiolo is a comune (municipality) in the province of Reggio Emilia, in the Italian region of Emilia-Romagna. As of 31 December 2016, Reggiolo had an estimated population of 9,192. Carlo Ancelotti, the famous football manager, is a native of the town, and Formula One racer Lorenzo Bandini's funeral was held here.

== Twin towns ==
Reggiolo is twinned with:

- Niardo, Italy, since 2012
