= Viano, Reggio Emilia =

Viano
- Comune
- Comune di Viano
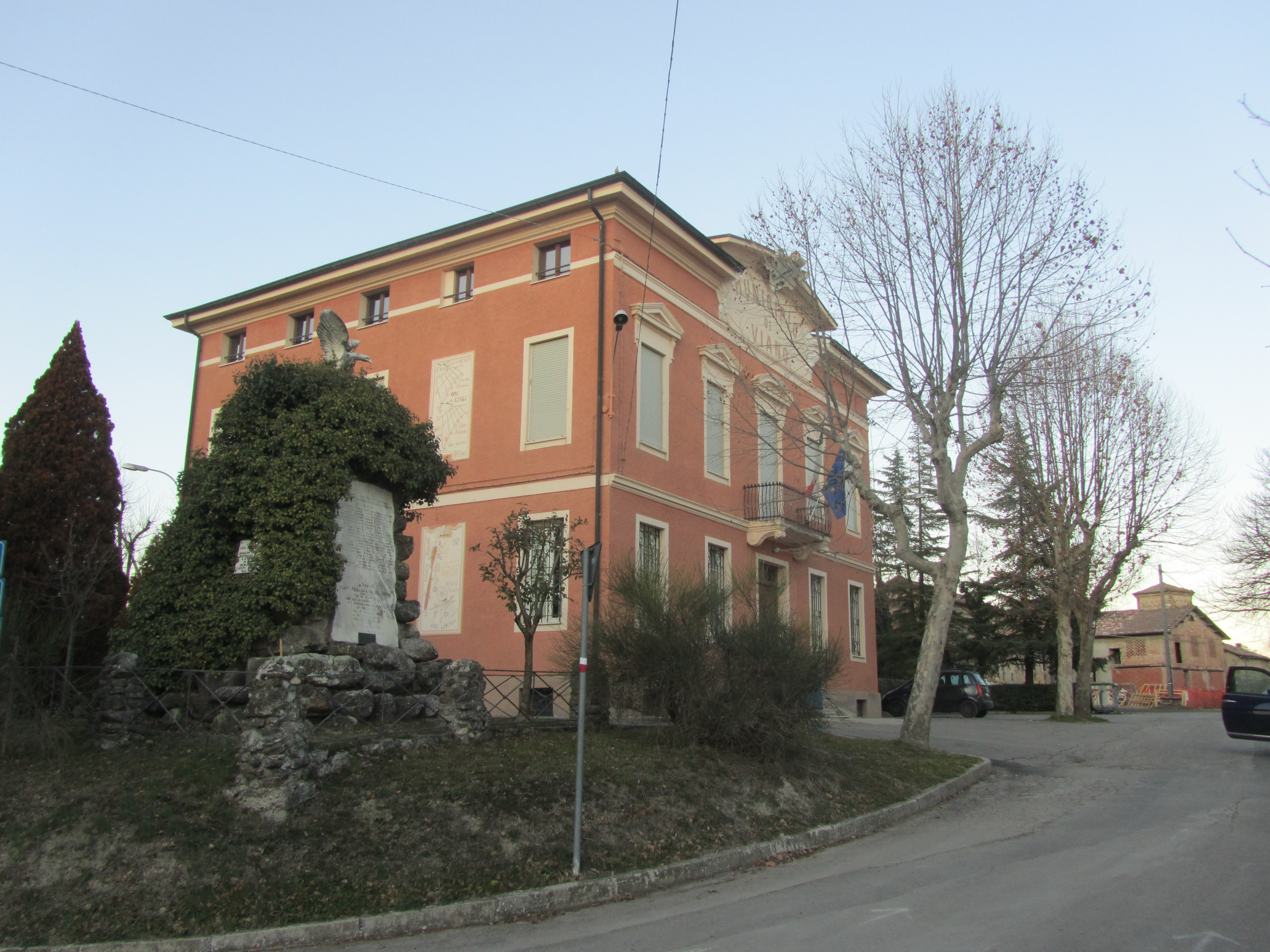
- Town hall

- Location within Italy Location within Emilia-Romagna
- Coordinates: 44°34′N 10°35′E
- Country: Italy
- Region: Emilia-Romagna
- Province: Reggio Emilia (RE)

Area
  - Total: 45 km^{2} (17 sq mi)
- Elevation: 275 m (902 ft)

Population (31 December 2016)
  - Total: 3,356
  - Density: 75/km^{2} (190/sq mi)
- Demonym: Vianesi
- Time zone: UTC+1 (CET)
  - Summer (DST): UTC+2 (CEST)
- Postal code: 42030
- Dialing code: 0522
- Patron saint: San Salvatore
- Website: Official website

Viano (Reggiano: Viân [vjaːŋ]) is a town and comune in the province of Reggio Emilia, in the Emilia-Romagna region of central Italy.
