= Romanoro =

- Frazione
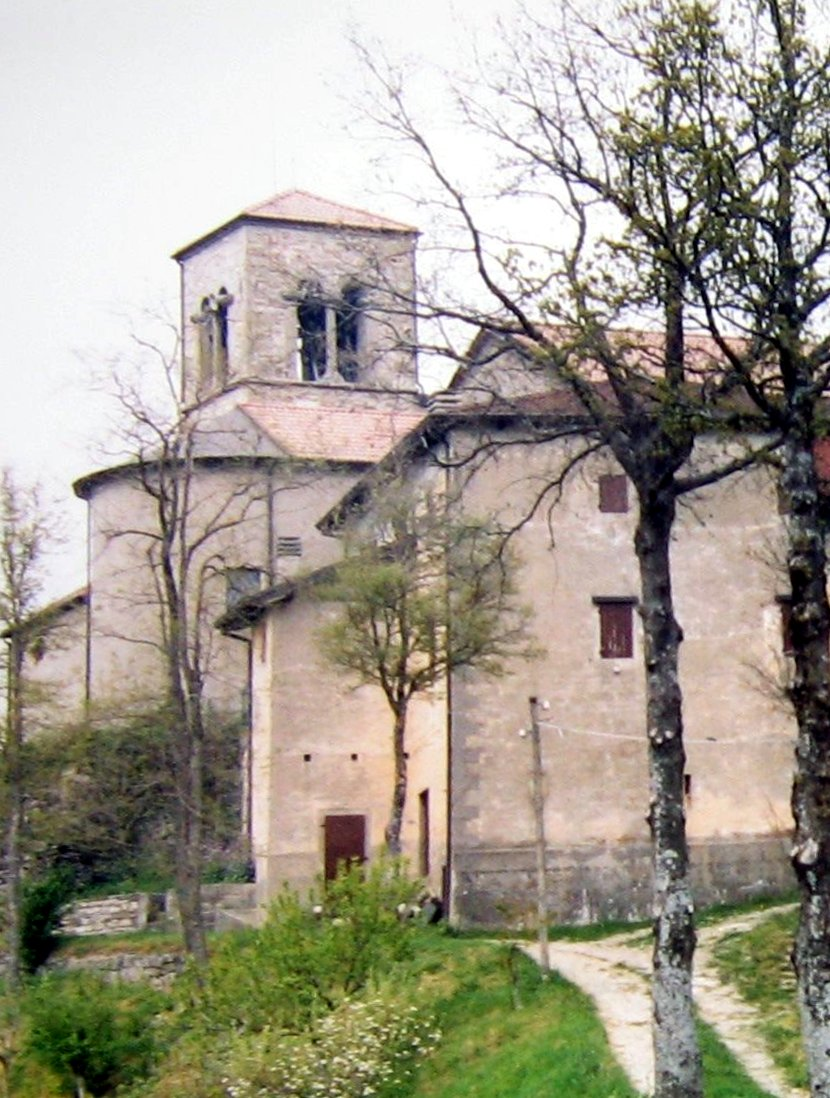
- Romanoro church and its presbytery, dating back to the late 19th century.

- Location of Romanoro in Italy
- Coordinates: 44°18′38″N 10°31′26″E
- Country: Italy
- Region: Emilia-Romagna
- Province: Modena (MO)
- Comune: Frassinoro

Area
  - Total: 14 km^{2} (5.4 sq mi)
- Elevation: 700 m (2,300 ft)

Population (2001)
  - Total: 54
  - Density: 3.9/km^{2} (10/sq mi)
- Demonym: Romanoresi
- Time zone: UTC+1 (CET)
  - Summer (DST): UTC+2 (CEST)
- Postal code: 41040
- Dialing code: 0536
- Patron saint: Scholastica, Benedict of Nursia
- Website: Official website

Romanoro is a small hamlet in the province of Modena in central Italy, administratively a frazione of Frassinoro. It is about 700 metres (2,300 ft) above sea level.

Right below the town flows the Dolo mountain stream. A dam exists at the top of Fontanaluccia, that deviates part of the water about 16 km (9.9 mi) downward to the hydroelectric power plant located in the nearby Farneta.

== History ==
Construction of a bridge over the Valoria landslide (44°19′22″N 10°32′11″E) had been planned since 2006. The bridge was completed in 2007.

== Images ==
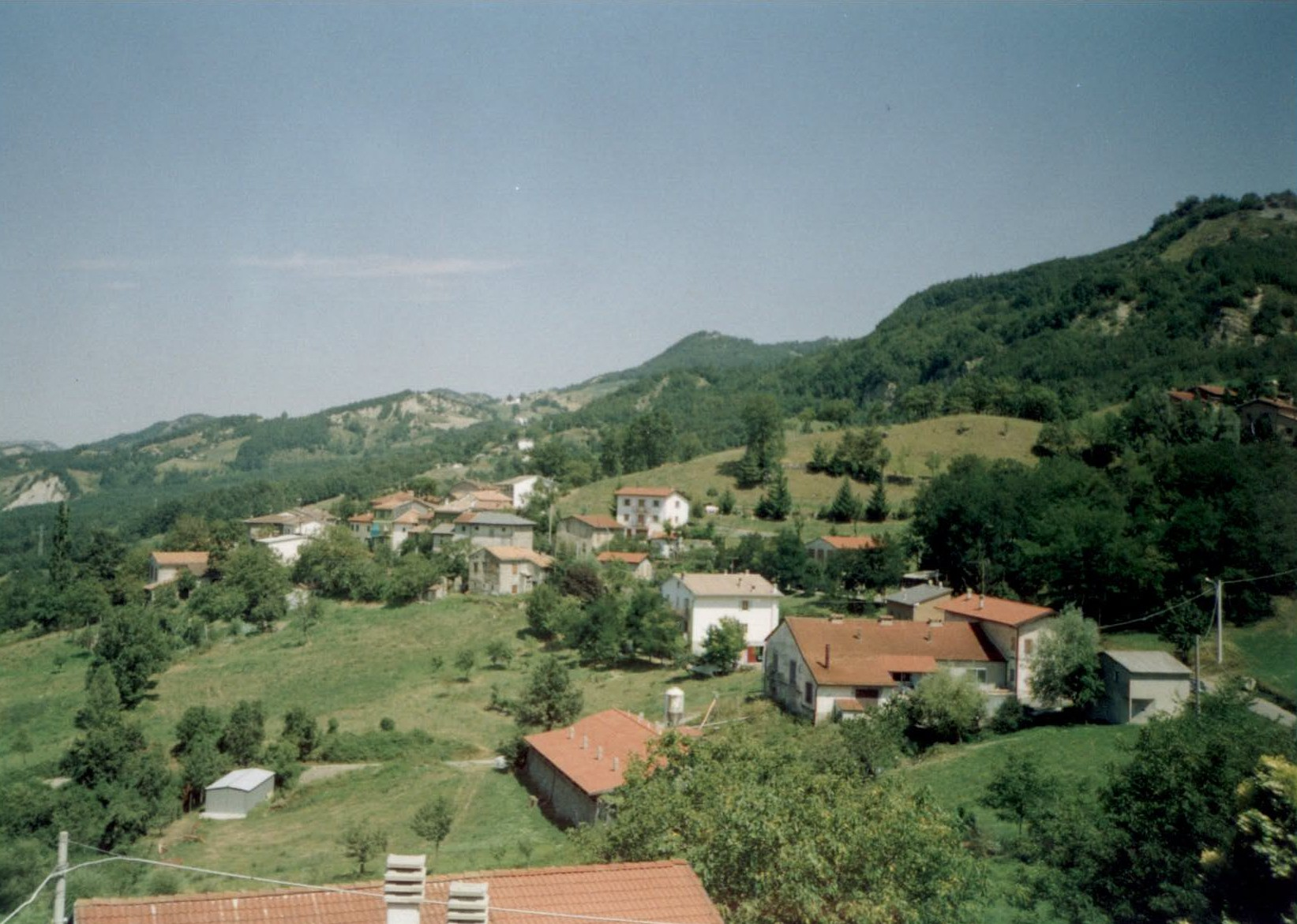
Romanoro - Cerreto

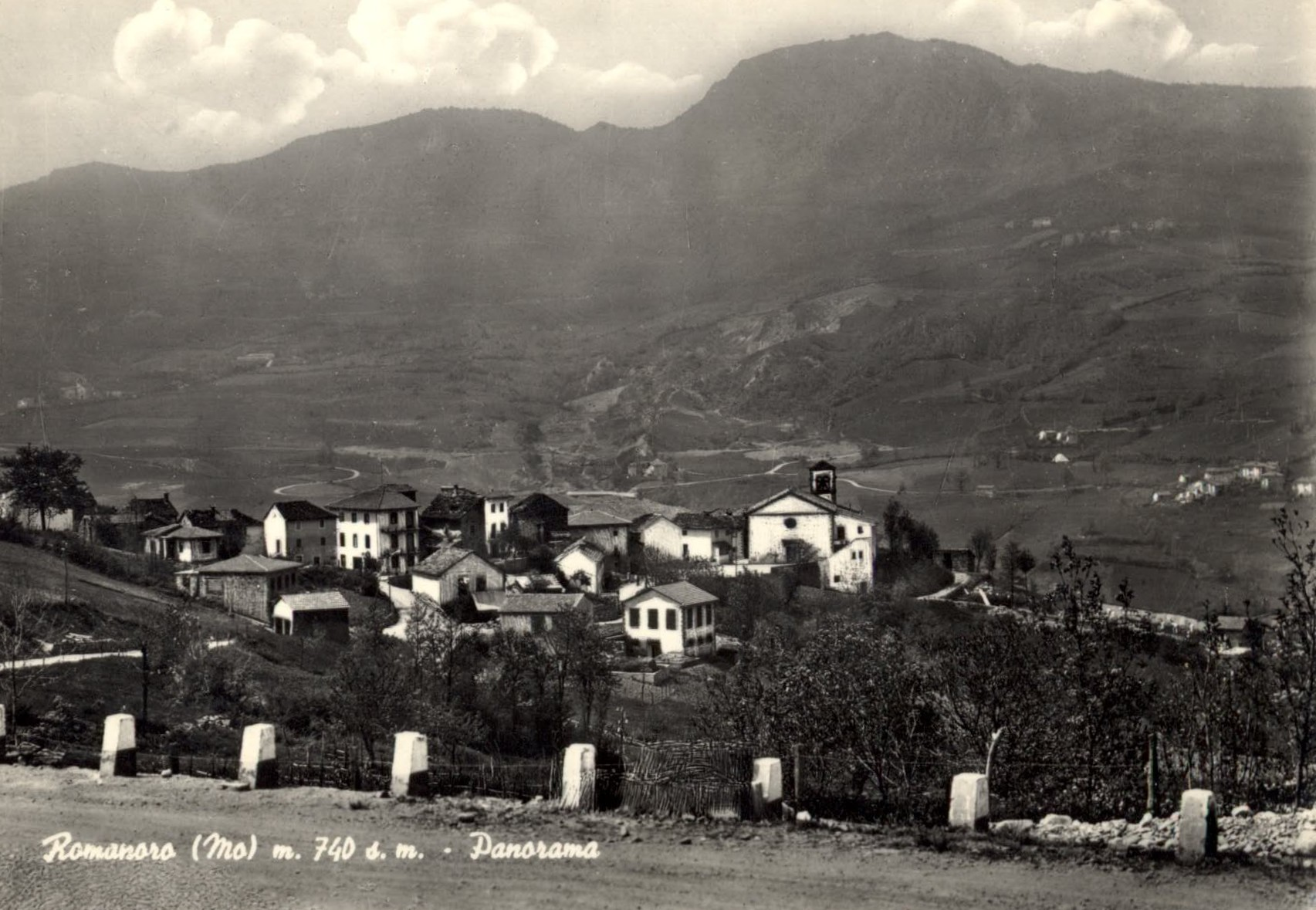
Romanoro - 1964 circa

== See also ==
- Italian: Romanoro
- Bibulca Way
- Villa Minozzo
