= Dolo (river) =

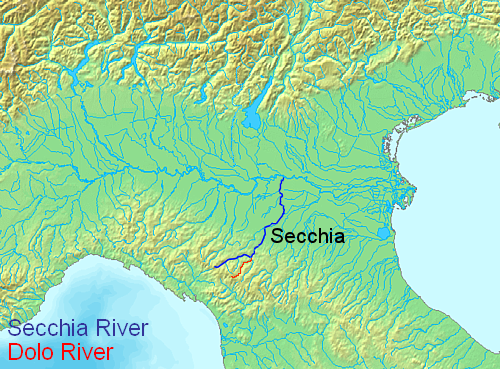

Location
- Country: Italy

Physical characteristics
- Source
  - location: Tuscan-Emilian Apennines, Mount Cusna
  - coordinates: 44°14′24.21″N 10°27′22.31″E
  - elevation: about 1,868 m (6,129 ft)
- Mouth
  - location: Secchia, North of Polinago
  - coordinates: 44°24′24.97″N 10°37′18.80″E
- Length: 26 km (16 mi)

Basin features
- Progression: Secchia→ Po→ Adriatic Sea

The Dolo is a mountain stream that rises on the slopes of Mount Cusna in the Reggio-Emilia province, of the Tuscany-Emilia Romagna Apennine Mountains. It is a tributary of the Secchia, and its length is about 21 to 26 kilometres (13 to 16 mi). The Dolo acts as a natural boundary between the provinces of Reggio Emilia and Modena.

About 5 kilometres (3 mi) before entering the Secchia river, the Dragone mountain stream flows into the Dolo.

At the height of Fontanaluccia there is a dam (44°16′39.72″N 10°30′47.95″E) that provides water for a hydroelectric power plant (44°21′42.48″N 10°34′53.35″E) located 14 kilometres (9 mi) downstream in Farneta.

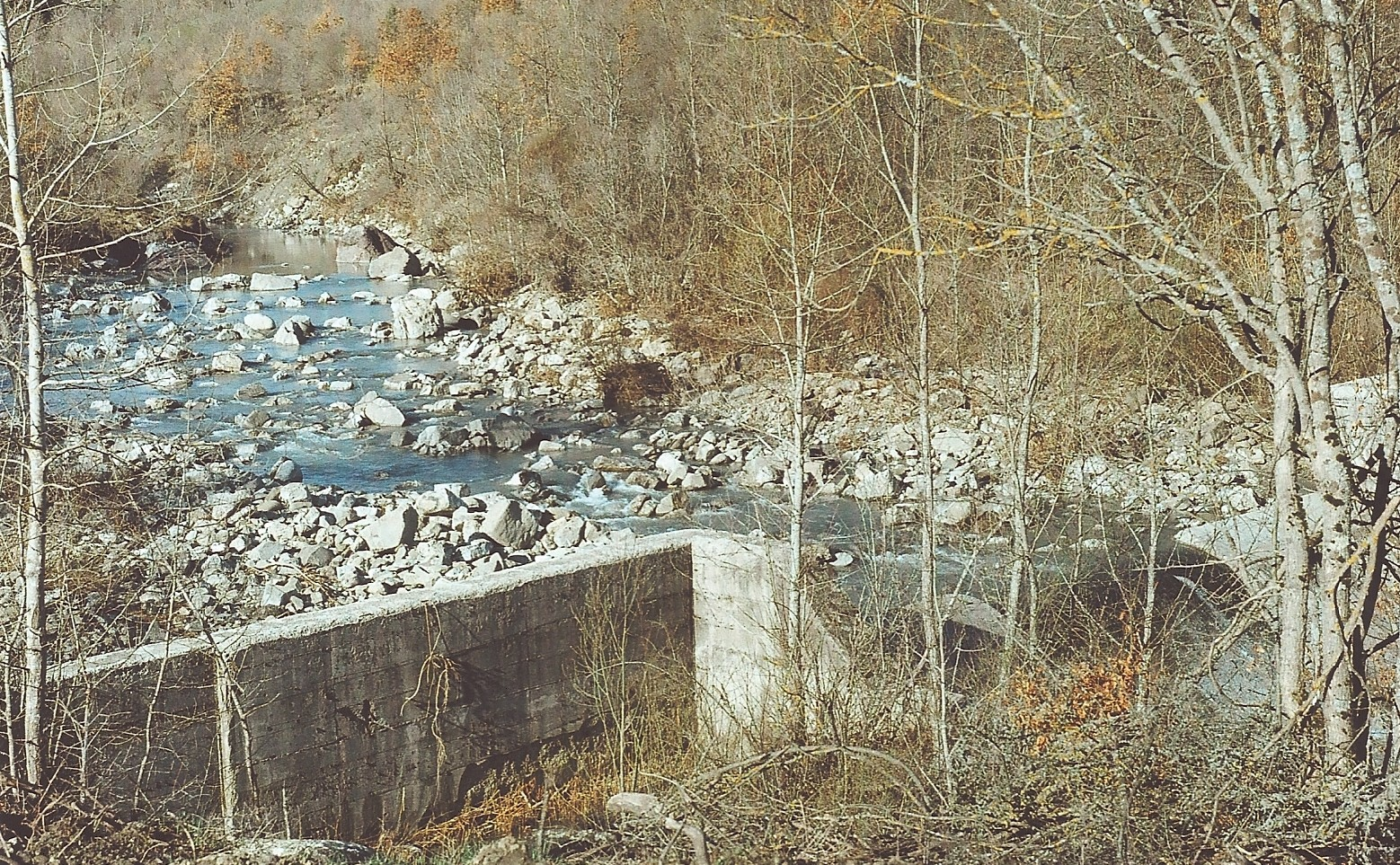
Dolo river near Romanoro

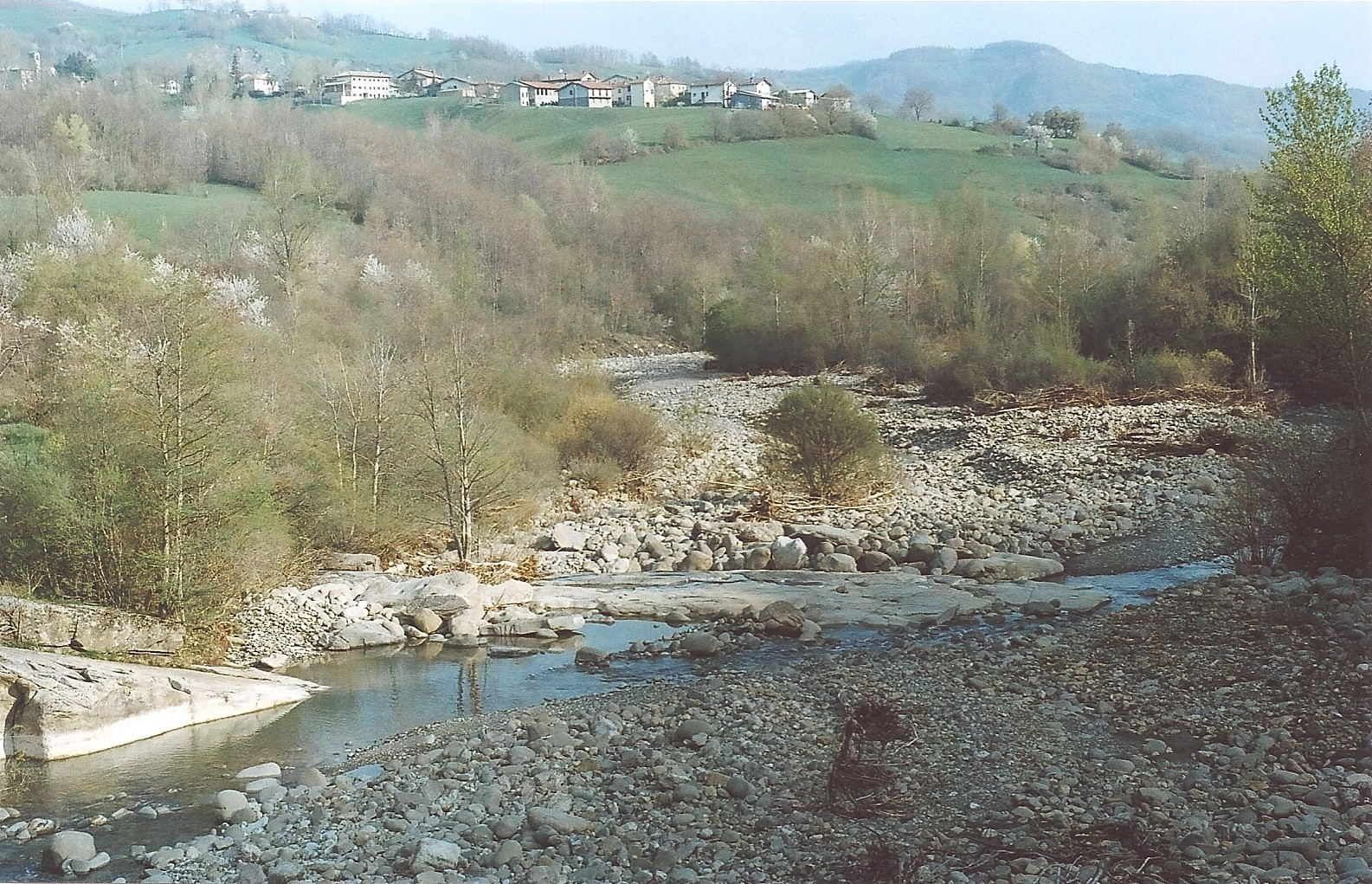
Dolo river seen from the bridge crossing to the nearby village of Morsiano
