= Fontanaluccia =

Fontanaluccia Fontanaluccia
- Frazione
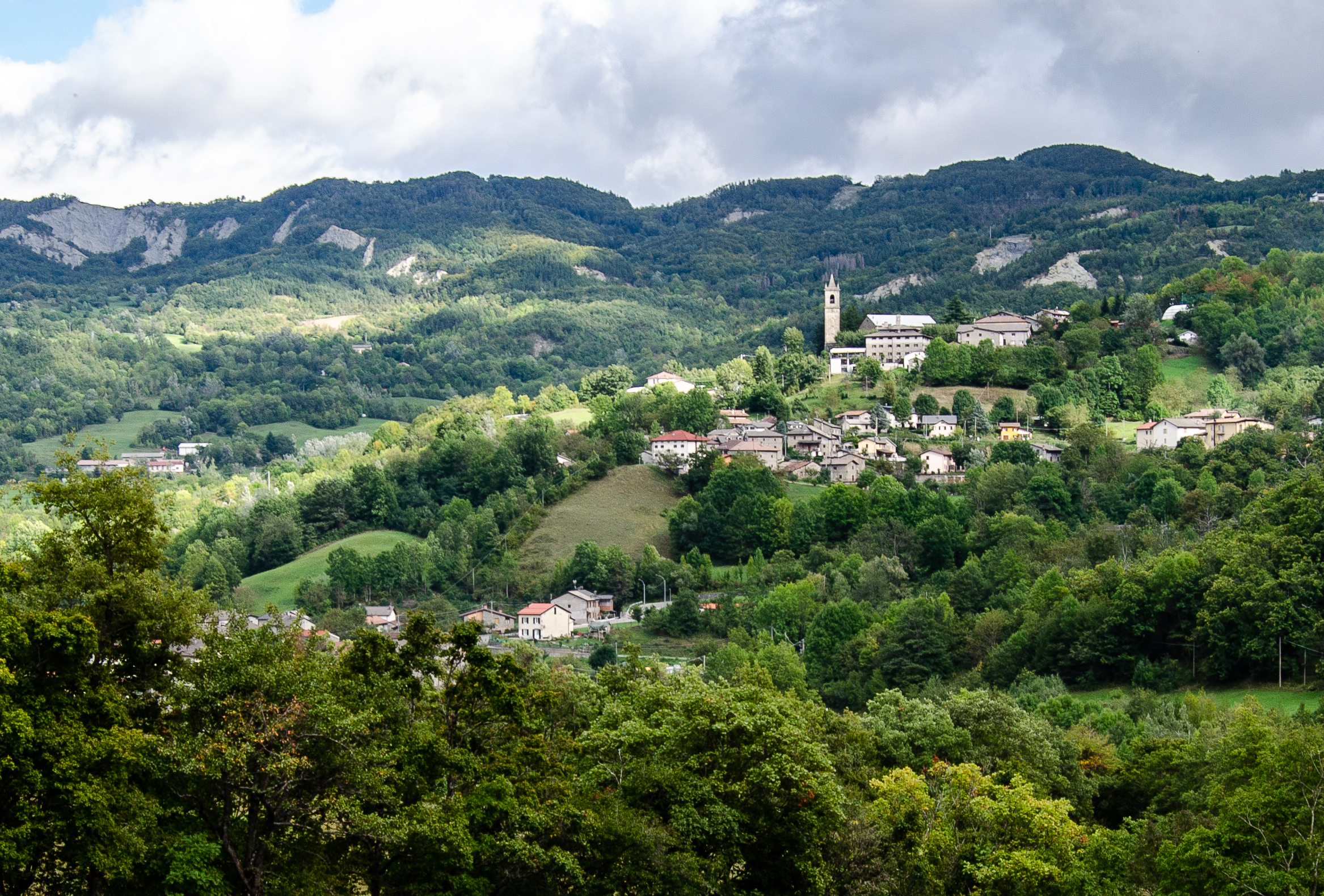
- Fontanaluccia vista dal versante reggiano

- Location of Fontanaluccia in Italy
- Coordinates: 44.2669°N 10.50765°E
- Country: Italy
- Region: Emilia–Romagna
- Province: Modena
- Comune: Frassinoro
- Elevation: 853 m (2,799 ft)

Population (2014)
  - Total: 179
- Time zone: UTC+1 (CET)
  - Summer (DST): UTC+2 (CEST)
- Postal code: 41044
- Dialing code: 0536
- Website: fontanaluccia.com

Fontanaluccia is a frazione of the comune of Frassinoro in the Province of Modena, Emilia-Romagna, central Italy.

It is located at an altitude of 853 m, in the upper Modena Apennines, located on the right bank of the Dolo stream.

== Physical Geography ==
Located in the valley of the Dolo, Fontanaluccia is a few kilometers from the border with the province of Reggio Emilia.

On the opposite bank of the stream is Gazzano, a frazione of the comune of Villa Minozzo in the province of Reggio Emilia.

== History ==
Already at the beginning of the 13th century there is news of this small village inhabited by a few hundred people. From the end of the 17th century it acquired the title of municipality, with the name of Fontanaluccia. Ancient parish seat, the first church was destroyed by a landslide at the beginning of the 19th century; the current one was finished in 1836, while the bell tower placed next to it around 1894.

Fontanaluccia had a relevant part during World War II being host to a Partisans hospital since the summer of 1944 when the Italian resistance movement of Modena liberated the region and established the Montefiorino free zone.

The hospital was destroyed by the Wehrmacht on 2 August 1944 during the military operation called Wallenstein III.

== Districts ==
Fontanaluccia is divided into various districts: Trugoni, Case Cerbiani, La Chiesa, Case Farioli, Case Stefani, Muschioso, Case Campanile, Case Manni, Pere Storte, Casa Bernardi, to name a few.

== Economy ==
While for most of its history Fontanaluccia has been a rural economy, it is known for the creation of bells: during the 19th century two foundries operated there: Bimbi and Stefani.

The Giovanni Battista and Lodovico Bimbi foundry, closed in the 1960s. The Bimbi bells were particularly appreciated in the mountain range of the Apuan Alps, especially in Garfagnana and Versilia. The typical characteristic of the Bimbi shape is the falling lower octave, which characterized mannerist bells of the 16th century.

The Giovanni Battista Stefani foundry cast bells for Polinago in 1830 and also for Fanano in 1823; the most famous bell produced by this factory was produced in 1842 is still found on the bell tower of the Tuscan Cathedral of San Miniato, in the Province of Florence.

== The Dam ==
Famous among other things for the dam on the Dolo river, which is located at the bottom of the valley and supplies water for the Farneta hydroelectric power plant. The vaulted concrete barrier is supported by buttresses. Construction work began in 1925 and ended in 1928.
