= San Pellegrino in Alpe =

San Pellegrino in Alpe is a locality in the Tuscan-Emilian Apennines at an elevation of 1525. Part of its territory is a frazione of Frassinoro, a municipality in the Emilian province of Modena, while another part belongs to Castiglione di Garfagnana, located in the Tuscan province of Lucca.

The section under Frassinoro is an exclave of Emilia-Romagna, as it is entirely surrounded by Tuscany and geographically separated from its own region.

== Geography ==
=== Territory ===
It can be reached from Emilia-Romagna via the Passo delle Radici (Radici Pass) and from Tuscany by a very steep provincial road climbing from the Garfagnana. It is the highest permanently inhabited locality in the Apennines that is not a municipal seat, nestled on one side of the Alpe di San Pellegrino (1701 m a.s.l.), easily accessible via hiking trails.

== History ==
The Radici pass, between the Serchio and Secchia valleys, has been important and traveled since ancient times, becoming a major transit route during the Middle Ages for merchants, pilgrims, and armies. Close to the pass, a pilgrims' hospice and a church linked to the hermits Pellegrino and Bianco were established. Pellegrino, traditionally believed to be the son of a Scottish king, is said to have lived for years in prayer in the surrounding wild mountains. His presence, tied to popular devotion, is linked with numerous stories and legends. However, Pellegrino and Bianco have never been officially canonized.

The pass was long contested among the people of Lucca, Modena, and Reggio Emilia, but in the late Middle Ages, Lucca prevailed, and the hospice and church fell definitively within the territory of the Lucca diocese (see Archdiocese of Lucca) and the Republic of Lucca. After 1430, the Este Dukes of Modena and Ferrara, taking advantage of the war between Lucca and Florence, entered the Serchio valley with their troops and, through shrewd diplomacy, gained the allegiance of many settlements in the Garfagnana. In 1433, the emperor granted the hospital and church of San Pellegrino to the Este family of Modena, with further imperial confirmations in 1509, 1526, and 1535.

Lucca, however, maintained its independence thanks to alliances with Genoa and Milan and its victory at the Battle of the Serchio. The Este retained control of much of the upper Serchio valley, but Lucca kept several strategically and economically significant vicariates. One of them was Castiglione di Garfagnana, centered on its heavily fortified capital and including villages, mountain passes, and the locality of San Pellegrino in Alpe. The Duke of Modena sought to counter Lucca's control of the main route from Lombardy to the Serchio and managed to station troops near the stables opposite the church. The houses today forming the exclave of Frassinoro (mostly on the northeast side of the village square) correspond to those soldiers' barracks and stables. Even the important pilgrimage church of the saints was divided between the two states, although ecclesiastically it continued to fall under the Archbishop of Lucca.

A major moment in San Pellegrino's history came with the construction of the Via Vandelli between 1740 and 1750. The Duke of Modena refused to route the road near the walls of Castiglione and asked Lucca to allow it to cross the Alpe di San Pellegrino, from which the road would descend—partly in Luccan territory—toward Pieve Fosciana. Lucca recognized that this route might harm Castiglione’s trade but also realized the advantages of opening a route between the Ligurian Sea and the Po Valley. After long negotiations, Lucca authorized the construction through the village of Chiozza (Luccan) and the woods of Roncagliana (administered by Lucca but subject to timber rights by Este subjects).

Despite its historical importance, the Via Vandelli never supplanted the Castiglione route due to its steep gradients, which made maintenance particularly difficult on the Apuan side. Within a few years, that section became unusable by carts and reverted to a broad mule track. In the 19th century, with the construction of the Giardini Ximenes road (Abetone route), the Foce a Giovo, and the Radici road, San Pellegrino lost importance as a pass but remained a major summer pilgrimage destination for people from the Serchio valley and Modena area.

A well-known legend associated with San Pellegrino is the "Devil’s Leap" (Giro del Diavolo). According to the tale, Saint Pellegrino of the Alps, tempted by the Devil, lost his patience and struck him so hard that the Devil flew across the valley, crashed into the Apuan Alps, and pierced a hole through them, forming the Monte Forato (1234 m a.s.l.), a 15-meter-long and 12-meter-high natural stone arch visible from San Pellegrino in Alpe. Near the village is the very place called the "Devil’s Leap," where pilgrims still leave a stone they carry with them as an offering.

== Landmarks ==
Sanctuary of San Pellegrino in Alpe, the core of the locality, was first mentioned in a document from 1110, although its origins are likely older. An important pilgrimage site and hospice for travelers between Tuscany and Emilia, it was long contested. It was rebuilt in the second half of the 15th century. The remains of Saints Pellegrino of the Alps and Bianco rest inside.

== Culture ==
=== Education ===
==== Museums ====
Ethnographic Museum "Don Lorenzo Pellegrini"

== Sport ==
=== Cycling ===
The climb to San Pellegrino in Alpe, on the Tuscan side, has extremely difficult segments with gradients reaching 18%, making it one of the toughest climbs in the entire Apennine range. It has featured multiple times in the Giro d'Italia, in the editions of 1989, 1995, 2000, and 2025.

Year	Stage	Stage winner	Pink Jersey	First over the top
1989	21ª: La Spezia > Prato	(Italy) Gianni Bugno	(France) Laurent Fignon	(Belgium) Claude Criquiélion
1995	11ª: Pietrasanta > Il Ciocco	(Italy) Enrico Zaina	(Switzerland) Tony Rominger	(Italy) Enrico Zaina
2000	9ª: Prato > Abetone	(Italy) Francesco Casagrande	(Italy) Francesco Casagrande	(Italy) Francesco Casagrande
2025	11ª: Viareggio > Castelnovo ne' Monti	(Ecuador) Richard Carapaz	(Mexico) Isaac del Toro	(Italy) Lorenzo Fortunato
