= Marola =

Marola can be one of several villages in Italy:

- Marola in the comune of Torri di Quartesolo, in the province of Vicenza, Veneto.
- Marola in the comune of La Spezia, in Liguria.
- Marola in the comune of Carpineti, in the province of Reggio Emilia, Emilia Romagna.
