= Sanctuary of San Pellegrino in Alpe =

Religious Sanctuary in Alpe, Italy

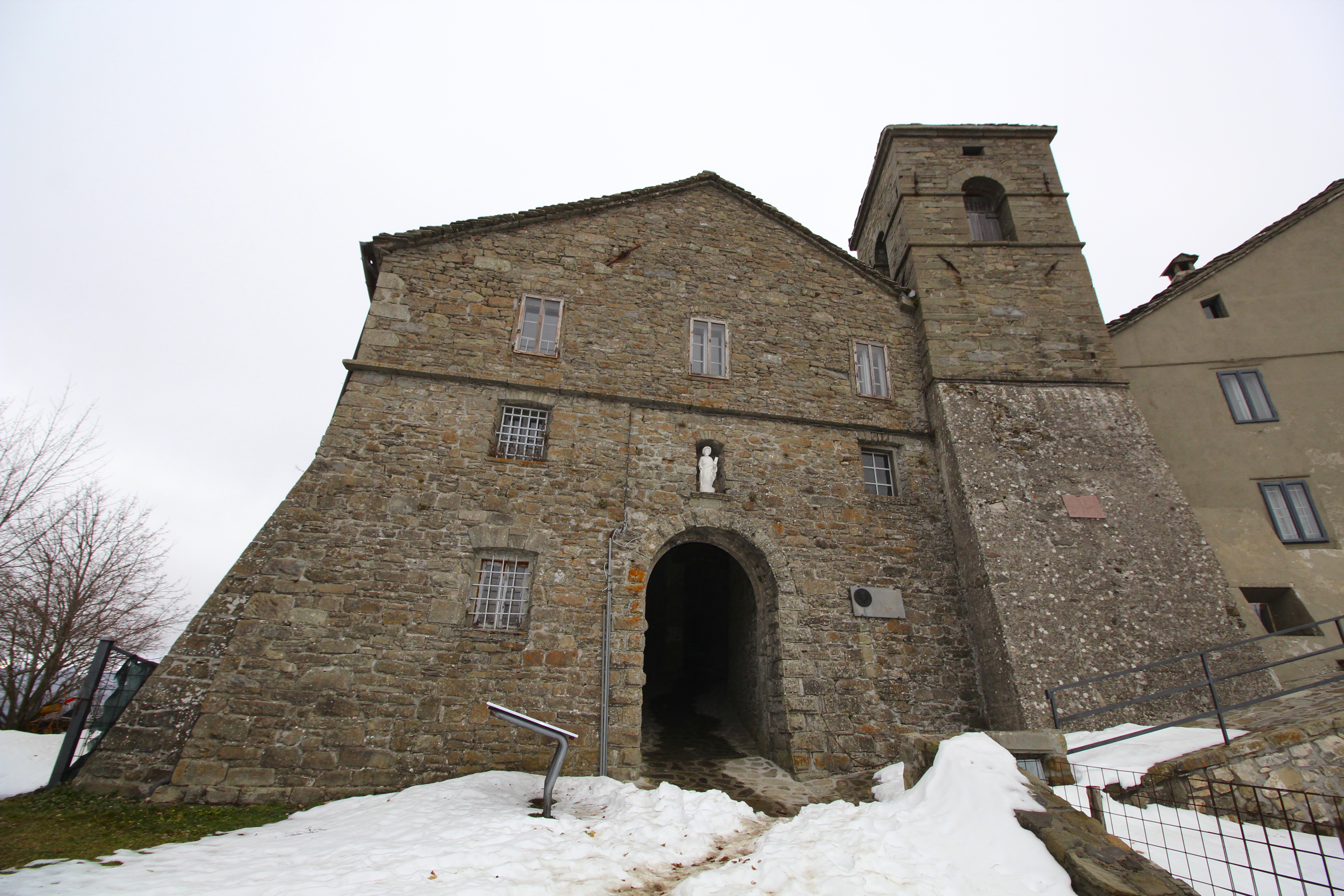
The sanctuary and church of the saints Santi Pellegrino e Bianco

The Santuario di San Pellegrino in Alpe or Santi Pellegrino e Bianco is a Roman Catholic church and adjacent hostel-hospital complex on a hilltop within the town limits of Castiglione di Garfagnana, province of Lucca, region of Tuscany, Italy. It lies in a rural site along the Bibulca Way.

== History ==
The site is documented in a papal bull of Pope Alexander III in 1168, noting the hostel was led not by monks, but by lay workers. By 1200, a church had been erected allowing for the arrival of the relics of Saint Pellegrino. By 1400, the church was refurbished and in 1473, a small sepulchral monument, in form of a tempietto, was constructed by Matteo Civitali. Further refurbishment were pursued in the 17th century, adding the relics of San Bianco. The present church was re-erected in 1908 with the collapse of the former structure.

The legend of San Pellegrino, a patron of those travelling to Rome along the pilgrimage routes, led to local veneration. Stories make him out to be the prince of a Scottish King during the late Roman Empire, who sought a hermit existence in a cave in this mountain, and died there until his relics were miraculously discovered.

== See also ==
- San Pellegrino in Alpe
