= Vandelli =

Vandelli is an Italian surname. Notable people with the surname include:

- Claudio Vandelli (born 1961), Italian cyclist
- Domenico Vandelli (1735–1816), Italian naturalist
- Fernando Vandelli (1907–1977), Italian hammer thrower
- Mark-Francis Vandelli (born 1989), English television personality
- Maurizio Vandelli (born 1964), Italian cyclist

== See also ==
- Via Vandelli, a historical road in Italy
