= Frassinoro =

- Comune
- Comune di Frassinoro
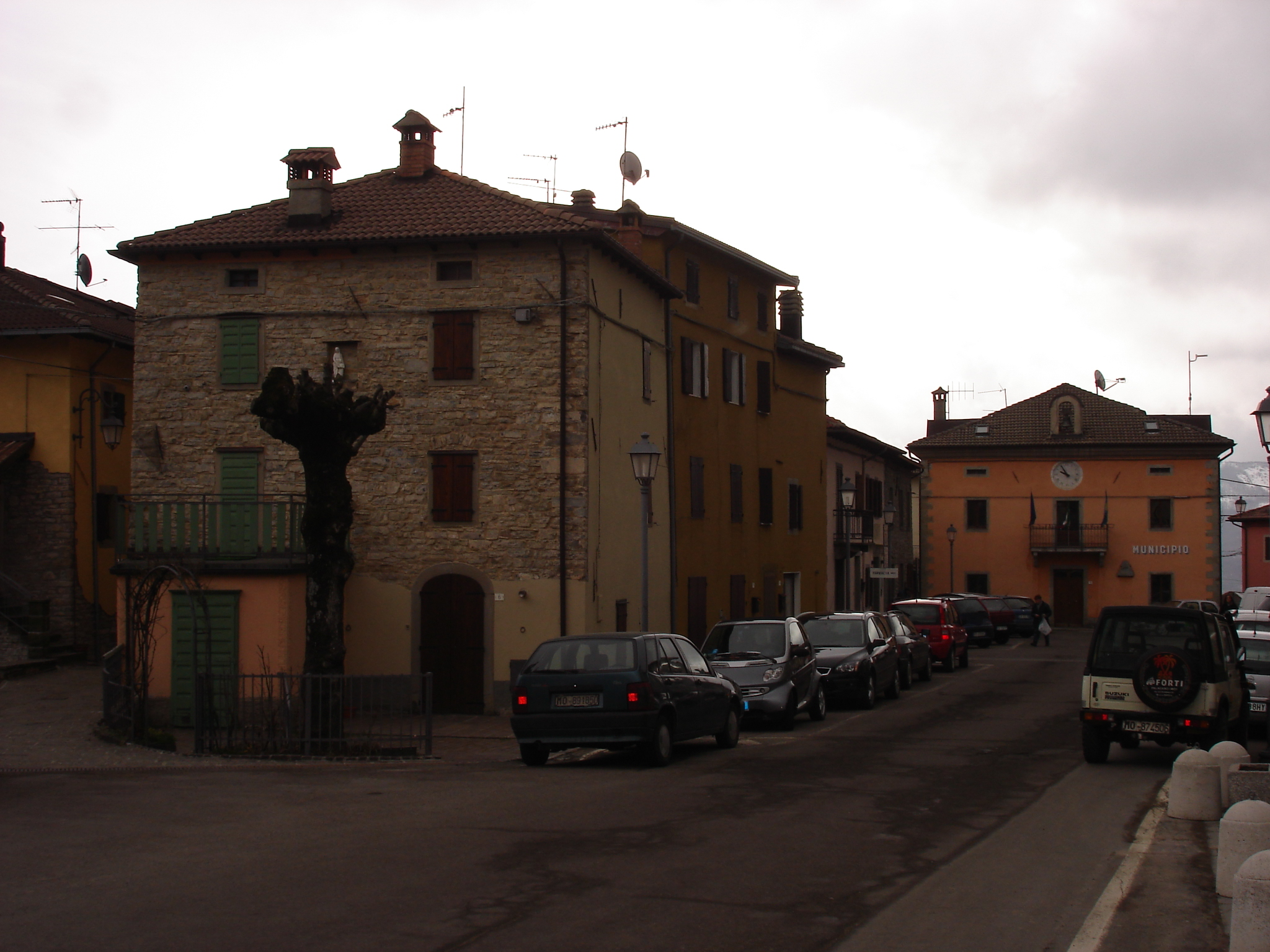

- Location within Italy Location within Emilia-Romagna
- Coordinates: 44°18′N 10°34′E
- Country: Italy
- Region: Emilia-Romagna
- Province: Modena (MO)
- Frazioni: Piandelagotti, Fontanaluccia, Rovolo, Romanoro, Riccovolto, Sassatella, Cargedolo

Government
  - Mayor: Elio Pierazzi

Area
  - Total: 95.7 km^{2} (36.9 sq mi)
- Elevation: 1,131 m (3,711 ft)

Population (31 March 2017)
  - Total: 1,896
  - Density: 19.8/km^{2} (51.3/sq mi)
- Demonym: Frassinoresi
- Time zone: UTC+1 (CET)
  - Summer (DST): UTC+2 (CEST)
- Postal code: 41044, 41040
- Dialing code: 0536
- Saint day: August 15
- Website: Official website

Frassinoro (Frignanese: Frasnôr) is a comune (municipality) in the Province of Modena in the Italian region Emilia-Romagna, located about 70 kilometres (43 mi) southwest of Bologna and about 50 kilometres (31 mi) southwest of Modena.

== Climate ==
Climate data for Frassinoro (1991-2020, precipitation only)
Month	Jan	Feb	Mar	Apr	May	Jun	Jul	Aug	Sep	Oct	Nov	Dec	Year
Average precipitation mm	73.8	72.9	68	83.5	91.5	80.5	51.6	61.8	87.2	126.5	161.1	105.8	1,064.2
Average precipitation inches	2.91	2.87	2.7	3.29	3.60	3.17	2.03	2.43	3.43	4.98	6.34	4.17	41.92
Average precipitation days (≥ 1.0 mm)	6.9	6.7	7.7	9.5	10	7.9	5.8	6.2	7.6	8.7	11.8	8.9	97.7

== See also ==
- Bibulca Way
