= Carpineti =

- Comune
- Comune di Carpineti
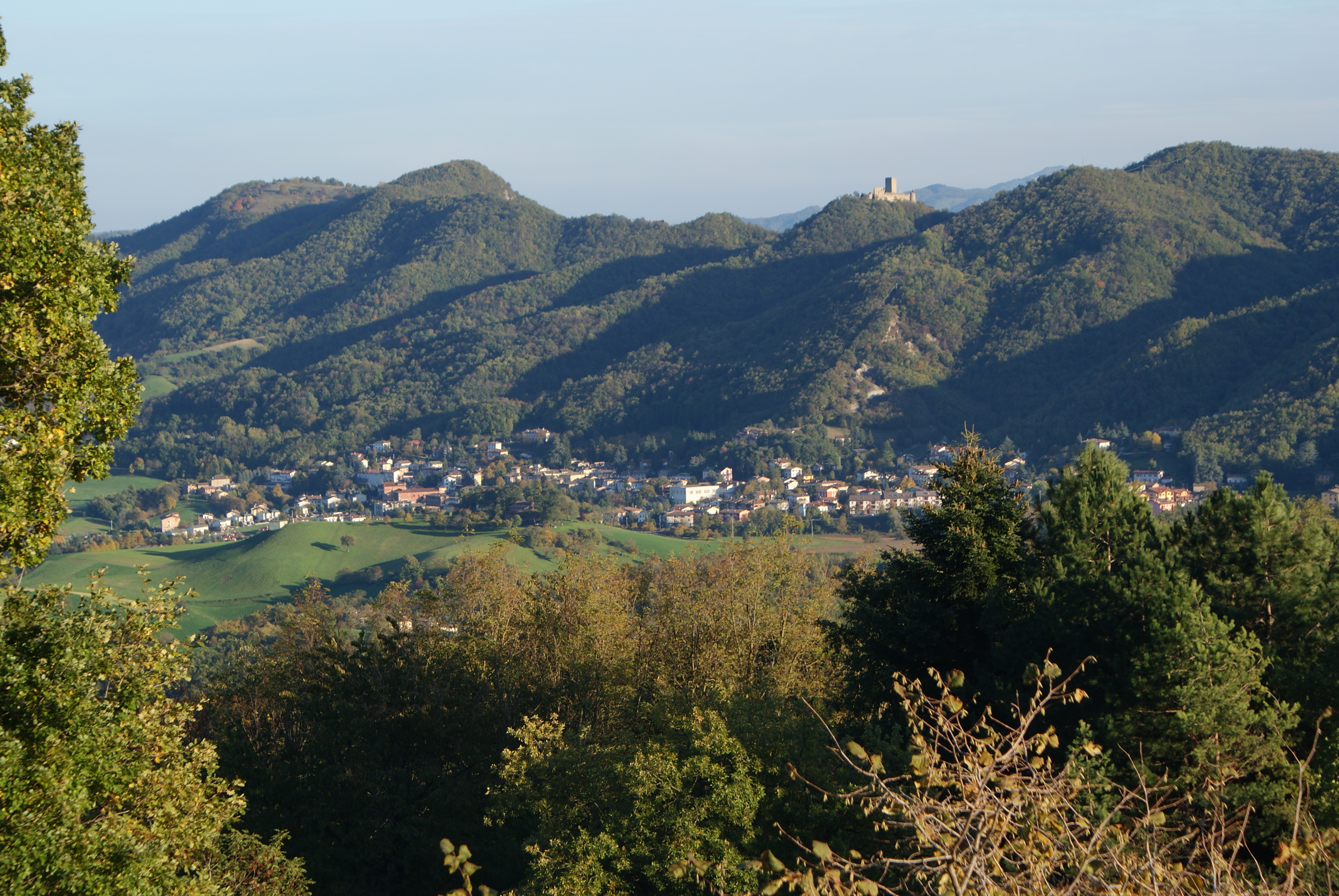
- View of Carpineti

- Location within Italy Location within Emilia-Romagna
- Coordinates: 44°27′N 10°31′E
- Country: Italy
- Region: Emilia-Romagna
- Province: Province of Reggio Emilia (RE)
- Frazioni: Bera, Branciglia, Busanella, Ca' Benno, Ca' de Beretti, Ca' de Lanzi, Ca' Dorsini, Ca' Morelli, Campo dell'Oppio, Campovecchio, Ceriola, Cigarello, Colombaia Secchia, Costa di Iatica, Giavello, Iatica, La Svolta, Le Casette, Marola, Migliara, Montelago, Onfiano, Pantano, Poiago, Pontone, Riana, Rola, Saccaggio, Savognatica, San Donnino, Seminario, Spignana, Tincana, Valestra, Velluciana, Villa, Villaprara.

Government
  - Mayor: Tiziano Borghi

Area
  - Total: 89.57 km^{2} (34.58 sq mi)
- Elevation: 562 m (1,844 ft)

Population (31 December 2016)
  - Total: 4,011
  - Density: 44.78/km^{2} (116.0/sq mi)
- Demonym: Carpinetani
- Time zone: UTC+1 (CET)
  - Summer (DST): UTC+2 (CEST)
- Postal code: 42033
- Dialing code: 0522
- Website: Official website

Carpineti (Reggiano: Carpnèida [karpˈnɛi̯da], locally Carpnéda) is a comune (municipality) in the Province of Reggio Emilia in the Italian region Emilia-Romagna, located about 70 kilometres (43 mi) west of Bologna and about 30 kilometres (19 mi) southwest of Reggio Emilia.

Carpineti borders the following municipalities: Baiso, Casina, Castelnovo ne' Monti, Toano, Viano, Villa Minozzo.

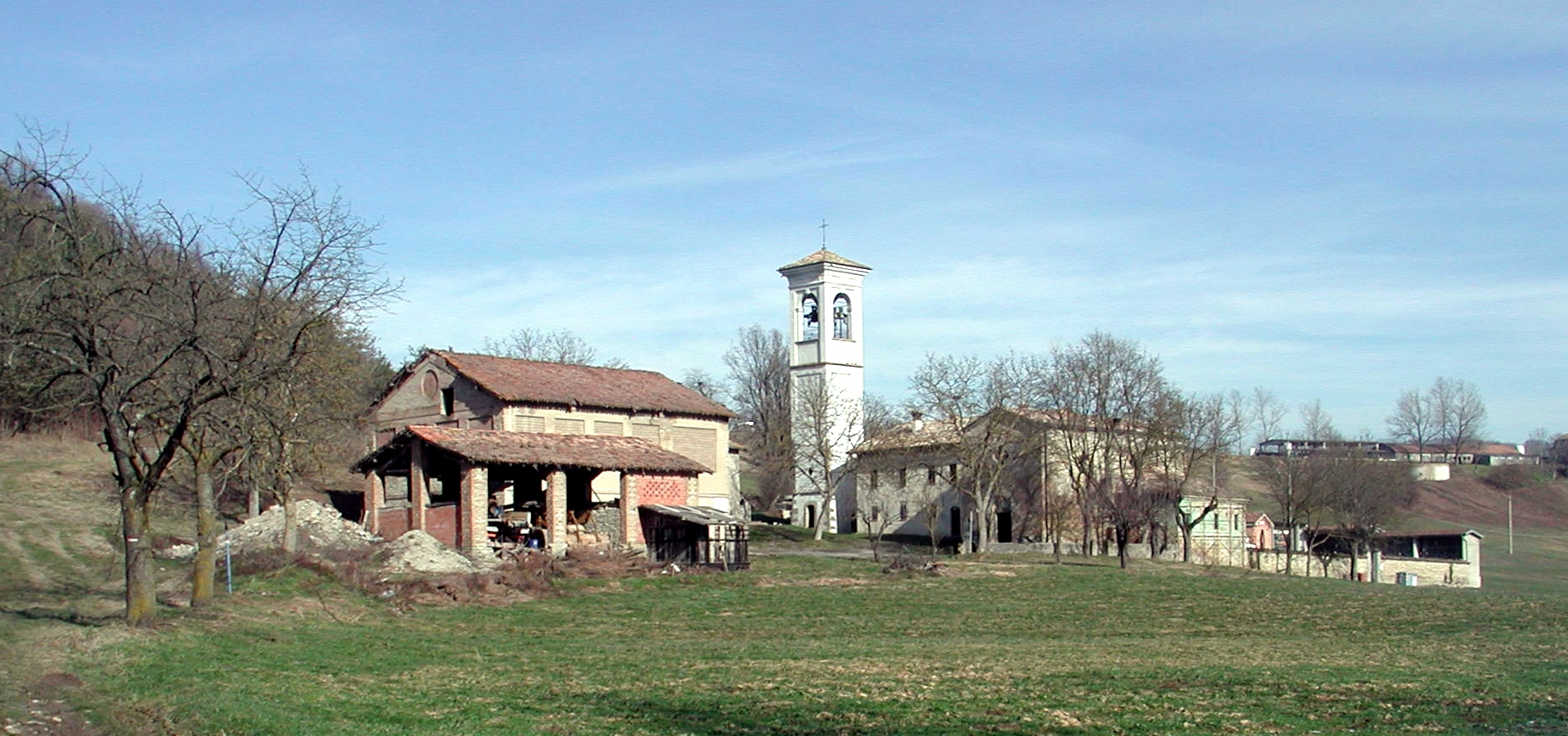
Church of San Donnino
