= Filarmonica Alpina =

The Filarmonica Alpina of Castiglione di Garfagnana, Italy is a music company associated with the Garfagnana region.

== History ==
The company was founded in 1858 as the "Fanfara Popolare" by a group of musicians with the purpose of playing music at special events. Such events as religious processions, civil parades, and private functions. Later, in 1874, it became a communal band.

The Filarmonica Alpina was inactive throughout World War I, it reformed afterwards and has continued uninterrupted ever since. The Filarmonica Alpina represents one of the many living traditions of the Castiglione di Garfagnana and is present on many important occasions in the life of the community. Today the musical group is composed of seventy elements and directed by Silvano Marcalli and its chairman Vittorio Pieroni.
