= Morsiano =

- Frazione
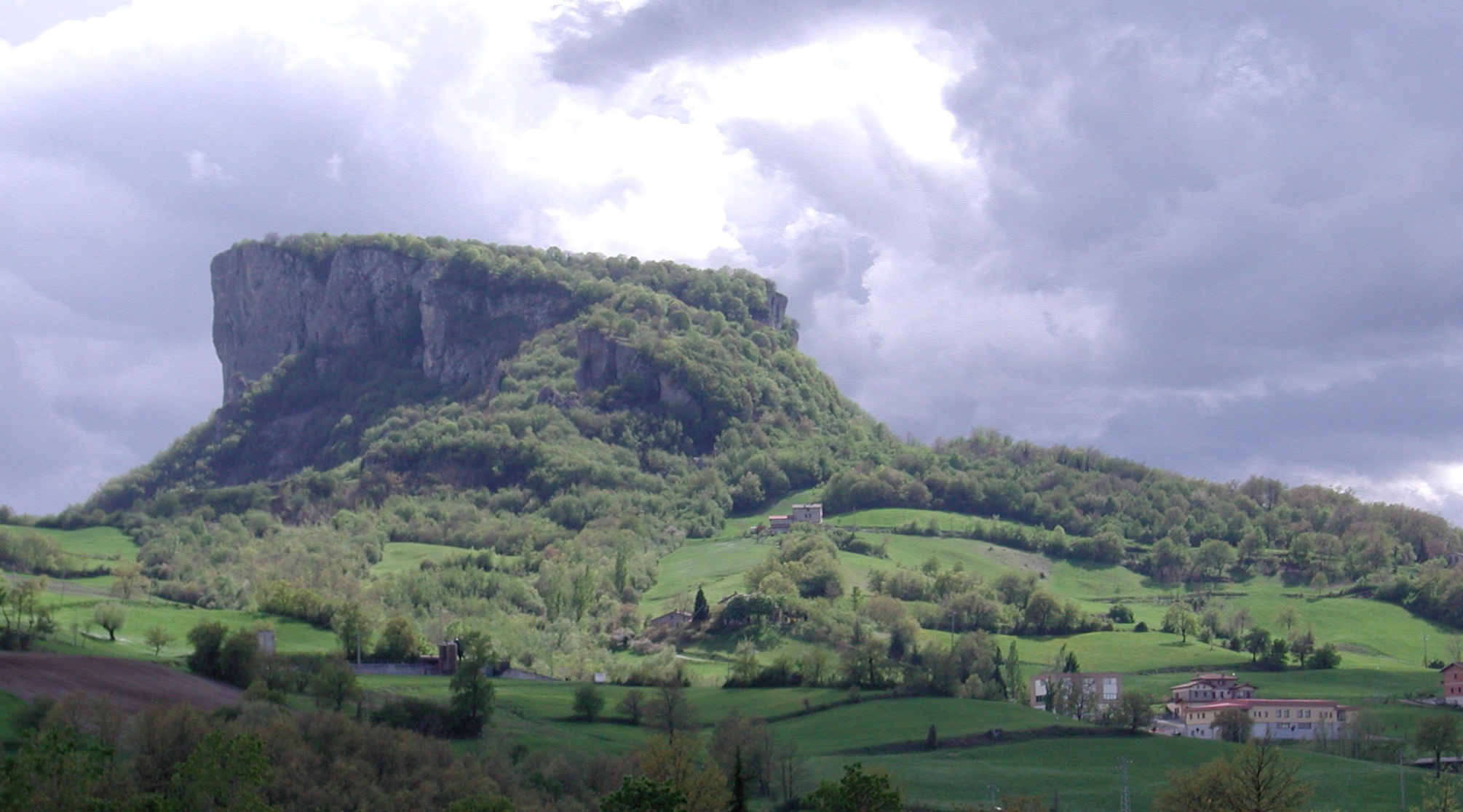
- The particular shape of the Pietra di Bismantova in the province of Reggio Emilia

- Location of Morsiano in Italy
- Coordinates: 44°18′18″N 10°30′23″E
- Country: Italy
- Region: Emilia-Romagna
- Province: Reggio Emilia (RE)
- Comune: Villa Minozzo

Area
  - Total: 5.5 km^{2} (2.1 sq mi)
- Elevation: 720 m (2,360 ft)

Population (2001)
  - Total: 134
  - Density: 24/km^{2} (63/sq mi)
- Demonym: Morsianesi
- Time zone: UTC+1 (CET)
  - Summer (DST): UTC+2 (CEST)
- Postal code: 40022
- Dialing code: 0542
- Website: Municipal website

Morsiano is a hamlet (administratively a frazione) of Villa Minozzo in the province of Reggio Emilia. Located in the tuscany-emilia apennines near the Mount Cusna slopes. It is about 720 meters (2,360 feet) above sea level.

== Overview ==
The town of Morsiano has a population of 134 residents all year long. Besides Morsiano there are other little villages which make up its frazione; the main ones are: Case Rossi, Monte Bore, Strinati, Costalta and La Costa.

== History ==
The hamlet is first mentioned in 1302 as being a part of the medieval comune of Toano. A census of the 18th century estimated the population to be 395. A little Marian niche dedicated to Our Lady dating back to the 1858 can be seen in the eastern part of this village.

== See also ==
- Frazioni of the Provincie of Reggio Emilia
