= Busanella =

Coordinates: 44°29′N 10°28′E

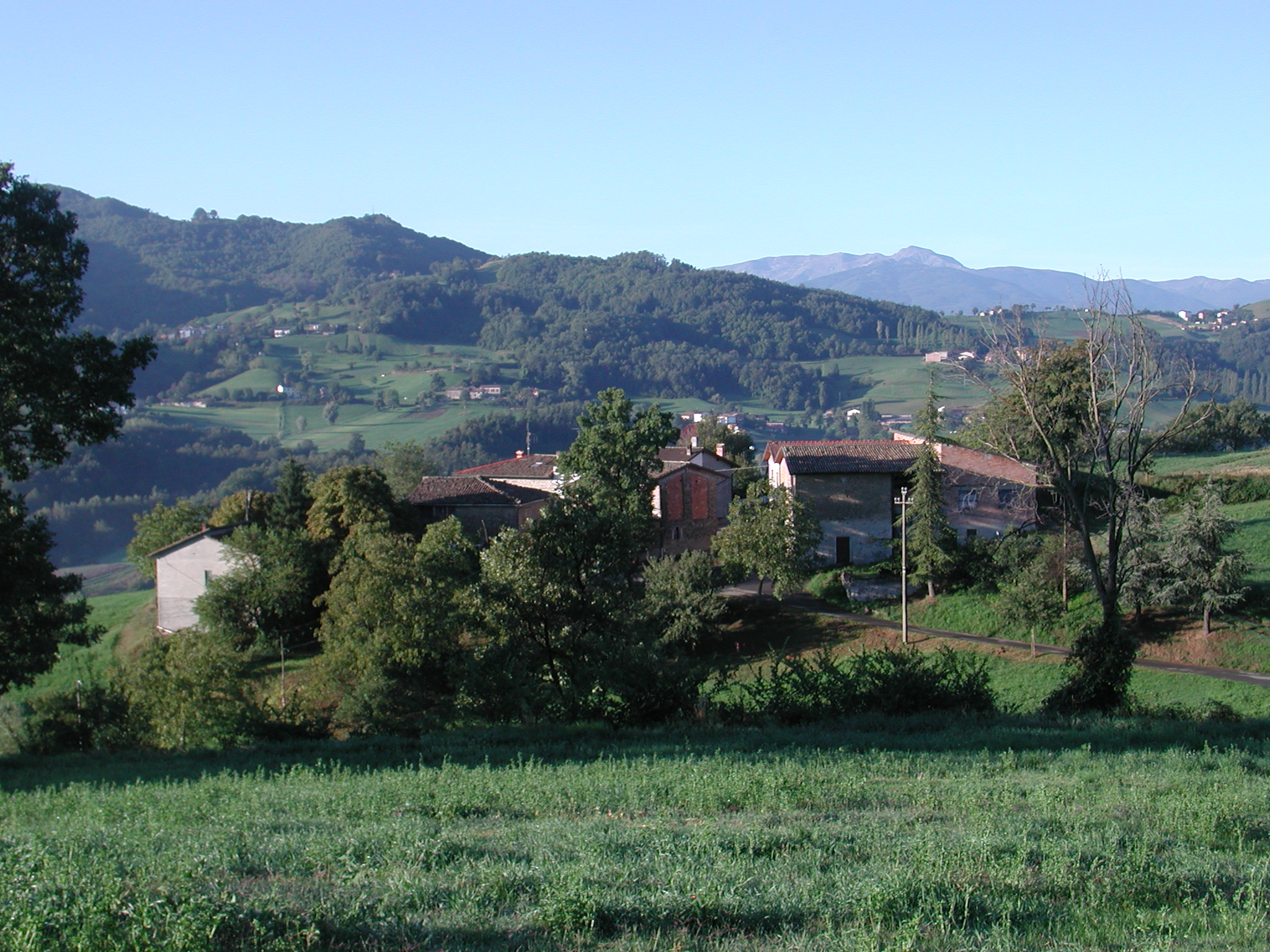

Busanella is a hamlet (frazione) of the Italian Municipality of Carpineti, in the province of Reggio Emilia. The whole frazione, with other small hamlets, is also known as San Biagio, from the name of the parish church, which was a filial church of the pleban church of Carpineti. Busanella is located in the Apennines mountains, near the river Tresinaro. The hamlet is first named in a document of the year 1240. In the neighbourhood there are other small hamlets (località), among them Frombolara, an ancient possession of the benedictine monks of the abbey of Marola, Pignedolo and Cantigalli. Under the Este rule Busanella was a county of the Duchy of Reggio, feud of the count Orazio Malaguzzi, of the family of the poet Ludovico Ariosto. Busanella, together with other hamlets of the frazione, counts about 170 inhabitants.
