= Bibulca Way =

Ancient Roman road

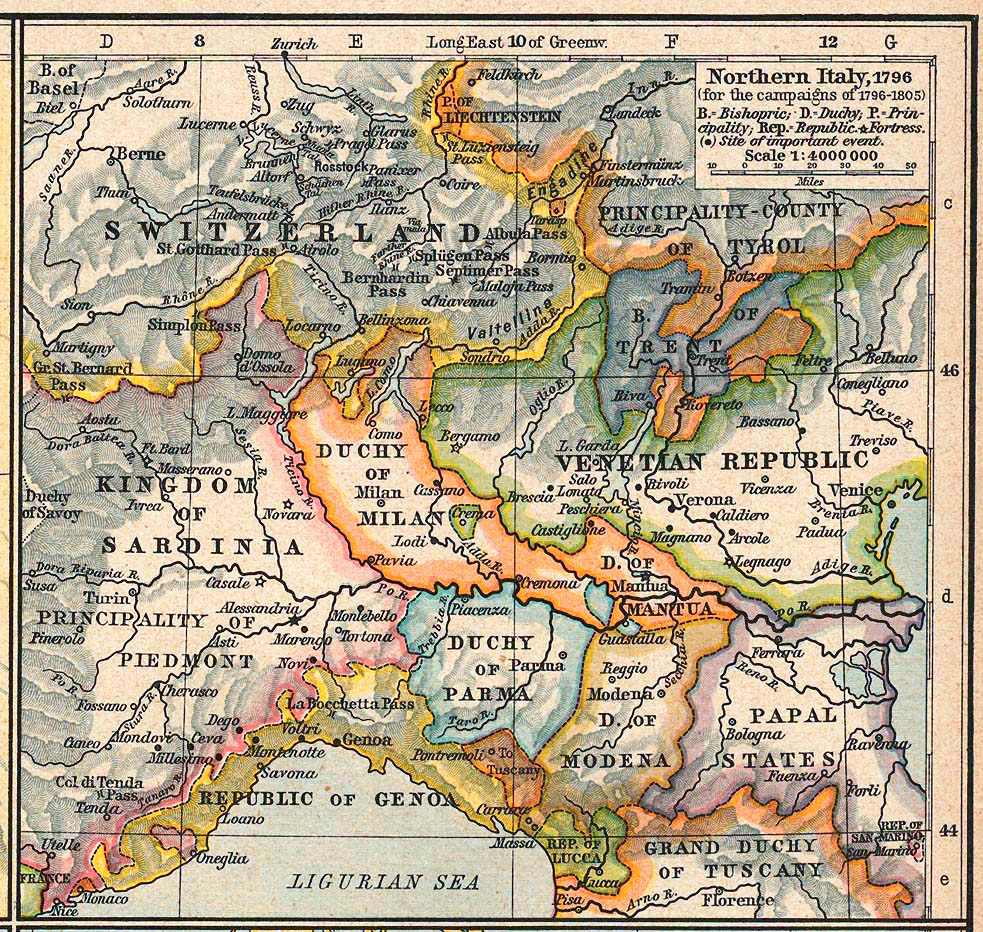
The area of the Bibulca Way at the time of House of Este

Bibulca Way (in Italian:Via Bibulca) was an old road dating back to the 11th century that used to link up Modena with Lucca and it was part of a much bigger network of roads. It starts where the Dragone River flows into the Dolo River in the La Piana locality (44°22′44.15″N 10°37′11.22″E) and finishes at San Pellegrino in Alpe (44°11′30.55″N 10°28′55.39″E), a hamlet (currently a frazione of the commune of Castiglione di Garfagnana) located on the ridge that separates the Tuscan from the Emilian Apennines. It was also called the Imperial Way due to its high toll that had to be paid in order to use it and that it could host a cart drawn by two oxen one beside the other, a luxury for the time. It has a length of 30 kilometers, starting from a height of 360 metres and arriving at a height of 1,529 metres. Now it is used as an amateur trekking path that runs alongside the Strada provinciale 32MO road and in certain stretches shares the same route.

== History ==
The road dates back to the early Roman times, when the ancient tribe of the Frinati, part of the population of the Liguri, gave battle for over twenty years to the Roman Republic. When the Romans, once defeated the Frinati in 175 BC, managed to settle in the area, they built a thick system of paths and roads. In fact, the name comes from Latin Bi-, meaning "two", and bulca, meaning "oxen". According to some historians, however, the road may actually date back to the pre-Roman period.

In the Middle Ages it was called the Via Nova. At the arrival of the Lombards, the road lost most of its importance, when in the 7th century, Radici Pass was opened in order to bypass the remaining Byzantine possessions. The most important era for the road began when the Abbey of Frassinoro was inaugurated by the local ruler Matilda of Tuscany: the abbey overtook by importance the Pieve of Rubbiano, the local main town of the time, that used to collect the tolls for and maintained all the local roads including the Via Bibulca.

The road was often a matter of content between the free commune of Modena and the Abbey of Frassinoro: the latter was assigned its care officially in 1164 by Frederick I because of the frequent robberies that took place in the nearby Garfagnana. Along the route were constructed 2 hospices: one over at Saint Geminiano and another one over to San Pellegrino in Alpe. In 1522 Ludovico Ariosto, while going to Garfagnana to take its government, tested the conditions of the road saying that it was an "iniquitous road".

Finally in the 18th century other trans-Apennine roads were constructed, including the Via Vandelli: this mostly shared the same old route of the Bibulca, although on the final ridge towards Saint Pilgrim in Alpe moved to another route. Towards the end of the 18th century the Via Giardini road was laid down by the House of Este Dukes, and the Via Bibulca road was abandoned.

== See also ==
- Montefiorino
