= Montefiorino =

- Comune
- Comune di Montefiorino
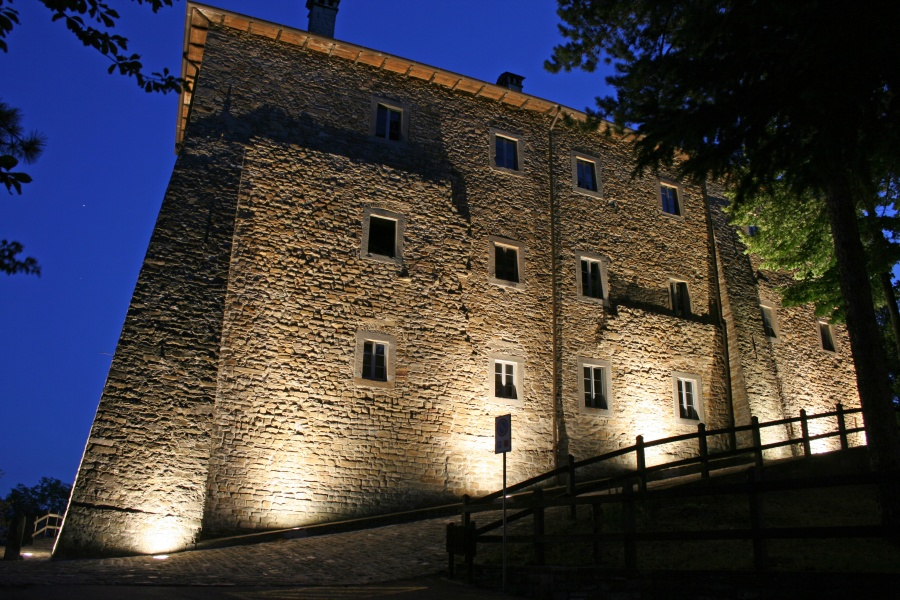
- The Rocca (castle) of Montefiorino.

- Location within Italy Location within Emilia-Romagna
- Coordinates: 44°21′N 10°37′E
- Country: Italy
- Region: Emilia-Romagna
- Province: Modena (MO)
- Frazioni: Casola, Farneta, Gusciola, La Verna, Lago, Macognano, Rubbiano, Vitriola

Government
  - Mayor: Maurizio Paladini

Area
  - Total: 45.3 km^{2} (17.5 sq mi)
- Elevation: 800 m (2,600 ft)

Population (2008)
  - Total: 2,300
  - Density: 51/km^{2} (130/sq mi)
- Demonym: montefiorinesi
- Time zone: UTC+1 (CET)
  - Summer (DST): UTC+2 (CEST)
- Postal code: 41045
- Dialing code: 0536
- Patron saint: B.V. of Loreto
- Saint day: 10 December
- Website: Official website

Montefiorino (Frignanese: Muntfiurèin) is a comune (municipality) in the Province of Modena in the Italian region Emilia-Romagna, located about 60 kilometres (37 mi) southwest of Bologna and about 40 kilometres (25 mi) southwest of Modena.

== Twin towns ==
- Carqueiranne, France

== See also ==
- Bibulca Way
