= Via Vandelli =

Historical road in the Apuan Alps

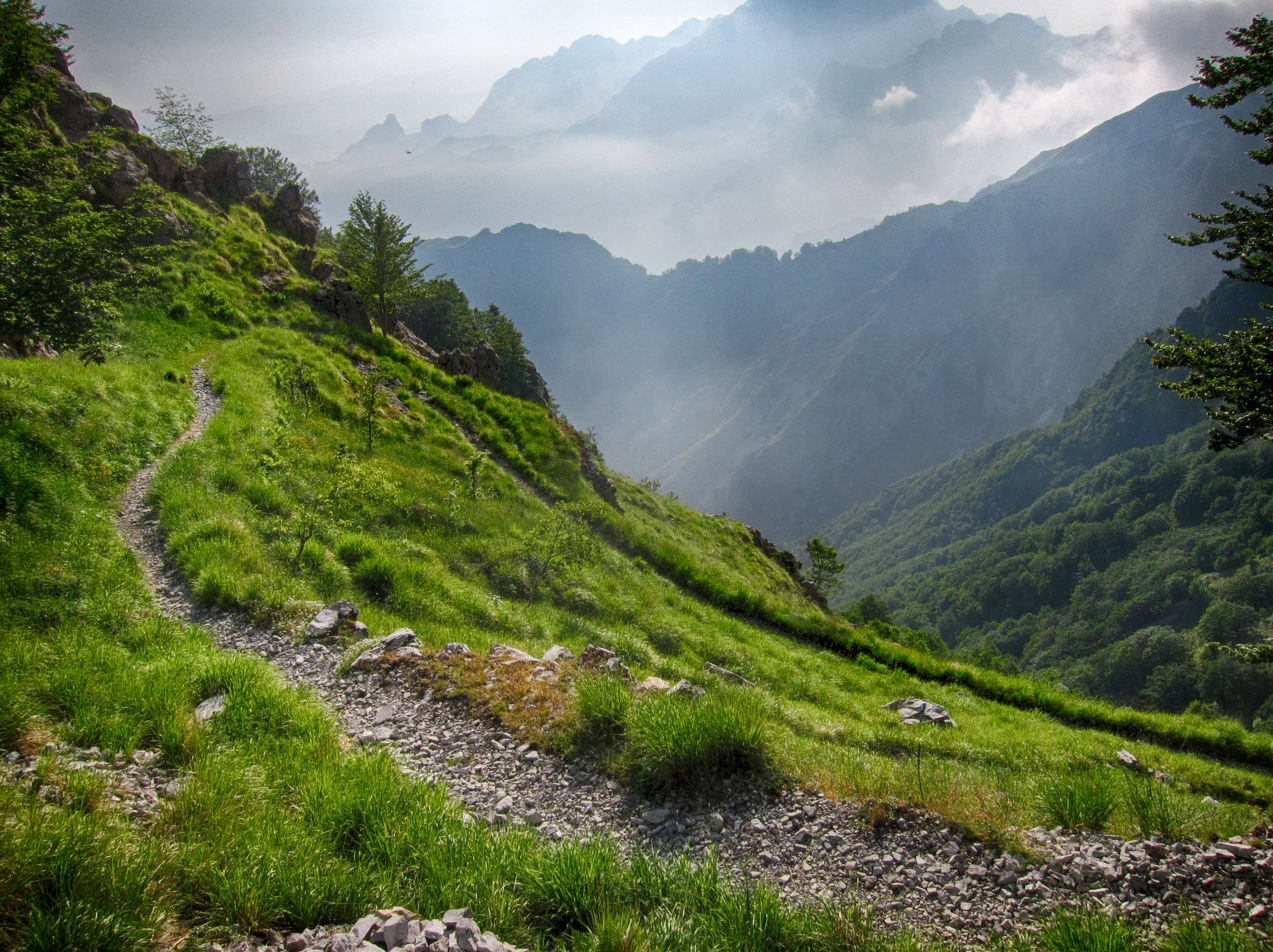
Via Vandelli and the Apuan Alps viewed from Finestra Vandelli

Via Vandelli is a historical commercial and military road, designed and built in the 18th century by Domenico Vandelli under the reign of Francesco III d'Este between 1739 and 1752. The road connected the city of Modena with the city of Massa, in its original project of 1739. In the 1750s, a variant was added, connecting Sassuolo, a residence of the Duke of Ferrara and of Modena, with the existing road from Modena to Massa. After Roman roads, Via Vandelli was the first road in Europe to be designed and realized according to a project fulfilling the customer requirements and modern engineering criteria. It is also the first road to be provided with taverns, inns and staging posts.

== History ==
Few years after Francesco III d'Este started ruling the Duchy of Modena and Reggio, he managed to agree the wedding between his son Ercole III d'Este and Maria Teresa Cybo-Malaspina, heir of the Duchy of Massa and Carrara. Joining the two Duchies, Francesco III gained again the outlet to the sea.

A safe outlet to the sea was a need for the commercial and military projects of the Este Duke. Together with the outlet a safe road was needed to connect the capital of the Duchy, Modena, with the Tyrrhenian coast. The old Roman road, Via Bibulca, was ruined and not safe and no alternative roads were available on the Este territory. For this reason, Francesco III assigned the project of a new modern road to his engineer Domenico Vandelli, who had the task to design the path of the road and to direct and supervise the construction of the road.

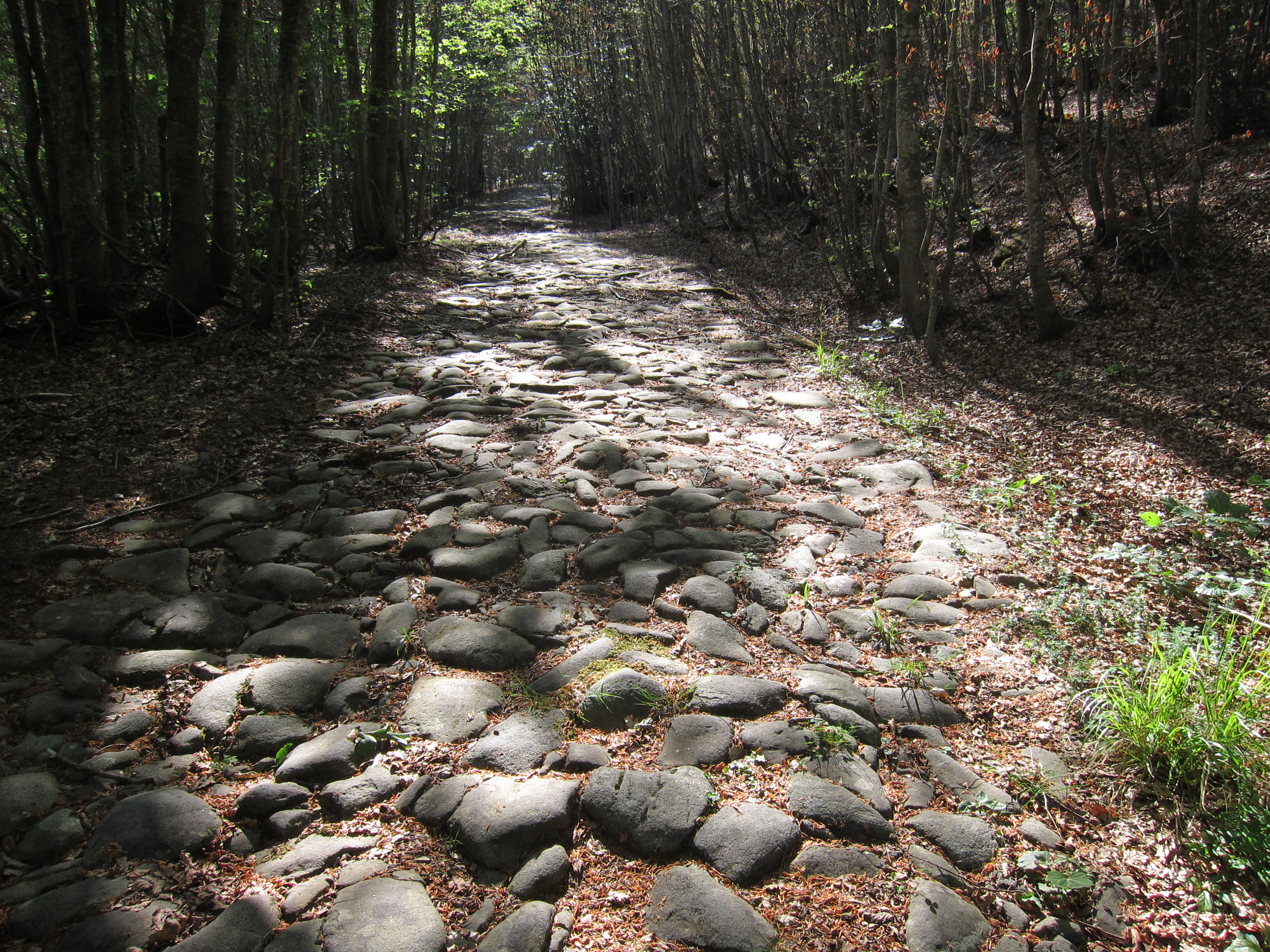
The originally paved Via Vandelli through the Selva Romanesca in Province of Modena

Francesco III imposed as requirements that the road had to be ready in short time, with a low cost, requiring few maintenance works, it had to be completely paved, without high slopes and large enough to allow for the carriage to easily move on it, with railings to protect the passage in the dangerous spots. The route had not to cross the territory of foreign reigns, such as Papal State, Republic of Lucca, Grand Duchy of Tuscany. As a general rule, the main roads had not to go through the existing towns and cities. To study the best route possible, Domenico Vandelli had to apply new mathematical models and measures to the topography that led him to draw the first map containing contour lines: the isoipsae Vandellis.

A first route was proposed in 1738. This route is following the Via Bibulca route.

The year after, 1739, a new route from Modena to Massa was proposed by Domenico Vandelli and the construction works begun. The construction was rapidly realized from Modena to Garfagnana. The road was provided with inns and staging posts all through its way, in order to allow for a safe and comfortable journey. The road had to overcome the Apennines, close to the ancient sanctuary of San Pellegrino in Alpe, above 1600m msl. During the years of the Austrian succession war, the road construction had to stop for more than 10 years and it was not possible to complete the work to reach Massa. In 1750 the construction begun again and the route was completed, overcoming also the Apuan Alps, at the Tambura Pass, above 1600m msl. This last part was the most difficult to be designed and realized, given the wilderness of the region and high slope of the mountain sides. To succeed in this part of the path, Domenico Vandelli had to use explosives to open passages on the mountain pass and to level some lay-by for the carriages, to follow the mountain side slope he had to construct dry-stone walls to support the road. In 1752, Via Vandelli was officially opened in its full length from Modena to Massa. A postal service by horse was operating regularly for years, being able to complete the trip from Modena to Massa and return in one week.

In the same years, a new road was designed and constructed by Domenico Vandelli to connect the Ducal Palace of Sassuolo with the newly opened road to Massa. Also this variant of the route is correctly known as Via Vandelli.

The constrains that were imposed to Domenico Vandelli forced him to choose difficult terrains for his road and pushed him to invent new theoretical and technical solutions that greatly improved the road construction knowledge, but on the other side, made his road to be abandoned for commercial travels in few years. The main reasons for the abandon of Via Vandelli as a carriage road were the high slopes, the cold and snowy winters, the presence of brigands in the wild parts of the road but also the appearance of even more modern roads, that could benefit from the knowledge gained during the enlightenment years and the changed political climate that allowed for inter-reign roads, as the Via Giardini, built by one of the Vandelli's fellow Pietro Giardini.

Anyhow the road continued to be used by peasants until the second world war, as a quick and easy road to move from Modena to Massa by foot.

== The itinerary ==
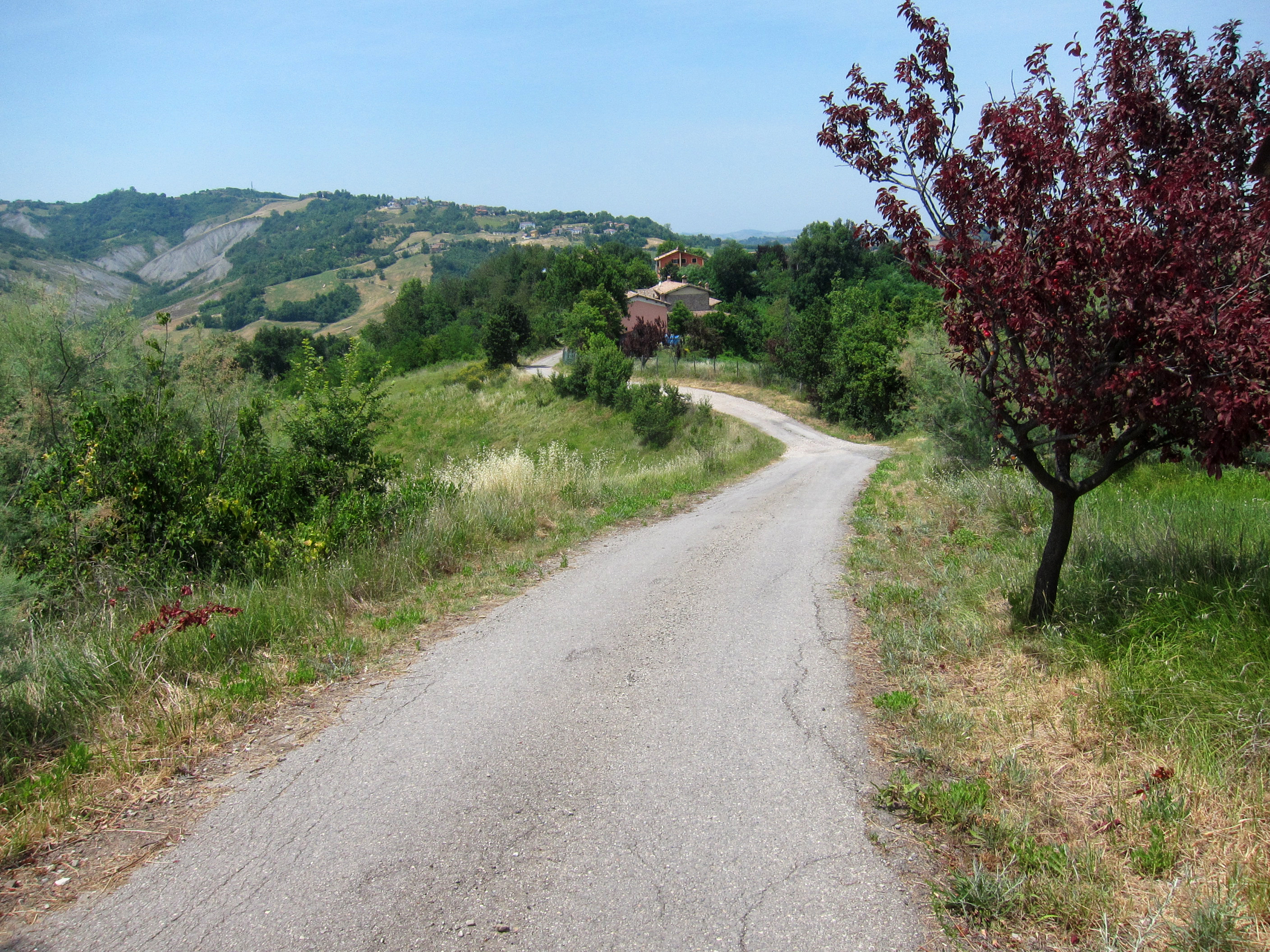
Via Vandelli on the hills in Province of Modena, close to Poggio Gaiano

The route designed and constructed in 1739 started in Modena and touches Montale, Torre Maina, San Dalmazio, Pavullo nel Frignano, Lama Mocogno, passes through the Fignola wood and close to Sasso Tignoso, reaching the Lagadello pass above 1600m msl. After that, Via Vandelli leaves the Province of Modena and enters in Tuscany at San Pellegrino in Alpe, then Campori, Castelnuovo di Garfagnana and Poggio. Here Via Vandelli starts to climb Apuan Alps, from Vagli di Sopra and Arnetola valley, Tambura pass and down to Resceto, Canevara and finally Massa.

The variant from Sassuolo, climbs the hills in province of Modena, and meets the town of Varana Sassi and Serramazzoni before joining the previous route close to Pavullo nel Frignano.

The state of the road today is well preserved in large parts. The parts preserved in its original paved path are from La Santona to San Pellegrino in Alpe (C.A.I trekking path n.579), in province of Modena, and from Vagli di Sopra to Resceto (C.A.I. trekking path n.35), in Tuscany. The rest of the path is mainly covered by heavy-traffic modern road. Some smaller portion are instead barely recognizable passing through fields and crops.

== Sources ==
- (in Italian) Maurizio Pellegrini, Fabio Massimo Pozzi, La Via Vandelli Strada Ducale del '700: I percorsi del versante emiliano, Artioli Editore (1987).
- (in Italian) Maurizio Pellegrini, Fabio Massimo Pozzi, La Via Vandelli Strada Ducale del '700: Dal Frignano alla Garfagnana e al Ducato di Massa, Artioli Editore (1989).
- (in Italian) Giulio Ferrari, La Via Vandelli: Antica strada, nuovo cammino, Edizioni Artestampa (2018).
- (in Italian) Giulio Ferrari, Guida alla Via Vandelli, Terre di mezzo Editore (2021).
