= Castiglione di Garfagnana =

- Comune
- Comune di Castiglione di Garfagnana
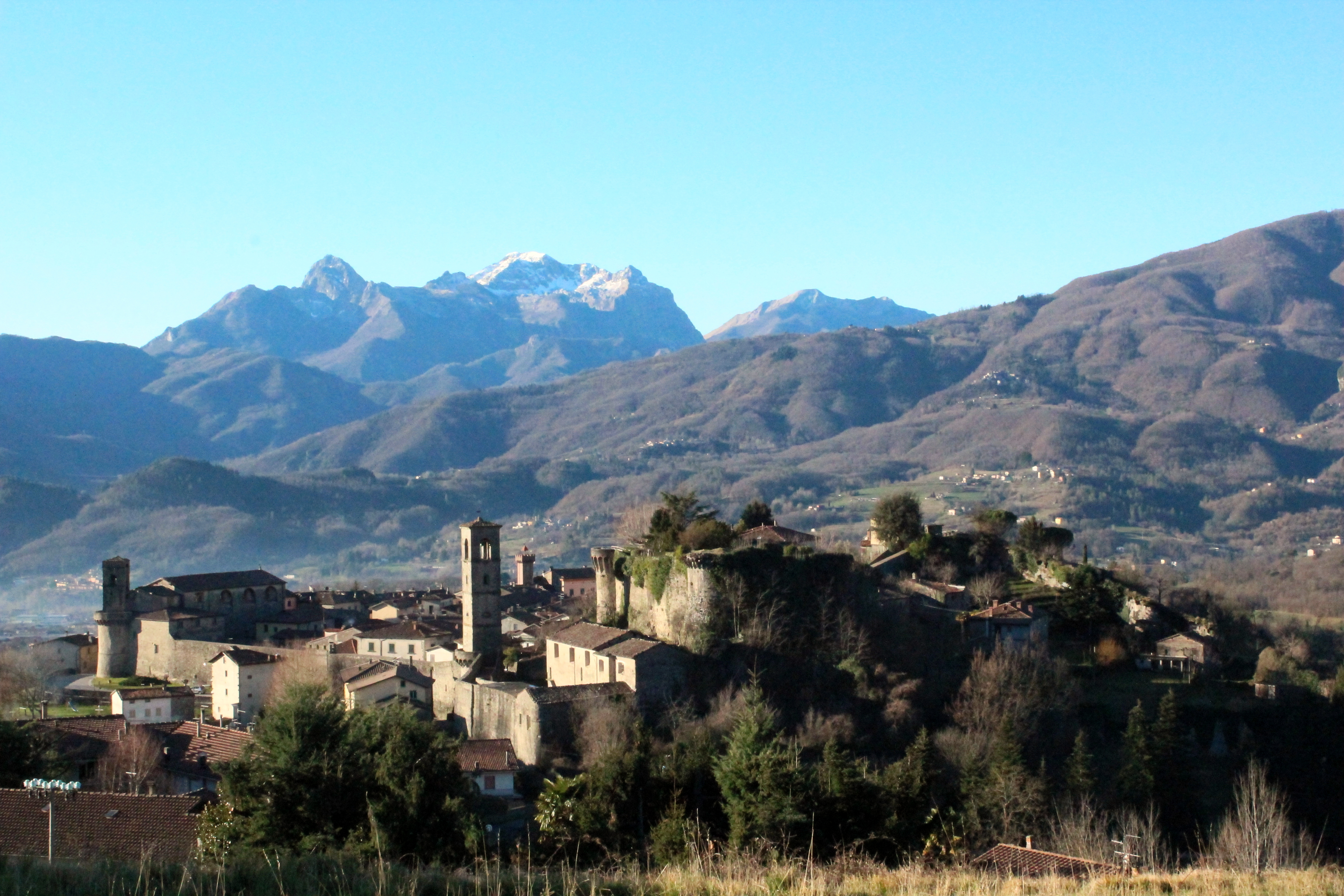

- Location within Italy Location within Tuscany
- Coordinates: 44°09′N 10°25′E
- Country: Italy
- Region: Tuscany
- Province: Lucca (LU)
- Frazioni: Boccaia, Campori, Casone di Profecchia, Cerageto, Chiozza, Col d'Arciana, Filippe, Isola, Pegaia, Passo Radici, Pian di Cerreto, Mozzanella, Pozzatelle, Prunaccio, San Pellegrino in Alpe, Valbona

Government
  - Mayor: Daniele Gaspari

Area
  - Total: 48.53 km^{2} (18.74 sq mi)
- Elevation: 545 m (1,788 ft)

Population (31 March 2017)
  - Total: 1,790
  - Density: 36.9/km^{2} (95.5/sq mi)
- Demonym: Castiglionesi
- Time zone: UTC+1 (CET)
  - Summer (DST): UTC+2 (CEST)
- Postal code: 55033
- Dialing code: 0583
- Patron saint: Madonna del Carmine
- Saint day: July 16
- Website: www.comune.castiglione-di-garfagnana.lu.it

Castiglione di Garfagnana is a medieval walled town and comune of 1,878 inhabitants in the province of Lucca. It sits on a hillside above the river Esarulo, a tributary of the Serchio.

The town is renowned for the band Filarmonica Alpina, founded in 1858 with the name of Fanfara popolare. It is one of I Borghi più belli d'Italia ("The most beautiful villages of Italy").

== History ==
The origin of the town dates back to a Roman castra, called Castrum Leonis, ("Lion's Castle"), built to command the valley that leads to the San Pellegrino Pass, the easiest access for armies over the Apennines. The fortress later developed under the Lombard and Frank dominations.

In 1170 it was besieged by the Republic of Lucca. Castiglione surrendered, but the high taxes imposed led the city to form a league with other communes of Garfagnana against Lucca.

In 1227 Castiglione was again besieged and suffered further destruction by Lucchese soldiers. Political conflicts continued in the following years, until a peace was reached in 1371: Lucca gained definitive control of Castiglione, and established a permanent administrator. The defensive structure was upgraded with the widening of the town walls.

During the 15th century Castiglione was one of the few communities in Garfagnana that did not submit to the Este family, instead remaining loyal to the Republic of Lucca. Throughout the wars against the Estensi, the fortress was again besieged, in particular in 1603 and 1613. There then followed a long period of peace, marred only by boundary disputes with the neighbouring communes.

The Congress of Vienna (1815) assigned Castiglione to Marie Louise of Bourbon, Grand Duchess of Lucca, who in 1819 gave it to Francis IV of Modena.

== Main sights ==
Castiglione's most striking attraction is the Medieval bridge built by Spinetta Malaspina in the 13th century. The town is also famous for its well-preserved 13th-century medieval walls with large towers (the Torrioni) and the castle (Rocca).

The church of San Pietro was erected in 723 by two Lombard brothers, Aurinand and Gudifrid, but was largely rebuilt in the 12th century by Bishop Guido III of Lucca. San Michele (14th century) is the other main holy building of the town. Both churches use wall towers as their belfries.

The Church of San Pellegrino (in the frazione of the same name), at 1,400 metres (4,600 ft) and commanding the valley of the Serchio river, houses the mortal remains of St. Pellegrino and St. Bianco.

The town has a panoramic vista over the valley below.

== Sister cities ==
- Isola, France, since 2010
