= Monte Cusna =

Mountain in Italy

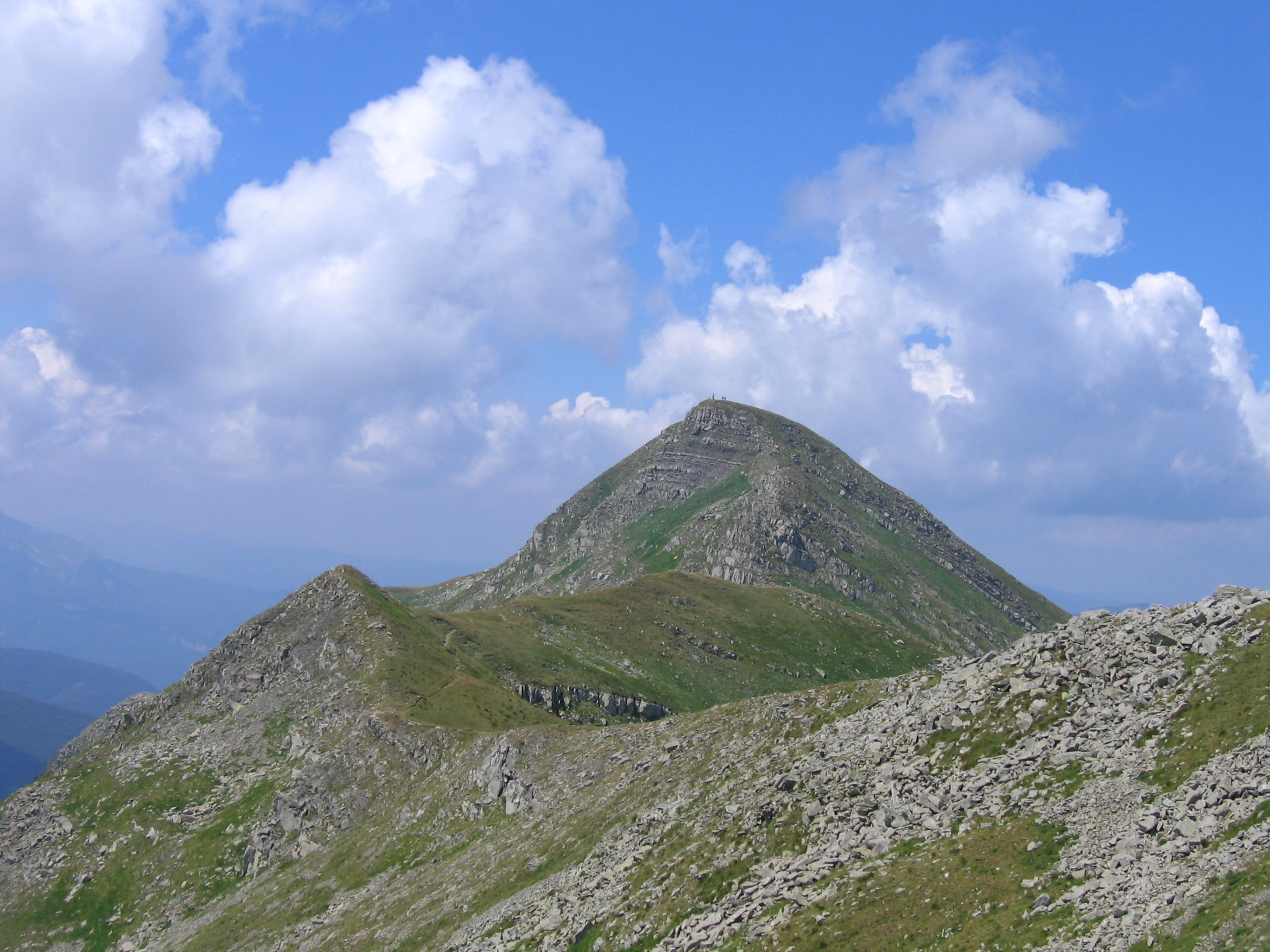
- Approaching the summit of Monte Cusna

Highest point
- Elevation: 2,120 m (6,960 ft)
- Prominence: 731
- Coordinates: 44°17′17.88″N 10°23′28.32″E

Geography
- Location within Italy
- Location: Province of Reggio Emilia, Italy
- Parent range: Tuscan-Emilian Apennines

Monte Cusna is the second highest peak in the northern Apennines after Monte Cimone.

== Geography ==
The mountain is located along the Appennino Crest Trail (A00) between Cerreto and Lagastrello Passes, with an altitude of 2,120 metres (6,960 ft). It is also known as Uomo Morto (Italian: "Dead Man"), "Uomo che Dorme" ("Sleeping Man") or "Il Gigante" ("The Giant") for its appearance, resembling a lying man.

The peak is situated in the comune of Villa Minozzo, some 3 kilometers from the boundary of Emilia Romagna with Tuscany. It contains a population of Alpine marmots, as well as, herds of semi-wild horses that graze on its slopes.

== Territory and natural attractions ==
The imposing mountain range, visible from the Po Valley, is formed by the Monte Cusna and secondary peaks of the Sasso of the Dead (2078 m) and Mount La Piella (2071 m). The mountain ridge forms the characteristic profile that resembles that of a man stretched out, said Dead Man or Giant. From the latter name is named after the protected area of the former Gigante Park, now part of the National Park of the Tuscan-Emilian Apennines. It lies to the north of the main ridge of the Apennines between Tuscany and Emilia, separated by the valley of the river Ozola.

Abetina Reale Abetina Reale is a coniferous forest that grows on the eastern side of the Cusna, on the right side of the High Valley Dolo river, and extends to the Apennine ridge. The forest is characterized by ancient specimens of white spruce survived centuries of forest exploitation.

Prati di Sara (Sara meadows) Surrounded by beech, Prati di Sara is a beautiful high moorland that stretches along the west side of the mountain, especially impressive during flowering and autumn. The name comes from a character from history and legend, a housekeeper, it is said of a concubine of the Marquis of Piolo Bernardi, who possessed Casalino from mid-seventeenth century.to the end of the eighteenth century.

Cascate del Lavacchiello The Rio Lavacchiello born near Lago del Caricatore in the area of Prati di Sara and descends along the west side of the mountain to the valley of the river Ozola. The steep slope gives rise to a series of waterfalls, spectacular especially in spring during the melting of snow and autumn.

Costa Veline On the south-west of the mountain is Costa Veline, a large forest of beech, the most important of the National Park of the Tuscan-Emilian Apennines, which preserves ancient trees.

== Hiking ==
Mount Cusna is particularly interesting from the natural point of view and has many paths and refuges:

- Rifugio Cesare Battisti (1759 m). Refuge of the Club Alpino Italiano, is located in the south-west side of the mountain near of the Lama Lite. Reachable from Civago via the path 605 through Abetina Reale, from Pian Vallese (Febbio) via the path 607 of the Passone or via the path 629 Valley dell'Ozola (Ligonchio).
- Rifugio Bargetana (1740 m), is located on the 633 trail near the lake at the foot of Monte Prado.
- Rifugio Segheria (1410 m). Place in the middle reach of the Abetina Reale, Civago with trail 605.
- Rifugio S. Leonardo (1240 m). Restored ancient hospital of the twelfth century. It is located on Dolo river, on the path between 605A Abetina Reale, Civago.
- Rifugio Monte Orsaro (1300 m). It is located in Monte Orsaro and can be reached by car. Starting point for hiking and Mount Cusna and mountains Prampa and CISA.
- Rifugio Peschiera Zamboni (1151 m). Place in Ronco Pianigi near Febbio can be reached by car. Starting point of the path 617 for Mount Cusna.

== Skiing ==
On the north side of the mountain the resort of Febbio is equipped for alpine skiing, snowboarding and cross country skiing.
