= Villa Minozzo =

- Comune
- Comune di Villa Minozzo
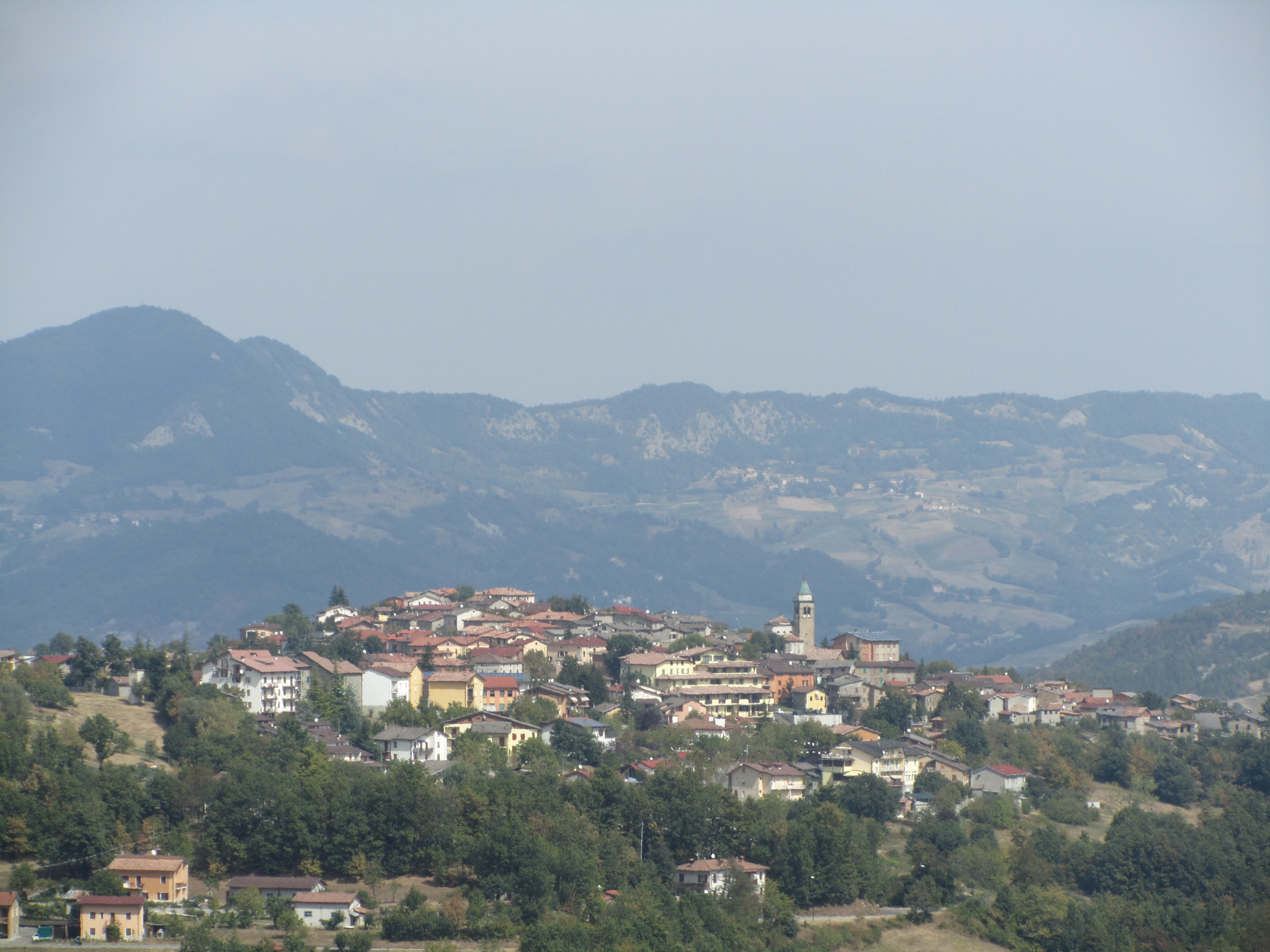
- View of Villa Minozzo

- Location within Italy Location within Emilia-Romagna
- Coordinates: 44°22′N 10°27′E
- Country: Italy
- Region: Emilia-Romagna
- Province: Reggio Emilia (RE)
- Frazioni: Asta, Carniana, Carù, Case Zobbi, Cerrè Sologno, Cervarolo, Civago, Coriano, Costabona, Febbio, Gazzano, Gova, La Rocca, Lusignana, Minozzo, Morsiano, Monteorsaro, Novellano, Poiano, Primaore, Razzolo, Santonio, Secchio, Sologno, Tizzola

Government
  - Mayor: Elio Ivo Sassi

Area
  - Total: 167.9 km^{2} (64.8 sq mi)
- Elevation: 684 m (2,244 ft)

Population (31 December 2017)
  - Total: 3,658
  - Density: 21.79/km^{2} (56.43/sq mi)
- Time zone: UTC+1 (CET)
  - Summer (DST): UTC+2 (CEST)
- Postal code: 42030
- Dialing code: 0522
- Patron saint: Santi Quirico and Giulitta
- Saint day: 15 July
- Website: Official website

Villa Minozzo (Reggiano: La Vìla da Mnòcc) is a comune (municipality) in the Province of Reggio Emilia in the Italian region Emilia-Romagna, located about 70 kilometres (43 mi) west of Bologna and about 40 kilometres (25 mi) southwest of Reggio Emilia.

== Geography ==
Its territory includes the ski resort of Febbio and the highest peak in the province, Monte Cusna at 2,121 metres (6,959 ft) above sea level. Through the frazione of Civago and the Forbici Pass, elevation 1,574 metres (5,164 ft), the Garfagana can be reached.

== See also ==
- Morsiano
