= Farneta =

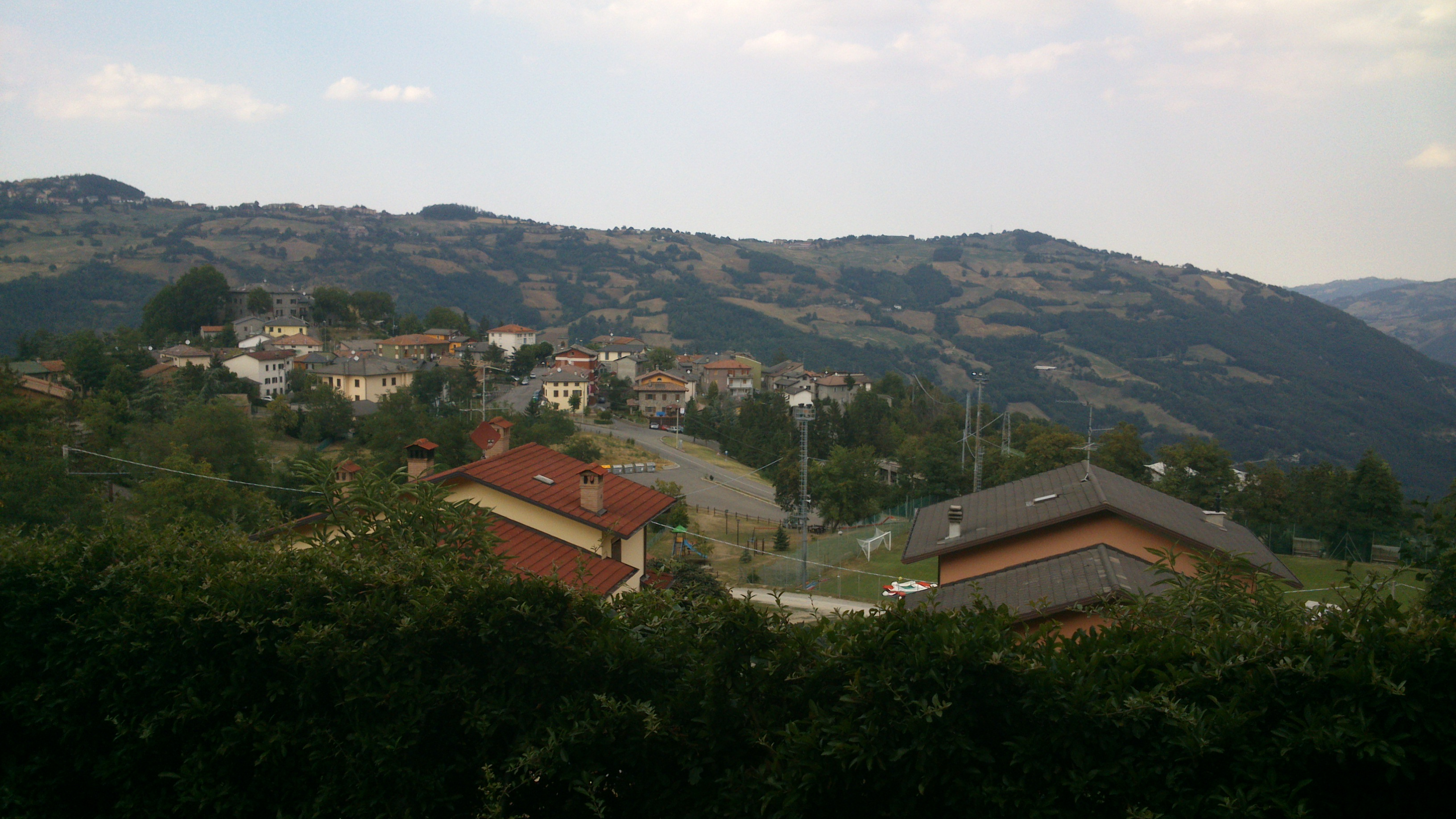
- Interactive map of Farneta
- Coordinates: 44°21′04″N 10°34′15″E
- Region: Emilia-Romagna
- Province: Modena
- Comune: Montefiorino

Area
  - Total: 8 km^{2} (3.1 sq mi)
- Elevation: 700 m (2,300 ft)

Population (2001)
- 214 inhabitants
- Demonym: farnetani
- Postcode: 41045
- Area code: 0536
- Telephone: +0039 0536
- Website: comune.montefiorino.mo.it

Farneta is a frazione of the comune of Montefiorino, Italy, located in the Apennines of the province of Modena.

Located between the two hamlets of Gusciola (c. 2 km distant) and Romanoro (c. 7 km), the town in subdivided in four divisions: I Boschi, Il Monte, Il Castello and La Chiesa that since the Middle Ages battle themselves in the so-called "district games".
