= Sant'Antonino (disambiguation) =

Sant'Antonino is a municipality in the district of Bellinzona, Ticino, Switzerland.

Sant'Antonino may also refer to:

- Sant'Antonino, Haute-Corse, France, on the island of Corsica
- Sant'Antonino di Susa, Turin, Piedmont, Italy

== See also ==
- Antoniana (disambiguation)
- Antoniano (disambiguation)
- Antonino (disambiguation)
- Sant'Antonio (disambiguation)
- Sant'Antonino Martire, Quattro Castella, church in Emilia Romagna, Italy
