= Sant'Antonio Abate (disambiguation) =

Sant'Antonio Abate is a commune in the Metropolitan City of Naples in the Italian region Campania.

Sant'Antonio Abate may also refer to:

- Anthony the Great, a Christian monk and saint from Egypt
- Sant'Antonio Abate, Breno, a church in province of Brescia, Lombardy
- Sant'Antonio Abate, Erice, a church in Erice, Sicily
- Sant'Antonio Abate, Francofonte, a church in province of Syracuse, Sicily
- Sant'Antonio Abate, Milan, a church in Milan, Lombardy
- Sant'Antonio Abate, Naples, a church in Naples, Campania
- Sant'Antonio Abate, Parma, a church in Parma, Emilia-Romagna
- Sant'Antonio Abate, Pisa, a church in Pisa, Tuscany
- Sant'Antonio Abate all'Esquilino, a church in Rome, Lazio

== See also ==
- Abate (disambiguation)
- Sant'Antonio (disambiguation)
- San Antonio Abad (disambiguation)
