= Antoniadi (disambiguation) =

E. M. Antoniadi (1810–1944) was a Greek-French astronomer.

Antoniadi may also refer to:

- Antoniadi (lunar crater)
- Antoniadi (Martian crater)
- Antoniadi scale, a weather condition system
- Antoniadi Dorsum, a wrinkle ridge on Mercury

== See also ==
- Antoniadis
- Antoniani
