= Antoniano (name) =

Antoniano is an Italian surname. Notable people with this name include the following:

- Giovanni Antoniano (died 1588), Dutch patristic scholar
- Silvio Antoniano (1540–1603), Italian cardinal

== See also ==
- Antoniano (disambiguation)
- Antoniani
- Antonino (name)
