= San Antonio Abad =

San Antonio Abad may refer to

- Anthony the Great (251–356), or San Antonio Abad, a Christian monk and saint from Egypt
- San Antonio Abad, Cartagena, a district in Cartagena, Spain
- San Antonio Abad metro station, a Mexico City Metro station
- San Antonio Abad National University in Cusco, a public university in Cusco, Peru
- Fort San Antonio Abad, a fortification in the Malate district of the City of Manila, Philippines

== See also ==
- Antonio Abad
- Sant'Antonio (disambiguation)
- Sant'Antonio Abate (disambiguation)
