= Antoniadis =

Antoniadis or Antoniades (Greek: Αντωνιάδης, romanized: Antōniadēs, phonetically Antoniádhis) is a Greek surname. The female version of the name is Antoniadou (Αντωνιάδου) or Antoniadi (Αντωνιάδη). Antoniadis is a patronymic surname which literally means "the child of Antonis". Notable examples include:

- Antonios Antoniadis (born 1946), Greek medical professor
- Antonis Antoniadis (born 1946), Greek footballer
- Antonis Antoniadis (admiral) (born 1946), Greek naval officer
- Dimitrios Antoniadis (born 1992), Greek cyclist
- Eleni Antoniadou (born 1988), Greek public figure
- Emmanouil Antoniadis (1791–1863), Greek revolutionary
- Ignatios Antoniadis (born 1955), Greek theoretical physicist
- John Antoniadis (born 1986), Greek astrophysicist
- Marios Antoniadis (born 1990), Cypriot footballer
- Nikolaos Antoniadis (born 1971), Greek sport shooter
- Pantelis Antoniadis (born 1994), Greek footballer
- Praxoula Antoniadou (born 1958), Cypriot politician

== See also ==
- Antoniades
- Antoniadi (disambiguation)
- Antoniadou
