= Antoniades =

Antoniades is a Greek surname (similar to Antoniadis and the female versions Antoniadou and Antoniadi). The name is derived from the root name Antonius. Notable people with the name include the following:

- Constantin Antoniades (1891–1975), Swiss fencer
- Marios Antoniades (born 1990), Cypriot footballer

== See also ==
- Constantin Antoniade (1880–1954), Romanian jurist and writer
- Antoniades v Villiers
