= Antonino =

Antonino may refer to:

- Antonino (name), a given name and a surname (including a list of people with the name)
- Antonino, Kansas, an unincorporated community in Ellis County, Kansas, United States

== See also ==
- Antoniano (disambiguation)
- Antoñito (disambiguation)
- San Antonino (disambiguation)
- Sant'Antonino (disambiguation)
