= Antonioli =

Antonioli is an Italian surname. Notable people with the surname include:

- Claudio Antonioli (born 1962), retired Italian racing driver
- Dan Antonioli (born 1960), builder and owner of two evolving intentional communities
- Fausto Antonioli (1814–1882), Italian painter
- Francesco Antonioli (born 1969), Italian footballer and goalkeeper
- Jean-François Antonioli (born 1959), Swiss pianist, conductor and piano pedagogue
- Laurie Antonioli (born 1958), American jazz singer and record producer
- Michele Antonioli (born 1977), Italian short track speed skater
- Robert Antonioli (born 1990), Italian ski mountaineer
- Roberto Antonioli (born c. 1922), Italian rugby union and professional rugby league footballer

== See also ==
- Antonioni (surname)
- Tonioli
