= Maurizia Barazzoni =

Italian singer

Maurizia Barazzoni (born 1955 in Bibbiano) is an Italian soprano.

She graduated from the Bologna Conservatory in operatic singing with full marks. She won the Festival Caccini Recitar Cantando contest. She has interpreted most of the Italian Baroque composers and among many recordings is the complete madrigals and arias of Giulio Caccini. She is to be heard on the soundtrack of the 1996 film The Portrait of a Lady.

She is the author of Metodo di Canto Italiano dal 'Recitar cantando' a Rossini (Method of Italian Singing from 'Recitar cantando' to Rossini).

== Biography ==
She graduated from the Bologna Conservatory in opera singing with top marks. She won the Caccini Recitar cantando Festival competition. He has performed various roles in Italian Baroque operas, and his recordings include Giulio Caccini complete Madrigal and arias. She sang on the Soundtrack of the 1996 film The Portrait of a Lady (film).

She is the author of the Italian Singing Method from ‘Recitar cantando’ to Rossini.
