= Sant'Antonio =

Sant'Antonio, Italian for Saint Anthony, most often refers to places named after Saint Anthony of Padua or Sant'Antonio Abate:

== Places ==
=== Switzerland ===
- Sant'Antonio, Bellinzona, municipality in canton of Ticino
- Sant'Antonio (Poschiavo), civil parish of Poschiavo, in canton of Graubünden
- St. Antönien, municipality in canton of Graubünden
- St. Antönien Ascharina (or Ascharina), civil parish of St. Antönien, in canton of Graubünden

=== Italy ===
==== Churches in Italy ====
- Basilica di Sant'Antonio di Padova, basilica church and major shrine in Padua, Veneto
- Sant'Antonio di Padova a Circonvallazione Appia, church in Rome, Lazio
- Sant'Antonio, church in Faenza, province of Ravenna, Emilia-Romagna
- Sant'Antonio in Polesine, convent in Ferrara, Emilia-Romagna
- Sant'Antonio da Padova in Via Merulana, minor basilica church in Rome, Lazio
- Sant'Antonio da Padova in Via Tuscolana, church in Rome, Lazio
- Sant'Antonio dei Portoghesi, church in Rome, Lazio
- Sant'Antonio da Padova, oratory in Siena, Tuscany
- Sant'Antonio di Ranverso, abbey in Buttigliera Alta, province of Turin, Piedmont
- Sant'Antonio, Vaglio Basilicata, church in region of Basilicata

==== Municipalities (Comuni) ====
- Aci Sant'Antonio, in province of Catania
- Isola Sant'Antonio, in province of Alessandria
- Rocchetta Sant'Antonio, in province of Foggia
- Sant'Antonio Abate, in province of Naples
- Sant'Antonio di Gallura, in province of Olbia-Tempio
- Villa Sant'Antonio, in province of Oristano

==== Civil parishes (Frazioni) ====
Abruzzo

- Colle Sant'Antonio, in Bucchianico (CH)
- Ponte Sant'Antonio, in Penne (PE)
- Sant'Antonio, in Gamberale (CH)
- Sant'Antonio Abate, in Vasto (CH)
- Sant'Antonio Bosco, in Pescocostanzo (AQ)

Apulia

- Sant'Antonio d'Ascuola, in Monopoli (BA)

Basilicata

- Sant'Antonio Casalini, in Bella (PZ)

Calabria

- Sant'Antonio, in Cleto (CS)
- Sant'Antonio, in Gioiosa Ionica (RC)
- Sant'Antonio, in Motta San Giovanni (RC)

Campania

- Borgo Sant'Antonio Abate, in Pietravairano (CE)
- Sant'Antonio, in Apice (BN)
- Sant'Antonio, in Sala Consilina (SA)
- Sant'Antonio, in Torchiara (SA)
- Sant'Antonio a Picenzia, in Pontecagnano (SA)

Emilia-Romagna

- Sant'Antonio, in Castell'Arquato (PC)
- Sant'Antonio, in Medicina (BO)
- Sant'Antonio, in Ravenna (RA)
- Sant'Antonio a Trebbia, in Piacenza (PC)
- Sant'Antonio di Crocette, in Pavullo nel Frignano (MO)
- Sant'Antonio in Gualdo, in Castrocaro Terme (FC)
- Sant'Antonio in Mercadello, in Novi di Modena (MO)

Friuli-Venezia Giulia

- Sant'Antonio, in Porcia (PN)
- Sant'Antonio, in Tarvisio (UD)
- Sant'Antonio in Bosco, in San Dorligo della Valle (TS)

Lazio

- Sant'Antonio, in Guidonia Montecelio (RM)
- Sant'Antonio, in Torrice (FR)
- Sant'Antonio Abate, in Castelnuovo Parano (FR)
- Sant'Antonio Casilina Nord, in Ferentino (FR)

Liguria

- Sant'Antonio, in Levanto (SP)
- Sant'Antonio, in Ventimiglia (IM)

Marche

- Borgo Sant'Antonio, in Visso (MC)
- Sant'Antonio, in Folignano (AP)
- Villa Sant'Antonio (AP), in Ascoli Piceno and Castel di Lama (AP)

Lombardy

- Sant'Antonio, in Grone (BG)
- Sant'Antonio, in Montichiari (BS)
- Sant'Antonio, in Porto Mantovano (MN)
- Sant'Antonio, in Tartano (SO)
- Sant'Antonio, in Valfurva (SO)
- Sant'Antonio Abbandonato, in Brembilla (BG)
- Sant'Antonio d'Adda, in Caprino Bergamasco (BG)
- Sant'Antonio Morignone, in Valdisotto (SO)

Piedmont

- Borgo Sant'Antonio, in Santa Vittoria d'Alba (CN)
- Sant'Antonio, in Basaluzzo (AL)
- Sant'Antonio, in Canelli (AT)
- Sant'Antonio, in Castellamonte (TO)
- Sant'Antonio, in Cavour (TO)
- Sant'Antonio, in Fontaneto d'Agogna (NO)
- Sant'Antonio, in Magliano Alfieri (CN)
- Sant'Antonio, in Marsaglia (CN)
- Sant'Antonio, in Monticello d'Alba (CN)
- Sant'Antonio, in Odalengo Grande (AL)
- Sant'Antonio, in Villafranca d'Asti (AT)
- Sant'Antonio Aradolo, in Borgo San Dalmazzo (CN)
- Sant'Antonio Baligio, in Fossano (CN)
- Sant'Antonio Casa Morca, in Riva Valdobbia (VC)

Sardinia

- Sant'Antonio di Santadi, in Arbus (VS)

Sicily

- Sant'Antonio, in Barcellona Pozzo di Gotto (ME)
- Sant'Antonio, in Modica (RG)

Trentino-Alto Adige

- Sant'Antonio di Mavignola, in Pinzolo (TN)

Tuscany

- Alpe di Sant'Antonio, in Molazzana (LU)
- Cerreta Sant'Antonio, in Seravezza (LU)
- Sant'Antonio, in Campagnatico (GR)
- Sant'Antonio, in Carrara (MS)

Umbria

- Casali Sant'Antonio, in Cascia (PG)
- Sant'Antonio di Rasina, in Gualdo Tadino (PG)

Veneto

- Sant'Antonio, in Thiene (VI)
- Sant'Antonio, in Valli del Pasubio (VI)
- Sant'Antonio Tortal, in Trichiana (BL)
- Villanova Sant'Antonio, in Fossalta di Portogruaro (VE)

== See also ==
- San Antonio (disambiguation)
- Santo Antônio (disambiguation)
- Saint Anthony (disambiguation)
- Sant'Antonino (disambiguation)
