= Antonioni (surname) =

Antonioni is an Italian surname. Notable people with this surname include:

- Enrica Antonioni (born 1952), Italian actress and film director, the widow of Michelangelo Antonioni
- Michelangelo Antonioni (1912–2007), Italian film director and writer
- Robert A. Antonioni (born 1958), American attorney and politician

== See also ==
- Antoniani
- Antonioli
- Antonini (name)
- Tonioli
