= Quattro Castella =

- Comune
- Comune di Quattro Castella
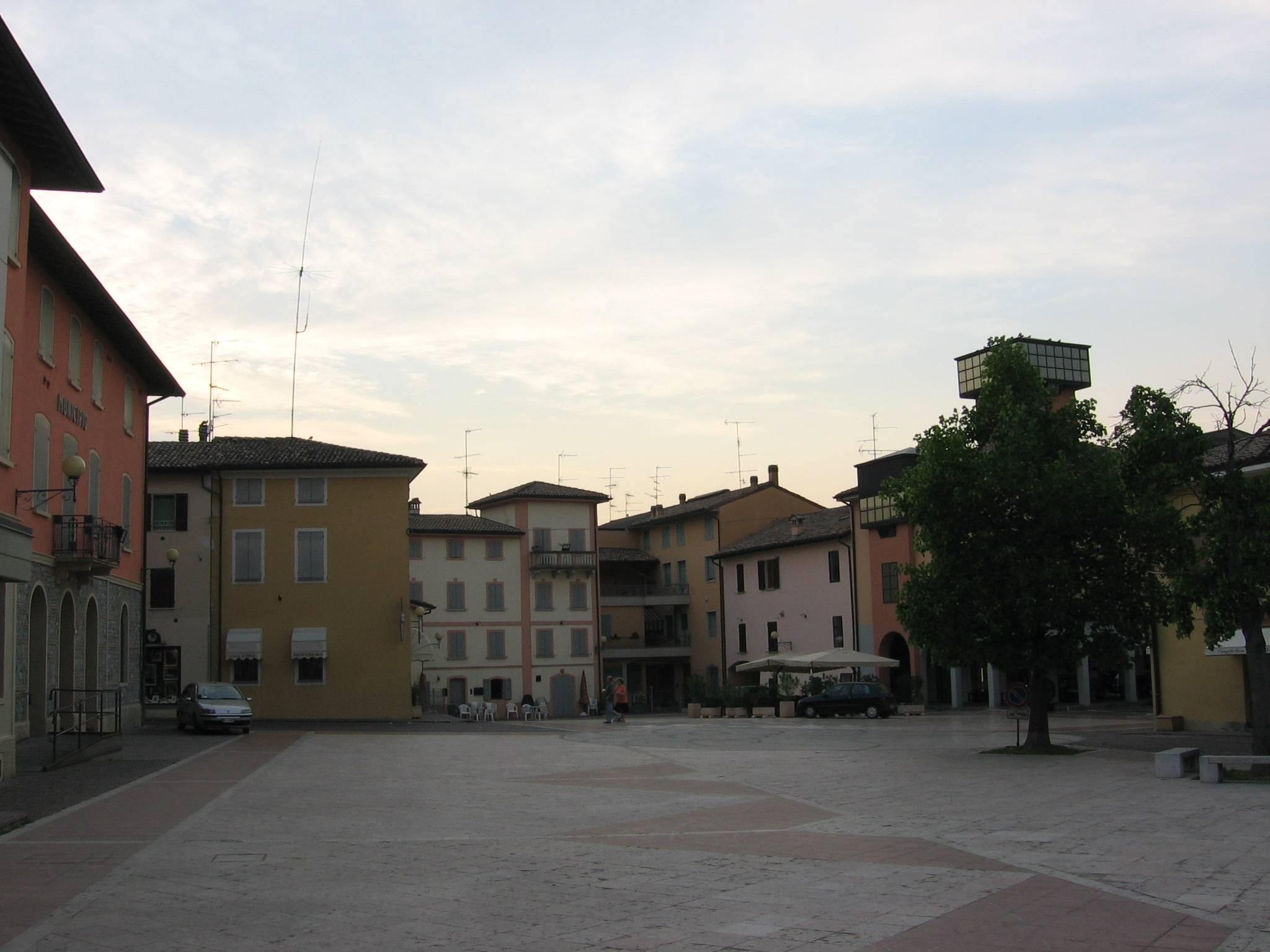
- Entrance to Quattro Castella

- Coat of arms

- Location within Italy Location within Emilia-Romagna
- Coordinates: 44°38′N 10°28′E
- Country: Italy
- Region: Emilia-Romagna
- Province: Reggio Emilia (RE)
- Frazioni: Bedogno, Bosco, Braglie, Ca' Fornace, Calinzano, Casa Valle, Forche, La Fornace, Mangallana, Montecavolo, Orologia, Pamperduto, Piazza Navona, Puianello, Roncolo, Rubbianino, Salvarano, Scampate, Selvarola

Government
  - Mayor: Alberto Olmi (Democratica Bene Comune)

Area
  - Total: 46.31 km^{2} (17.88 sq mi)
- Elevation: 160 m (520 ft)

Population (31 December 2023)
  - Total: 13,238
  - Density: 285.9/km^{2} (740.4/sq mi)
- Demonym: Castellesi
- Time zone: UTC+1 (CET)
  - Summer (DST): UTC+2 (CEST)
- Postal code: 42020
- Dialing code: 0522
- Patron saint: St. Antoninus
- Saint day: September 17
- Website: Official website

Quattro Castella (Reggiano: I Quâter Castē) is a comune (municipality) in the Province of Reggio Emilia in the Italian region Emilia-Romagna, located in the Terre di Canossa, about 70 kilometres (43 mi) west of Bologna and about 15 kilometres (9 mi) southwest of Reggio Emilia.

Quattro Castella borders the following municipalities: Albinea, Bibbiano, Reggio Emilia, San Polo d'Enza, Vezzano sul Crostolo.

Two of its churches include Sant'Antonino Martire in town; and the Oratory of the Madonna della Battaglia outside of the town.

Quattro Castella is home to the Castello di Bianello, the only remaining intact castle of the four castles giving it its name.

Every year in May the town hosts the famous Corteo storico matildico, which commemorates the restoration of the feudal rights of Matilde of Canossa by Henry V, Holy Roman Emperor. The scene is reinacted by famous actors in the leading roles, along with hundreds of others in medieval costumes.

== Twin towns ==
Quattro Castella is twinned with:

- Buzet, Croatia, since 1978
- Weilburg, Germany, since 2002
