= Antoniana =

Antoniana may refer to the following:

- Juventud Antoniana, Argentine football club
- Rudolph-Antoniana, German knight academy
- Antoniana Margarita, a scientific text by 16th-century Spanish philosopher Gómez Pereira
- Banca Antoniana, one of the Italian banks that merged to form Banca Antonveneta

== See also ==
- Antoniani
- Antoniano (disambiguation)
