= Toniolo =

Toniolo is a family name of Italian origin. Notable people with the surname include:

- Deborah Toniolo (born 1977), Italian long-distance runner
- Edoardo Toniolo (1907–1986), Italian actor
- Giuseppe Toniolo (1845–1918), Italian Catholic economist and sociologist
- Leopoldo Toniolo (1833–1908), Italian painter

== See also ==
- Tonioli
