= Francofonte =

- Comune
- Comune di Francofonte
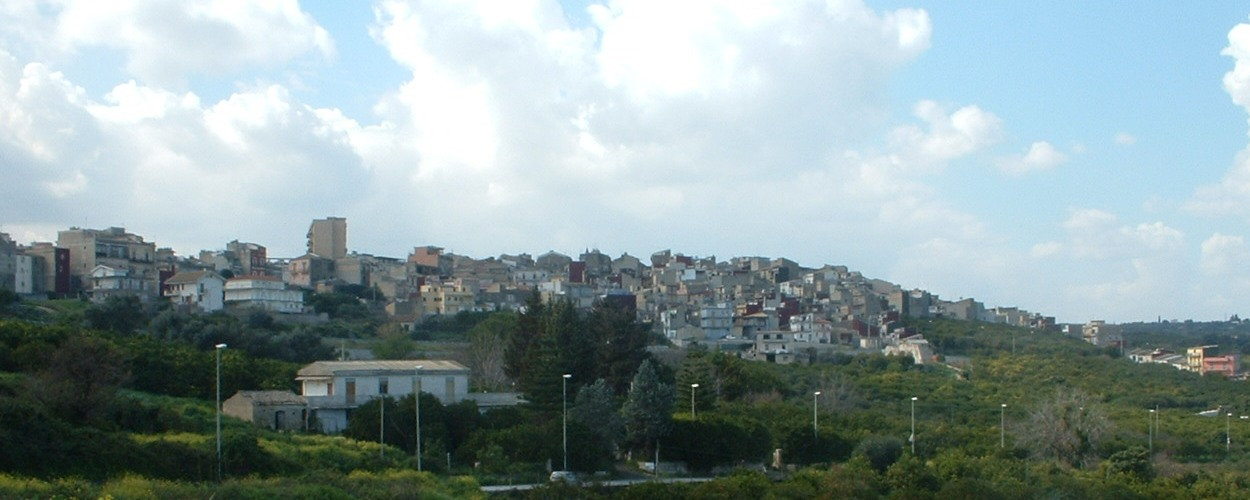

- Coat of arms

- Location within Italy Location within Sicily
- Coordinates: 37°14′N 14°53′E
- Country: Italy
- Region: Sicily
- Province: Syracuse (SR)

Government
  - Mayor: Daniele Nunzio Lentini

Area
  - Total: 74.2 km^{2} (28.6 sq mi)
- Elevation: 281 m (922 ft)

Population (30 November 2017)
  - Total: 12,669
  - Density: 171/km^{2} (442/sq mi)
- Demonym: Francofontesi
- Time zone: UTC+1 (CET)
  - Summer (DST): UTC+2 (CEST)
- Postal code: 96015
- Dialing code: 095
- Patron saint: Madonna della Neve
- Saint day: 5 August
- Website: Official website

Francofonte (Sicilian: Francufonti) is a comune (municipality) in the Province of Syracuse, Sicily, southern Italy, located about 170 kilometres (110 mi) southeast of Palermo and about 40 kilometres (25 mi) northwest of Syracuse.

Francofonte borders the following municipalities: Buccheri, Carlentini, Lentini, Militello in Val di Catania, Scordia, Vizzini.

The Patron Saint of the town is the Madonna della Neve on August the 5th. The largest church is the chiesa madre Sant'Antonio Abate.
