= Antoniani =

Antoniani is a surname. Notable people with this name include the following:

- Pietro Antoniani (c. 1740–1805), Italian painter
- Silvio Antoniani, also referred to as Silvio Antoniano, (1540–1603), Italian Roman Catholic cardinal

== See also ==
- Antoniadi (disambiguation)
- Antoniano (disambiguation)
- Antonini (name)
- Antonioni (surname)
