= San Polo d'Enza =

- Comune
- Comune di San Polo d'Enza
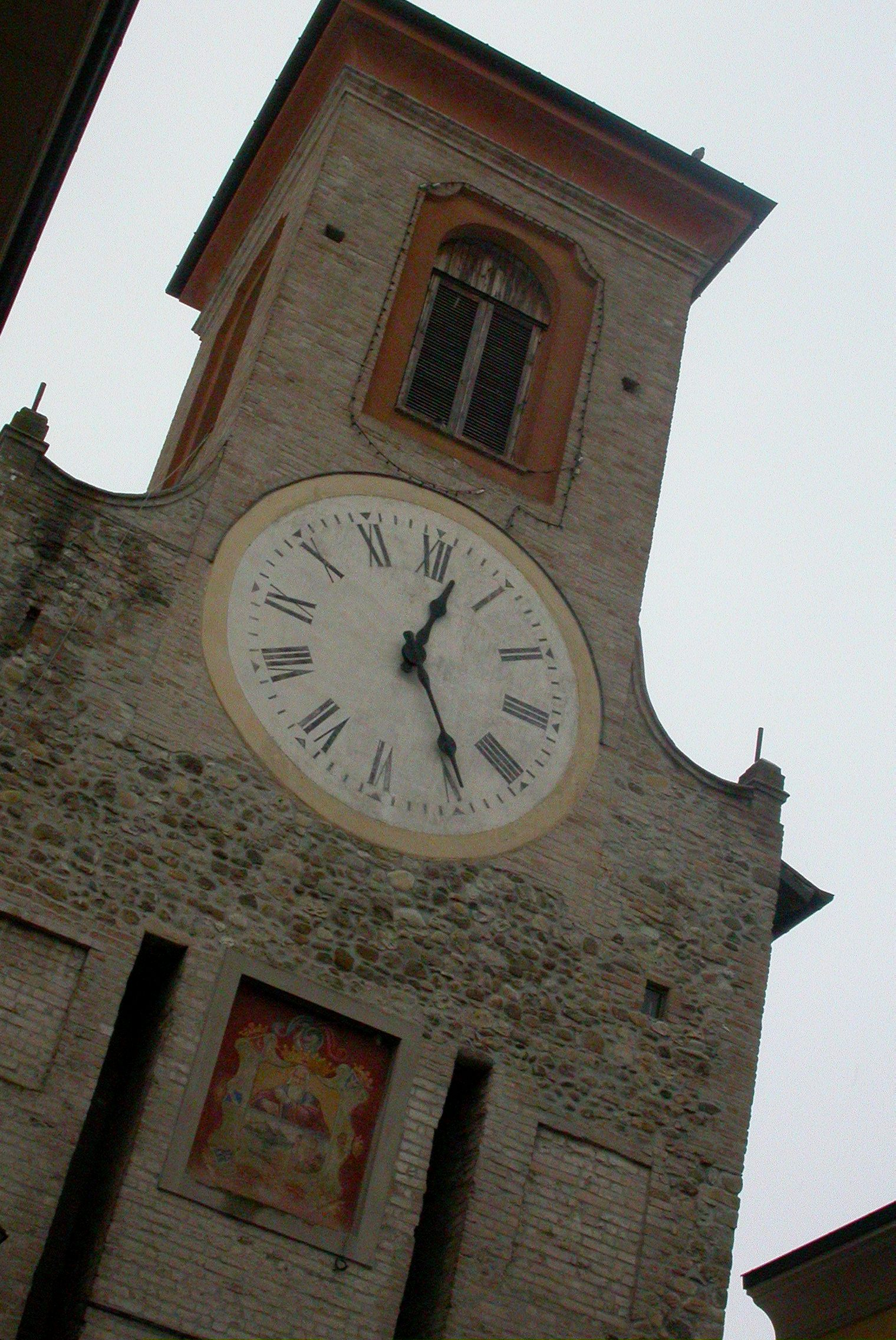
- San Polo d'Enza

- Location within Italy Location within Emilia-Romagna
- Coordinates: 44°38′N 10°26′E
- Country: Italy
- Region: Emilia-Romagna
- Province: Reggio Emilia (RE)
- Frazioni: Barcaccia, Belvedere, Bonini, Borsea, Bosi, Ca'Bianca, Casa Bertolini, Casa Farini, Case dell'Eva, Colombarone, Contea Orlandini, Cornacchia, Ghilga, Grassano Alto, Grassano Basso, Grassano Chiesa, Grassano est, Grassano Ovest, Grassano Scuola, Paperopoli, Pezzano, Pietre, Pieve, Pontenovo, Rio Luceria, Rio delle Amazzoni, Sedignano, Sessanta, Stradella

Government
  - Mayor: Franco Palù

Area
  - Total: 32.29 km^{2} (12.47 sq mi)
- Elevation: 174 m (571 ft)

Population (31 July 2018)
  - Total: 6,212
  - Density: 192.4/km^{2} (498.3/sq mi)
- Demonym: Sampolesi
- Time zone: UTC+1 (CET)
  - Summer (DST): UTC+2 (CEST)
- Postal code: 42020
- Dialing code: 0522
- Patron saint: St. Paul
- Website: Official website

San Polo d'Enza (Reggiano: Sân Pôl) is a comune (municipality) in the Emilia-Romagna region of Northern Italy, located about 70 kilometres (43 mi) west of Bologna and about 20 kilometres (12 mi) southwest of Reggio Emilia. San Polo d'Enza borders the following municipalities: Bibbiano, Canossa, Montecchio Emilia, Montechiarugolo, Quattro Castella, Traversetolo, Vezzano sul Crostolo.

== People ==
- Giovanni Guicciardi, Italian opera singer
