= Telti =

- Comune
- Comune di Telti
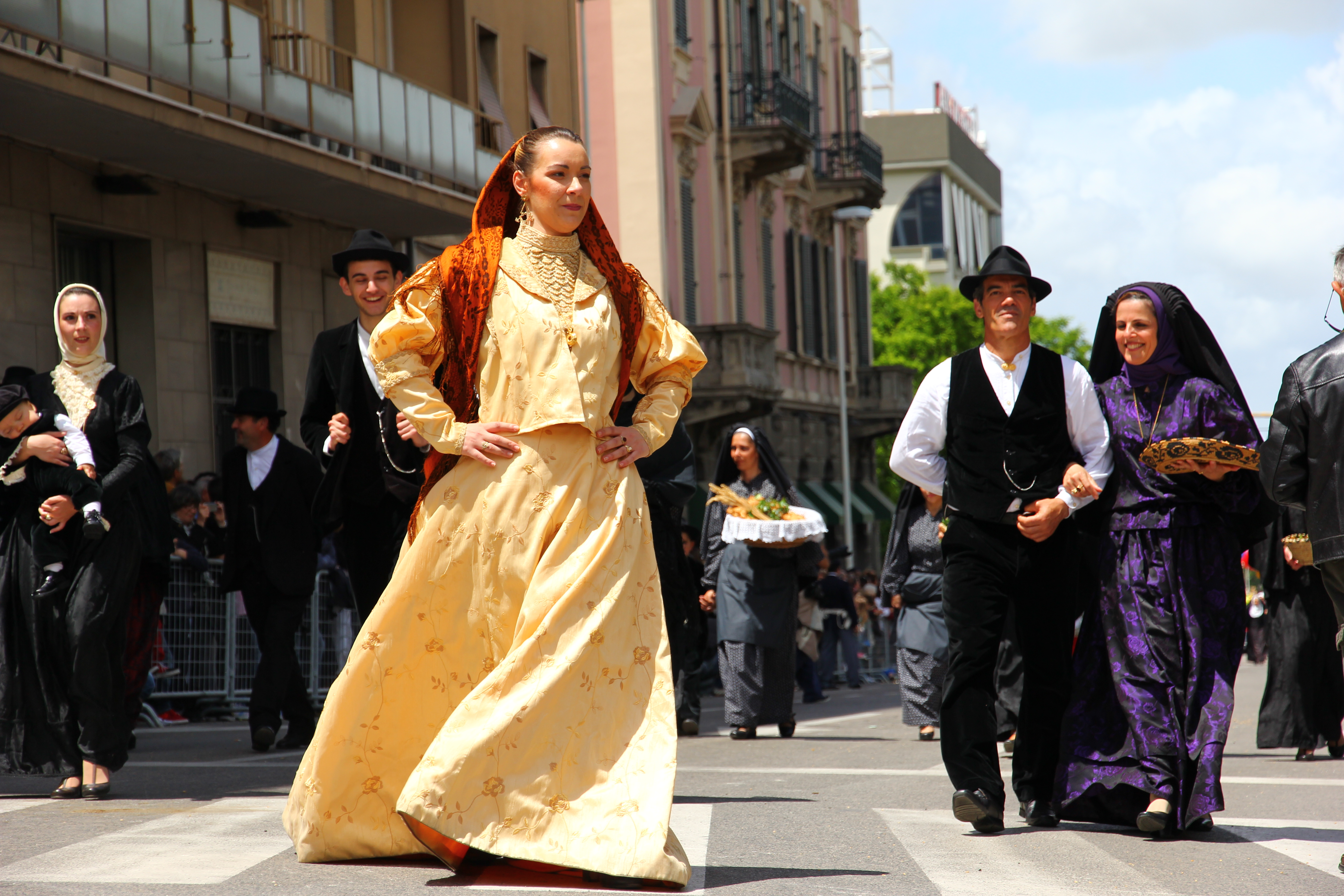
- Telti's traditional costumes

- Location within Sardinia
- Coordinates: 40°53′N 9°21′E
- Country: Italy
- Region: Sardinia
- Province: Gallura North-East Sardinia

Government
  - Mayor: Gian Franco Pindicciu

Area
  - Total: 83.25 km^{2} (32.14 sq mi)
- Elevation: 326 m (1,070 ft)

Population (2026)
  - Total: 2,281
  - Density: 27.40/km^{2} (70.96/sq mi)
- Demonym: Teltesi
- Time zone: UTC+1 (CET)
  - Summer (DST): UTC+2 (CEST)
- Postal code: 07020
- Dialing code: 0789
- Patron saint: St. Victoria and Anatolia
- Website: Official website

Telti is a town and comune (municipality) in the Province of Gallura North-East Sardinia in the autonomous island region of Sardinia in Italy. It has 2,281 inhabitants.

Telti borders the municipalities of Calangianus, Monti, Olbia, and Sant'Antonio di Gallura.

== Demographics ==
As of 2026, the population is 2,281, of which 50.1% are male, and 49.9% are female. Minors make up 15.1% of the population, and seniors make up 25.8%.

Historical population

Year	Pop.	±%
1861	738	—
1871	765	+3.7%
1881	872	+14.0%
1901	1,090	+25.0%
1911	1,152	+5.7%
1921	1,211	+5.1%
1931	1,372	+13.3%
1936	1,453	+5.9%

Year	Pop.	±%
1951	1,691	+16.4%
1961	1,850	+9.4%
1971	1,616	−12.6%
1981	1,809	+11.9%
1991	1,922	+6.2%
2001	1,969	+2.4%
2011	2,222	+12.8%
2021	2,236	+0.6%

Source: ISTAT

=== Immigration ===
As of 2025, immigrants make up 7.0% of the total population. The 5 largest foreign countries of birth are Romania, Ukraine, Morocco, France, and Switzerland.
