= Castello di Gamberale =

Coordinates: 41.9045°N 14.2103°E

Castle of Gamberale
- Castello di Gamberale
- Gamberale
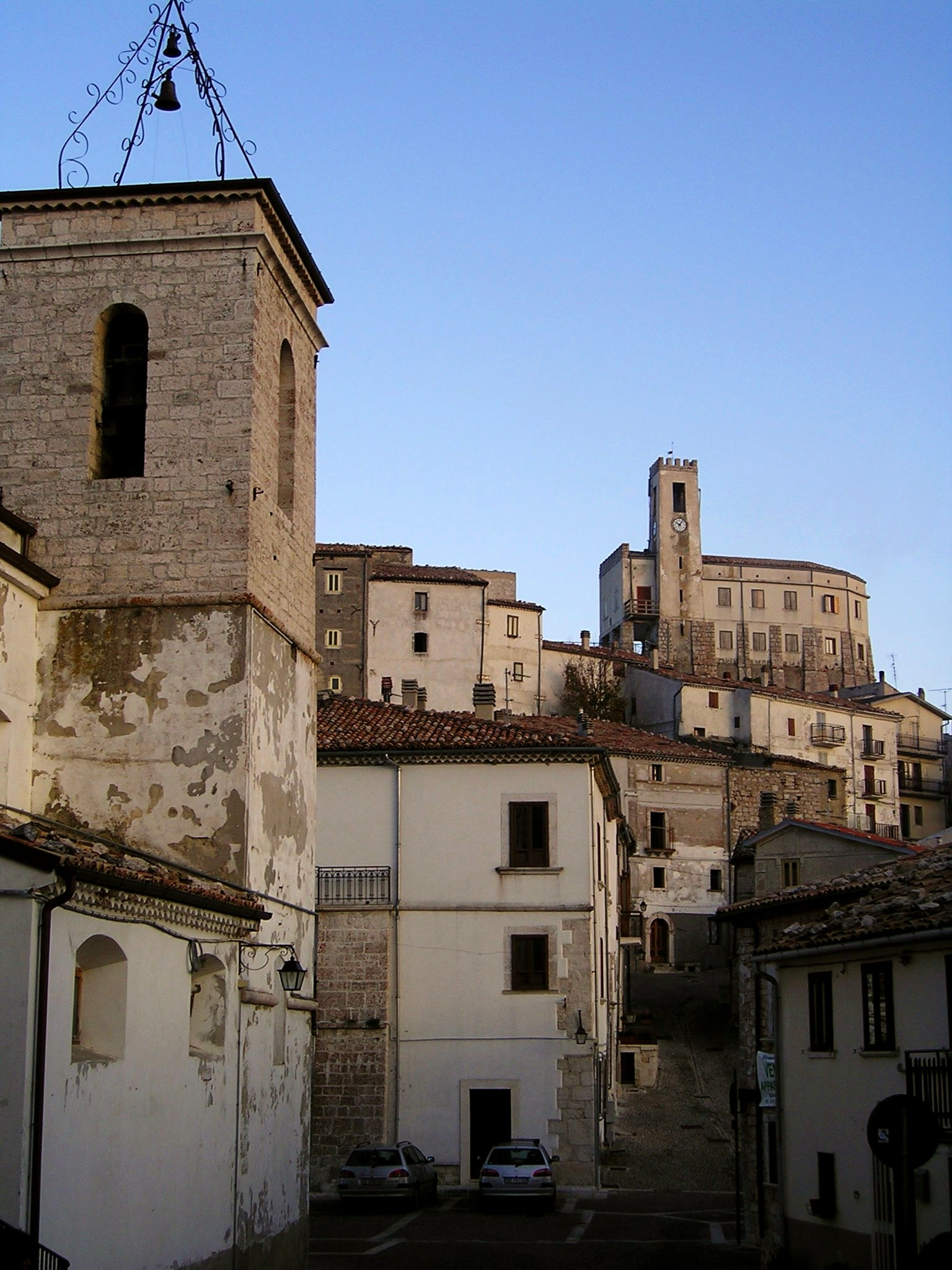
- Castle in Gamberale

Site information
- Type: Castle

Location

Site history
- Built: 14th century

Castello di Gamberale (Italian for Castle of Gamberale) is a Middle Ages castle in Gamberale, Province of Chieti (Abruzzo), Italy.

== History ==
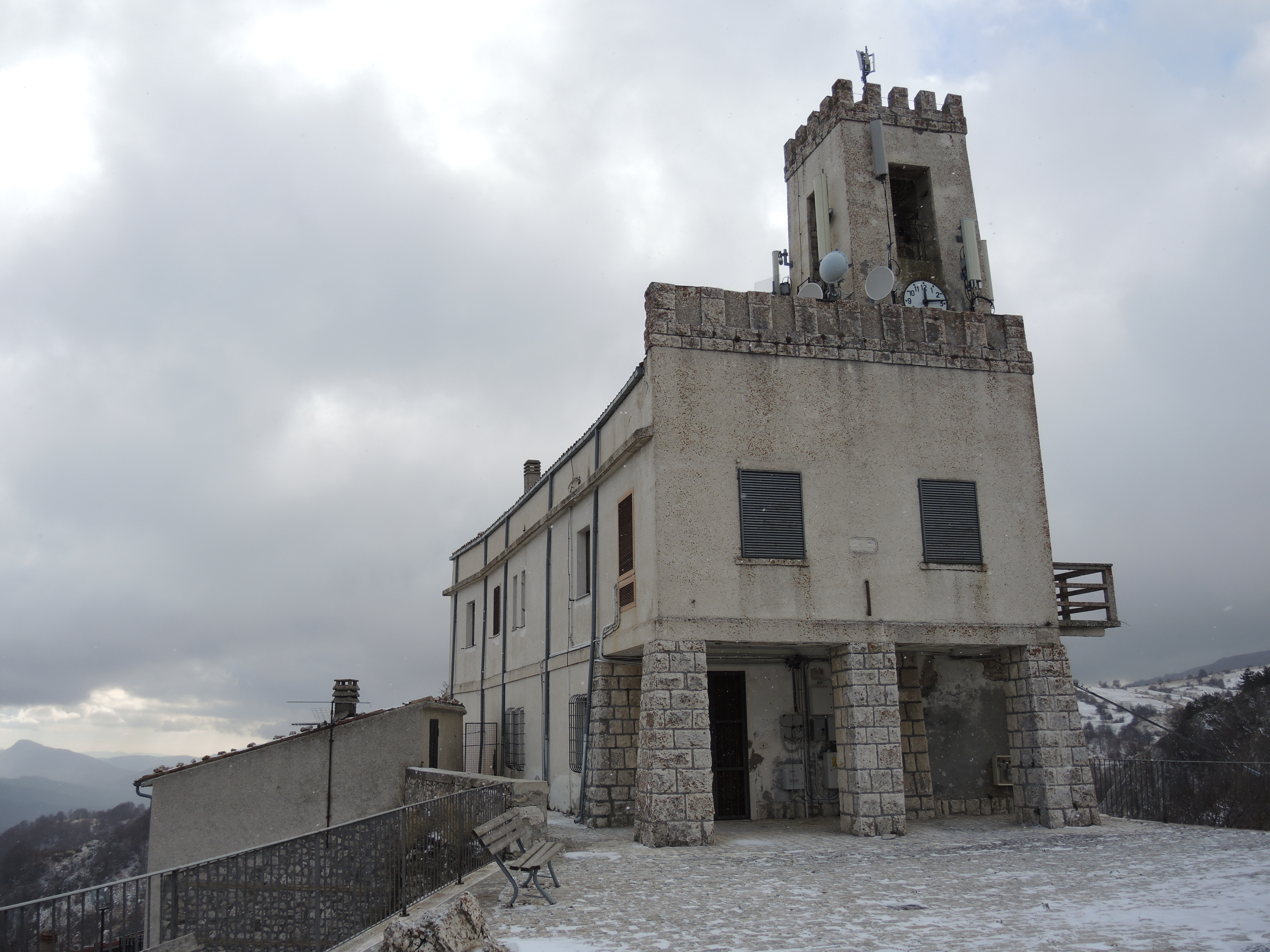
Front view of the castle

The castle was constructed around the 12th century along with a church dedicated to Saint Michael, which later incorporated the entire fortress. In the previous century, there was already a small tower for observation, possibly Norman, which was expanded with the arrival of Neapolitan barons from Capua, who replaced the monks of Gamerrano.

The castle passed through the hands of various barons: initially owned by Raimondo d'Annecchino, it belonged to Giovanni Maria d'Annecchino in the 16th century. It was then owned by Giovanni Crispano and sold to Baron Giuseppe Mellucci for 500 ducats. It later passed to the Marquis Odoardo Benedetti, a nobleman from the province of L'Aquila, and finally, on April 14, 1777, it came into the possession of the Mascitelli family from Atessa, who were the last feudal lords of the area.

In the following centuries, the castle-fortress was used as a prison and a headquarters to dominate the valley. The church of Saint Michael was already in disrepair due to the damage from the 1706 earthquake, and the town was developing further down the valley, around the baronial casino Pollice and the church of Saint Lawrence, which was rebuilt in 1709.

By the early 1900s, the castle had collapsed and was partially rebuilt to house a nursery by the National Fascist Institute.

In 1943, during World War II, it was occupied by the retreating Nazis moving towards Castel di Sangro along the Gustav Line, becoming a strategic observation point over the Sangro valley. Due to Allied and German bombings, the structure was damaged, and the section overlooking the valley of Sant'Angelo del Pesco collapsed.

The subsequent 1984 earthquake caused the guard tower to collapse, which was reconstructed with modern elements, trying to replicate the original medieval appearance.

An inscription on the main facade notes that the castle was restored in 1881 thanks to Pasquale Bucci. Further restorations followed the damage from World War II and the 1984 earthquake, giving the castle its current pseudo-medieval appearance.

== Architecture ==
The castle has a central rectangular plan, with one side forming a semicircle, resembling an apse. The stone bastions have survived centuries of destruction, as have the massive columns of the portico on the facade and the pavement of the square in front.

The windows are modern and rectangular in shape. The turret, opened with arched windows, is equipped with circular clocks and a radio antenna for the town. The external facades are plastered white, contrasting with the stone sections. The tower is topped with stone battlements.

Inside, one of the rooms, possibly built on an older church, is used as a meeting hall for the municipality. The interior is adorned with monumental murals by contemporary artist Morena Antonucci.
