= Oratory of the Madonna della Battaglia, Quattro Castella =

Oratory in Quattro Castella, Italy

Coordinates: 44.6133°N 10.4568°E

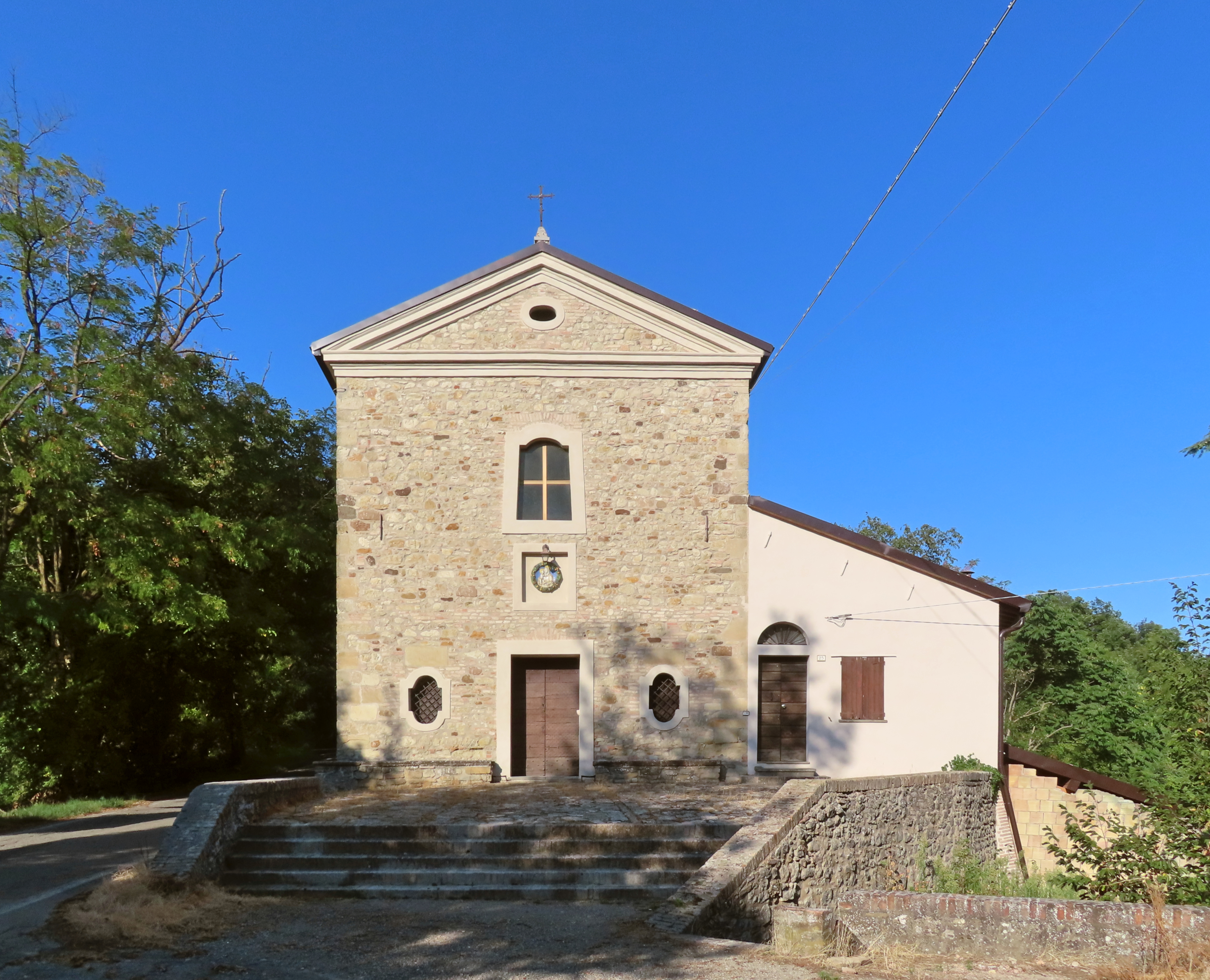

The Oratory of the Madonna della Battaglia is a Roman Catholic chapel-church located on the Strada Provinciale numero 78, in the frazione of Bergonzano, outside of the town of Quattro Castella, province of Reggio Emilia, region of Emilia-Romagna, Italy.

== History ==
This oratory is dedicated to the Virgin of the Battle to commemorate the victory in October 1092 by the forces of Matilda of Tuscany against those of the Henry IV, Holy Roman Emperor. The defeat, also called the battle of Monte Giumigna or Sedignano or Battaglia delle Niebe, caused Henry IV to abdicate in favor of his son. By the early 1528, it was said an icon at the site was responsible for miracles and a chapel was erected. In 1724, the present oratory was built on those foundations. An inscription from 1868 recalls refurbishment at that time. The stone facade is simple with a triangular pediment.
