= San Antonino =

San Antonino may refer to any of three towns and municipalities in Oaxaca, Mexico:

- San Antonino Castillo Velasco
- San Antonino El Alto
- San Antonino Monte Verde
