= Sant'Antonio, Vaglio Basilicata =

Church in Vaglio Basilicata, Italy

Coordinates: 40°40′3.77″N 15°55′9.78″E

Sant'Antonio is a church and convent in Vaglio Basilicata, province of Potenza, region of Basilicata, Italy.

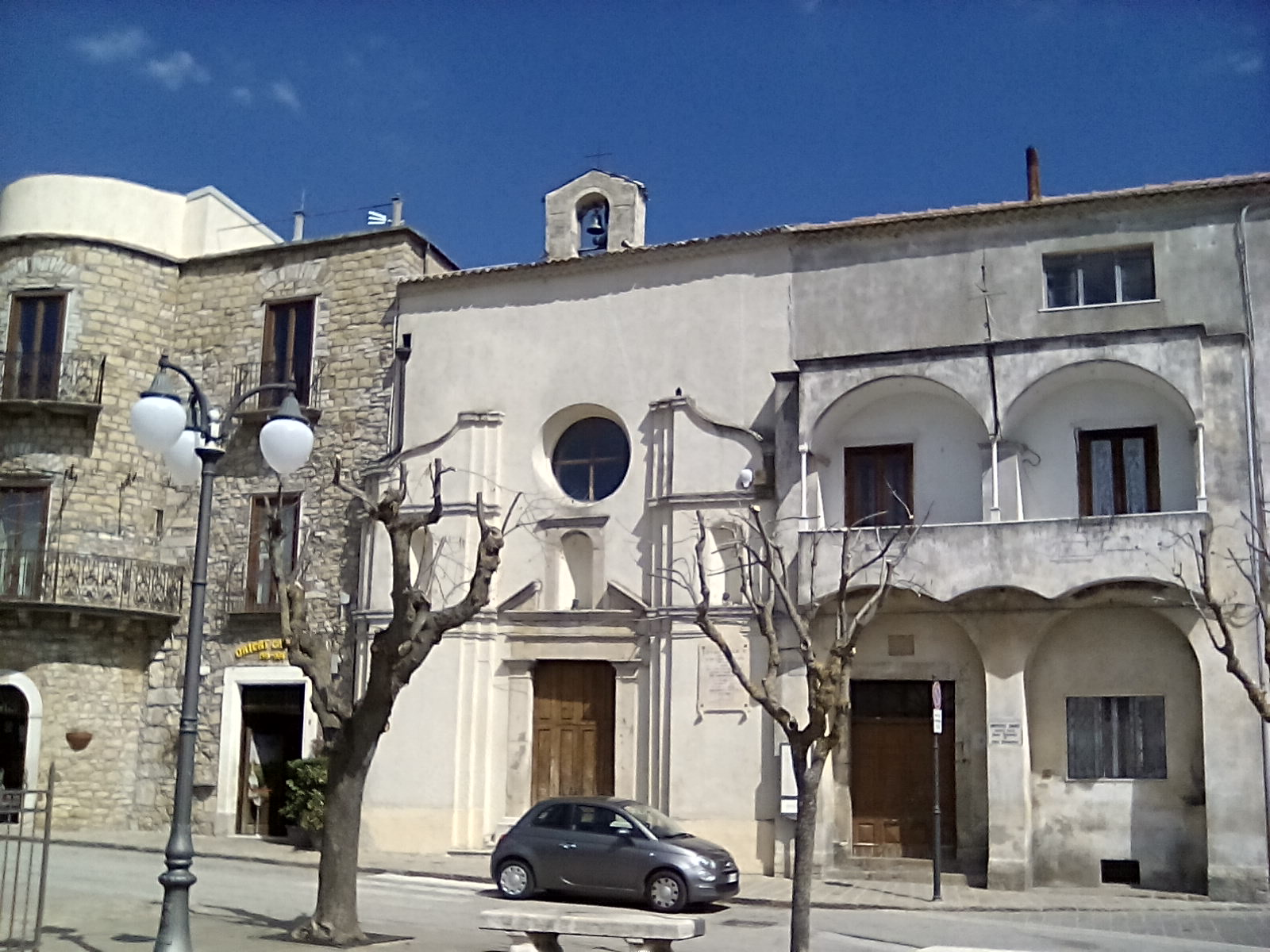
The convent

== History ==
This convent, dedicated to St Anthony Abbot, was erected by the 16th century by the Franciscan order. The architecture is simple, but the interior has an elaborate polychrome wood altar with a 17th-century polyptych depicting St Michael Archangel, St Vitus, and the Annunciation by Francesco Paterno da Buccino, as well as statues of St Antony Abbot, St Leonardo, and St Francis of Paola.

The church has six wooden side altars. The second altar on the right has a canvas depicting the Holy Family and St Anne (1663) by Francesco Paterno of Buccino. The first altar on the right has a 17th-century fresco by Girolamo Todisco, depicting the Madonna and Child with St Anne.

One of the lateral altars has three 17th-century statues depicting St Francis of Assisi, St Apollonia, and St Lucy. The next altar has a statue of the Immaculate Conception. The third altar on the right has a Madonna delle Grazie with Saints Domenic and Charles also by Paterno. The walls have a number of 17th-century canvases depicting Franciscan Saints, a Madonna, and a Resurrection (1626) by Attilio De Laurentis.
