= Antonios Antoniadis =

Greek medical microbiologist

- Born: Greece
- Scientific career
- Fields: Medicine, microbiology
- Workplaces: Aristotle University of Thessaloniki

Antonios Antoniadis is a professor emeritus of the Medical School of the Aristotle University of Thessaloniki (Greece). For 14 years he was the director of the First Microbiology laboratory of the same School and Head of the “WHO Collaborating Centre for Reference and Research on Arbovirus and Hemorrhagic Fever Viruses” which he himself created in 1996.

He is currently the President of the executive board of the Hellenic Pasteur Institute.

As a medical doctor, he specialized in Medical Microbiology and he obtained the Diploma in Bacteriology (Dip.Bact-Lond.) from the London School of Hygiene and Tropical Diseases, University of London. He also trained at the Yale Arbovirus Research Unit (Yale University, USA), at the Department of Disease Assessment of the US Army Medical Research Institute for Infectious Diseases (USAMRIID, Fort Detrick USA), at the Central Public Health Laboratory (CPHL) in London, UK, and at the National Laboratory of Microbiology (NBL) in Stockholm, Sweden. During the academic year 1992 – 93 he was visiting professor at the University of Heidelberg, Germany.

Since 1980 his research is focused on viral tropical diseases and in particular on Viral hemorrhagic fevers. The outcome of his research was the laboratory diagnosis of several “new” diseases in Greece and in Europe leading to a rapid public health response during outbreaks, epidemics and /or pandemics. In the context of this research he has worked in the Democracy of Central Africa, Senegal, Nigeria, and China, he has been invited to give lectures by various International Research Institutes and Universities and he was a member of the Reviewers Group for the establishment of a Global Electronic Reporting System of Emerging Infectious Diseases and Toxins (ProMed) organized by the Federation of American Scientists (FAS).

Professor Antoniadis was for almost seven years a member of the executive board of the Hellenic Center for Diseases Control and Prevention, and he participated and participates in boards of the Greek Ministry of Health and Solidarity concerning public health issues. Since 1992 he is the National Expert at the UN, Geneva, for the Biological Weapons Convention and the Ad hoc meetings of experts (Treaty for the Destruction of the Biological and Toxin Weapons), National representative for the Poliovirus Containment of the WHO Poliovirus Global Eradication Program and during Athens 2004 Olympic Games he was coordinator of the Laboratory Network against bioterrorism actions.

As a WHO consultant he led WHO missions in Iraq and Albania during Crimean–Congo hemorrhagic fever epidemics, he participated as an expert in boards of the European Union for issues concerning viral hemorrhagic fevers, participated in EU missions to several countries (i.e.Russia, China) and coordinated the EU workshop in Xian, China for the collaboration of EU and China in the field of viral hemorrhagic fevers.

He is coauthor of two textbooks of Medical Microbiology and the scientific editor of three English textbooks of Medical Microbiology translated into Greek. He has published more than 100 original scientific publications in peer-reviewed international journals and has coordinated several research projects funded by EU, United States, WHO, NATO and Greece.
