= Sant'Antonino Martire, Quattro Castella =

Church in Quattro Castella, Italy

Coordinates: 44°37′54.8″N 10°28′18.8″E

The Sant'Antonino Martire is a Roman Catholic church located in the town center of Quattro Castella, province of Reggio Emilia, region of Emilia Romagna, Italy.

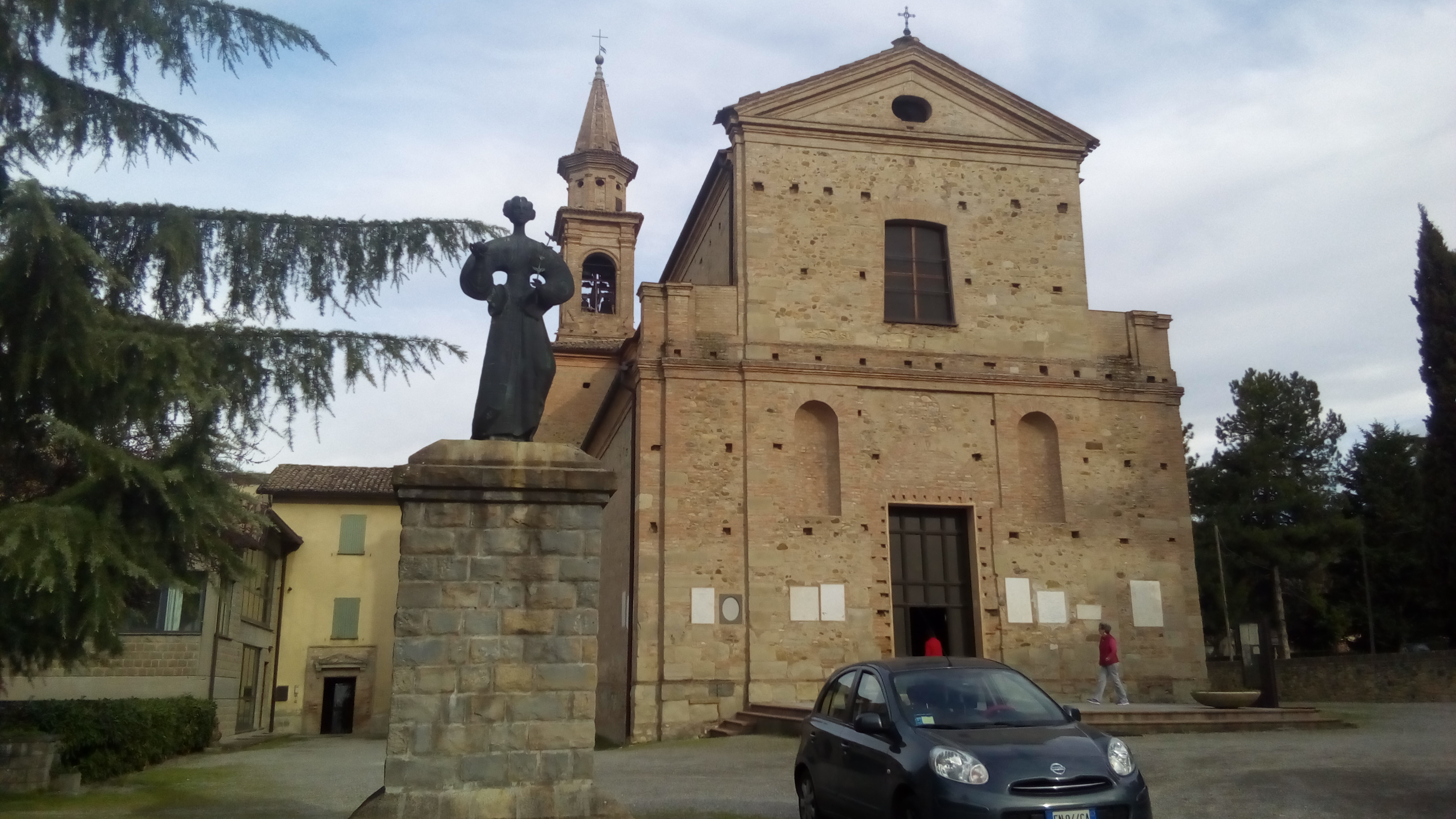
The facade of the church

== History ==
The church is located on the site of a church founded by Matilda of Canossa, and restored in 1112. Some epigraphs cite an even more ancient church, from the late 4th-century, at the site. Reconstruction of the medieval church began in mid 1500s, starting with the apse, transept, and presbytery, and in 1615 with expansion of the nave and addition of side altars. In 1664, the church still had a greek-cross layout. The local prior Alfonso Canossa completed the church, except for leaving the facade in stone, during 1701 to 1716. In the 1935-1937, the painter G. Baroni depicted the Ascension of Christ, Triumph of the Eucharist and other chiaroscuro decorations, leading to a formal reconsecration in 1937. The facade includes spolia including crosses and tombstones from the ancient cemetery. Further restorations were completed in 1992.
