= Tonioli =

Tonioli is a surname of Italian origin. Notable people with the surname include:

- Bruno Tonioli (born 1955), Italian entertainer
- Marcella Tonioli (born 1986), Italian archer

== See also ==
- Antonioli
- Toniolo
