= Giovanni Antoniano =

Dutch Patristic scholar, writer and opponent of Protestantism

Giovanni Antoniano (died 1588) was a Dutch Patristic scholar, and writer and an opponent of Protestantism.

== Works ==
Antoniano published (Cologne, 1537) the work of Gregory of Nyssa on the creation of man and the Hexameron of Basil of Caesarea, both in the Latin translation of Dionysius Exiguus. He also published (Cologne, 1560) the writings of Paulinus of Nola, and the letters of St. Jerome in Antwerp, in 1568.
