= Gamberale =

- Comune
- Comune di Gamberale
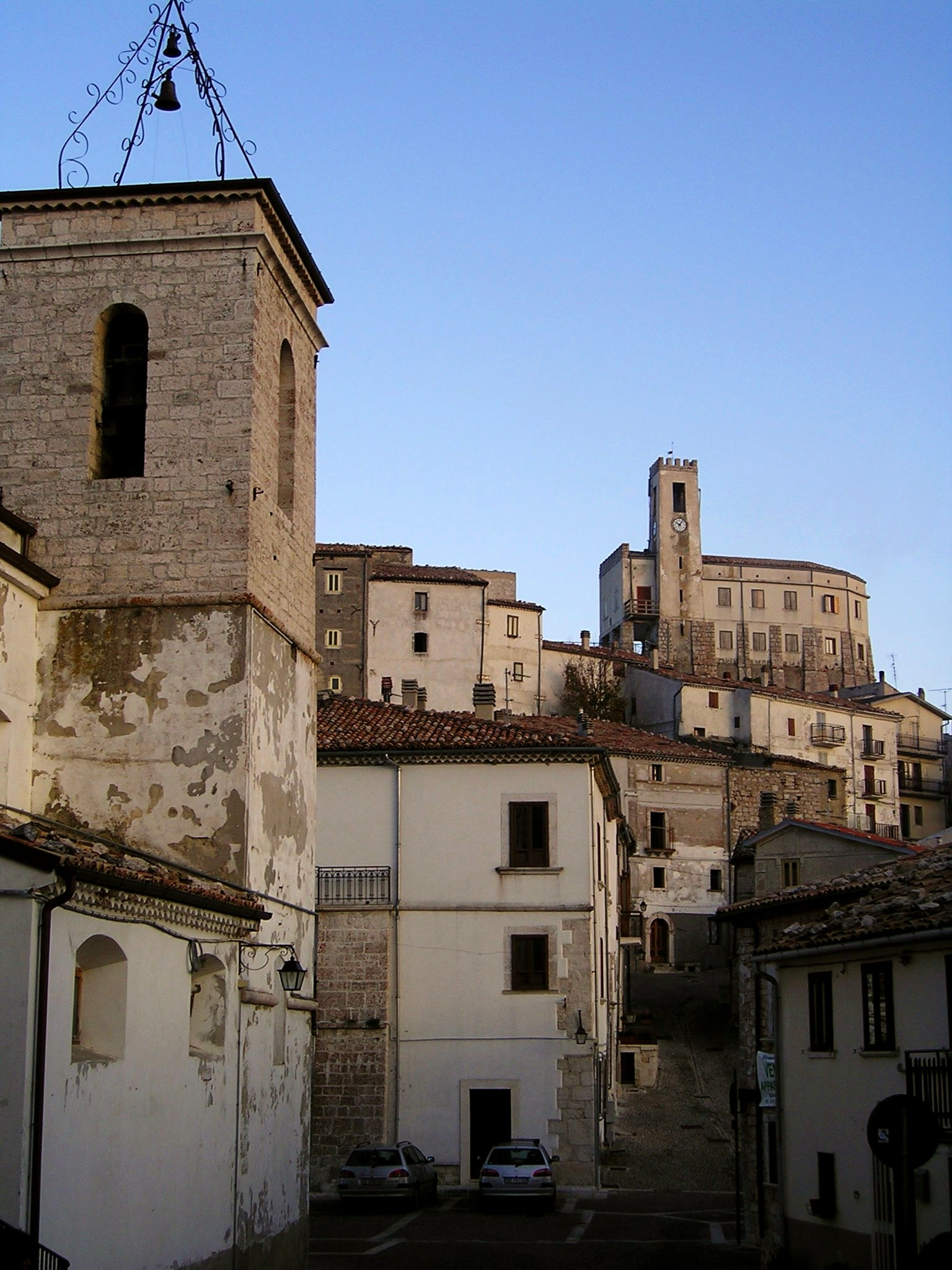
- Gamberale

- Location within Italy Location within Abruzzo
- Coordinates: 41°54′N 14°13′E
- Country: Italy
- Region: Abruzzo
- Province: Chieti (CH)
- Frazioni: Casale Stazione, Casale Tesoro, Piane d'Ischia, Sant'Antonio

Government
  - Mayor: Maurizio Bucci

Area
  - Total: 15 km^{2} (5.8 sq mi)
- Elevation: 1,343 m (4,406 ft)

Population (31 March 2017)
  - Total: 307 (approx.)
  - Density: 20/km^{2} (53/sq mi)
- Demonym: Gamberalesi
- Time zone: UTC+1 (CET)
  - Summer (DST): UTC+2 (CEST)
- Postal code: 66040
- Dialing code: 0872
- Patron saint: St. Lawrence
- Saint day: 10 August
- Website: Official website

Gamberale is a village and comune in the Province of Chieti in the Abruzzo region of central Italy.

The village is 81 kilometres (50 mi) from Chieti, the provincial capital. It lies high in the Apennine Mountains, at an elevation of 1,343 metres (4,406 ft).

== Population ==
1991	2001	2011	Current
486	394	328	~320

== Most recent data about Population ==
On 1 January 2016 there were 320 inhabitants in Gamberale, 147 males and 173 females. There were 3 inhabitants less than one year old (1 male and 2 females) and 0 inhabitants being one-hundred years old or more.

== Official Website ==
http://www.comune.gamberale.ch.it/

== See also ==
- Castello di Gamberale
