= Antoniadi scale =

Weather conditions categorization system

The Antoniadi scale is a system used by amateur astronomers to categorise the weather conditions when viewing the stars at night.

== Invention ==
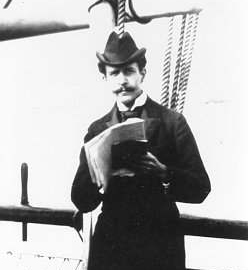
E. M. Antoniadi.

The Antoniadi scale was invented by Eugène Antoniadi, a Greek astronomer, who lived from 1870 to 1944. Living most of his life in France, he spent his time viewing Mars from Camille Flammarion's observatory. He was very prestigious and was eventually given access to the Meudon Observatory, the largest of the time.

== Current usage ==
Now the scale considered as the metric system of astronomical seeing, being used as a default measurement all over the world. Until recently in 2018, astronomers have been debating whether a new system with more categories is necessary.

== Description ==
The scale is a five-point system, with 1 being the best seeing conditions and 5 being the worst. The actual definitions are as follows:

1. (I.) Perfect seeing, without a quiver.
2. (II.) Slight quivering of the image with moments of calm lasting several seconds.
3. (III.) Moderate seeing with larger air tremors that blur the image.
4. (IV.) Poor seeing, constant troublesome undulations of the image.
5. (V.) Very bad seeing, hardly stable enough to allow a rough sketch to be made.

Note that the scale is usually indicated by use of a Roman numeral or an ordinary number.

== Other ways of indicating seeing ==
Astronomers have devised several methods for defining the quality of seeing apart from the Antoniadi scale, including:

- Transparency
- Limiting magnitude
- a light meter
