= Pietro Antoniani =

Italian painter

Pietro Antoniani (circa 1740 – 1805) was an Italian painter, mainly of sea- and landscapes, often animated with figures, but also of historical subjects.

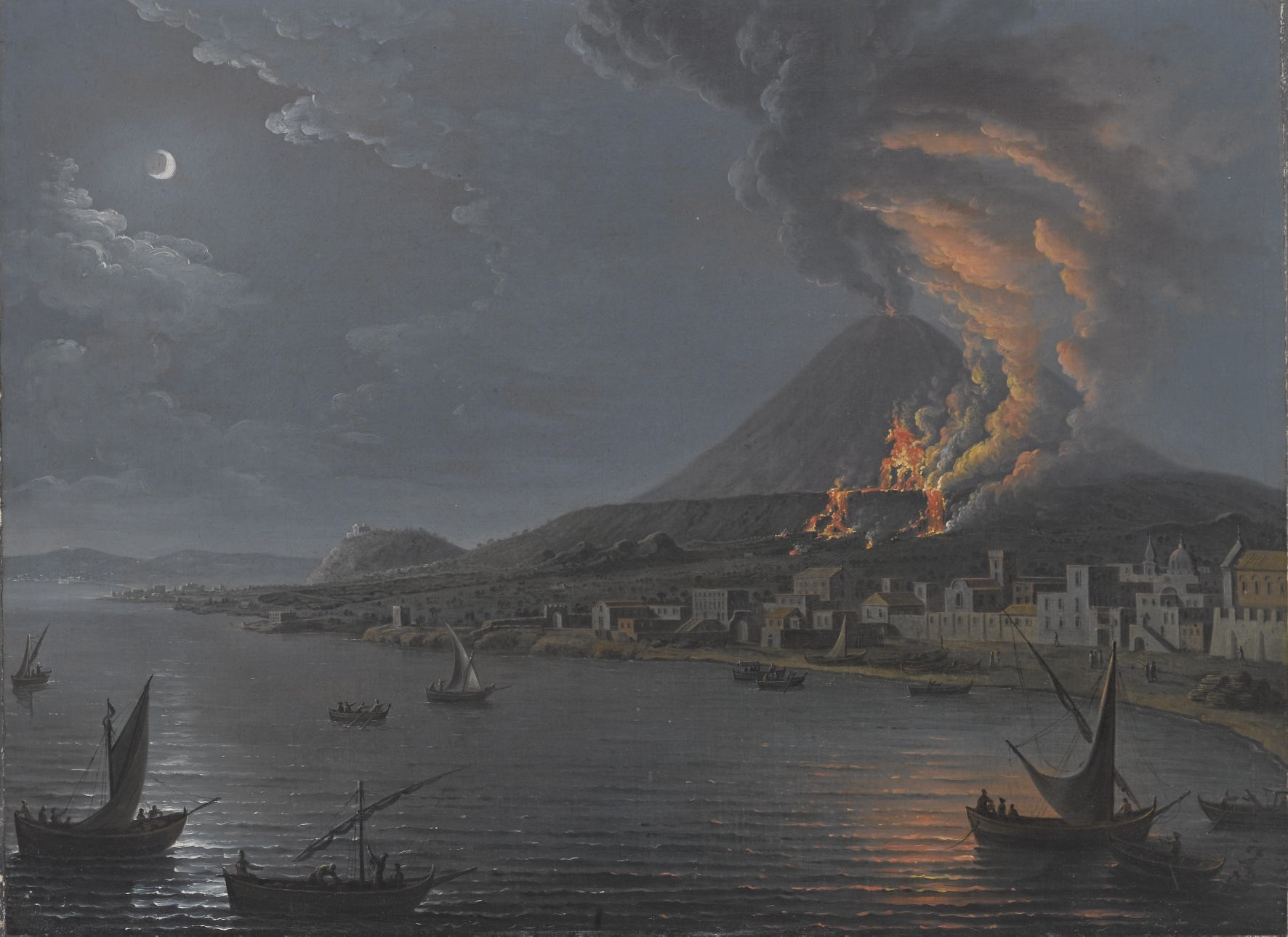
Eruption of Vesuvius seen from Torre Annunziata

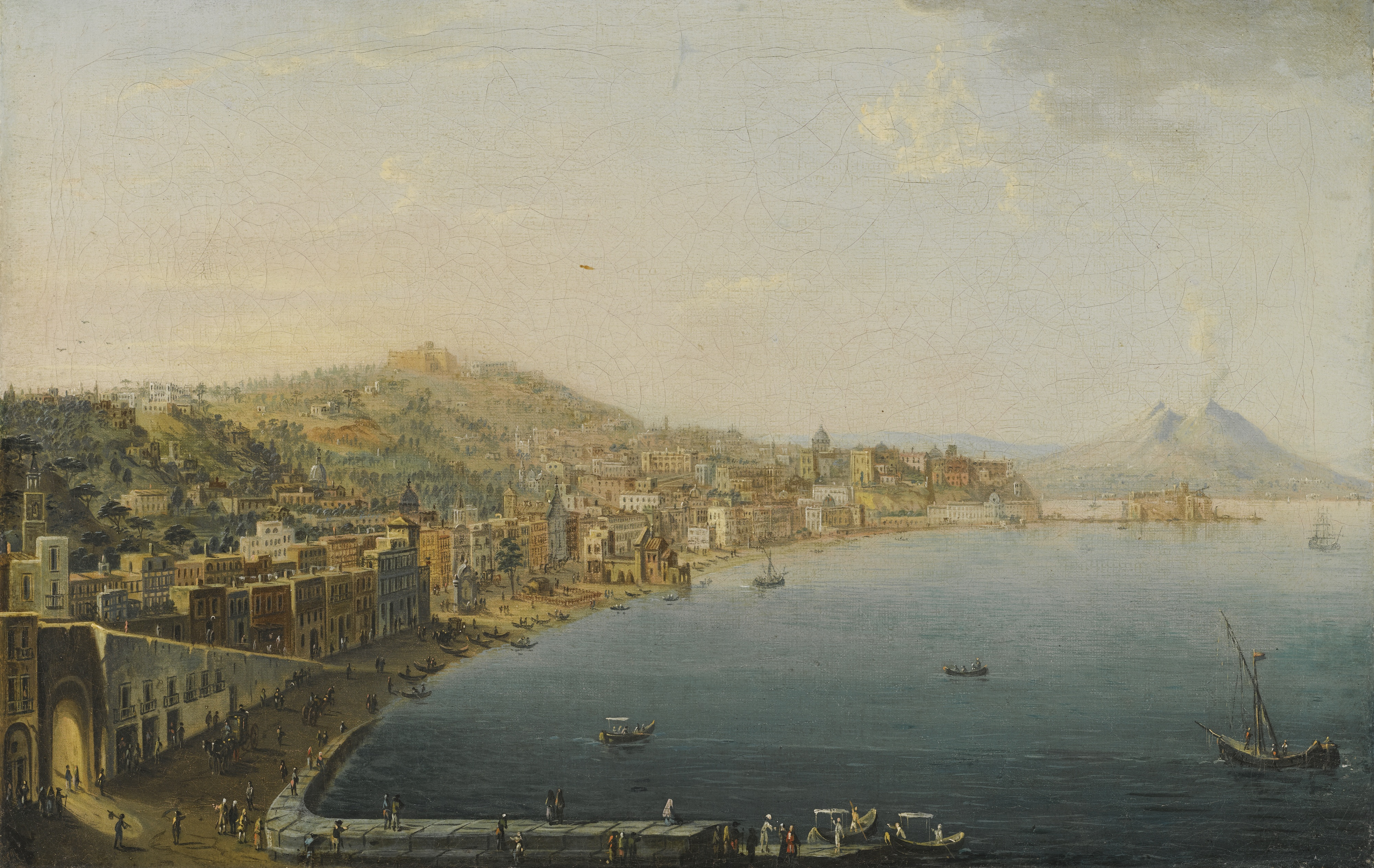
View of the shoreline of Chiaia from the convent of San Antonio

== Biography ==
He was born in Milan. Like his compatriot Giacinto Gigante in the next generation, and appealing to British tastes, he produced many paintings of the exotic volcanic eruptions of Vesuvius. He was likely a pupil of Jacob Philipp Hackert and the precursors of the School of Posillipo.
