= Sant'Antonio Abate, Francofonte =

Building in Francofonte, Italy

Coordinates: 37.°N 15.°E

Sant'Antonio Abate
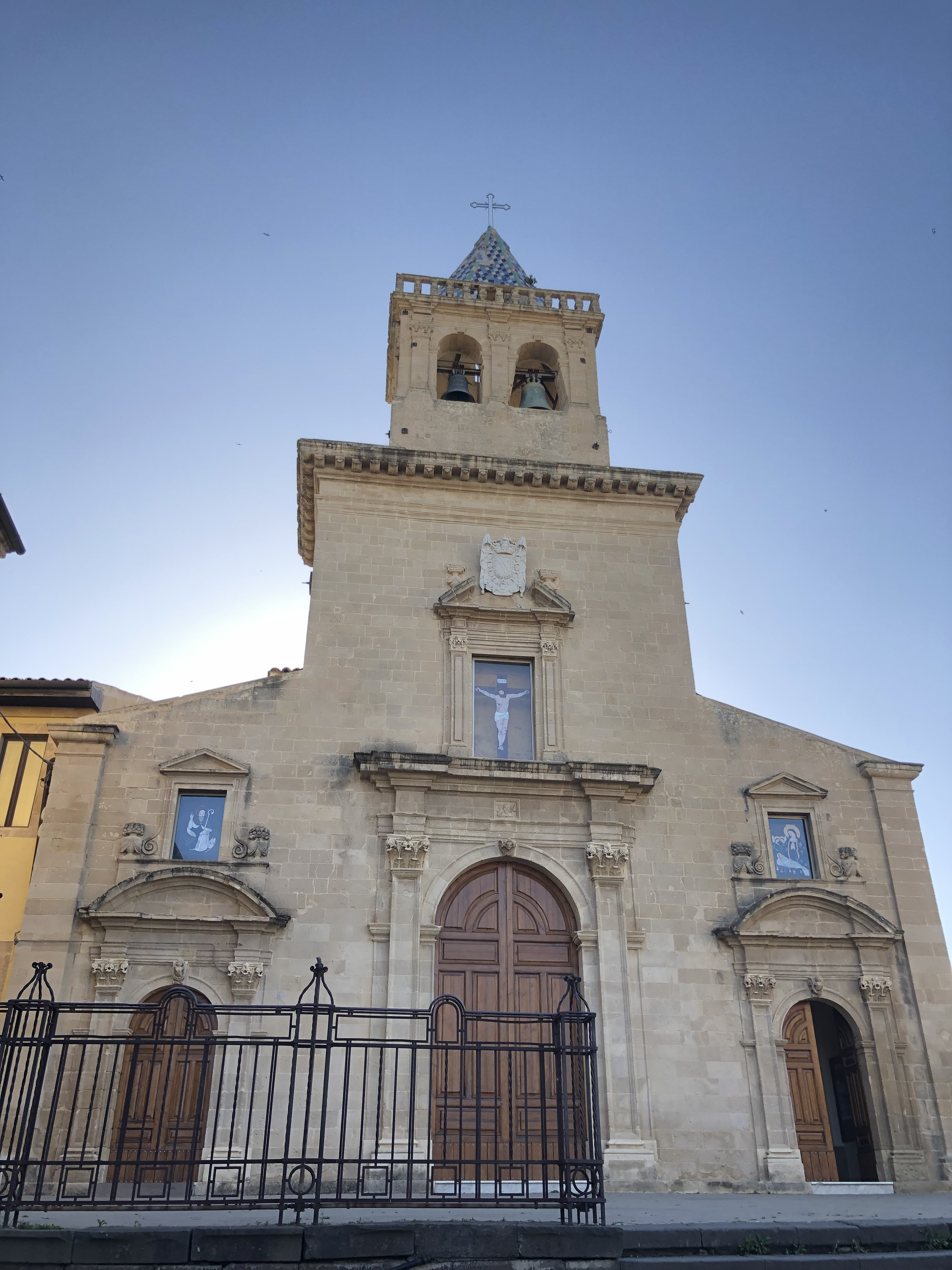
- Facade

Religion
- Affiliation: Catholic Church

Location
- Location: Francofonte, Italy
- Interactive map of Sant'Antonio Abate

Architecture
- Type: Church

Sant'Antonio Abate is the Roman Catholic mother church (chiesa madre) in the town of Francofonte, province of Syracuse, Sicily, Italy.

== History and description ==
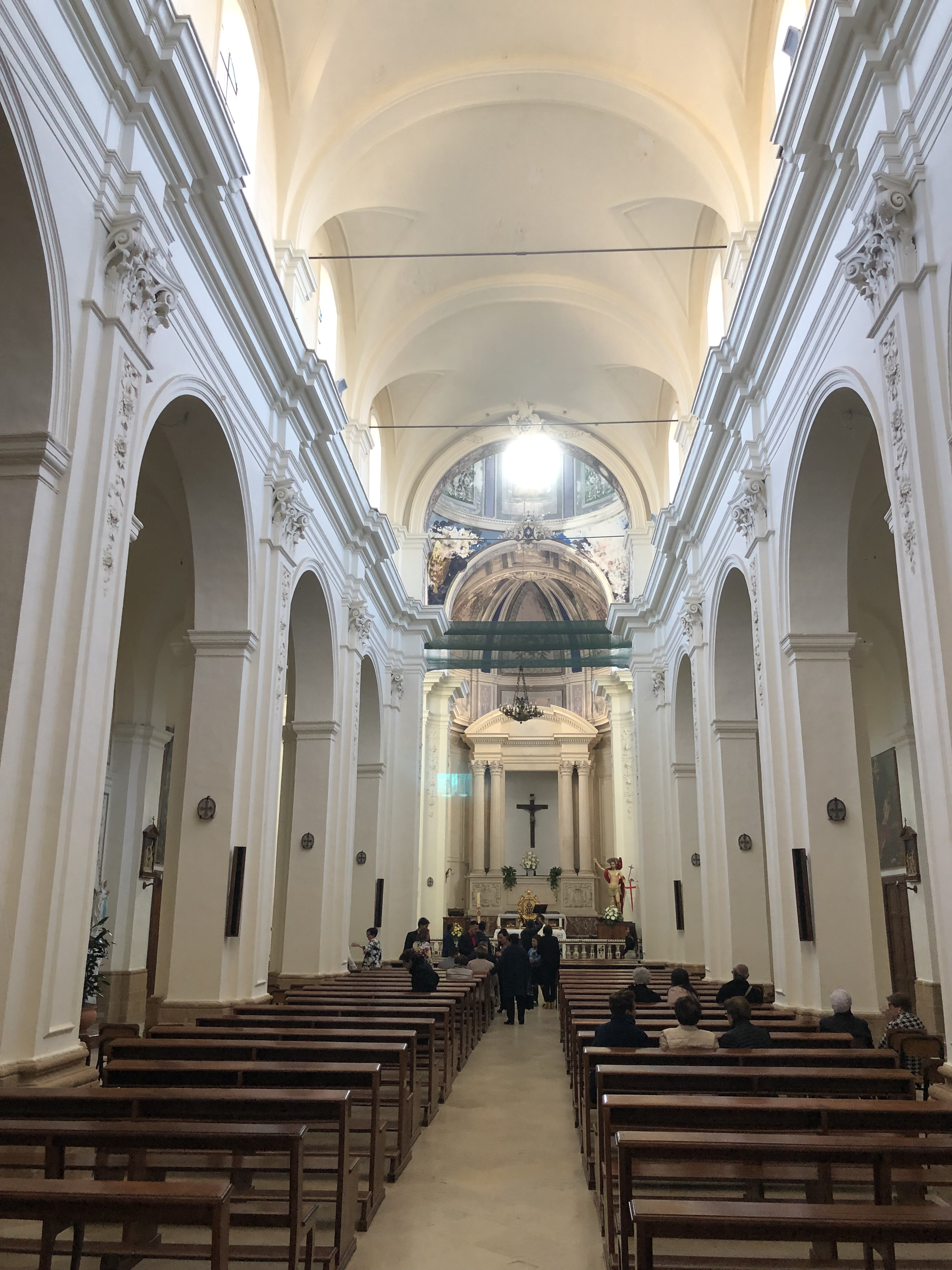
Nave towards apse

The church was originally built in the late 12th century and attached to a hilltop abbey, then remote from a population center. The town was not founded until 1360. The layout has three naves with a Romanesque-style trilobate apse. In the 19th century, a cemetery was erected alongside the church. The church suffered damage in 1542 from an earthquake. In 1570, the church adopted the devotion to the Madonna della Neve. This Marian devotion became patroness of the town in 1619, substituting Saint Anthony Abbott.

The lords of the town, the aristocratic Gravina-Cruyllas family, endowed the church with patronage. The 1693 Sicily earthquake severely damaged the church. Reconstruction at the same site was quick, with the church rebuilt by 1699. The new central bell-tower was completed by 1717. In 1742, the church was made collegiate. The church escaped much damage during World War II, but the earthquake of 13 December 1990 required substantial restoration.
