= Bibbiano =

Comune in Emilia-Romagna, Italy

Bibbiano Bibiēn (Emilian)
- Comune
- Comune di Bibbiano
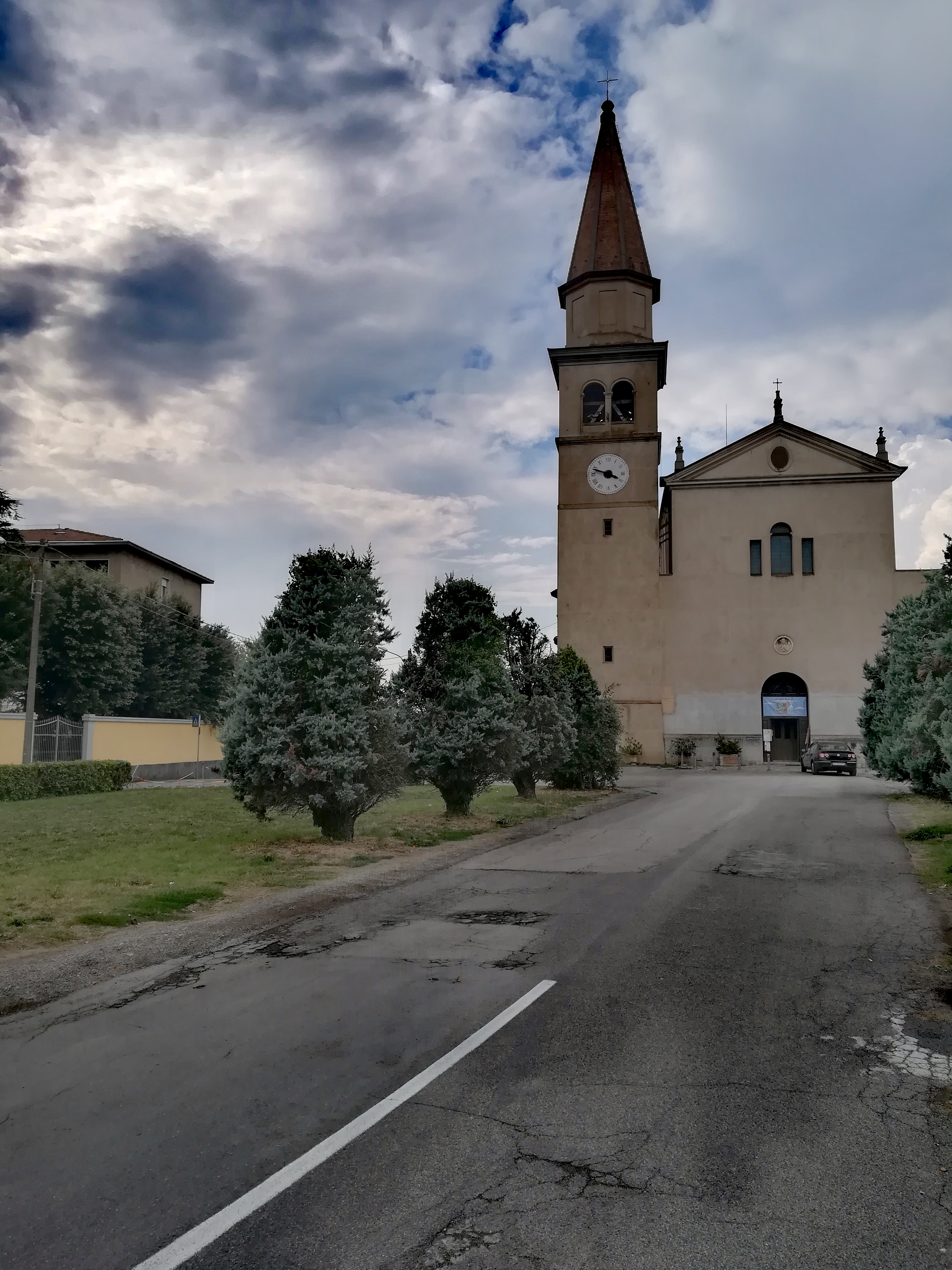
- Parish church of Santa Maria Assunta

- Location within Italy Location within Emilia-Romagna
- Coordinates: 44°40′N 10°28′E
- Country: Italy
- Region: Emilia-Romagna
- Province: Reggio Emilia (RE)
- Frazioni: Barco, Belvedere, Casale di Sopra, Case Catalani, Gattaglio, Ghiardo, Il Folletto, Mangallana, Piazzola, Razza, San Filippo

Government
  - Mayor: Andrea Carletti (PD)

Area
  - Total: 28.16 km^{2} (10.87 sq mi)
- Elevation: 121 m (397 ft)

Population (31 December 2017)
  - Total: 10,241
  - Density: 363.7/km^{2} (941.9/sq mi)
- Demonym: Bibbianesi
- Time zone: UTC+1 (CET)
  - Summer (DST): UTC+2 (CEST)
- Postal code: 42021
- Dialing code: 0522
- Website: www.comune.bibbiano.re.it

Bibbiano (Italian: [bibˈbjaːno]; Reggiano: Bibiân, locally Bibiēn) is a comune (municipality) in the province of Reggio Emilia, in the Italian region of Emilia-Romagna, located about 70 kilometres (43 mi) northwest of Bologna and about 14 kilometres (9 mi) southwest of Reggio Emilia.

Bibbiano borders the following comuni: Cavriago, Montecchio Emilia, Quattro Castella, Reggio Emilia, San Polo d'Enza.

== Physical geography ==
The municipal area, as well as the capital, is made up of the hamlets of Barco, Corniano, La Fossa, Ghiardo, and Piazzola for a total of 28.02 square kilometers. It borders Cavriago to the north, Reggio Emilia to the east, Quattro Castella and San Polo d'Enza to the south, and Montecchio Emilia to the west.

== History ==
Traces of the first human presence (bottoms of huts, ceramic remains, copious siliceous artefacts) in Bibbiano date back to the period between the Lower Paleolithic and the Neolithic. A long Gallic stay is attested by finds from the Iron Age and by the Celtic inflections which remain in the local dialect. The origin of the toponym is probably linked to the Roman occupation of the first century; numerous Roman finds have come to light following archaeological digs, including pottery and furnishings.

In the 12th century, the history of Bibbiano was inextricably linked to the Canossa family, as the municipal coat of arms demonstrates. The dominion of the Canossa dynasty on Bibbiano ended in the 18th century, when the fiefdom passed to the Marquis Gabbi (1757).

Bibbiano obtained municipal autonomy at the time of the Department of Crostolo.

In 2019, the town was the subject of a media scandal involving allegations of child abuse.

== Culture ==
Parmesan (Parmigiano Reggiano)

The production of cow's milk cheese in the lands where Parmesan cheese is produced dates back to at least the 12th century. It is said that the monks of the Benedictine monastery of Corniano are the ones who discovered the recipe. This discovery marked an epochal change in the rural production of the region, which was until then limited to sheep's cheese. For centuries, the dispute over where Parmesan cheese was born has fascinated historians and cheese producers. However, most historians agree that the cradle of the renaissance of Parmesan since 1700 is Bibbiano. The main reasons are quality forage, stable pastureland, availability of water, and the skill of Bibbiano cheesemakers.

In 2008, the consortium "Bibbiano la Culla" (Bibbiano, the cradle) was established to promote and enhance Bibbiano cheese with its own quality brand. The trademark has received a protected designation of origin (PDO)

== Infrastructure and transport ==
Rail transport

The municipal area of Bibbiano is crossed by the Reggio Emilia-Ciano d'Enza railway; it is served by Barco station as well as six stops: Bibbiano, Bibbiano Fossa, Bibbiano Via Monti, Bivio Barco, Corniano, and Piazzola.
