= Sant'Antonio di Gallura =

Sant'Antonio di Gallura Sant'Antòni de Calanzànos (Sardinian) Sant'Antoni di Gaddhura (Gallurese)
- Comune
- Comune di Sant'Antonio di Gallura
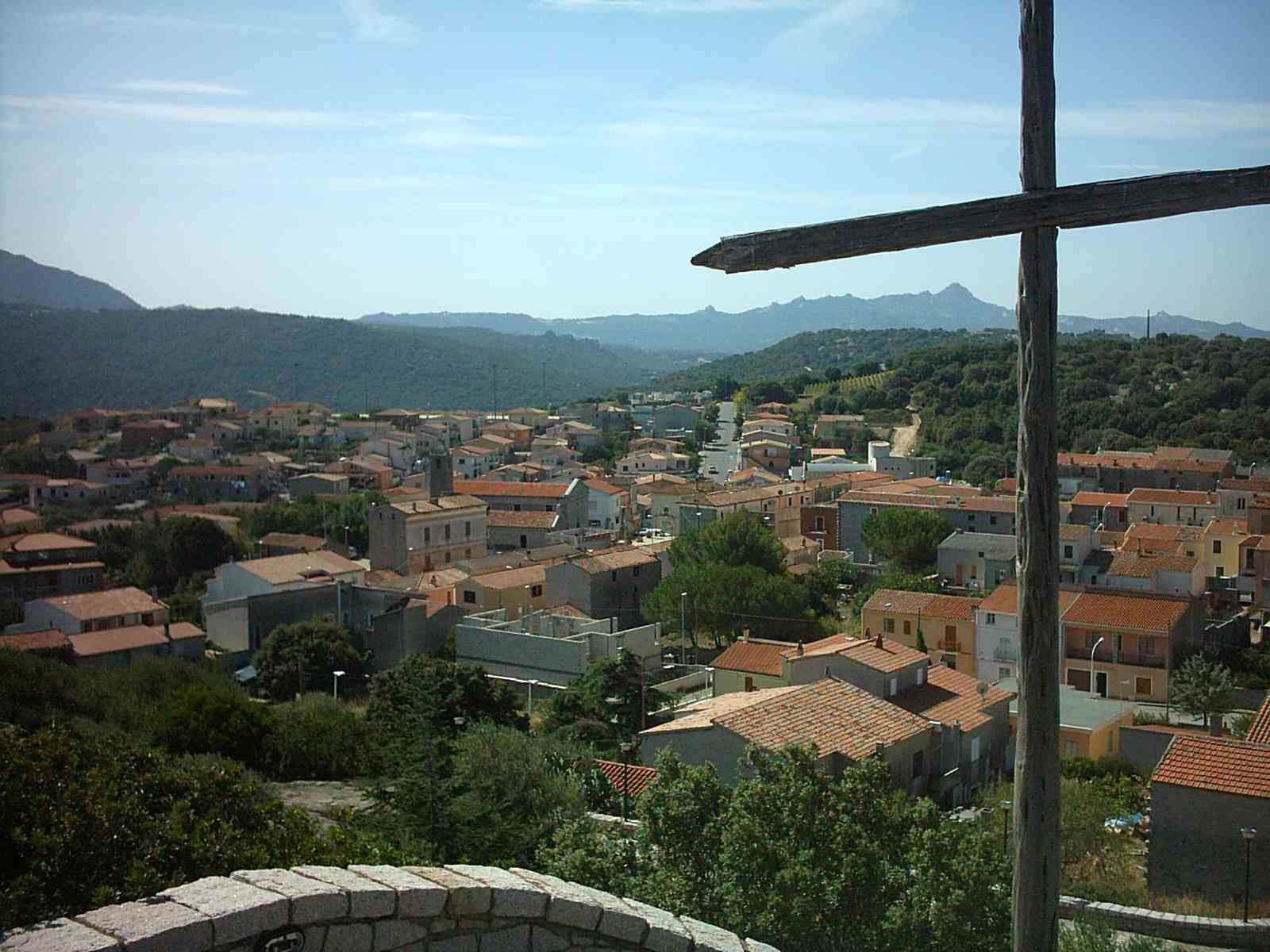
- View of Sant'Antonio di Gallura

- Location within Sardinia
- Coordinates: 41°0′N 9°18′E
- Country: Italy
- Region: Sardinia
- Province: Gallura North-East Sardinia

Government
  - Mayor: Carlo Duilio Viti

Area
  - Total: 81.69 km^{2} (31.54 sq mi)
- Elevation: 354 m (1,161 ft)

Population (2026)
  - Total: 1,432
  - Density: 17.53/km^{2} (45.40/sq mi)
- Demonym: Santantoniesi
- Time zone: UTC+1 (CET)
  - Summer (DST): UTC+2 (CEST)
- Postal code: 07030
- Dialing code: 079

Sant'Antonio di Gallura (Sardinian: Sant'Antòni de Calanzànos, Gallurese: Sant'Antoni di Gaddhura) is a comune (municipality) in the Province of Gallura North-East Sardinia in the autonomous island region of Sardinia in Italy, located about 200 kilometres (120 mi) north of Cagliari and about 20 kilometres (12 mi) northwest of Olbia. It has 1,432 inhabitants.

The economy is based on agriculture, animal husbandry and production of cork. People move seasonally to nearby Arzachena and Olbia to work in touristic structures.

Sant'Antonio di Gallura borders the municipalities of Arzachena, Calangianus, Luras, Olbia, and Telti.

== Demographics ==
As of 2026, the population is 1,432, of which 49.3% are male, and 50.7% are female. Minors make up 12.3% of the population, and seniors make up 27.4%.

Historical population

Year	Pop.	±%
1861	539	—
1871	587	+8.9%
1881	663	+12.9%
1901	902	+36.0%
1911	1,049	+16.3%
1921	1,060	+1.0%
1931	1,169	+10.3%
1936	1,238	+5.9%

Year	Pop.	±%
1951	1,496	+20.8%
1961	1,557	+4.1%
1971	1,501	−3.6%
1981	1,570	+4.6%
1991	1,636	+4.2%
2001	1,625	−0.7%
2011	1,619	−0.4%
2021	1,443	−10.9%

Source: ISTAT

=== Immigration ===
As of 2025, immigrants make up 9.6% of the total population. The 5 largest foreign countries of birth are Romania, Morocco, France, Pakistan, and Argentina.
