= Dan Antonioli =

American businessman

- Born: 1960 (age 65–66)
- Education: University of California, Berkeley; California State University, Sonoma
- Occupation: Builder

Dan Antonioli (born 1960) is a builder and owner of two evolving intentional communities.

== Biography ==
He was born in 1960 and received his B.A. from University of California, Berkeley and M.A. from California State University, Sonoma, in psychology. He created 611 in Ghosttown, Oakland, California and The Mendocino project, in Laytonville, California. He is a licensed general contractor, a registered green builder with the National Association of Remodeling Industry Professionals (NARI) and a member of the United States Green Building Council (USGBC), the American Solar Energy Association, the Northern California Solar Energy Association, and the Eastern Oregon Renewable Energy Association.
