= Antoniano =

Antoniano may refer to:

- Antoniano (name)
- CA Antoniano, a Spanish football team based in Lebrija, Province of Seville
- Institute of Antoniano, an educational and charitable institution in Bologna, Italy

== See also ==
- Piccolo Coro dell'Antoniano, children's choir in Bologna, Italy
- Antoniana (disambiguation)
- Antonino (disambiguation)
