= E. M. Antoniadi =

Greek-French astronomer

Eugène Michel Antoniadi
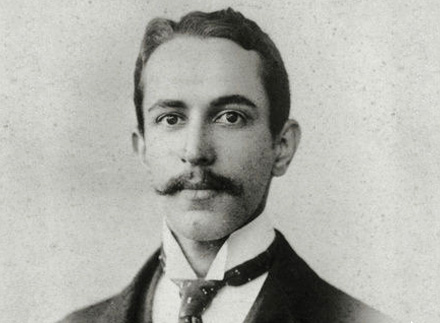
- Antoniadi in 1893
- Born: 1 March 1870; Constantinople, Ottoman Empire
- Died: 10 February 1944 (aged 73); Paris, France
- Occupation: Astronomer
- Years active: 1893–1944
- Known for: Maps of Mars and Mercury
- Notable work: La planète Mars, 1659-1929

Signature
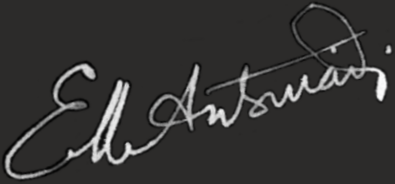

Eugène Michel Antoniadi (Greek: Ευγένιος Αντωνιάδης; 1 March 1870 – 10 February 1944) was a Greek-French astronomer. He is known for creating the Antoniadi scale as well as for his observations of the planets, and was a major opponent of the notion of Martian canals. He created some of the most detailed maps of Mars at the time, and many features on the planet are still known by the names he suggested. He also created the first map of Mercury, though it turned out to be incorrect.

== Biography ==
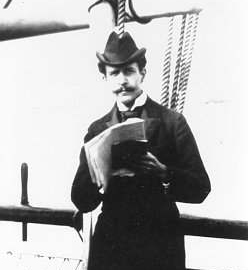
Antoniadi

Antoniadi was born in Istanbul (Constantinople) but spent most of his adult life in France after being invited there by Camille Flammarion.

He became a Fellow of the Royal Astronomical Society on 10 February 1899, and in 1890 he became one of the founding members of the British Astronomical Association (BAA). In 1892, he joined the BAA's Mars Section and became that section's Director in 1896.

He became a member of the Société astronomique de France (SAF) in 1891.

Flammarion hired Antoniadi to work as an assistant astronomer in his private observatory in Juvisy-sur-Orge in 1893. Antoniadi worked there for nine years. In 1902, he resigned from both the Juvisy observatory and from SAF.

Antoniadi rejoined SAF in 1909. That same year, Henri Deslandres, Director of the Meudon Observeratory, provided him with access to the Grande Lunette (83-cm Great Refractor)

He became a highly reputed observer of Mars, and at first supported the notion of Martian canals, but after using the 83 centimeter telescope at Meudon Observatory during the 1909 opposition of Mars, he came to the conclusion that canals were an optical illusion. He also observed Venus and Mercury.

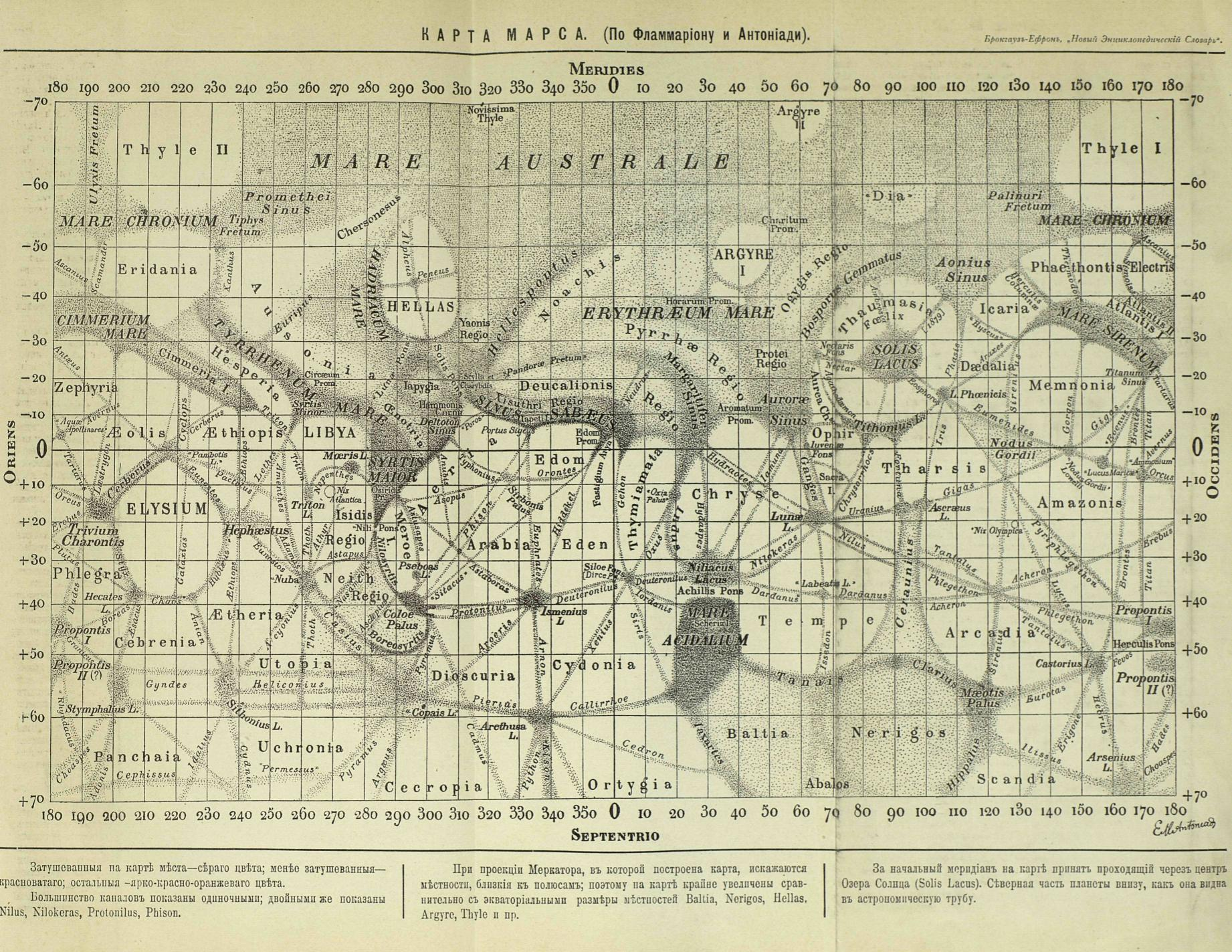
Map of Mars channels by Antoniadi and Camille Flammarion

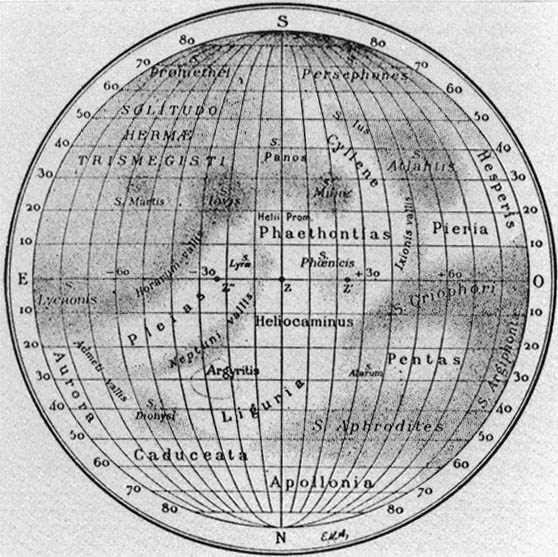
Antoniadi's 1934 map of Mercury

He made the first map of Mercury, but his maps were flawed by his incorrect assumption that Mercury had synchronous rotation with the Sun. The first standard nomenclature for Martian albedo features was introduced by the International Astronomical Union (IAU) when they adopted 128 names from the 1929 map of Antoniadi named La Planète Mars.

He is also famed for creating the Antoniadi scale of seeing, which is commonly used by amateur astronomers. He was also a strong chess player. His best result was equal first with Frank Marshall in a tournament in Paris in 1907, a point ahead of Savielly Tartakower.

He died in Paris, France, aged 73.

== Name ==
His full name was Eugène Michel Antoniadi (Greek: Ευγένιος Μιχαήλ Αντωνιάδης, romanized: Evgénios Michaíl Antoniádis), however he was also known as Eugenios Antoniadis. His name is also sometimes given as Eugène Michael Antoniadi or even (incorrectly) as Eugène Marie Antoniadi.

== Awards and honors ==
- 1925 – Prix Jules Janssen from the Société astronomique de France.
- 1926 – Prix Guzman of 2,500 Francs from the Académie des Sciences.
- 1932 – Prix La Caille from the Académie des Sciences.
- 1970 – Antoniadi crater on the Moon named in his honor by the International Astronomical Union.
- 1973 – Antoniadi crater on Mars named in his honor by the International Astronomical Union.
- 1976 – Antoniadi Dorsum wrinkle ridge on Mercury named in his honor by the International Astronomical Union.

== Publications ==
Antoniadi was a prolific writer of articles and books (the Astrophysics Data System lists nearly 230 that he authored or co-authored). The subjects included astronomy, history, and architecture. He frequently wrote articles for L'Astronomie of the Société astronomique de France, Astronomische Nachrichten, and the Monthly Notices of the Royal Astronomical Society, among others.

Notable works include:

- Sur une Anomalie de la phase dichotome de la planète Vénus (Paris: Gauthier-Villars, (s. d.)).
- La planète Mars, 1659-1929 (Paris: Hermann & Cie, 1930).
- La Planète Mercure et la rotation des satellites. Etude basée sur les résultats obtenus avec la grande lunette de l'observatoire de Meudon (Paris: Gauthier-Villars, 1934).

== See also ==
- Demetrios Eginitis

== Bibliography ==
- McKim, Richard J. (1993a). "The Life and Times of E.M. Antoniadi, 1870-1944. Part I: an Astronomer in the Making" (PDF). Journal of the British Astronomical Association. 103 (4). Bibcode:1993JBAA..103..164M. Archived from the original (PDF) on 15 April 2023.
- McKim, Richard J. (1993b). "The Life and Times of E.M. Antoniadi, 1870-1944. Part II: The Meudon years" (PDF). Journal of the British Astronomical Association. 103 (5). Bibcode:1993JBAA..103..219M. Archived from the original (PDF) on 15 April 2023.
- Sheehan, William; Bell, Jim (2021). The Planet Mars A History of Observation and Discovery. Phoenix, Arizona: University of Arizona Press. ISBN 9780816546862.
