= Ragazza emancipata =

EP by CCCP - Fedeli alla linea
- Released: 1990
- Recorded: 1990
- Genre: Punk rock
- Length: 12:00
- Label: Stampa Alternativa
- Producer: CCCP - Fedeli alla linea

CCCP - Fedeli alla linea album chronology
Canzoni, Preghiere, Danze del II Millennio - Sezione Europa (1989)	Ragazza emancipata (1990)	Epica Etica Etnica Pathos (1990)

CCCP - Fedeli alla linea single chronology
"Tomorrow (Voulez vous un rendez vous)" (1989)	"Ragazza emancipata" (1990)	"Amandoti" (1990)

Ragazza emancipata ("Emancipated Girl") is an EP by the Italian punk rock band CCCP - Fedeli alla linea, released in 1990.

== Track listing ==
1. "Ragazza emancipata
2. "Tien An Men"
3. "Trafitto (Remix)"

== Personnel ==
- Giovanni Lindo Ferretti – vocals
- Massimo Zamboni – guitar
- Umberto Negri – bass
- Danilo "Artista del Popolo" Fatur – vocals
- Annarella Giudici "Benemerita soubrette" Giudici – vocals

== See also ==
- CCCP discography
- Consorzio Suonatori Indipendenti (C.S.I.)
- Per Grazia Ricevuta (P.G.R.)
