= 1964/1985 Affinità-divergenze fra il compagno Togliatti e noi – Del conseguimento della maggiore età =

Studio album by CCCP
- Released: 1986
- Recorded: Reggio Emilia, Italy, 1985
- Genre: Post-punk, punk rock
- Length: 37:08
- Label: Attack Punk Records

CCCP chronology
| 1964/1985 Affinità-divergenze fra il compagno Togliatti e noi – Del conseguimento della maggiore età (1986) | Socialismo e Barbarie (1987) |

1964/1985 Affinità-divergenze fra il compagno Togliatti e noi – Del conseguimento della maggiore età (1964/1985 Affinities-Divergences between comrade Togliatti and us – Of the coming of age) is the debut album by the Italian punk rock band CCCP Fedeli alla linea. It was first released on vinyl by Attack Punk Records, an independent label, in 1986, and then re-released on CD by Virgin Records in 1988.

This album is considered by many music critics one of the masterpieces of contemporary Italian music, and a milestone for the whole European punk movement.

== Track listing ==
| No. | Title | Length |
|---|---|---|
| 1. | "CCCP" | 2:21 |
| 2. | "Curami" | 4:30 |
| 3. | "Mi Ami? (Remiscelata)" | 2:48 |
| 4. | "Trafitto" | 2:54 |
| 5. | "Valium Tavor Serenase" | 1:17 |
| 6. | "Morire" | 3:24 |
| 7. | "Noia" | 3:46 |
| 8. | "Io Sto Bene" | 3:10 |
| 9. | "Allarme" | 5:06 |
| 10. | "Emilia Paranoica (Remiscelata)" | 7:45 |

- "Mi Ami?" and "Emilia Paranoica" originally appeared respectively on the "Ortodossia II" and "Compagni, Cittadini, Fratelli, Partigiani" EPs, and are included in this album as remixed versions.

== Personnel ==
- Giovanni Lindo Ferretti – vocals
- Massimo Zamboni – guitar
- Umberto Negri – bass, drum machine
- Danilo Fatur – “Artista del popolo”
- Annarella Giudici – “Benemerita soubrette”

== See also ==
- CCCP discography
- Consorzio Suonatori Indipendenti (C.S.I.)
- Per Grazia Ricevuta (PGR)
- Punk rock
