= Ecco i miei gioielli =

Ecco i miei gioelli

Compilation album by CCCP Fedeli alla linea
- Released: 1992
- Recorded: 80s
- Genre: Punk rock
- Length: 46:35
- Label: Virgin
- Producer: I dischi del mulo

Ecco i miei gioielli is a compilation album by the Italian punk rock band CCCP Fedeli alla linea released in 1992.

== Track listing ==
1. "And the radio plays"
2. "Inch'Allah - ça va" (alt. version - sung by Giovanni Ferretti)
3. "Curami" (remix)
4. "A ja ljublju SSSR"
5. "Trafitto" (remix)
6. "Tu menti"
7. "Annarella"
8. "Noia" (live in Baveno, 1989
9. "Svegliami (Perizia Psichiatrica Nazionalpopolare)"
10. "Amandoti"
11. "Le qualità della danza"
12. "Palestina (15/11/1988)"
13. "È vero"
14. "Rozzemilia"

== Personnel ==
- Annarella Giudici - Benemerita soubrette, vocals
- Giovanni Lindo Ferretti - vocals
- Ignazio Orlando - bass, keyboards, drums
- Carlo Chiapparini - guitar
- Massimo Zamboni - guitar
- Danilo Fatur - Artista del popolo, vocals
- Silvia Bonvicini -, vocals
- Umberto Negri - bass (1982-1985)

== See also ==
- CCCP discography
- Consorzio Suonatori Indipendenti (C.S.I.)
- Per Grazia Ricevuta (PGR)
- Punk rock
