= Susanna Ceccardi =

Italian politician (born 1987)

Susanna Ceccardi MEP
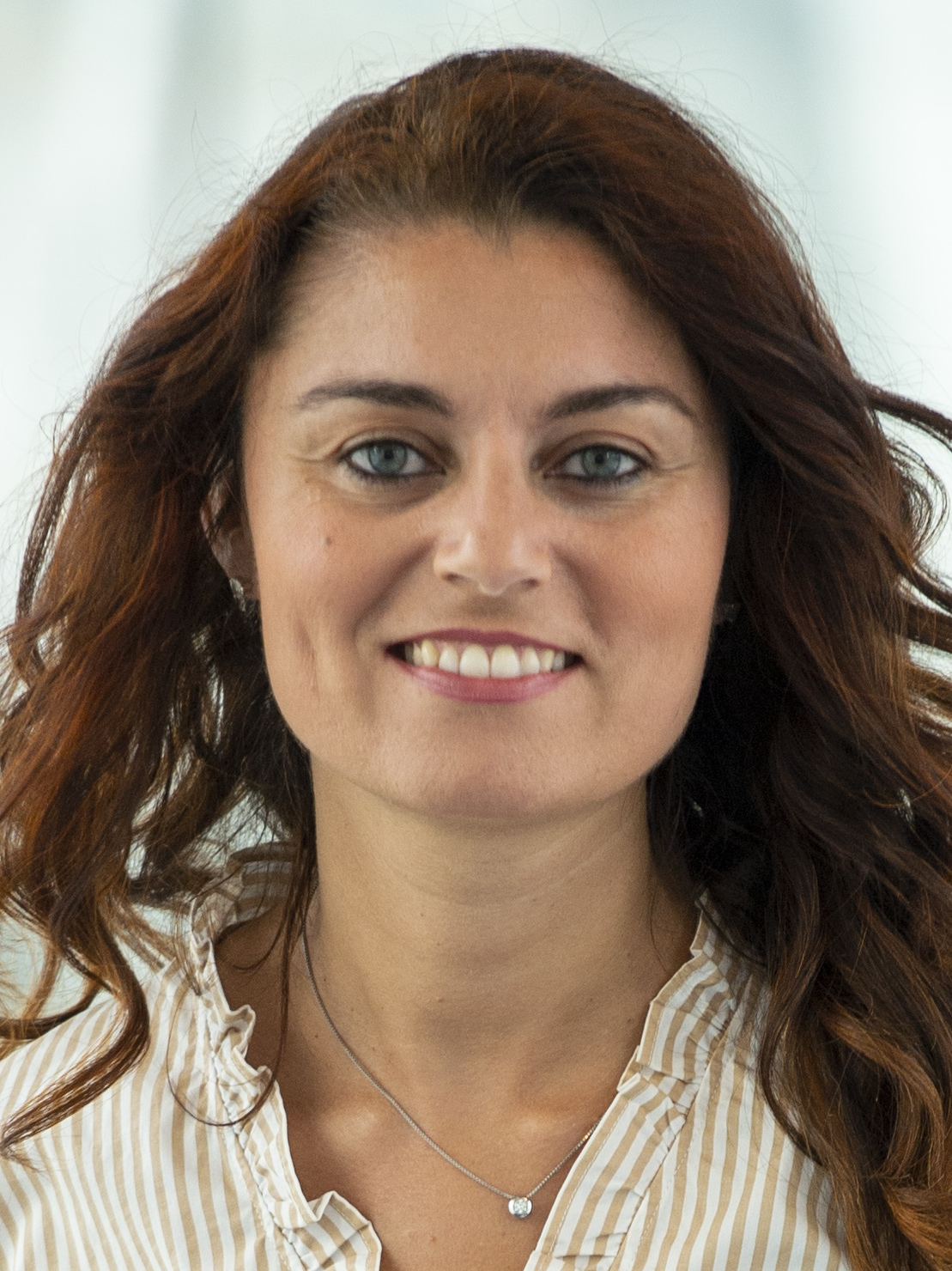
- Susanna Ceccardi in 2019

Member of the European Parliament
- Incumbent
- Assumed office 2 July 2019
- Constituency: Central Italy

Mayor of Cascina
- In office 21 June 2016 – 27 June 2019
- Preceded by: Alessio Antonelli
- Succeeded by: Dario Rollo

Personal details
- Born: 19 March 1987 (age 39) Pisa, Italy
- Party: Lega (since 2020); Lega Nord (until 2020)
- Domestic partner: Andrea Barabotti
- Children: 1
- Education: University of Pisa (School of Law)

Susanna Ceccardi (born 19 March 1987) is an Italian politician. In May 2019, she was elected to the European Parliament. She served as mayor of Cascina from June 2016 to June 2019.

== Family and early life ==
Ceccardi was born in Pisa, Tuscany. Her mother is Maria Iacoponi. The family of her father (Roberto) originated from the hamlet of Vaglie in the comune of Ligonchio and she is a distant cousin through her paternal grandfather of the singer Iva Zanicchi. Francesco Ceccardi, brother of her paternal grandfather, died in the hamlet of Busana on the Apennine Mountains, killed by the army of the Italian Social Republic in January 1945 and is locally honored by a way-side cross with a plaque. Her family was left-wing but her parents moved their vote to the Northern League in the 1990s.

She graduated at classical high school and she later enrolled at School of Law at the University of Pisa, where she began her political activity as student representative. She graduated in 2024.

== Political career ==
=== Cascina ===
She was elected at the municipal council of Cascina in 2011 and she participated as a regular guest in the political talk show Announo on the national channel La7.

She was a candidate for the 2015 Tuscan regional election but did not get a council seat.

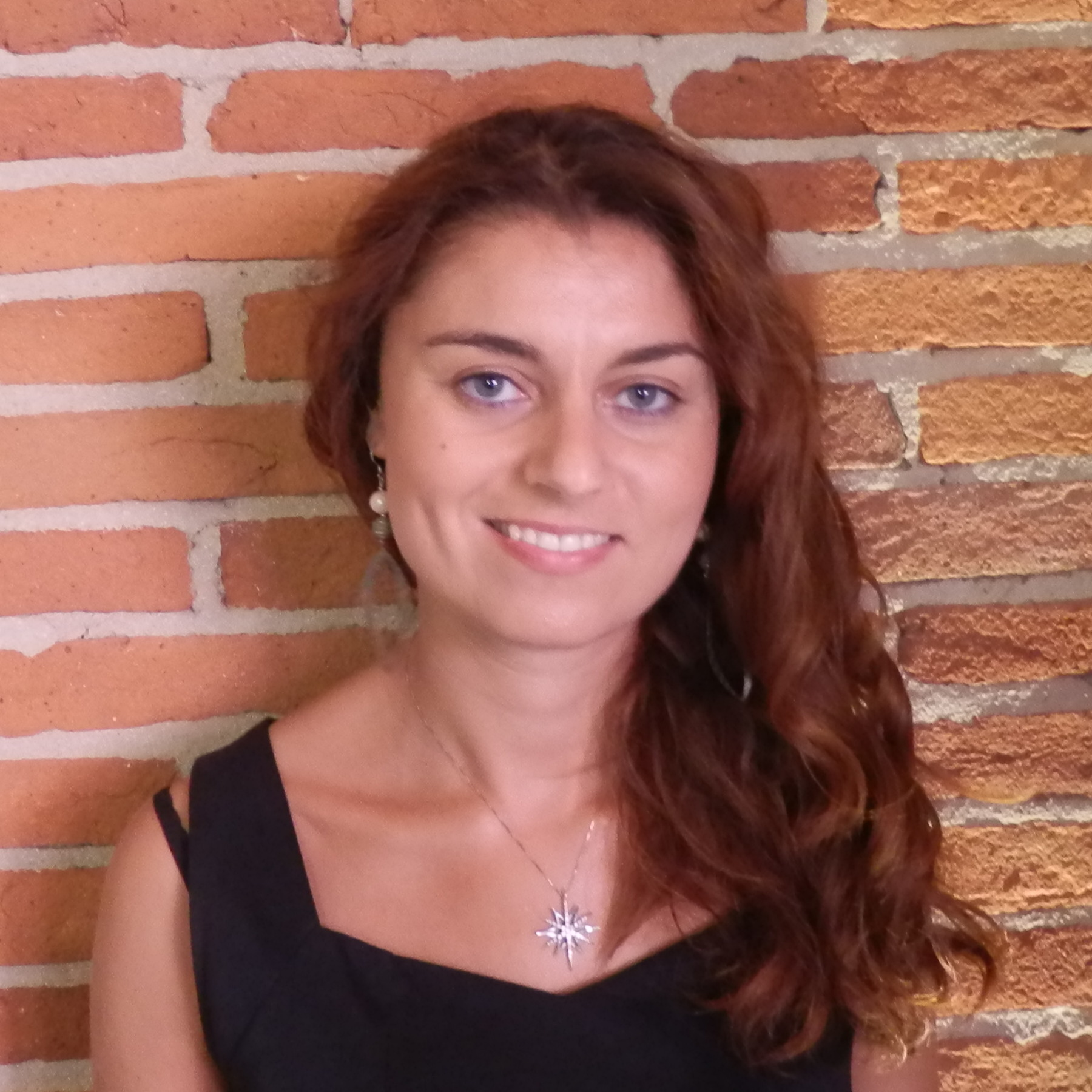
Susanna Ceccardi (2016)

During the 2016 Italian local elections she obtained at the Cascina mayoral election 28.4% in the first round and 50.3% in the run-off, while her party got 21.3%. Immigration was a core topic of the campaign.

At the time her victory interrupted 70 years of left-wing local leadership, and Cascina became the first large municipality won by Lega Nord Toscana in the region and the second in general after Bagni di Lucca in the 1990s. in a region which is a traditional left stronghold. She was also the only member of Lega Nord elected mayor in the whole region before Siena, Pisa and Massa followed suit in the June 2018 local elections.

The result was not considered local (Note: Matteo Salvini, who at time was only leader of the Northern League, gave himself news of her victory to the national audience during the television late night show Porta a Porta.) and was seen as a key example of the political shift fuelled by the topic of immigration, which later occurred at the 2018 Italian general election.

=== Role in Tuscany ===
Susanna Ceccardi's role was considered crucial for the elections in the local constituencies of her assessors Edoardo Ziello and Rosellina Sbrana in March 2018 to the Italian Chamber of Deputies and the Senate, respectively, and for the victory of the right-wing candidate Michele Conti at the mayoral election in the bigger neighboring comune of Pisa a few months later in the 2018 Italian local elections. In Autumn 2018 she was appointed special commissioner (head) of the party in Tuscany.

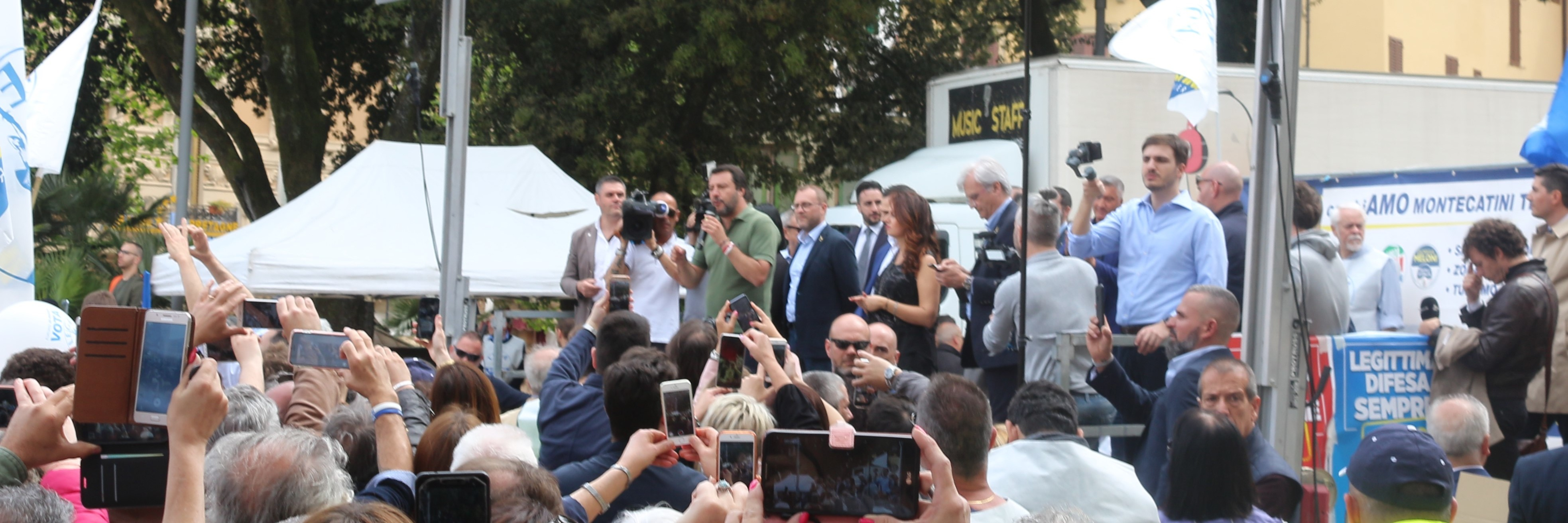
Susanna Ceccardi with Matteo Salvini in May 2019 at an election rally for the following European and municipal elections, in Montecatini Terme.

=== Growing national role and European Elections ===
In September 2018, she joined the staff of Salvini once he had become the Italian Minister of the Interior.

In April 2019, she became an official candidate for her party at the 2019 European Parliament election in Italy She was elected with 48,239 preferences. becoming the youngest MEP of her party. Her former deputy Dario Rollo became mayor after she accepted her role of MEP.

=== Expedition in Spain during COVID-19 pandemics ===
During the COVID-19 pandemic, she organized with party colleagues Gian Marco Centinaio (former minister of agriculture) and Gianna Gambaccini (a doctor and local assessore in Pisa) a "rescue expedition" traveling by bus from Italy to Barcelona where they collected 46 Italian citizens (mostly from Tuscany). blocked in the Canary Islands with no direct flight to Italy because of the increasing local travel restrictions and reduction of flights and routes. The tourists were visited by Gambaccini before the start of the travel, and equipped with protective masks.

Ceccardi stated she undertook the initiative after not receiving specific reply from the Italian authorities. The Italian Minister of Foreign Affairs Luigi Di Maio later asked the rescue mission to be stopped when the bus was already in France.

The initiative was criticized by the left parties as unnecessary, but also by other local politicians of Brothers of Italy.

=== 2020 Tuscan regional elections ===
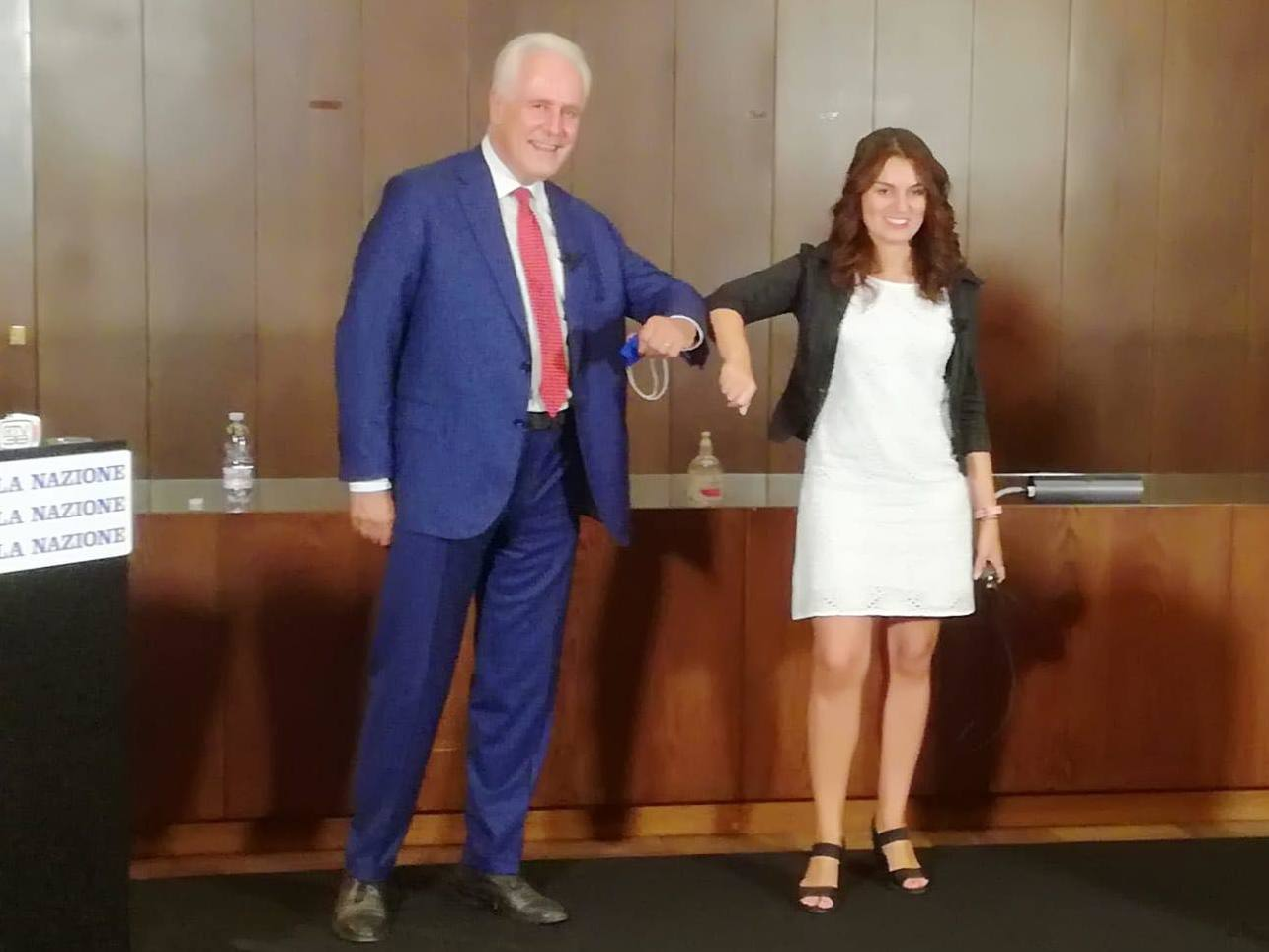
Eugenio Giani with Susanna Ceccardi (top candidates for the upcoming regional elections) at the July 2020 electoral debate in the main building of La Nazione in Florence.

After the good performance of the possible allied parties at the 2019 European elections, Ceccardi declared herself as a possible candidate for the president of Tuscany at the incoming regional elections of 2020. However, possible allies criticized the weak performance of the center-right coalition at the runoff votings of the 2019 municipal elections under her strategical leadership and criticisms of her activism emerged also inside her own party.

In March 2020, Ceccardi was proposed as candidate for the center-right coalition to the 2020 Tuscan regional election. The candidature was formalized for the whole center-right coalition in June 2020, when the date of the election was confirmed after the COVID-19 lockdown.

== Political views ==
She has been described as an example of younger Italian politicians supporting a more critical view of the European Union especially compared with the older right-wing officeholders of the previous decades.

In 2016, she gave honorary citizenship to Magdi Cristiano Allam, a former Muslim who converted to Christianity and is noted for his criticism of Islamic extremism. She opposes the construction of mosques and, in exchange for the celebration of the Eid al-Fitr in a public space by the local Senegalese community, she required that they "firmly condemned" all acts of violence induced by Islamic fundamentalism. Ceccardi consider that "regulating immigration is a moderate position"

In April 2019, during Liberation Day, she expressed her critical views about the less debated aspects of the Italian resistance movement.

== Personal life ==
In March 2019, she made public that she was expecting a baby with her partner Andrea Barabotti, a member of the Lega from Massa, due in September 2019. She expressed the possibility to name her future daughter Kinzica after Kinzica de' Sismondi, a medieval heroine who according to the legend it is said to have defended the town of Pisa from the invasion of the Saracens. Kinzika was born in Pisa on 28 September.

She is a friend of Pisan singer Andrea Bocelli.
