= Collagna =

Collagna Culâgna (Emilian)
- Frazione
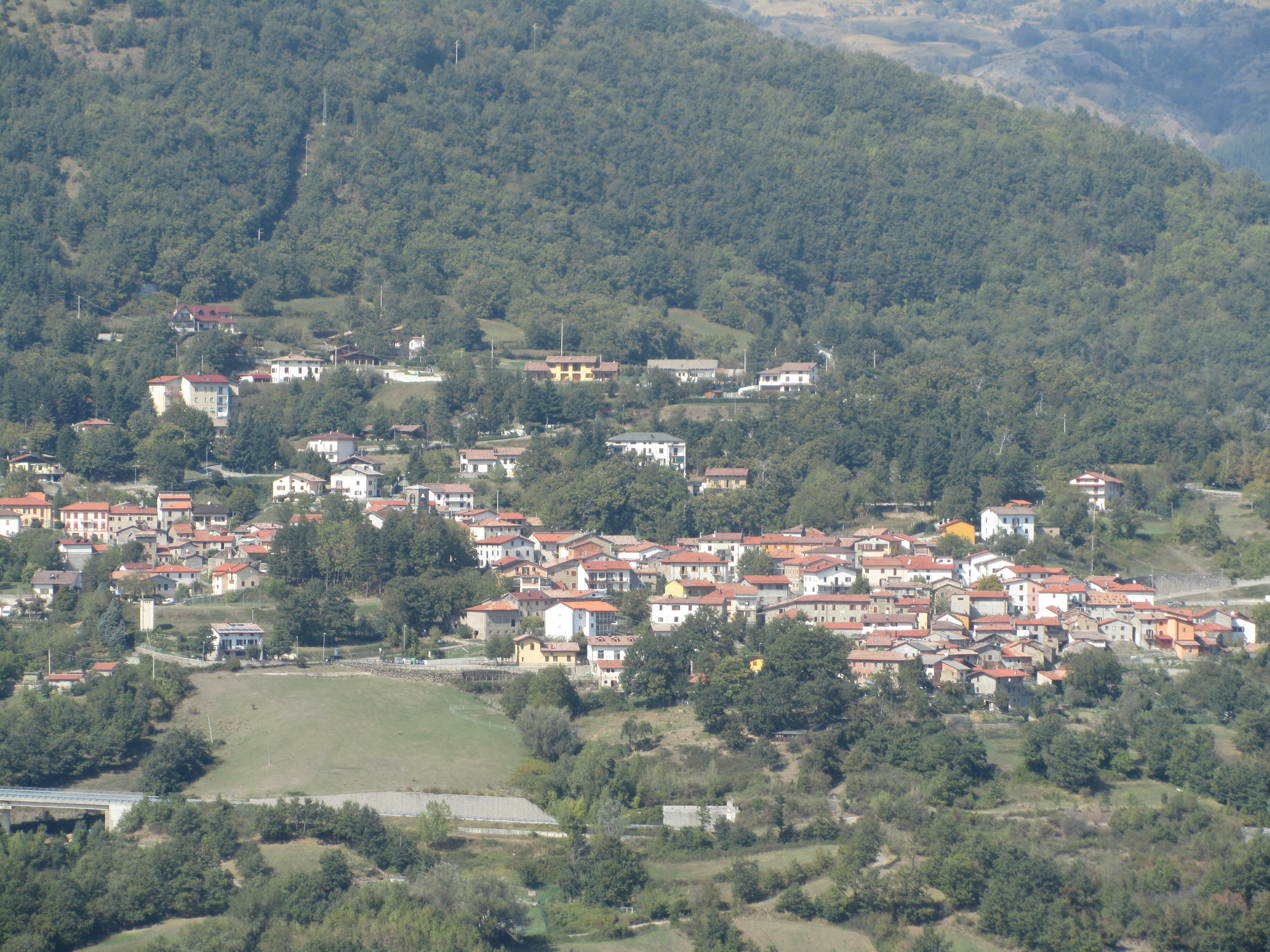

- Location of Collagna in Italy
- Coordinates: 44°21′N 10°16′E
- Country: Italy
- Region: Emilia-Romagna
- Province: Reggio Emilia (RE)
- Comune: Ventasso

Area
  - Total: 69.82 km^{2} (26.96 sq mi)
- Elevation: 830 m (2,720 ft)

Population (31 December 2015)
  - Total: 942
  - Density: 13.5/km^{2} (34.9/sq mi)
- Demonym: Collagnesi
- Time zone: UTC+1 (CET)
  - Summer (DST): UTC+2 (CEST)
- Postal code: 42037
- Dialing code: 0522

Collagna (Emilian: Culâgna) is a frazione (borough) of the comune (municipality) of Ventasso in the Province of Reggio Emilia in the Italian region Emilia-Romagna, located about 90 kilometres (56 mi) west of Bologna and about 50 kilometres (31 mi) southwest of Reggio Emilia. It was a separate comune until 1 January 2016, when it was merged with Busana, Ligonchio and Ramiseto.

Collagna borders the Tuscan municipalities of Comano (MS), Fivizzano (MS) and the former municipality of Sillano (LU).

== People ==
- Giovanni Lindo Ferretti (b. 1953), singer-songwriter, born in Cerreto Alpi
