= Socialismo e barbarie =

Studio album by CCCP
- Released: 1987
- Recorded: 1987
- Genre: Punk rock, post-punk
- Length: 38:24
- Label: Virgin Records
- Producer: Ignazio Orlando and CCCP Fedeli alla linea

CCCP chronology
1964/1985 Affinità-Divergenze fra il Compagno Togliatti e Noi – Del Conseguimento della Maggiore Età (1985)	Socialismo e barbarie (1987)	Canzoni, Preghiere, Danze del II Millennio – Sezione Europa (1989)

Socialismo e barbarie (Socialism and Barbarism) is the second studio album released by the Italian punk rock band CCCP Fedeli alla linea in 1987. It is a less cohesive work than their first album, that ran the gamut from Middle Eastern music to the Soviet national anthem, from Catholic hymns to feedback workouts.

The title turn over the phrase "Socialisme ou Barbarie" (Socialism or Barbarism) from Rosa Luxemburg used in a 1916 essay, 'The Junius Pamphlet'.

"Manifesto" and the remake of the "National Anthem of the Soviet Union", "A ja ljublju SSSR" (with different lyrics) are strongly influenced by their pro-Soviet ideology.

"Sura", "Radio Kabul" about the Soviet–Afghan War (1979–1989), and "Inch'Allah ça va" are influenced by the Islamic culture and Middle Eastern music.

"Tu menti" is an attack on the nihilist punk rock of the Sex Pistols with explicit references to "Anarchy in the UK" and "Liar", and mimics the riff from the song "Submission".

"Libera me Domine" opens a new series of songs dedicated to religion, Christianity and Catholic hymns.

The album was re-released on CD by Virgin Records in 1988 with two additional songs, both from the 1987 7" single Oh! Battagliero.

== Track listing ==
=== Original LP version ===
1. "A ja ljublju SSSR"
2. "Per me lo so"
3. "Tu menti"
4. "Rozzemilia"
5. "Stati di agitazione"
6. "Libera me Domine"
7. "Manifesto"
8. "Hong Kong"
9. "Sura"
10. "Radio Kabul"
11. "Inch'Allah – ça va"

=== CD version ===
1. "A ja ljublju SSSR"
2. "Per me lo so"
3. "Tu menti"
4. "Rozzemilia"
5. "Stati di agitazione"
6. "Libera me Domine"
7. "Manifesto"
8. "Hong Kong"
9. "Sura"
10. "Radio Kabul"
11. "Inch'Allah ça va"
12. "Oh! Battagliero"
13. "Guerra e pace"

== Personnel ==
- Giovanni Lindo Ferretti – vocals
- Massimo Zamboni – guitar
- Ignazio Orlando – bass guitar, keyboards, drum machine
- Carlo Chiapparini – guitar
- Danilo Fatur – "Artista del popolo" ("People's Artist")
- Annarella Giudici – "Benemerita soubrette" ("Well-deserved soubrette")

== See also ==
- CCCP discography
- Consorzio Suonatori Indipendenti (C.S.I.)
- Per Grazia Ricevuta (PGR)
