= Epica Etica Etnica Pathos =

Studio album by CCCP
- Released: 1990
- Recorded: Emilian countryside, Italy, 1990
- Genre: Art rock; post-punk
- Length: 67:07
- Label: Virgin
- Producer: CCCP - Fedeli alla linea; Gianni Maroccolo

CCCP chronology
Canzoni, Preghiere, Danze del II Millennio - Sezione Europa (1988)	Epica Etica Etnica Pathos (1990)

Epica Etica Etnica Pathos (Epic, Ethics, Ethnic, Pathos) is the last studio album by the Italian punk rock band CCCP - Fedeli alla linea, released in 1990.

It sounds completely different from their previous works, and could be considered as the "real" first album by C.S.I. The short, fast, hard music, with stripped-down instrumentation and punk rock melodies were substituted by a more melancholic and declamatory vein.

The album sessions made use of original, and unique techniques for recording instruments and sound effects in rock music. It was directly played, and recorded in a farmhouse in the Emilia Romagna countryside. The use of those techniques, the surrounding ambient, the use of the natural echo made out a really soft sound instead of the clean and sometimes empty uniformity of a usual studio recording.

CCCP reached their zenith with this album, with songs like the complex suites "MACISTE contro TUTTI", or "Aghia Sophia", "Depressione caspica" and "Annarella".

In 2004, "Amandoti" was covered by Gianna Nannini. "Annarella" was covered by La Crus in their album Crocevia.

== Track listing ==
All tracks written by Ferretti/Zamboni/Magnelli/Maroccolo, except where indicated.

1. "Aghia Sophia" - 9:28
2. "Paxo de Jerusalem" - 4:32
3. "Sofia" - 1:09
4. "Narko'$?" (includes "Baby Blue") - 9:53
5. "Campestre" - 3:48
6. "Depressione caspica" - 5:13
7. "In occasione della festa" (Traditional) - 1:04
8. "«Amandoti» (sedicente cover)" (Ferretti/Zamboni) - 2:51
9. "L'andazzo generale" - 4:21
10. "Al Ayam" - 3:55
11. "Appunti di un viaggiatore nelle terre del socialismo reale" - 5:00 (the real track duration is 0:05)
12. "Mozzill'o Re" - 4:22
13. "Campestre II" - 0:42
14. "Maciste contro tutti" - 11:26
15. "Annarella" - 4:24

== Personnel ==
- Giovanni Lindo Ferretti – vocals
- Massimo Zamboni – guitar
- Gianni Maroccolo – bass
- Francesco Magnelli – keyboards
- Giorgio Canali – guitar
- Ringo De Palma – drums
- Danilo Fatur "Artista del Popolo" Fatur – vocals
- Annarella "Benemerita soubrette" Giudici – vocals

== See also ==
- CCCP discography
- Consorzio Suonatori Indipendenti (C.S.I.)
- Per Grazia Ricevuta (P.G.R.)
