= Canzoni, preghiere, danze del II millennio – Sezione Europa =

Canzoni, Preghiere, Danze del II Millennio – Sezione Europa

Studio album by CCCP
- Released: 1989
- Recorded: 1989
- Genre: Post-punk, synthpop
- Length: 44:28
- Label: Virgin
- Producer: Ignazio Orlando

CCCP chronology
Socialismo e Barbarie (1987)	Canzoni, Preghiere, Danze del II Millennio – Sezione Europa (1989)	Epica Etica Etnica Pathos (1990)

Canzoni, Preghiere, Danze del II Millennio – Sezione Europa (English: Songs, Prayers, Dances of the 2nd Millennium - Section Europe) is the third studio album released by the Italian punk rock band CCCP Fedeli alla linea in 1989.

It signals their change to a very electropop music style. Keyboard instead of guitar becomes the most important instrument in most of their compositions. Their sound is now strongly influenced by Middle Eastern music and becomes more and more soft than the previous ones. The original sociopolitical emphasis is now replaced by mystical overtones, and their industrial hardcore with a far less revolutionary synthpop.

The cover features a picture of the Virgin Mary with the Holy Child.

The first track, "Il Testamento del Capitano", is a live performance of a traditional song-chorus by the Alpini, an elite mountain warfare unit of the Italian Army, that was booed by the spectators.

"Fedele alla lira?" is a reply to the fans that nicknamed them “CCCP fedeli alla lira” when the band signed for Virgin in 1987.

"Madre" is a song dedicated to the Virgin Mary. For the reason above stated, Famiglia Cristiana, an Italian weekly magazine owned by a Roman Catholic publishing group and focused on Christian topics, for the first time, reviewed one of their albums, and interviewed some of the band's members.

== Track listing ==
1. "Il Testamento del Capitano"
2. "Svegliami (Perizia Psichiatrica Nazionalpopolare)"
3. "Huligani Dangereux"
4. "B.B.B."
5. "Fedele alla lira?"
6. "Roco · Roço · Rosso"
7. "Le qualità della danza"
8. "È vero"
9. "Palestina (15/11/1988)"
10. "Madre"
11. "Conviene"
12. "And the radio plays"
13. "Vota FATUR"
14. "Reclame"

== Personnel ==
- Giovanni Lindo Ferretti - vocals
- Massimo Zamboni - guitar
- Annarella Giudici - “Benemerita soubrette”
- Danilo Fatur - “Artista del popolo”
- Ignazio Orlando - bass, keyboards, drum machine
- Carlo Chiapparini - guitar

== See also ==
- Consorzio Suonatori Indipendenti (C.S.I.)
- Per Grazia Ricevuta (PGR)
