= Ortodossia =

EP by CCCP Fedeli alla linea
- Released: 1984
- Recorded: 1984
- Genres: Punk rock, new wave, hardcore punk
- Length: 8:00
- Label: Attack Punk Records
- Producer: CCCP Fedeli alla linea

Ortodossia is an EP by the Italian punk rock band CCCP Fedeli alla linea released in 1984.

== Track listing ==
1. "Live in Pankow"
2. "Spara Jurij"
3. "Punk Islam"

== Personnel ==
- Giovanni Lindo Ferretti - vocals
- Massimo Zamboni - guitar
- Umberto Negri - bass
- Danilo Fatur - Artista del popolo
- Annarella - Benemerita soubrette

== See also ==
- CCCP discography
- Consorzio Suonatori Indipendenti (C.S.I.)
- Per Grazia Ricevuta (PGR)
- Punk rock
