= Ortodossia II =

EP by CCCP Fedeli alla linea
- Released: 1985
- Recorded: 1985
- Genre: Punk rock
- Length: 10:00
- Label: Attack Punk Records
- Producer: CCCP Fedeli alla linea

Ortodossia II is an EP by the Italian punk rock band CCCP Fedeli alla linea released in 1985. It was a re-release of their first EP Ortodossia, that was released on 1984, with an additional track "Mi Ami?".

== Track listing ==
1. "Live in Pankow"
2. "Mi ami?"
3. "Spara Jurij"
4. "Punk Islam"

== Personnel ==
- Giovanni Lindo Ferretti - vocals
- Massimo Zamboni - guitar
- Umberto Negri - bass
- Danilo Fatur - Artista del popolo
- Annarella - Benemerita soubrette

== See also ==
- CCCP discography
- Consorzio Suonatori Indipendenti (C.S.I.)
- Per Grazia Ricevuta (PGR)
- Punk rock
