= Compagni, cittadini, fratelli, partigiani =

Compagni, Cittadini, Fratelli, Partigiani

EP by CCCP Fedeli alla linea
- Released: 1985
- Genre: Punk rock
- Length: 12:00
- Label: Attack Punk Records

Compagni, Cittadini, Fratelli, Partigiani is the third EP released by the Italian punk/art rock band CCCP Fedeli alla linea. It was first released on vinyl by Attack Punk Records and re-released on CD by Virgin Records along with the Ortodossia II EP. Its title comes from the first verse of the 1960 ballad "Per i Morti di Reggio Emilia" by the Italian composer Fausto Amodei, which is dedicated to the demonstrators killed by the police during a protest against the Tambroni government.

== Track listing ==
1. "Militanz" — 1:59
2. "Sono Come Tu Mi Vuoi" — 4:30
3. "Morire" — 3:24
4. "Emilia Paranoica" — 7:45

== Personnel ==
- Giovanni Lindo Ferretti - vocals
- Massimo Zamboni - guitar
- Umberto Negri - bass guitar, drum machine
- Danilo Fatur - Artista del popolo
- Annarella Giudici - Benemerita soubrette
