= Fausto Amodei =

Italian folk singer-songwriter and musicologist (1934–2025)

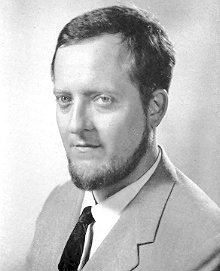
- Amodei in 1968

Background information
- Born: Fausto Amodei; 18 June 1934; Turin, Italy
- Died: 17 September 2025 (aged 91) Turin, Italy
- Genres: Folk music
- Occupation: Singer-songwriter
- Instruments: Vocals; guitar
- Years active: 1958–2005
- Labels: DNG; I dischi del sole; Albatros; Block Nota

Fausto Amodei (18 June 1934 – 18 September 2025) was an Italian folk singer-songwriter and musicologist.

== Life and career ==
Amodei began his musical career in 1958, founding the band Cantacronache. In his songs, he used irony and satire, a style inspired by the French singer Georges Brassens. In the early 1960s he became active in the magazine Nuovo Canzoniere Italiano and in 1968 he was elected member of the Italian parliament as a member of the Italian Socialist Party of Proletarian Unity (PSIUP). The singer Francesco Guccini cited Amodei in interviews and books as one of his principal influences as a composer.

One of Amodei's most famous songs is Per i morti di Reggio Emilia (For the Dead of Reggio Emilia), dedicated to the demonstrators killed by the police during a protest on 7 July 1960. In 1985 the Italian punk-rock band CCCP titled their third EP with the first verse of this ballad: Compagni, Cittadini, Fratelli, Partigiani.

== Death ==
Amodei died in Turin on 18 September 2025, at the age of 91.

== Discography ==
The discography is listed in a chronological order.

- 1958 – La gelida manina (78 rpm)
- 1963 – Il barone e la pastora (EP)
- 1963 – Le canzoni di Fausto Amodei 1 (EP)
- 1963 – Le canzoni di Fausto Amodei 2 (EP)
- 1964 – Il tarlo/Il gallo (45 rpm)
- 1964 – Lettera dalla caserma/Una vita di carta (45 rpm)
- 1965 – Canzoni didascaliche (EP)
- 1969 – Sciopero interno/Nei reparti della FIAT (45 rpm)
- 1971 – Cantacronache 3 (album)
- 1972 – Se non-li conoscete (album)
- 1974 – L'ultima crociata (album)
- 2005 – Per fortuna c'è il cavaliere (album)

== Literature ==
- Margherita Zorzi: "Fausto Amodei – Canzoni di satira e di Rivolta" – 2008, ISBN 978-88-95514-62-8
