= Amandoti =

1990 single by CCCP - Fedeli alla linea

Single by CCCP - Fedeli alla linea

from the album Epica Etica Etnica Pathos
- Language: Italian
- B-side: "Annarella"
- Written: 1987
- Released: 1990
- Recorded: Emilian countryside, Italy, 1990
- Genre: Post-punk; indie rock; folk punk; art rock
- Length: 2:50
- Label: Virgin Dischi
- Composer: Massimo Zamboni
- Lyricist: Giovanni Lindo Ferretti
- Producer: Gianni Maroccolo

CCCP - Fedeli alla linea singles chronology
"Ragazza emancipata" (1990)	"Amandoti" (1990)

Music video
- "Amandoti" on YouTube

"Amandoti" ("Loving You") – in its full album title "«Amandoti» (sedicente cover)", i.e. "'Loving You' (Self-Proclaimed Cover)" – is a song by Italian punk band CCCP - Fedeli alla linea, written by its members Massimo Zamboni (music) and Giovanni Lindo Ferretti (lyrics). The group's final single before its disbandment, it was released for radio airplay only through Virgin Dischi in 1990, and was included in the album Epica Etica Etnica Pathos from the same year.

Widely regarded as CCCP's most popular track, "Amandoti" was brought to mainstream success by Gianna Nannini in 2004 and has since been covered by numerous other artists, with the band's version being re-issued via Universal Music Italy in 2014.

== Background ==
Inspired by the death of CCCP leader Giovanni Lindo Ferretti's grandmother, the lyrics of "Amandoti" were written in his Emilian hometown of Cerreto Alpi. They describe love as a physically exhausting endeavour, yet a feeling one is never ready to give up – pushing the singer to beg that their loved one never leave.

The song was first performed at a 1987 live show by the group's female singer Annarella Giudici, and it was only three years later that Ferretti recorded his version to be included in Epica Etica Etnica Pathos.

== Personnel ==
- Giovanni Lindo Ferretti – lead vocals
- Annarella Giudici – backing vocals
- Danilo Fatur – backing vocals
- Massimo Zamboni – electric guitar, mixing engineering
- Giorgio Canali – electric guitar, mixing engineering, recording engineering, production assistance
- Gianni Maroccolo – electric bass guitar, arrangement, mixing engineering, recording engineering, production
- Francesco Magnelli – keyboards, arrangements
- Ringo De Palma – drums

== Gianna Nannini version ==
"Amandoti"

Promotional single by Gianna Nannini

from the album Perle
- Language: Italian
- Released: 9 January 2004
- Recorded: Abensberg, Germany, 2003
- Genre: Rock
- Length: 4:06 (album version); 3:36 (radio edit)
- Label: Polydor
- Composer: Massimo Zamboni
- Lyricist: Giovanni Lindo Ferretti
- Producer: Christian Lohr

Gianna Nannini singles chronology
"Uomini a metà" (2002)	"Amandoti" (2004)	"Una luce" (2004)

Music video
- "Amandoti" on YouTube

In 2004, Italian rock singer Gianna Nannini chose to cover "Amandoti" on her album Perle, with her rendition intended as an address to a lover rather than a relative. It was with this version, arranged in a more classical rock style than the original, that the song achieved mainstream popularity, becoming much more commonly associated with Nannini than CCCP themselves.

=== Certifications ===
Region	Certification	Certified units/sales
Italy (FIMI) Sales from 2009	Gold	50,000^{‡}
^{‡} Sales+streaming figures based on certification alone.

== Other versions ==
Since Nannini's version, "Amandoti" has been covered on several occasions, particularly in televised performances, by other artists. Notable covers include:

- Noemi's version during her participation in X Factor in 2009, upon suggestion from her coach Morgan. Numerous other contestants have since performed the song on the show.
- Emma's guest duet with Nannini on Amici in 2017.
- Måneskin's duet with Manuel Agnelli on the special cover night of the Sanremo Music Festival 2021, which they eventually won.
- Amanda Lear's version on her 2021 album Tuberose, after being Måneskin's initial choice for their Sanremo duet but having declined the opportunity for financial reasons. Lear had previously duetted with CCCP in 1988 on a punk rock rendition of her hit "Tomorrow".
- Laura "LoRR" Salvi's version, which was included in a 2023 commercial for Alfa Romeo Tonale.

=== Settembre version ===
"Amandoti"

Single by Settembre

from the EP Vertebre
- Language: Italian; Neapolitan
- Released: 20 February 2024
- Recorded: 2024
- Genre: Pop
- Length: 2:00
- Label: Isola degli Artisti
- Composer: Massimo Zamboni
- Lyricists: Giovanni Lindo Ferretti; Andrea Settembre
- Producer: Bnjmn

Settembre singles chronology
"Lacrime" (2023)	"Amandoti" (2024)	"Oro oro" (2024)

Music video
- "Amandoti" (audio) on YouTube

In late 2023, X Factor contestant Andrea Settembre covered "Amandoti" for one of the show's episodes, in a version with Neapolitan-language lyrics by himself replacing some of the lines. His performance was well received, and he opted to release it as a single the following February.

Settembre's version of "Amandoti" soon appeared among the top 200 tracks streamed on both Apple Music and Spotify in Italy, and was included in the soundtrack for the 2024 Netflix series Deceitful Love.
