= Settembre (singer) =

Italian singer-songwriter (born 2001)

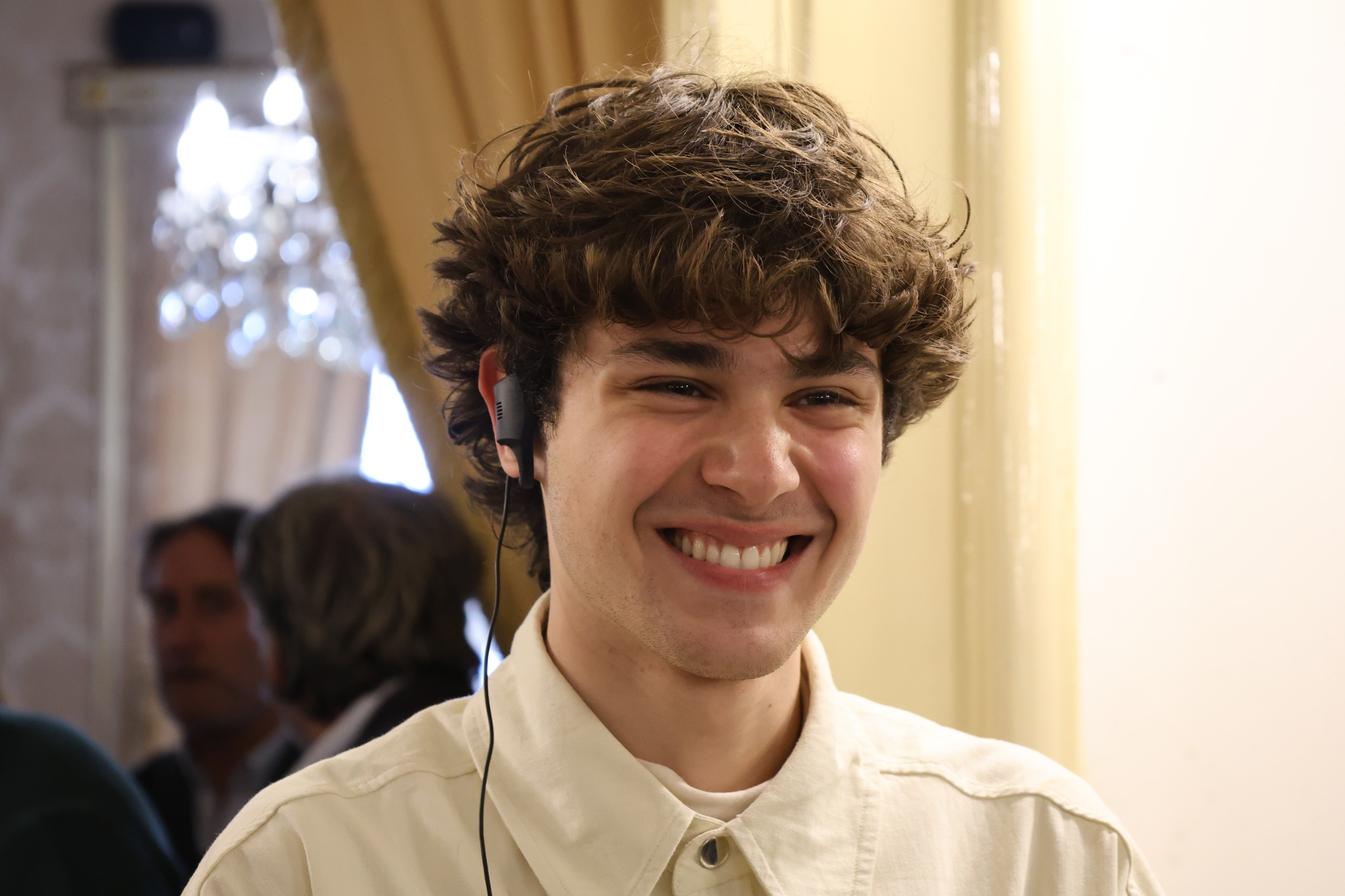
- Settembre in February 2025

Background information
- Born: Andrea Settembre; 9 October 2001 (age 25); Naples, Campania, Italy
- Genre: Pop
- Occupations: Singer; songwriter
- Years active: 2012–present
- Labels: Hokuto Empire; Isola degli Artisti; Warner Music Italy; Atlantic Records Italy
- Website: www.isoladegliartisti.it/andrea-settembre

Andrea Settembre (born 9 October 2001), known mononymously as Settembre, is an Italian singer-songwriter. He won the Newcomers' section of the Sanremo Music Festival 2025 with "Vertebre".

== Early life and education ==
Andrea Settembre was born in Naples to Paola Moriello and Enzo Settembre. He has an older brother, Ciro, and he grew up in the Colli Aminei borough of Naples. Settembre started to take dance classes at the age of 6. At the age of 12, he enrolled in a musical academy and started composing songs. He attended the liceo linguistico Comenio in Naples, and he later started studying speech therapy.

== Career ==
Settembre started his career as a radio speaker for Radio Immaginaria, a broadcaster entirely managed and hosted by teenagers. He debuted on stage at the Teatro Politeama in Naples, performing as part of the cast of a production of the musical Grease. In 2012, he appeared on the TV show Se stasera sono qui, and he performed at the 20th RAI Christmas Concert, broadcast on Rai 2. After launching his own YouTube channel, he released videos of his performances, singing covers as well as original songs. In 2013, he competed in the fourth season of Italian junior singing talent show Io canto, as a member of Claudio Cecchetto's team. He later appeared on the Italia 1 infotainment TV programme Fattore umano (2015).

In 2019, Settembre competed in the sixth series of The Voice of Italy. He auditioned with Khalid's "Location" and became a member of Gigi D'Alessio's team, but was eliminated during the battles. He also took part in contest events organized by radio broadcasters, such as Festival Show in 2018, which he won, and Deejay On Stage in 2022, reaching the final.

In 2023, he successfully auditioned for the seventeenth series of X Factor Italia, placing fifth overall and releasing the single "Lacrime". During the show, he was noted for his performance of "Amandoti" by CCCP, later recorded and released as a single and included in the soundtrack for the Netflix series Deceitful Love. The lyrics of his version feature Neapolitan-language lines.

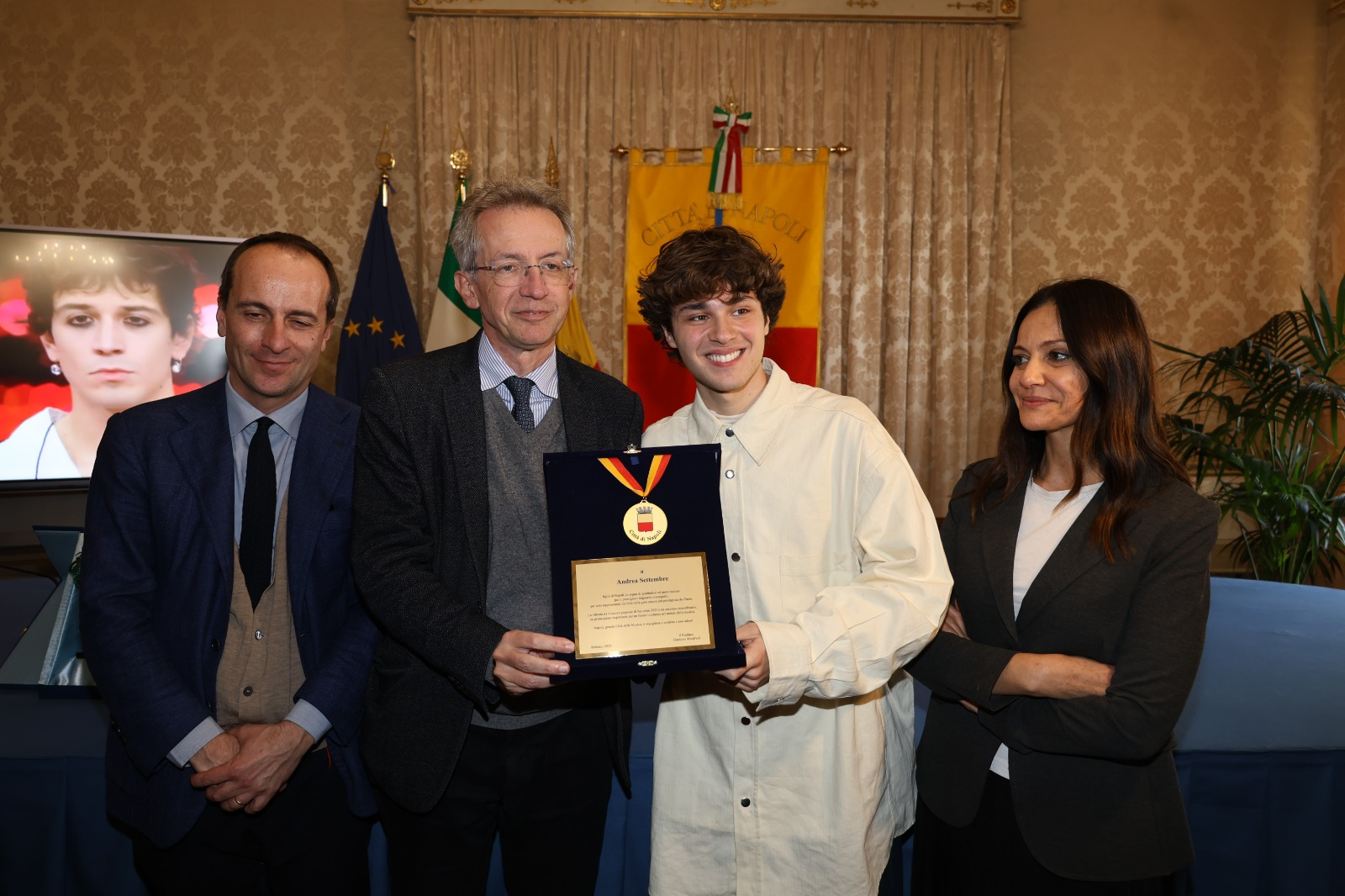
Settembre receiving his special award from the mayor of Naples Gaetano Manfredi

One year later, Settembre competed in Sanremo Giovani with the song "Vertebre", being among the top four acts selected to take part in the Newcomers' section of the Sanremo Music Festival 2025. He won the competition, additionally receiving the Critics Award, the Press Room Award and the Nuovo IMAIE Award. Upon his Sanremo victory, Settembre was also awarded a plaque by the mayor of Naples, Gaetano Manfredi. "Vertebre" reached 15 million streams in Italy and marked the singer's first concert tour in the country. He was then selected by RAI to form part of the Italian jury for the Eurovision Song Contest 2025.

In July 2026, Settembre released his next single, "Due settimane", which was followed by "Lentiggini" in late September.

== Personal life ==
Settembre identifies as Catholic. He regularly prays as a form of meditation.

== Discography ==
=== Extended plays ===
List of EPs and with selected chart positions
Title	EP details	Peak chart positions
Title	EP details	ITA
Vertebre	Release date: 14 February 2025; Label: Isola degli Artisti; Formats: digital download, streaming	43

=== Singles ===
List of singles with chart positions and album name
Title	Year	Peak chart positions	Certifications	Album or EP
Title	Year	ITA	Certifications	Album or EP
"Selfie"	2016	—		Non-album singles
"Su"	2017	—		Non-album singles
"Soli insieme"	2020	—		Non-album singles
"Bum bum"	2020	—		Non-album singles
"Lacrime"	2023	—		Vertebre
"Amandoti"	2024	—		Vertebre
"Oro oro"	2024	—		Vertebre
"Fiori nel cemento" (Jelecrois feat. Settembre)	2024	—		Non-album single
"Vertebre"	2024	31	FIMI: Gold	Vertebre
"Due settimane"	2026	—		Non-album singles
"Lentiggini"	2026	—		Non-album singles
"—" denotes singles that did not chart or were not released.

== Television ==
Year	Broadcaster	Title	Role	Notes
2012	La7	Se stasera sono qui		Variety show
2012	Rai 2	Concerto di Natale	Performer of "Jingle Bell Rock"	Christmas concert
2013	Canale 5	Io canto	Contestant	Talent show (season 4)
2015	Italia 1	Fattore umano		Infotainment
2019	Rai 2	The Voice of Italy	Contestant	Talent show (season 6)
2023	Sky Uno/Now	X Factor	Contestant	Talent show (season 17)
2024	Rai 1	Sanremo Giovani	Contestant with "Vertebre"	Selection for annual music festival; selected
2025	Rai 1	Sanremo Music Festival	Contestant (Newcomers' section) with "Vertebre"	Annual music festival; winner
2025	Rai 1	L'eredità	Contestant	Quiz show; special episode devoted to Sanremo
2026	Rai 1	L'anno che verrà	Performer of "Vertebre"	New Year's concert
2026	Rai 1	The Voice Kids	Guest performer with "Amandoti"	Talent show (season 4)
