= Sonia Masini =

Italian politician (born 1953)

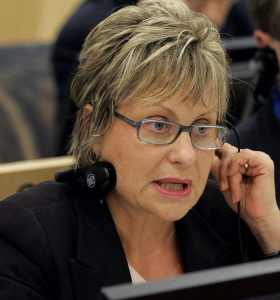

President of the Province of Reggio Emilia
- In office 24 June 2004 – 13 October 2014
- Preceded by: Roberto Ruini
- Succeeded by: Giammaria Manghi

Mayor of Ramiseto
- In office 25 July 1985 – 24 April 1995
- Preceded by: Nello Lusoli
- Succeeded by: Francesco Zambonini

Personal details
- Born: 4 May 1953 (age 73) Ramiseto, Province of Reggio Emilia, Italy
- Party: Italian Communist Party; Democratic Party of the Left; Democrats of the Left; Democratic Party
- Education: University of Parma

Sonia Masini (born 4 May 1953) is an Italian politician who served as president of the Province of Reggio Emilia from 2004 to 2014.

== Life and career ==
Masini was born in Ramiseto, province of Reggio Emilia, in 1953. She studied humanities at the University of Parma, graduating in 2018, and worked in social services and cultural activities in Reggio Emilia. She began her political career in the Italian Communist Party, and later jouned the Democratic Party of the Left and the Democrats of the Left, holding various party positions in the province.

Masini served as mayor of Ramiseto from 1985 to 1995 and was a member of the Reggio Emilia Provincial Council from 1990. She was vice president of the Province of Reggio Emilia from 2000 to 2004. In the 2004 provincial election, Masini was elected president of the province as the Olive Tree coalition's candidate, receiving 67.71% of the vote. She was re-elected in 2009 with 52.44% of the vote, defeating centre-right candidate Giuseppe Pagliani.

In December 2014, Five Star Movement senator Elisa Bulgarelli claimed in the Italian Senate that Masini's political career had been hindered because she had declined to attend a procession in Cutro, Calabria, in 2009, unlike other Reggio Emilia politicians including Graziano Delrio. Bulgarelli linked the event to the alleged influence of the Grande Aracri family, a prominent 'Ndrangheta clan. In connection with these events, Masini had been questioned by the Bologna District Anti-Mafia Directorate in 2012. In 2017, Masini testified in the Aemilia trial, where she discussed the political and institutional relationships between Reggio Emilia and the Calabrian community.
