= Vertebre =

Single by Settembre

from the EP Vertebre
- Language: Italian; Neapolitan
- Released: 19 November 2024
- Recorded: 2024
- Genre: Pop
- Length: 2:50
- Label: Warner Music Italy / ADA Music Italy; Isola degli Artisti
- Songwriters: Andrea Settembre; Laura Di Lenola; Manuel Finotti
- Producers: Bnjmn; Gorbaciof

Settembre singles chronology
"Fiori nel cemento" (2024)	"Vertebre" (2024)	"Due settimane" (2026)

Music video
- "Vertebre" (audio) on YouTube

"Vertebre" is a song by Italian singer-songwriter Settembre, co-authored by the singer alongside Laura Di Lenola and Manuel Finotti and released on 19 November 2024 – via Warner Music Italy and Isola degli Artisti – as the fourth single from the eponymous EP Vertebre. It served as Settembre's entry in the Sanremo Giovani contest and was among the four songs to advance to the Newcomers' section of the Sanremo Music Festival 2025, which it ultimately won as well as receiving the Critics Award, the Press Room Award and the Nuovo IMAIE Award.

Since its Sanremo victory, the song went on to be streamed over 15 million times in Italy. Settembre has described "Vertebre" as his way to convey his generation's struggle with the emotions and frailties they go through at their age.

== Charts ==
=== Weekly charts ===
Weekly chart performance for "Vertebre"
Chart (2025)	Peak position
Italy (FIMI)	31
Italy Airplay (EarOne)	47

== Certifications ==
Certifications for "Vertebre"
Region	Certification	Certified units/sales
Italy (FIMI)	Gold	100,000^{‡}
^{‡} Sales+streaming figures based on certification alone.
