= Roberto Ruini =

Italian politician (born 1964)

President of the Province of Reggio Emilia
- In office 8 May 1995 – 24 June 2004
- Preceded by: Ascanio Bertani
- Succeeded by: Sonia Masini

Personal details
- Born: 18 September 1964 (age 61) Sassuolo, Province of Modena, Italy
- Party: Italian People's Party
- Occupation: Entrepreneur

Roberto Ruini (born 18 September 1964) is an Italian politician who served as president of the Province of Reggio Emilia from 1995 to 2004.

== Life and career ==
Ruini was born in Sassuolo, province of Modena, in 1964. He studied at the Achille Peri Musical High School in Reggio Emilia, graduating in 1982, and subsequently worked as a professional musician. From 1987 to 1994, he was president of the provincial section of the Christian Associations of Italian Workers in Reggio Emilia. He entered politics in 1994, joining the Italian People's Party.

Ruini was elected president of the Province of Reggio Emilia in April 1995. He was re-elected in 1999 with 63.28% of the vote as the candidate of a centre-left coalition comprising the Democrats of the Left, the Italian People's Party, The Democrats, the Italian Democratic Socialists, the Party of Italian Communists and the Federation of the Greens.

After leaving politics, Ruini pursued a career in business and media. He founded PMG in 2007 and later became head of Starlight, the company organising the Giro d'Italia Women. His wife, Giuliana Torelli, died on 12 August 2020, aged 57, after a long illness.
