= Cantacronache =

Cantacronache is a contemporary folk Italian band formed in Turin in 1958 by Fausto Amodei, Michele Straniero, Giorgio De Maria, Emilio Jona, Sergio Liberovici, and Margot.

They were important in the Italian folk revival movement of the 1950s as one of the first such groups to use complex lyrics addressing social and political topics. Their modern sound helped them gain popularity among the youth of the Italian separatist movement.
