= Giorgio Zanni =

Italian politician (born 1988)

President of the Province of Reggio Emilia
- Incumbent
- Assumed office 31 October 2018
- Preceded by: Giammaria Manghi

Mayor of Castellarano
- Incumbent
- Assumed office 6 June 2016
- Preceded by: Gian Luca Rivi

Personal details
- Born: 5 July 1988 (age 38) Scandiano, Emilia-Romagna, Italy
- Education: University of Modena and Reggio Emilia

Giorgio Zanni (born 5 July 1988) is an Italian politician serving as president of the Province of Reggio Emilia since 2018. He has served as mayor of Castellarano since 2016.

In 2018, Zanni was elected president of the Province of Reggio Emilia with the Democratic Party-led centre-left coalition. In 2022, he was re-elected unopposed, with his candidacy supported by mayors and councillors from across the province. He has also served as regional president of UPI since 2024.
