= The Twenty Days of Turin =

1975 novel by Giorgio De Maria

- Author: Giorgio De Maria
- Translator: Ramon Glazov
- Publication place: Italian

The Twenty Days of Turin (Italian: Le venti giornate di Torino: inchiesta di fine secolo) is a 1975 novel by Italian writer and musician Giorgio De Maria. Ramon Glazov translated the book into English in 2016. It concerns a man in Turin who chooses to investigate a series of unexplained, violent events that occurred a decade before the setting of the novel.

== Themes ==
The horror in the novel has been cited as an allegory for the violence and terrorism that plagued Italy during the Years of Lead from the 1960s to the 1980s. In his foreword to his translation, Roman Glazov noted that prosecution attempts against fascist terrorist groups in Italy during the period "often ended in limbo" and that "in keeping with their real-world counterparts, the entities [behind the book's carnage] remain forever untouchable, hiding in plain sight, while authorities round up desperate, ill-fitting scapegoats." Glazov also noted that the methods used by those entities resembles the lone wolf attacks that surged in number in the 2000s.

The Library described in the novel has been described by several commentators as accurately foreshadowing the rise of social media.

== Reception ==
It has been referred to as "remarkably prescient" and has garnered comparisons to the works of H.P. Lovecraft and Thomas Pynchon. Vulture named the novel one of the 100 best dystopian novels in history.
