= Giorgio De Maria =

Italian musician and author

- Born: 1924; Turin
- Died: 2009 (aged 84–85)
- Occupations: Author, musician
- Writing career
- Notable work: The Twenty Days of Turin

Giorgio De Maria (1924–2009) was an Italian musician and author. He is best known for his 1977 novel The Twenty Days of Turin. He was part of the musical group Cantacronache.

== Biography ==
He was theater critic for l'Unità from 1958 to 1965. In 1958, he founded with Sergio Liberovici, Emilio Jona and Michele Straniero the avant-garde music group Cantacronache, a blatant reference to the collaboration between the worlds of culture and song (in the same years in France, figures and styles such as Jean-Paul Sartre and Jacques Prévert were uniting in the generation of Singer-songwriter). The group remained in business for four years, devoting itself to the recovery of political and Italian resistance movement songs, producing songs from the anarchist, socialist and even Italian Jacobin traditions. His love of Sarcasm was one of the souls of the group.

In 1963 he wrote for the Teatro Stabile di Torino Apocalypse made to measure, a comedy in three acts.

In the 1970s he worked for television (his was the text Proof of Appeal for Sipario) and at the fortnightly New Society.

In 2017, eight years after his death, news of an American edition of his novel The 20 Days of Turin translated by Ramon Glazov and published by Norton Publishing House, which, before then, had published only one Italian author, Primo Levi, caused a stir. The Australian journalist had been impressed by the book whose style mixed Edgar Allan Poe with Lovecraft and which seemed to predict, forty years in advance, the creation of Facebook. Indeed, the novel described the Library, a place to which citizens could bring a writing in which they described themselves, and where they could go to read biographies and wishes left by others.
