= List of presidents of the Province of Reggio Emilia =

President of the Province of Reggio Emilia
- Presidente della Provincia di Reggio Emilia
- Incumbent; Giorgio Zanni since 31 October 2018
- Term length: 4 years
- Inaugural holder: Biagio Borsiglia
- Formation: 1889

The president of the Province of Reggio Emilia is the head of the provincial government in Reggio Emilia, Emilia-Romagna, Italy. The president oversees the administration of the province, coordinates the activities of the municipalities, and represents the province in regional and national matters.

Since October 2018, the office has been held by Giorgio Zanni of the Democratic Party.

== List ==
=== Presidents of the Provincial Deputation (1889–1927) ===
No.	Portrait	Name	Term of office		Party
No.	Portrait	Name	Start	End	Party
1		Biagio Borsiglia	1889	1892	?
2		Carlo Morandi	1892	1902	?
3		Alessandro Cocchi	1902	1906	?
4		Igino Bacchi Andreoli	1906	1910	?
5		Alessandro Massoli	1910	?	?

=== Presidents of the Provincial Rectorate (1927–1945) ===
No.	Portrait	Name	Term of office		Party
No.	Portrait	Name	Start	End	Party
1		Mario Muzzarini	1929	1933	National Fascist Party
2		Giovanni Battista Pancini	13 February 1935	April 1936	National Fascist Party
3		Pellegrino Bertoldi	6 April 1936	1940	National Fascist Party
–		Michele Colitti (Prefectural commissioner)	10 October 1940	1942	National Fascist Party
–		Alberto Ramusani (Prefectural commissioner)	31 March 1942	1944	National Fascist Party
–		Giuseppe Scolari (Prefectural commissioner)	31 March 1944	1944	Republican Fascist Party
–		Alfonso Ercelli (Prefectural commissioner)	12 September 1944	1945	Republican Fascist Party

=== Presidents of the Provincial Deputation (1945–1951) ===
No.	Portrait	Name	Term of office		Party
No.	Portrait	Name	Start	End	Party
1		Camillo Ferrari	8 May 1945	1951	Italian Socialist Party

=== Presidents of the Province (1951–present) ===
No.	Portrait	Name	Term of office		Party
No.	Portrait	Name	Start	End	Party
1		Dante Montanari	16 July 1951	1956	Italian Socialist Party
1		Dante Montanari	1956	1960	Italian Socialist Party
1		Dante Montanari	1960	23 December 1964	Italian Socialist Party
2		Franco Ferrari	23 December 1964	1970	Italian Socialist Party
2		Franco Ferrari	1970	20 June 1972	Italian Socialist Party
3		Vittorio Parenti	20 June 1972	1975	Italian Socialist Party
3		Vittorio Parenti	1975	18 July 1980	Italian Socialist Party
4		Guglielmo Cusi	18 July 1980	5 January 1982	Italian Socialist Party
5		Ascanio Bertani	5 January 1982	26 July 1985	Italian Socialist Party
5		Ascanio Bertani	26 July 1985	5 July 1990	Italian Socialist Party
5		Ascanio Bertani	5 July 1990	8 May 1995	Italian Socialist Party
6		Roberto Ruini	8 May 1995	8 July 1999	Italian People's Party
6		Roberto Ruini	8 July 1999	24 June 2004	Italian People's Party
7		Sonia Masini	24 June 2004	8 June 2009	Democrats of the Left; Democratic Party
7		Sonia Masini	8 June 2009	13 October 2014	Democrats of the Left; Democratic Party
8		Giammaria Manghi	13 October 2014	31 October 2018	Democratic Party
9		Giorgio Zanni	31 October 2018	26 November 2022	Democratic Party
9		Giorgio Zanni	26 November 2022	Incumbent	Democratic Party

== Sources ==
- "Presidenti" (in Italian). Provincia di Reggio Emilia.
- "Storia amministrativa dell'ente". Ministero dell'Interno.
- Menichini, Piera (2005). "I presidenti delle Province dall'Unità alla Grande guerra: repertorio analitico". Storia Amministrazione Costituzione (13): 283–284.
