= Giammaria Manghi =

Italian politician (born 1970)

Undersecretary to the Regional Government of Emilia-Romagna
- In office September 2018 – December 2024
- President: Stefano Bonaccini

President of the Province of Reggio Emilia
- In office 13 October 2014 – 31 October 2018
- Preceded by: Sonia Masini
- Succeeded by: Giorgio Zanni

Mayor of Poviglio
- In office 8 June 2009 – 27 May 2019
- Preceded by: Stefano Carpi
- Succeeded by: Cristina Ferraroni

Personal details
- Born: 20 April 1970 (age 56) Parma, Emilia-Romagna, Italy
- Party: Democratic Party
- Education: University of Parma
- Occupation: Teacher

Giammaria Manghi (born 20 April 1970) is an Italian politician who served as president of the Province of Reggio Emilia from 2014 to 2018 and undersecretary of the Regional Government of Emilia-Romagna from 2018 to 2024. He also served as mayor of Poviglio from 2009 to 2019.

== Life and career ==
Manghi was born in Parma in 1970. He graduated in humanities from the University of Parma and taught literature at the Carrara Institute in Guastalla. A member of the Democratic Party, he served as a municipal councillor, assessor and deputy mayor of Poviglio before being elected mayor in June 2009.

In October 2014, Manghi was elected president of the Province of Reggio Emilia. He resigned in October 2018 after being appointed undersecretary to the Regional Government of Emilia-Romagna by president Stefano Bonaccini. In December 2024, following the formation of the new regional government, Manghi was appointed coordinator of sports policies.
