= CCCP - Fedeli alla linea =

Italian band

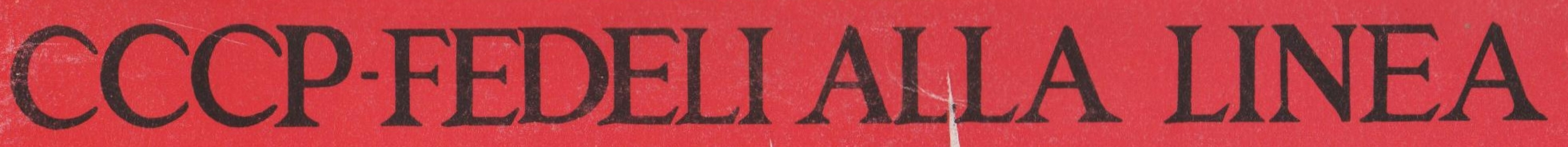
- CCCP - Fedeli alla linea

Background information
- Origin: Reggio Emilia, Italy
- Genres: Punk rock, new wave, post-punk, art rock
- Years active: 1982–1990, 2023–present
- Spinoffs: C.S.I., PGR
- Past members: Giovanni Lindo Ferretti; Massimo Zamboni; Annarella Giudici; Danilo Fatur; Umberto Negri; Carlo Chiapparini; Gianni Maroccolo; Francesco Magnelli; Ringo De Palma; Ignazio Orlando; Giorgio Canali; Zeo Giudici; Silvia Bonvicini
- Website: www.cccp-fedeliallalinea.it

CCCP - Fedeli alla linea (Italian pronunciation: [tʃittʃittʃipˈpi feˈdeːli alla ˈliːne.a]; also spelled without the hyphen) is an Italian punk band formed in 1982 in Berlin by vocalist Giovanni Lindo Ferretti and guitarist Massimo Zamboni. The band's style is self-defined by the members themselves as "Musica Melodica Emiliana—Punk Filosovietico" ("Emilian Melodic Music—Philo-soviet punk"). CCCP's works influenced dozen of artists such as Marlene Kuntz, Massimo Volume, and Offlaga Disco Pax.

Their name, CCCP, stems from the Cyrillic script for SSSR, Russian acronym for the Union of Soviet Socialist Republics, although pronounced following the Italian phonetics. CCCP left behind the stereotypes of punk rock, and reached for a genre-defying convergence of militant rock, industrial music, folk, electropop, Middle Eastern music, and even chamber music while delivering through their lyrics a bleak vision of humankind, also introducing elements of expressionist theatre and existentialist philosophy in their live shows.

== History ==
=== 1981–1983: Formation ===
Tra Carpi e Berlino c'è un legame speciale, perché a Carpi comincia l'autostrada del Brennero: perciò noi consideravamo Carpi come la periferia estrema di Berlino (Between Carpi and Berlin there is a special connection because the Brennero motorway starts in Carpi: therefore we considered Carpi the outermost suburb of Berlin)

— Ferretti

CCCP was formed in 1981 when Ferretti met Zamboni (both were from Reggio Emilia) in a discothèque in Kreuzberg (Berlin). Once they returned home they founded a new band called MitropaNK. During the following summer Ferretti, Zamboni and bassist Umberto Negri returned to Berlin: it was during that trip that CCCP - Fedeli alla Linea was born. The band members decided to use a drum machine instead of an actual drummer.

The name of the band celebrates the popular sub-culture of Emilia while also praising the Soviet Union, creating a link between Russia and the typical region of Emilia-Romagna.

During this period the band performed several times in West Germany, playing some underground clubs in Berlin such as the Kob or the Spectrumin. Their stay in Berlin influenced the sound of the band through the local industrial scene. East Berlin's culture and the Islamic community of the West side of the town also influenced Ferretti's lyrics.

The band's first concerts in Italy were met with a negative response from the crowd, leading the band to add two new members to the line-up: Annarella Giudici "Benemerita soubrette" (well-deserved soubrette), and a performer named Danilo Fatur. Annarella, Fatur, and for a little time Silvia Bonvicini (a second "Benemerita soubrette") contributed to characterize their concerts by playing comic-demential sketches during their gigs.

=== 1984–1985: First EPs ===
In 1984 the band released Ortodossia, their first EP on the independent label Attack Punk Records. In the same year the Ortodossia II EP was released, which included the same three songs already included in their first EP ("Live in Pankow", "Spara Jurij", and "Punk Islam") plus an additional fourth track ("Mi ami?"). 1985 saw the release of their third EP, Compagni, Cittadini, Fratelli, Partigiani.

The three EPs were produced and recorded by the band with very little money and few musical instruments in a single room set as a recording studio, near to a city tram line constantly disturbing the recording.

=== 1986: Debut album ===
Their first studio album, 1964/1985 Affinità-Divergenze fra il Compagno Togliatti e Noi - Del Conseguimento della Maggiore Età, was recorded during 1985 and published by Attack Punk Records in 1986. It reduced the visceral impact of hardcore while focusing on the eerie contrast between a harsh but spare instrumental background and Ferretti's delirious cut-up lyrics and Brecht-ian delivery. An eclectic stylistic range (from existential psychodrama to dance groove, from erotic cabaret to folk ballad) helped craft an oppressive atmosphere of angst and boredom, particularly in the centerpiece, "Emilia Paranoica".

This album is considered by many music critics one of the masterpieces of contemporary Italian music, and a milestone for the whole European punk movement. The album's sales induced Virgin Dischi, the Italian branch of Virgin to sign the band. Some of the band's fans saw this move as betrayal and nicknamed the band "CCCP - Fedeli alla lira" with lira (the old Italian currency before the introduction of Euro) instead of linea ('line' in the sense of 'party line', in line with the soviet theme).

=== 1987–1988: Signed for Virgin ===
In 1987 the band recorded and released their first single "Oh! Battagliero" and their second album, Socialismo e Barbarie, which was made with a relatively big budget if compared with the first one. It is a less cohesive work, that ran the gamut from Middle Eastern music to a rock version of the Soviet anthem, from Catholic hymns to feedback workouts.

In 1988 Virgin re-released Socialismo e Barbarie on CD, and their first EPs on the compilation Compagni, cittadini, fratelli, partigiani / Ortodossia II.

In the same year, CCCP released the single "Tomorrow (Voulez vous un rendez vous)", a cover version of a song by the singer and painter Amanda Lear; Amanda Lear sang on both the two tracks of the single.

=== 1989: Third album ===
The third album, Canzoni, Preghiere, Danze del II Millennio - Sezione Europa (1989), marked their musical evolution into electropop. Keyboard, instead of guitar, became the band's leading instrument. The album was more influenced by Middle Eastern music and was softer than in previous records. It substituted the original sociopolitical emphasis with mystical overtones, and their industrial hardcore with far less revolutionary synthpop.

=== 1989–1990: Litfiba and demise ===
In 1989 CCCP, Litfiba, and Rats went on tour in the Soviet Union (Moscow and Leningrad). In Moscow they played in a palace full of soldiers in uniform. The soldiers stood up when the band played, at the end of the concert, the Soviet hymn "A Ja Ljublju SSSR".

During that year guitarist Giorgio Canali, bassist Gianni Maroccolo, keyboardist Francesco Magnelli, and drummer Ringo De Palma (the last three left the Litfiba because of some artistic differences of opinion with the band's manager, Alberto Pirelli) joined and transformed the group.

The new group, now composed of eight members, recorded their fourth album, Epica Etica Etnica Pathos (best remembered for their final single "Amandoti"), in an abandoned 700' villa. This album signals another musical evolution for the band. CCCP reached their zenith with this album, a Frank Zappa-esque stylistic puzzle, which also stands as a personal musical encyclopedia, with complex suites such as "MACISTE contro TUTTI", their "swan song", and a transition to the new sonorities of the Consorzio Suonatori Indipendenti (C.S.I.), the new band born from the ashes of CCCP.

The acronym used for the new band name, C.S.I., evokes the new situation in the Soviet Union, with the Commonwealth of Independent States (CIS) (Italian: Comunità degli Stati Indipendenti (CSI)). With the creation of the CIS, the Soviet Union and (at the same time) the band ceased to exist. CCCP effectively disbanded the 3 October 1990, in the same date of the German reunification, and the members went on to other projects.

== Post-CCCP ==
When the Soviet Union collapsed, Ferretti and Zamboni decided to shuffle the line-up and adopt a less political stance. The renamed Consorzio Suonatori Indipendenti (C.S.I.) debuted with a set of songs from Ko del Mondo (Polygram, 1993). They rapidly evolved towards a form of chamber rock music with the mostly drum-less Linea Gotica (Polygram, 1996) that moved towards alternative rock in the following, and final, Tabula Rasa Elettrificata (Polygram, 1997) whose acronym is T.R.E., the number three in Italian. The album, born after a long-desired trip to Mongolia that some members of the band took interrupting the Linea Gotica tour is "probably the only rock album in the history of CCCP-CSI" according to the leader Ferretti, and became a unique case in the Italian recording industry, being able to climb the charts in a few weeks topping commercial giants like Be Here Now by Oasis.

When C.S.I. disbanded in 1999, Ferretti debuted solo with Co.Dex (2000), then formed Per Grazia Ricevuta (PGR) and released PGR (2002) that steered towards world music.

== Members ==
- Giovanni Lindo Ferretti (Cerreto Alpi, 9 September 1953): songwriter, vocals (1982–1990)
- Massimo Zamboni (Reggio Emilia, 1957): guitar, songwriter (1982–1990)
- Umberto Negri: bass, songwriter (1982–1985)
- Zeo Giudici: drums (1982–1983)
- Mirka Morselli - drums (1983)
- Annarella Giudici (born Antonella Giudici): "Benemerita soubrette" vocals (1984–1990)
- Danilo Fatur: "Artista del popolo" (people's artist) vocals (1984–1990)
- Silvia Bonvicini: vocals (1984–1985)
- Carlo Chiapparini: guitar (1986–1989)
- Ignazio Orlando: bass, keyboards, drums (1986–1989)
- Gianni Maroccolo (Manciano, 9 May 1960): bass (1989–1990)
- Francesco Magnelli: keyboards (1989–1990)
- Ringo De Palma (born Luca De Benedictis, Turin, 28 December 1963 – Florence, 1 June 1990): drums (1989–1990)
- Giorgio Canali (1958): guitar, programming (1989–1990)

== Discography ==
=== Studio albums ===
- 1964/1985 Affinità-Divergenze fra il Compagno Togliatti e Noi - Del Conseguimento della Maggiore Età, Attack Punk Records, red vinyl 1986, re-released in 1988 by Virgin
- Socialismo e Barbarie, Virgin 1987, re-released in 1988 on CD with two extra tracks.
- Canzoni, Preghiere, Danze del II Millennio - Sezione Europa, Virgin, 1989
- Epica Etica Etnica Pathos, Virgin, 1990

=== Live albums ===
- Live in Punkow, Virgin, 1996

=== Compilation albums ===
- Compagni, cittadini, fratelli, partigiani / Ortodossia II, Virgin, 1988
- Ecco i miei gioielli, Virgin, 1992
- Enjoy CCCP, Virgin, 1994
- Essential (CCCP), EMI, 2012

=== EPs ===
- Ortodossia, Attack Punk Records, red vinyl, 1984
- Ortodossia II, Attack Punk Records, red vinyl, re-released in 1985 by Virgin in black vinyl
- Compagni, Cittadini, Fratelli, Partigiani, Attack Punk Records, picture disc, re-released in 1985 by Virgin in black vinyl
- Ragazza emancipata, Stampa Alternativa, 1990

=== Singles ===
- "Oh! Battagliero" (1987), Virgin
- "Tomorrow (Voulez vous un rendez vous)" (featuring Amanda Lear) (1988), Virgin

=== Videos ===
- Tempi moderni, 1989

=== Theatre ===
- Allerghia, 1987–1988

== See also ==
- Consorzio Suonatori Indipendenti (C.S.I.)
- Per Grazia Ricevuta (PGR)
