= Andrea Barabotti =

Italian politician (born 1985)

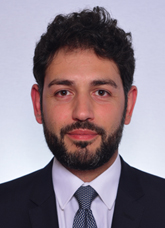
- Barabotti in 2022

Member of the Chamber of Deputies
- Incumbent
- Assumed office 13 October 2022
- Constituency: Tuscany – 01

Personal details
- Born: 14 September 1985 (age 40)
- Party: Lega

Andrea Barabotti (born 14 September 1985) is an Italian politician serving as a member of the Chamber of Deputies since 2022. He is the organizational manager of Lega Toscana and served as its campaign manager for the 2020 Tuscan regional election.

== Biography ==
After earning a diploma in accounting with a focus on information technology, he enrolled in the bachelor’s degree program in Public, Social, and Business Communication at the University of Pisa but did not complete his studies, choosing instead to pursue a career in politics.

A member of the Northern League from a young age, in 2008, at the age of 22, he ran for mayor of the town of Massa, receiving 1.32% of the vote but failing to win a seat on the city council.

In 2010, he became a staff member of the Northern League’s council group in the Regional Council of Tuscany. He later worked with the Lombardy Regional Government headed by Roberto Maroni, serving in the office of Gianni Fava, the regional councilor for agriculture.

In the 2013 general election, he was placed on the Northern League’s list for the Chamber of Deputies in the Tuscany constituency, but the party did not win any seats in the region. Two years later, in the 2015 Tuscan regional election, he ran for regional councilor in the Florence 1 constituency, receiving 1,414 votes but failing to win a seat.

In 2016, he was appointed head of local government affairs for the Northern League in Tuscany, and later became regional organizational director in 2018.

In the 2018 general election, he was the first of the Lega (political party) candidates not elected in the Toscana - 03 multi-member district. In the 2022 general election, he was elected to the Chamber of Deputies as the top candidate on the party list in the Toscana - 01 multi-member district. He is a member of the Committees on Productive Activities, Trade, and Tourism; Budget, Treasury, and Planning; the Bicameral Parliamentary Commission for Simplification; and the Parliamentary Commission of Inquiry into the Causes of the “Moby Prince” Shipwreck, of which he has served as Secretary since March 2024. Since October 2024, he has been responsible for managing relations between the Lega’s Tuscan members of parliament, the party’s regional councilors, and local government bodies.

On December 10, 2025, he introduced a constitutional bill to establish the requirement of Italian citizenship by birth for eligibility for the highest offices of the State and the Italian nationality law.
