= Ligonchio =

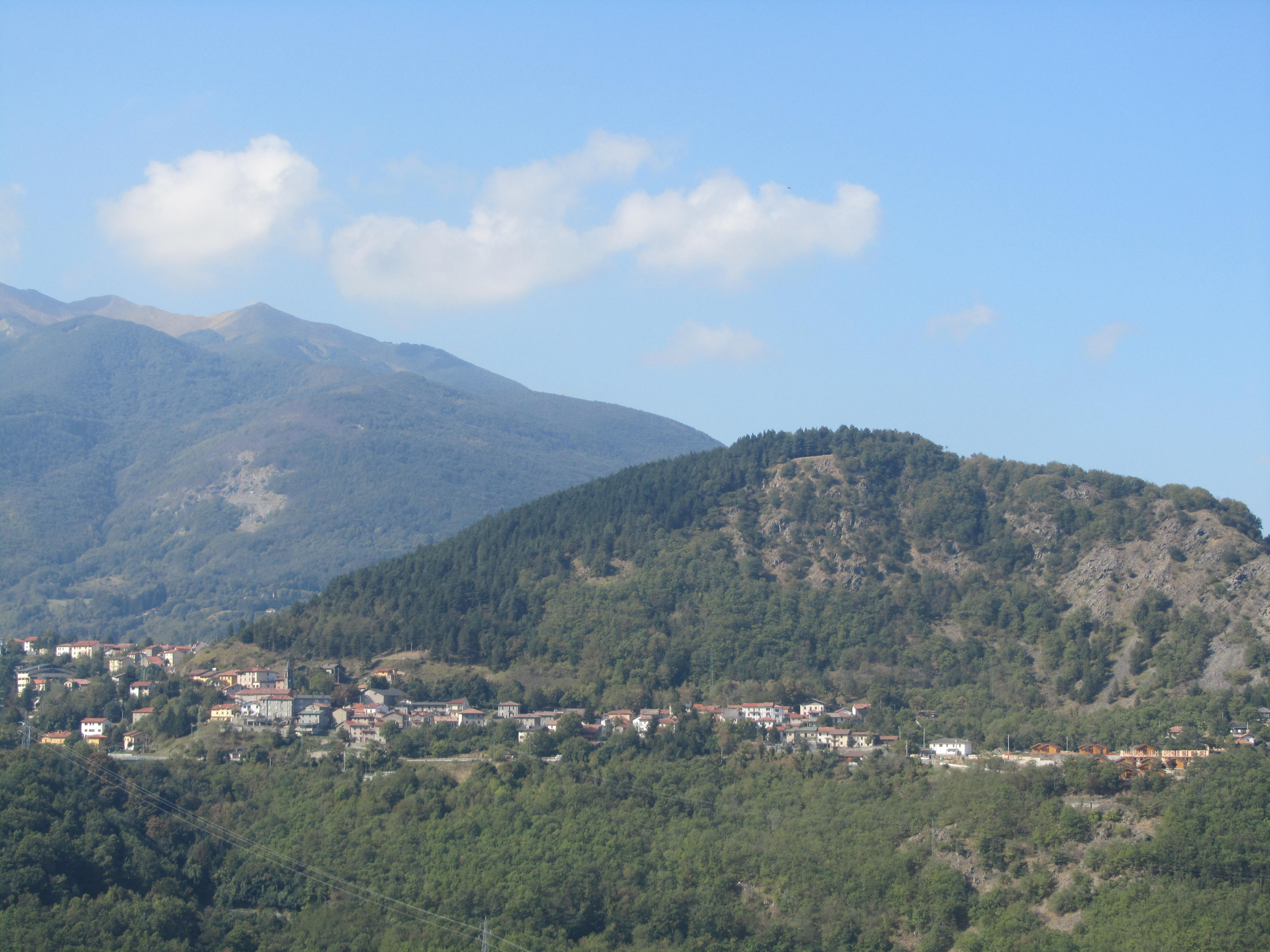
Ligonchio

Ligonchio (Italian: [liˈɡoŋkjo]; Emilian: Algûnc) is a frazione (borough) of the comune (municipality) of Ventasso in the province of Reggio Emilia, in the Italian region of Emilia-Romagna, located about 80 kilometres (50 mi) west of Bologna and about 50 kilometres (31 mi) southwest of Reggio Emilia. It was known as an independent comune until 2016.
