= Busana =

Busana Buṣâna (Emilian)
- Frazione
- Location of Busana in Italy
- Coordinates: 44°22′N 10°19′E
- Country: Italy
- Region: Emilia-Romagna
- Province: Reggio Emilia (RE)
- Comune: Ventasso

Area
  - Total: 30.4 km^{2} (11.7 sq mi)
- Elevation: 850 m (2,790 ft)

Population (31 May 2007)
  - Total: 1,278
  - Density: 42.0/km^{2} (109/sq mi)
- Demonym: Busanesi
- Time zone: UTC+1 (CET)
  - Summer (DST): UTC+2 (CEST)
- Postal code: 42032
- Dialing code: 0522

Busana (Emilian: Buṣâna) is a frazione (borough) of the comune (municipality) of Ventasso in the Province of Reggio Emilia, in the Italian region of Emilia-Romagna. It is located about 80 kilometres (50 mi) west of Bologna and about 45 kilometres (28 mi) southwest of Reggio Emilia. It was an independent municipality until 1 January 2024.

Its territory is included in the Appennino Tosco-Emiliano National Park.
