= Ventasso =

Ventasso Ventās (Emilian)
- Comune
- Comune di Ventasso
- Location within Italy Location within Emilia-Romagna
- Coordinates: 44°22′N 10°19′E
- Country: Italy
- Region: Emilia-Romagna
- Province: Reggio Emilia (RE)
- Frazioni: Acquabona, Busana, Ca' Ferrari, Caprile, Casale, Casalino, Cerreto Alpi, Cerreto Laghi, Cervarezza, Cinquecerri, Collagna, Frassinedolo, Ligonchio, Marmoreto, Montecagno, Nismozza, Oratorio, Ospitaletto, Piolo, Ponte Barone, Porali, Ramiseto, Talada, Vaglie, Valbona, Vallisnera

Government
  - Mayor: Antonio Manari

Area
  - Total: 258.18 km^{2} (99.68 sq mi)

Population (30 November 2017)
  - Total: 4,208
  - Density: 16.30/km^{2} (42.21/sq mi)
- Time zone: UTC+1 (CET)
  - Summer (DST): UTC+2 (CEST)
- Postal code: 42032
- Dialing code: 0522
- Website: Official website

Ventasso (Emilian: Ventās) is a comune (municipality) in the province of Reggio Emilia in the Italian region of Emilia-Romagna. It was established on 1 January 2016 by the merger of the municipalities of Busana, Collagna, Ligonchio and Ramiseto, and was named after the Apennine mountain located at the conjunction of the towns.
