= Ramiseto =

Ramiseto Ramṣèit (Emilian)
- Frazione
- Location of Ramiseto in Italy
- Coordinates: 44°25′N 10°16′E
- Country: Italy
- Region: Emilia-Romagna
- Province: Reggio Emilia (RE)
- Comune: Ventasso

Area
  - Total: 98.5 km^{2} (38.0 sq mi)

Population (Dec. 2004)
  - Total: 1,432
  - Density: 14.5/km^{2} (37.7/sq mi)
- Time zone: UTC+1 (CET)
  - Summer (DST): UTC+2 (CEST)
- Postal code: 42030
- Dialing code: 0522

Ramiseto (Emilian: Ramṣèit) is a frazione (borough) of the comune (municipality) of Ventasso in the Province of Reggio Emilia in the Italian region Emilia-Romagna, located about 90 kilometres (56 mi) west of Bologna and about 45 kilometres (28 mi) southwest of Reggio Emilia. It was a separate comune until 1 January 2016.
