= Consorzio Suonatori Indipendenti =

Italian band, 1992–2001

Consorzio Suonatori Indipendenti (C.S.I.; English: Consortium of Independent Players) is an Italian band that evolved from the former punk/art band CCCP Fedeli alla linea.

C.S.I. were founded in 1992 by Giovanni Lindo Ferretti and Massimo Zamboni, along with original members of the Italian band Litfiba. The naming conventions of the band followed political changes occurring around the time of the fall of the Berlin Wall. Whereas the earlier band's name referenced the Cyrillic lettering for SSSR (i.e. USSR) as it was wrongly pronounced by peasants in their Italian native region of Emilia Romagna, "CSI" follows the conventions of the Italian acronym for the newly established Commonwealth of Independent States.

After Zamboni departed in 2000, the remaining members of C.S.I. continued in the form of Per Grazia Ricevuta. C.S.I. split in 2001.

== Discography ==
- Maciste contro tutti (Maciste against All); 1993, with the bands Üstmamò and Disciplinatha; live
- Ko de mondo; 1994
- In quiete (In quiet), 1994; ‘unplugged’ concert for Videomusic
- Linea Gotica (Gothic Line); 1996, I dischi del mulo (distributed by PolyGram Italia)
- Tabula Rasa Elettrificata (Electrified Blank Slate); 1997
- La terra, la guerra, una questione privata (The land, the war, a private affair); 1998
- Noi non ci saremo vol. 1 (We will not be there 1); 2001, collection
- Noi non ci saremo vol. 2 (We will not be there 2); 2001, collection

== Members ==
- Giovanni Ferretti (vocals - 1992–2001)
- Massimo Zamboni (guitar - 1992–2000)
- Gianni Maroccolo (bass, guitar - 1992–2001)
- Roberto Zamagni (drums - 1992)
- Pino Gulli (drums - 1993–1994)
- Francesco Magnelli (keyboards, vocals - 1992–2001)
- Giorgio Canali (guitar, vocals, violin - 1992–2001)
- Ginevra Di Marco (vocals - 1992–2001)
- Alessandro Gerbi (percussions - 1993–1994)
- Gigi Cavalli Cocchi (drums - 1996–2001)
