= Giovanni Lindo Ferretti =

Italian singer-songwriter, composer, and author (born 1953)

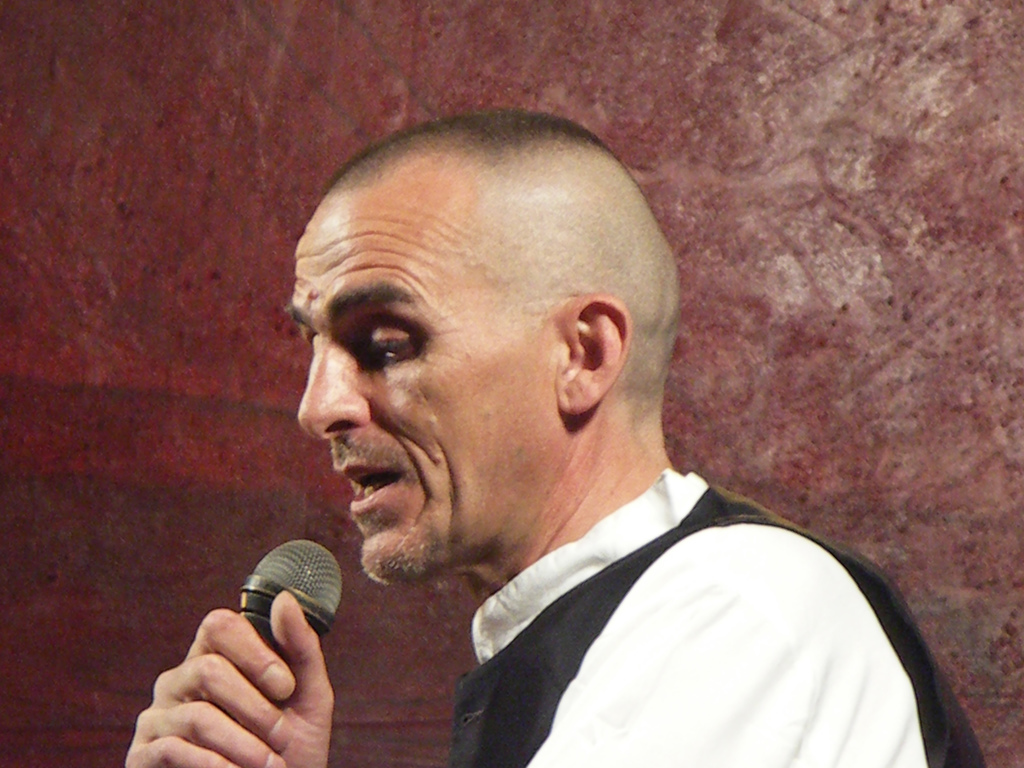
Italian songwriter Giovanni Lindo Ferretti

Giovanni Lindo Ferretti (born 9 September 1953) is an Italian singer-songwriter, composer, and author. He is considered to be one of the founders of Italian punk rock music.

== Biography ==
Lindo Ferretti was born in Cerreto Alpi (frazione of Collagna), in the province of Reggio Emilia, in the western part of the Italian region of Emilia-Romagna. After completing his studies and working as a psychiatric nurse for five years, Ferretti traveled around Europe.

=== CCCP ===
In East Berlin, he met Massimo Zamboni, with whom, in 1982, he founded the band CCCP - Fedeli alla linea ("CCCP - Loyal to the line"). CCCP soon became a benchmark of the so-called "alternative music" in Italy. The band dissolved in 1990.

=== CSI ===
In 1992, again with Massimo Zamboni and with an original core member of the Italian band Litfiba, Gianni Maroccolo, he founded a new band called Consorzio Suonatori Indipendenti ("Consortium of Independent Players"), also known as CSI. This band continued until 2000, when Zamboni departed. The bands’ names followed the naming of the political entities of the Soviet Union and its dissolution in the late 20th century. "CCCP" is the Cyrillic lettering for SSSR (i.e. USSR), and "CSI" mimics the Italian acronym for the Commonwealth of Independent States.

=== PGR ===
From 2002, he led the band Per Grazia Ricevuta, abbreviated as PGR ("For a Received Grace"). This is a stock phrase usually attached to mementos acknowledging miraculous divine gifts. The new band name, in fact, marked his own rediscovery of his Catholic roots.

PGR's lineup changed with the release of the album D’anime e d’animali (2004), and in the fashion of previous incarnations the name was altered. In this case, however, the band's acronym was only slightly changed into PG^{3}R (Però Gianni Giorgio Giovanni Resistono, meaning "Yet Gianni Giorgio and Giovanni Resist"). PGR toured again in 2006, with the tour entitled 'Ripasso / Ribassi – Saldi, fino ad esaurimento scorte’ (Revision / Discounts – Sales while Stock Lasts). With the release of the album Ultime notizie di cronaca in 2009, the band announced its dissolution.

=== Solo work and collaborations with other artists ===
In 2000, Ferretti published the book In Mongolia in retromarcia ("In Mongolia, in reverse"), co-authored with Massimo Zamboni, about their journey there. This trip also influenced CSI's third album, Tabula Rasa Elettrificata. Also in 2000 he released a solo album, Co.Dex.

In 2003, together with director Giorgio Barberio Corsetti, Lindo Ferretti wrote the texts and lyrics for the theatrical work Iniziali: BCGLF. The music was composed by fellow PGR member Gianni Maroccolo. A CD of the same name was released in 2004. Also in 2004 he released the album Litania ("Litany"), co-authored with Ambrogio Sparagna, which contains both folk prayers and pieces from the repertoire of CCCP and CSI.

He toured Italy again in 2005 with the theatrical shows Falce e Martello. Falciati e martellati. Requiem per una civiltà ("Hammer and Sickle. Hammered and Sickled. Requiem for a Civilisation"), with Ambrogio Sparagna, and Pascolare parole, allevare pensieri ("Pasturing words, Breeding thoughts"), with LEF (born Lorenzo Esposito Fornasari), Raffaele Pinelli and Ezio Bonicelli.

=== Politics and recent activities ===
Radical left political thought marked much of Ferretti's musical and artistic output, and he had been involved with the extra-parliamentary radical group Lotta Continua. He subsequently revised his political thinking, however, and in the 2006 elections he voted for the right-center coalition.

In 2006, he published his first autobiographical book, Reduce ("Returned/Survivor"), in which he describes his new poetics and views on life through childhood memories, poems and invectives against the contemporary world. He accompanied the release of the book with a new show of the same name, featuring the same artists he had previously worked with on Pascolare parole, allevare pensieri.

Concerning his conversion to Roman Catholicism, he has said, "I was raised by my grandmother and parents as a Catholic. But I was also a child of the 1960s and I voluntarily adhered to communism, that pestilence of the soul that stole the best children from our families. In a certain sense I have returned home. But I cannot bear the idea of being an anti-communist with the same stupidity and spite as when I was an atheist and blasphemer. I want a bit more dignity than that."

His association with the Catholic organisation Communion and Liberation, led to his participation in their 2007 festival in Rimini, where he spoke at a meeting about the Priestly Fraternity of the Missionaries of St.Charles Borromeo.

Since Sunday 4 September 2011, he has been the author of a column on Avvenire, an Italian Catholic newspaper published by the Italian Episcopal Conference.

Lindo Ferretti currently lives in his native village, where he is a horse breeder.

== Discography ==
=== Solo and collaborations ===
- Co.Dex; 2000
- Iniziali: BCGLF (Initials: BCGLF); Universal Music Italia, 2004, with Giorgio Barberio Corsetti
- Litania (Litany); 2004, with Ambrogio Sparagna

== Books ==
- Fedeli alla linea. Dai CCCP ai CSI [Loyal to the Line. From CCCP to CSI], Giunti, 1997, ISBN 88-09-03919-X.
- Il libretto rozzo dei CCCP e CSI [A Rough Booklet on CCCP and CSI], Giunti, 1998, ISBN 88-09-21372-6.
- In Mongolia in retromarcia [In Mongolia, in Reverse]; Giunti, 2000, ISBN 88-09-01639-4, with Massimo Zamboni. Out of print.
- Reduce [Returned/Survivor], Mondadori, 2006, ISBN 88-04-56058-4.
- Bella gente d'Appennino [Fine People of the Apennines], Mondadori, 2009, ISBN 978-88-04-58264-9.
- Óra: difendi, conserva, prega. Reggio Emilia: Aliberti. 2022. ISBN 978-88-93235-20-4.

== Filmography ==
- Anime fiammeggianti (Flaming Souls), 1994
- Tutti giù per terra (All Down to the Ground), 1997
- Intimisto; 2001
- Paz!; 2002
- Perduto amor (Lost Love); 2003
- Il vento, di sera (The wind, in the evening); 2004
- Craj – Domani; 2004
