= Per Grazia Ricevuta =

Per Grazia Ricevuta, often abbreviated as P.G.R., is an Italian band led by Giovanni Lindo Ferretti.

The band originated from Ferretti's previous project Consorzio Suonatori Indipendenti, which disbanded following the departure of long-time collaborator Massimo Zamboni. Their name 'Per Grazia Ricevuta ("For a Received Grace"), also marks a change. It is a stock phrase usually attached to mementos acknowledging miraculous divine gifts, and reflects Lindo Ferretti's rediscovery of his Catholic roots following a long career of radical left activism.

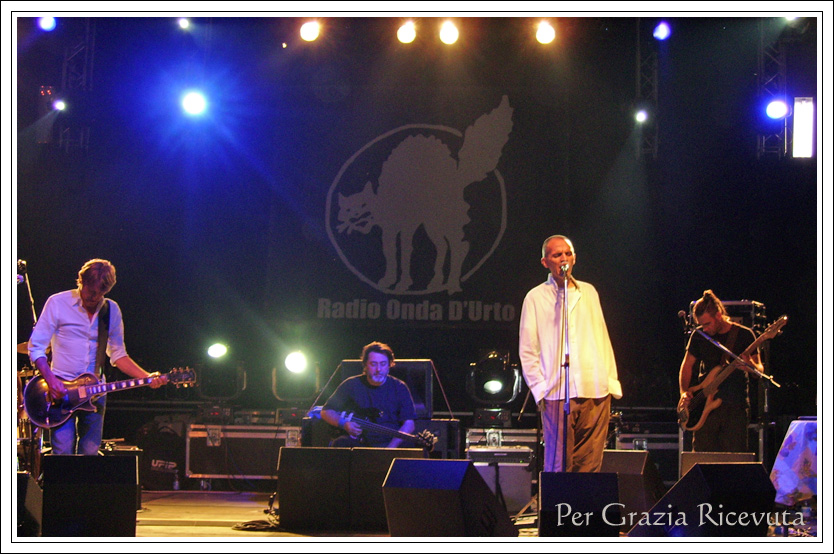
Per Grazia Ricevuta concert in 2006

PGR's lineup changed with the release of the album D’anime e d’animali (2004), when founding members Ginevra Di Marco and Francesco Magnelli departed. As a response, the band's acronym was slightly changed into PG^{3}R (Però Gianni Giorgio Giovanni Resistono, meaning "Yet Gianni Giorgio and Giovanni Resist"). In 2006 PGR performed a tour around Italy entitled 'Ripasso / Ribassi - Saldi, fino ad esaurimento scorte’ (Revision / Discounts - Sales while Stock Lasts). With the release of 2009's Ultime notizie di cronaca, the band announced its dissolution.

== Discography ==
- Per grazia ricevuta (For a Received Grace); 2002
- Montesole 29 giugno 2001 (At Montesole, 29 June 2001); 2003, live
- D'anime e d'animali (On Souls and on Animals); 2004
- Ultime notizie di cronaca; 2009
- ConFusione; featuring Franco Battiato; 2010

== Members ==
- Giovanni Lindo Ferretti - vocals (2001-2009)
- Giorgio Canali - guitars, vocals (2001-2009)
- Gianni Maroccolo - bass (2001-2009)
- Francesco Magnelli - keyboards (2001-2004)
- Ginevra Di Marco - vocals (2001-2004)
