= Moradi =

Moradi (Persian: مرادی) may refer to:

== Places ==
- Moradi, Bushehr, a village in Bushehr Province,
- Moradi, Hormozgan, a village in Hormozgan Province, Iran
- Moradi, Kohgiluyeh and Boyer-Ahmad, a village in Kohgiluyeh and Boyer-Ahmad Province, Iran

It is also a common Kurdish surname.

== Other uses ==
- Moradi (surname)

== See also ==
- Moradei
- Morandi
- Mouradian (disambiguation)
