= Moradi (surname) =

Moradi (Persian: مرادی) is a surname. Notable people with the surname include:

- Ali Akbar Moradi (born 1957), Iranian musician
- Amir Moradi (born 1990), Iranian middle-distance runner
- Ebrahim Moradi (c.1899–1977), Iranian filmmaker
- Elshan Moradi (born 1985), Iranian chess grandmaster
- Houshang Moradi Kermani (born 1944), Iranian writer
- Jafad Moradi (born 1984), Iranian football player
- Masoud Moradi (born 1965), Iranian football referee
- Mike Moradi, American biochemist, entrepreneur and diabetes advocate
- Mohammad Jafar Moradi (born 1990), Iranian long distance runner
- Sajjad Moradi (born 1983), Iranian middle distance runner
- Shahmirza Moradi (1924–1997), Iranian sorna player
- Sohrab Moradi (born 1988), Iranian weightlifter
- Zak Moradi (born 1990), Kurdish-Irish hurler
- Zaniar Moradi (1987–2018), executed Kurd political prisoner

== See also ==
- Moradi (disambiguation)
- Moradei
- Morandi
- Mouradian (disambiguation)
