= Alvania zibinica =

Scientific classification
- Kingdom: Animalia
- Phylum: Mollusca
- Class: Gastropoda
- Subclass: Caenogastropoda
- Order: Littorinimorpha
- Superfamily: Rissooidea
- Family: Rissoidae
- Genus: Alvania
- Species: †A. zibinica

Binomial name
- †Alvania zibinica Pantanelli, 1888

Species of gastropod

Alvania zibinica is an extinct species of minute sea snail, a marine gastropod mollusk or micromollusk in the family Rissoidae.

== Description ==
The length of the shell attains 2.4 mm, its diameter 1 mm.

== Distribution ==
Fossils have been found in Miocene strata near Sassuolo, Italy.
