= San Giuseppe, Sassuolo =

Church building in Sassuolo, Italy

Coordinates: 44°32′29.994″N 10°47′3.991″E

San Giuseppe is a former-Roman Catholic church and former convent in Sassuolo, Region of Emilia Romagna, Italy.

== History ==
The church was erected by the order of the Servi di Maria in the 1520s. Enlarged between 1560 and 1565, while the adjacent convent was built. It was further refurbished and enlarged in 1645, decorating the interiors in Baroque style. The Servi were suppressed in 1769 by the Duchy, and in 1783, the convent was transferred to the Franciscan order, who already owned the nearby church of the Madonna di Sotto. In 1796, it was transferred to the commune, and became a school. It still remains a school

The interiors still conserve the wooden organ doors designed in 1655 by Luigi Bartolomeo Avanzini, and completed with the sculptures of Carlo Guastuzzi. The choir apse has a large canvas depicting St Joseph in Glory with St Costanzo Bishop and St Phillip Benizzi (1645) by Antonio Giarola. The wooden choir is from the 17th century. Other 17th century canvases are in the church.
