= Sassolino =

Italian anise-flavored liqueur

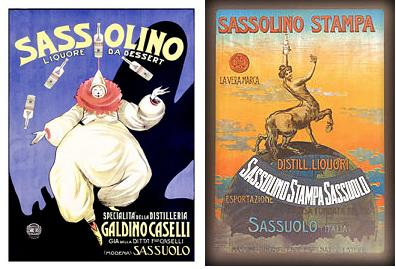
Sassolino, the typical digestive from Modena and Sassuolo

Sassolino, sometimes called Sassolino di Modena, is an anise-flavored liqueur from Sassuolo, Italy. Its flavor is derived from star anise.

== History ==
This liqueur first appeared in 1804, when a Swiss named Bazzingher from the Canton of Graubünden, along with several fellow countrymen—most of whom were grocers or spice sellers—moved to Sassuolo, Modena, and began producing an aniseed-flavored liqueur. The company then changed hands several times before the Stampa family acquired it and put the liqueur into mass production.

The liqueur is 40% vol.
