= Moradi, Hormozgan =

Moradi مرادي
- Village
- Location within Iran
- Coordinates: 26°38′04″N 55°21′17″E
- Country: Iran
- Province: Hormozgan
- County: Qeshm
- Bakhsh: Shahab
- Rural District: Dulab

Population (2006)
  - Total: 283
- Time zone: UTC+3:30 (IRST)
  - Summer (DST): UTC+4:30 (IRDT)

Moradi (Persian: مرادي, also Romanized as Morādī) is a village in Dulab Rural District, Shahab District, Qeshm County, Hormozgan Province, Iran. At the 2006 census, its population was 283, in 68 families.
