= Leo Morandi =

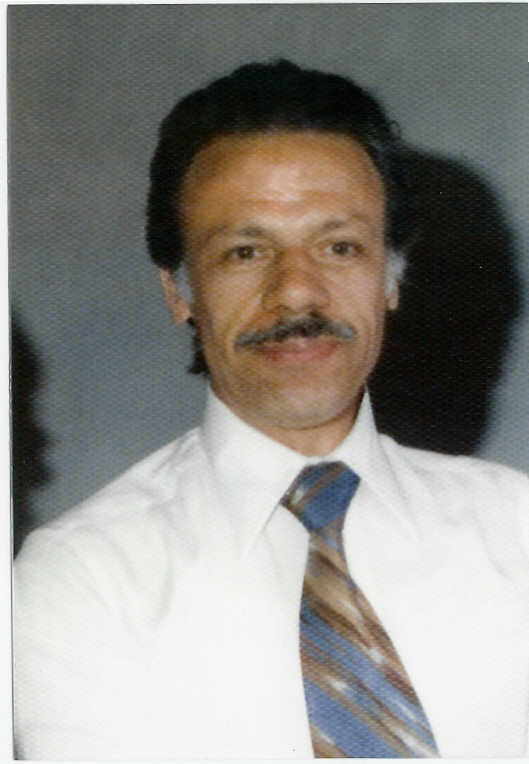
- Leo Morandi in 1974
- Born: 14 November 1923; Sassuolo, Italy
- Died: 2 May 2009 (aged 85); Formigine, Italy
- Occupations: Inventor, entrepreneur, marketer
- Known for: Commercial ceramics

Leo Morandi (14 September 1923 – 2 May 2009) was an Italian entrepreneur and inventor who was a promoter of the new post-World War II commercial ceramics industry of Sassuolo, Italy.

He started his career by collaborated with local ceramic producers (Marazzi Group) and with Industries D'Agostino in Salerno, Italy. In 1954, after selling an innovative patent to Ceramiche Marazzi (biscuit selection unit), he was able to initiate startup of his own equipment supply business. He invented a number of machines and processes for ceramic tile manufacturing.

Leo Morandi's innovations, knowledge, and experience aided growth and advancement throughout the Sassuolo ceramic companies, which in the 1960s constituted the world renowned Sassuolo tile district.

== Impact on industry ==
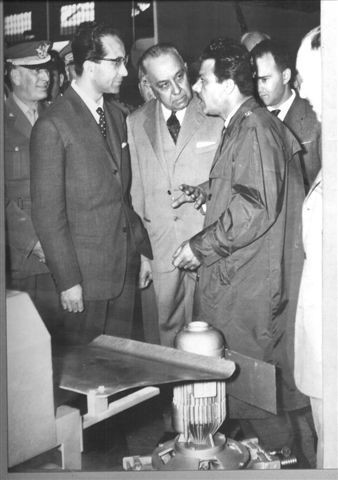
Leo Morandi (on right) speaking with Minister Colombo (left) and Mr.Orlandi (center, Modena's businessman)

Morandi's first invention used two electrodes to select the ceramic (biscuit) tiles; the passage of electricity through the material showed that it was not suitable for the successive glazing.

The production chain for ceramic tiles was then mainly handcrafted and labour-intensive, but Leo Morandi's inventions started the successful automation of various units. After the initial years he was able to open a distinct efficient production unit. Morandi was a reserved man and did not like publicity. He involved his workers and customers in the improvement of his inventions and innovations.

Ceramic industry equipment examples include: automated floor tile edge glaze remover, automated packaging (floor tiles where historically bound with thin iron wire, before shipment), specialized silk screen machines, the peristaltic pump, the transport line, the hydraulic press, tile overturning mechanism, press reception unit, and glazing applications done with disk booths. These basic tile processing elements are still in use.

Leo Morandi began exporting these proven automated Italian ceramic industry innovations to Spain, allowing advancement of two primary ceramic industry clusters.

== Patents of Morandi Leo ==
- 1945 - 1 December Licence n.424701 - Device to abrade automatically the enamel from the edges of the floor tiles for covering.
- 1958 - 14 June Licence n.592220 - System to fasten with iron threads tiles of geometrical shape.
- 1958 – 1 August Licence n.598125 – Machine to automatically remove from the tiles the enamel strains left on the edges during the humid glazing
- 1958 – 1 August Licence n.593124 – Device to brush tiles on both sides with a single passage.
- 1958 – 2 August Licence n.593126 – Automatic machine to remove from the tiles the slobbers left by the stamps on the edges.
- 1958 – 2 August Licence n.593127 – Pump for dense liquids, particularly for vitreous enamel in watery suspension for the ceramic industry.
- 1958 – 25 September Licence n.595789 – Machine to retrieve the vitreous enamel of the tiles which result defective after the humid glazing.
- 1959 – 6 April Licence n.606642 – Procedure to manufacture enameled tiles with dull edges.
- 1960 – 7 April Licence n.629034 – Automatic machine to collect into a pile humid tiles coming from the press.
- 1961 – 7 April Licence n.646867 – Conveyor for ceramic floor tiles.
- 1961 – 7 April Licence n.646866 – Device to turn over the tiles on the conveyor.
- 1961 – 15 April Licence n.647228 – Machine to divide the tiles by thickness.
- 1962 – 28 March Licence n.685219 – Hydraulic system, consisting in a press actioned by mostly self-feeding cylinders.
- 1968 – 13 March Licence n.832329 – Automatic machine to apply screen printed decorations to tiles.
- 1973 – 6 Decembers Licence n.1001087 – Device to distribute the tiles being part of a row.
- 1973 – 6 Decembers Licence 1001086 – Device to empty the baking supports of tiles.
- 1978 – 12 April Licence n.1104063 – Perfected device with rotary discs to nebulize and evenly distribute enamels to be applied on tiles.
- 1978 – 3 July Licence n.28979B – Glazing cabin with rotary discs to nebulize and evenly distribute enamels to be applied on tiles.

== Image gallery ==
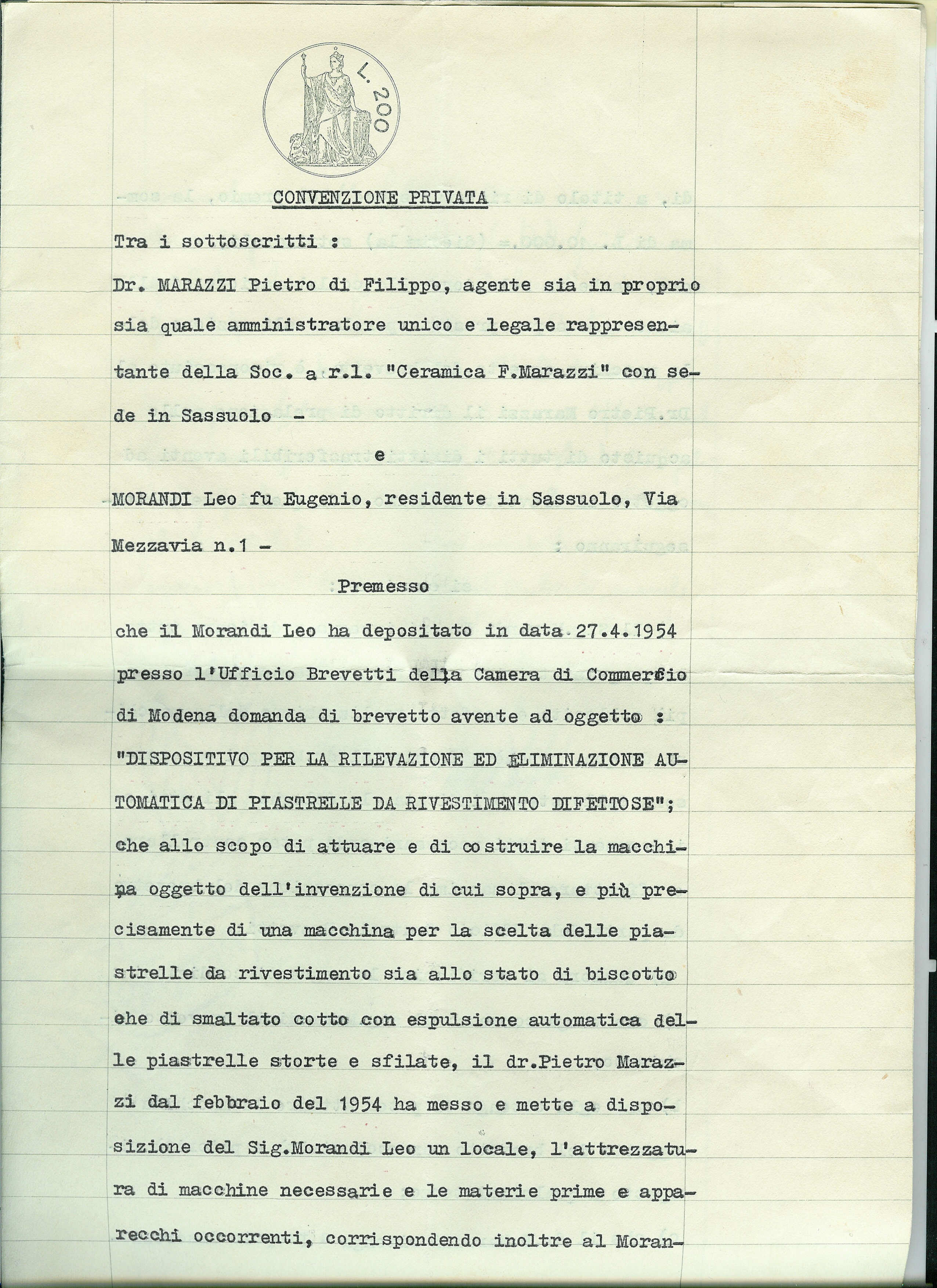
Letter of intent Morandi-Marazzi pag.1

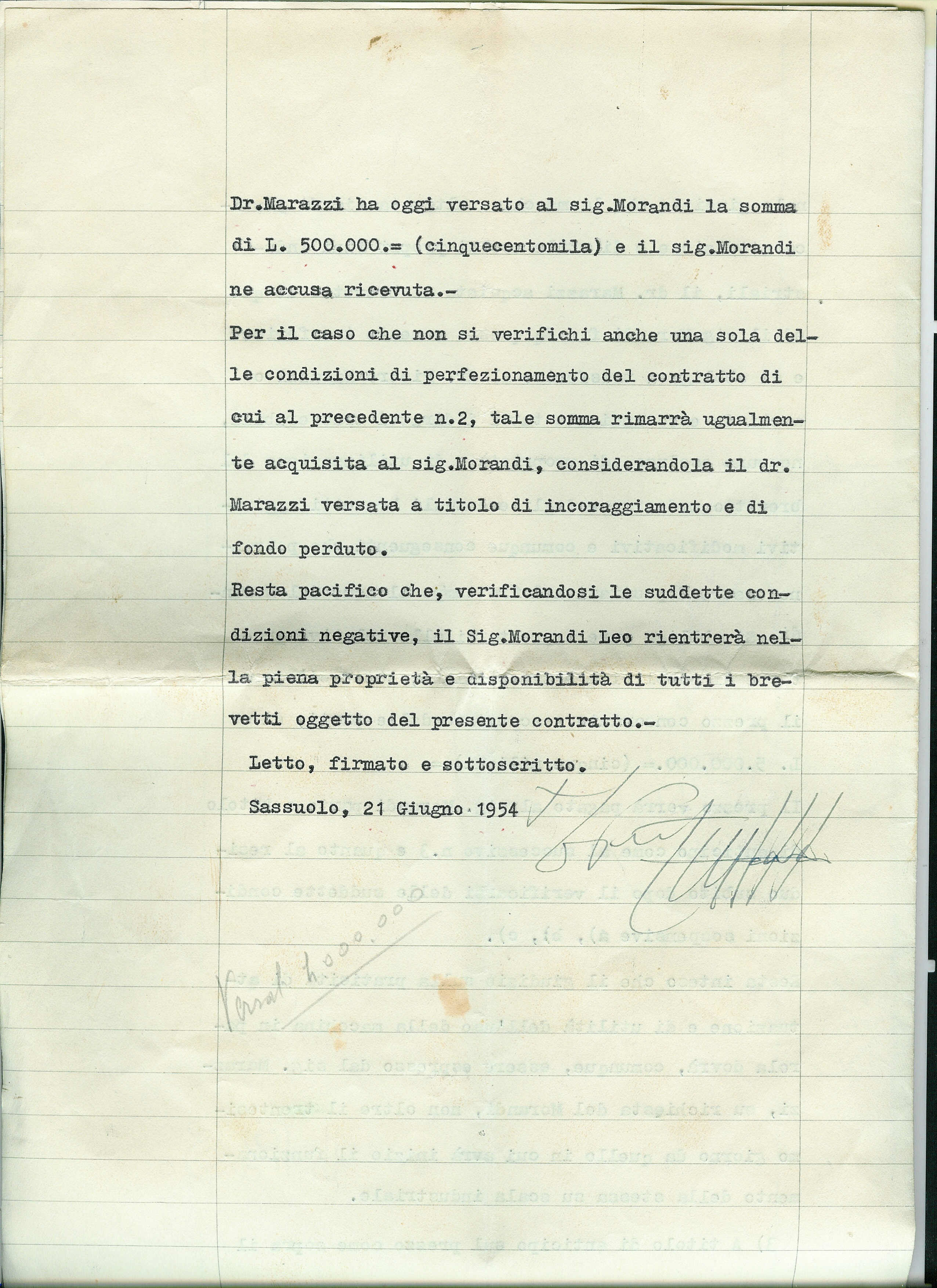
Letter of intent Morandi-Marazzi pag.4

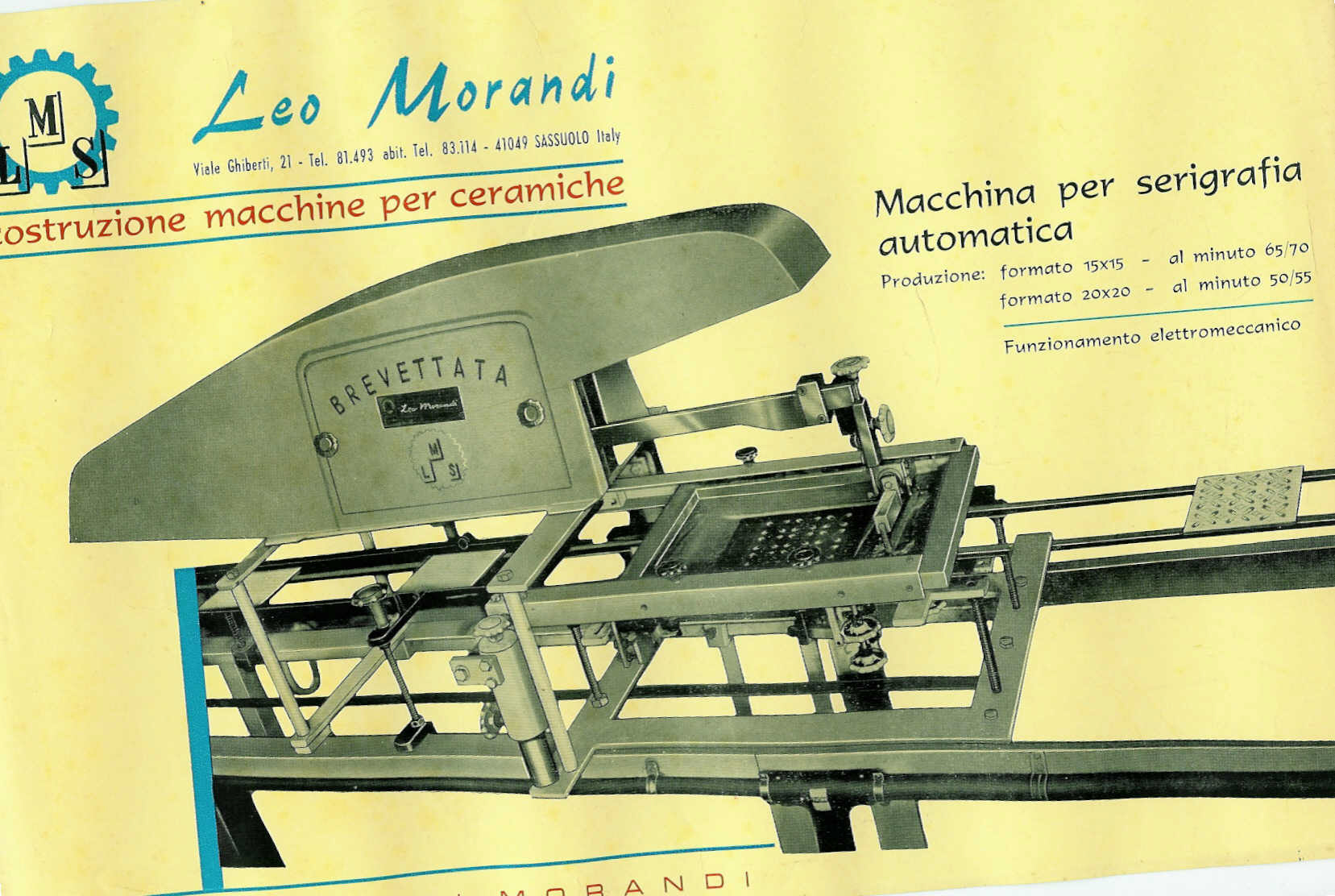
Catalogue Morandi's silk screen machine S1

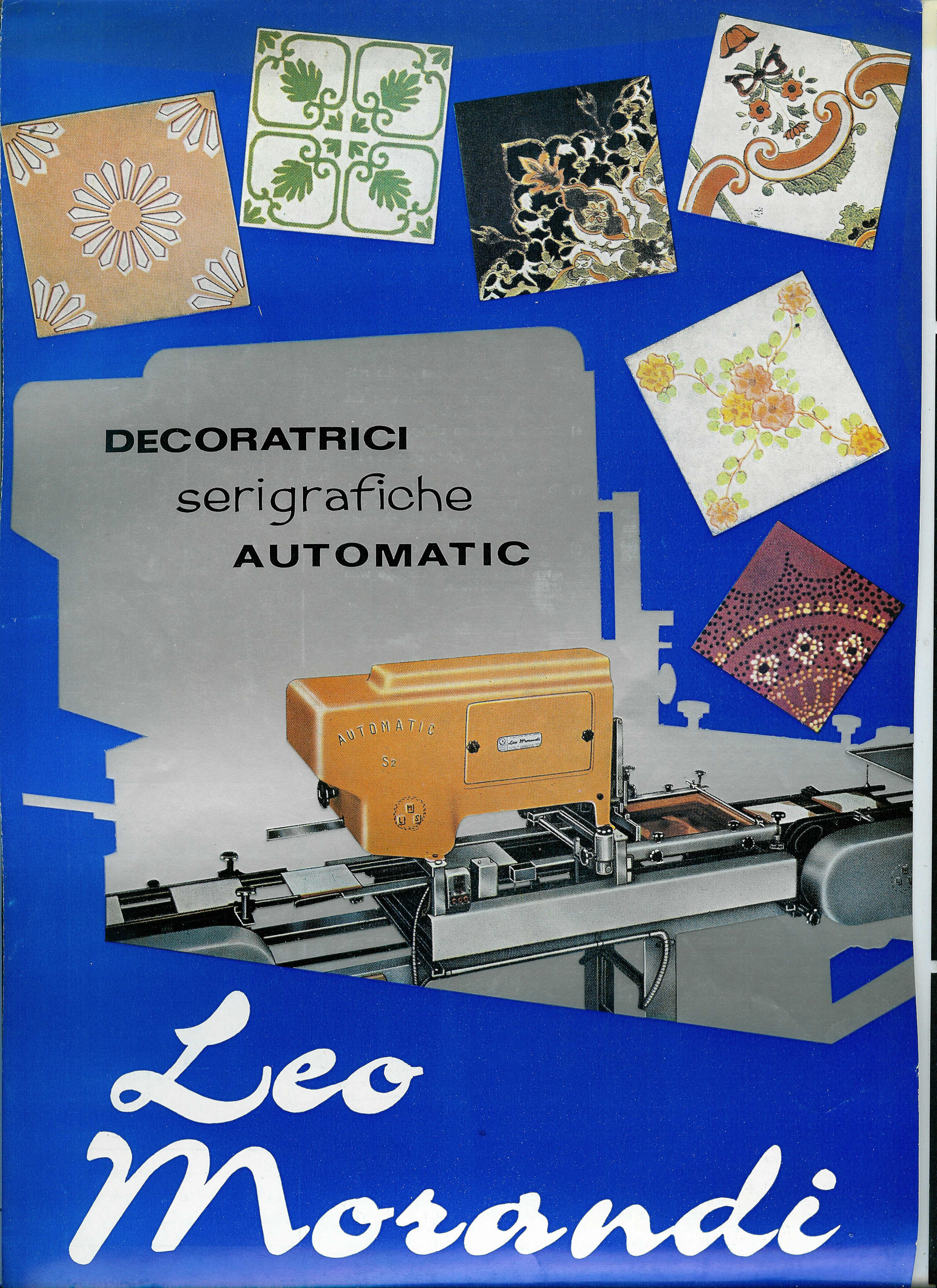
Catalogue Morandi's silk screen machine S2-S3

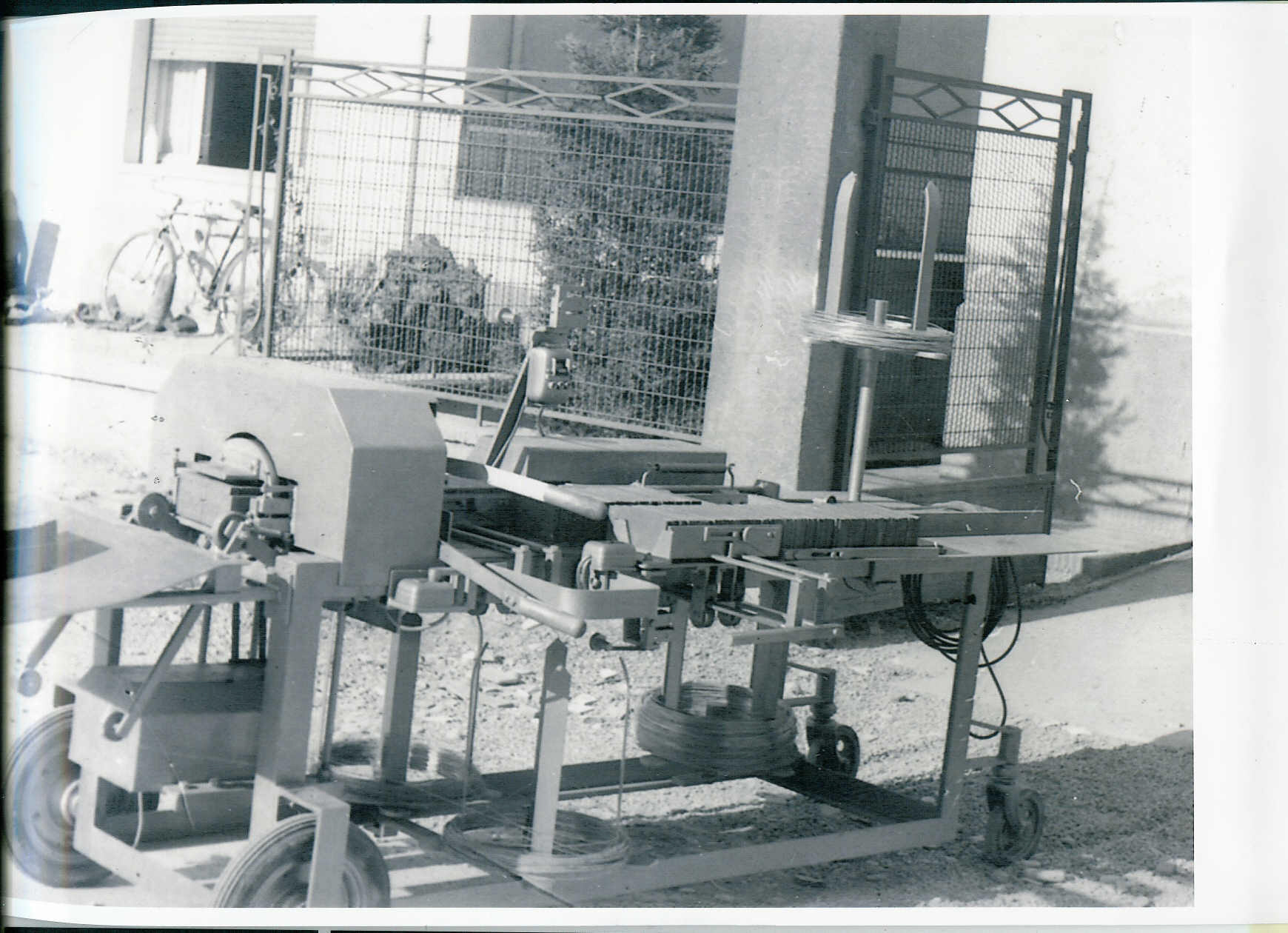
Morandi's fastening device

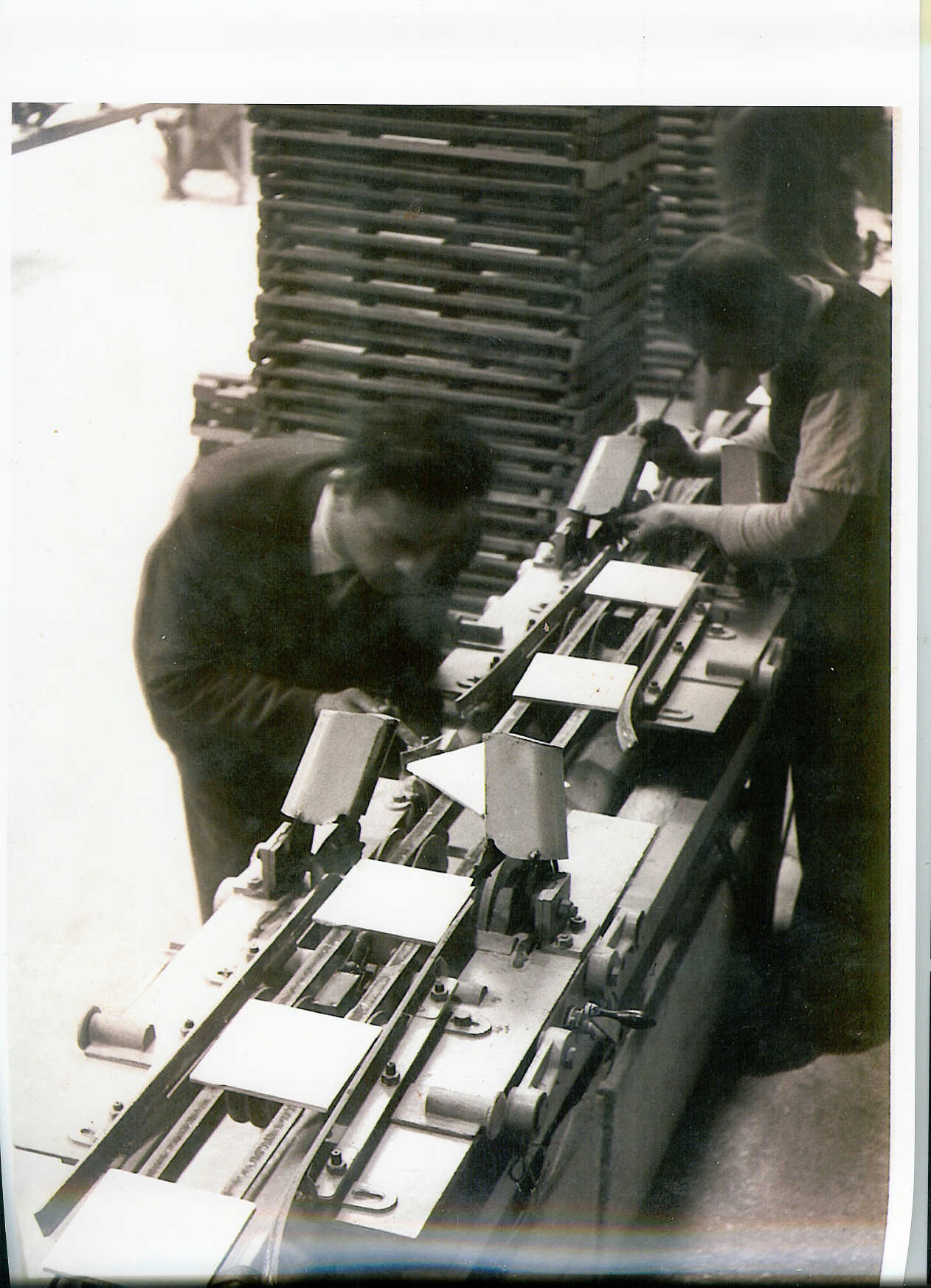
Leo Morandi near the device to abrade the edges of the tiles(1945)

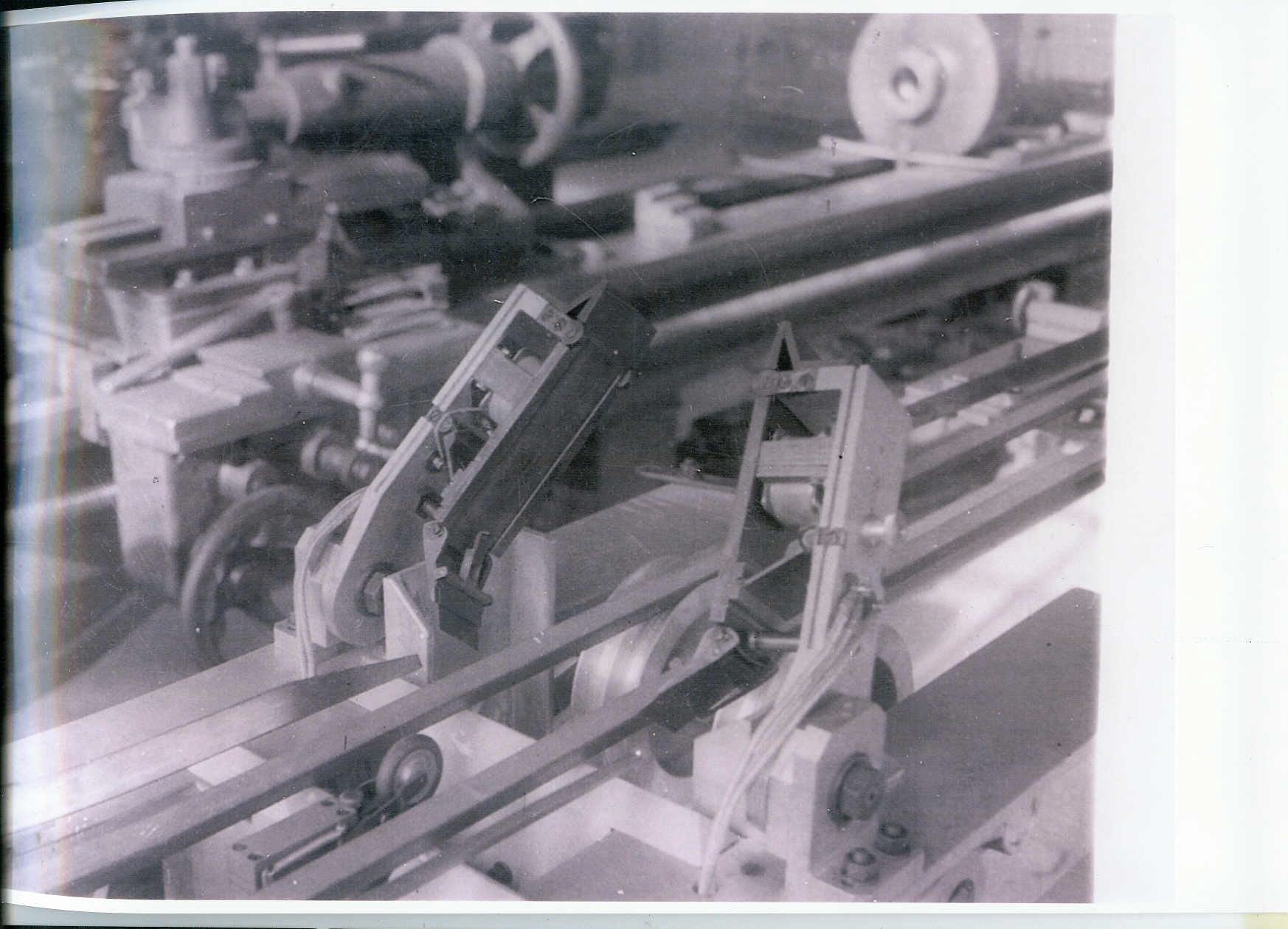
Morandi's device to abrade the edges of the tiles in his factory(1945)

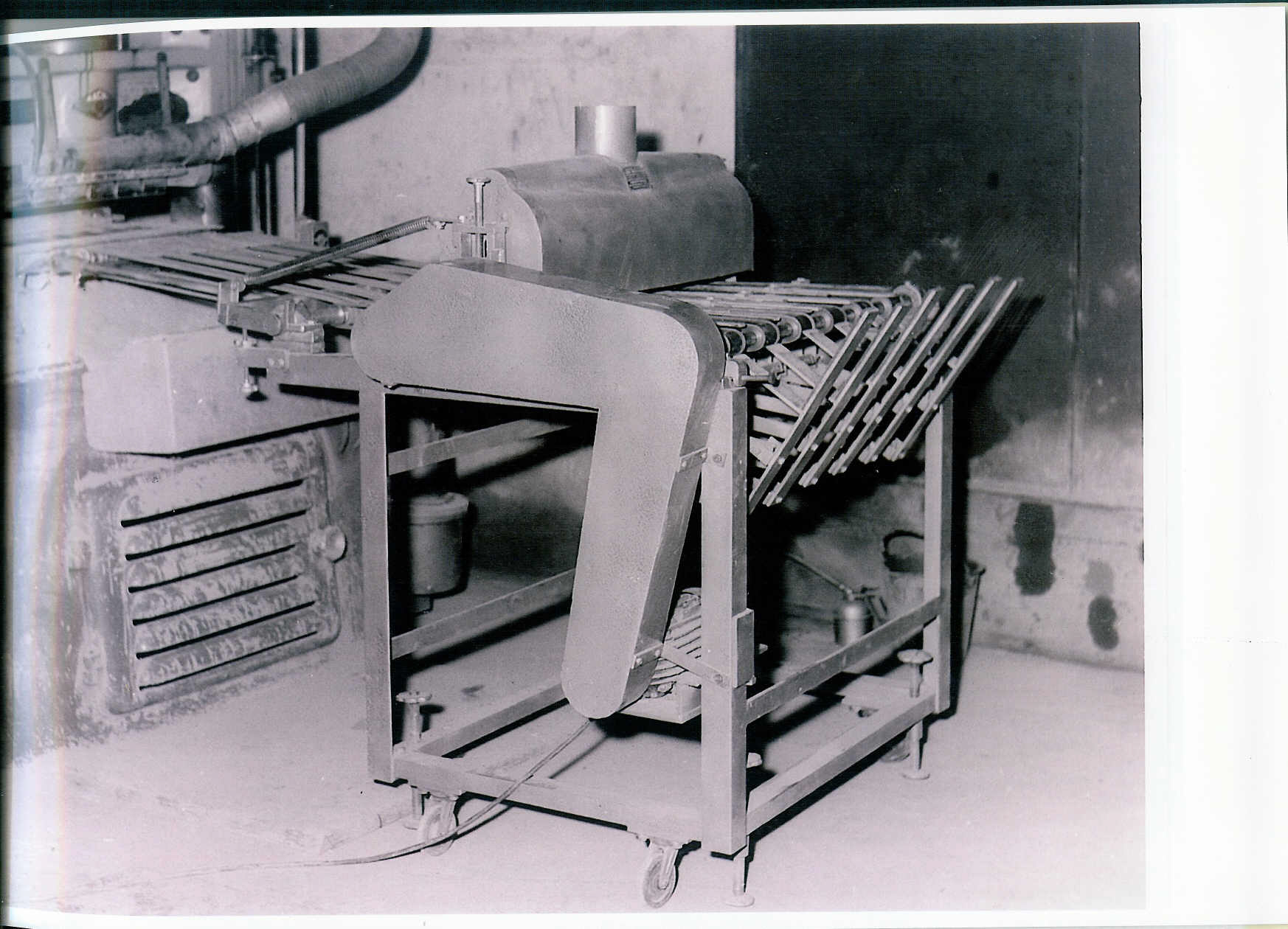
Morandi's Automatic machine for collecting into a pile ceramic tiles from the pressed one

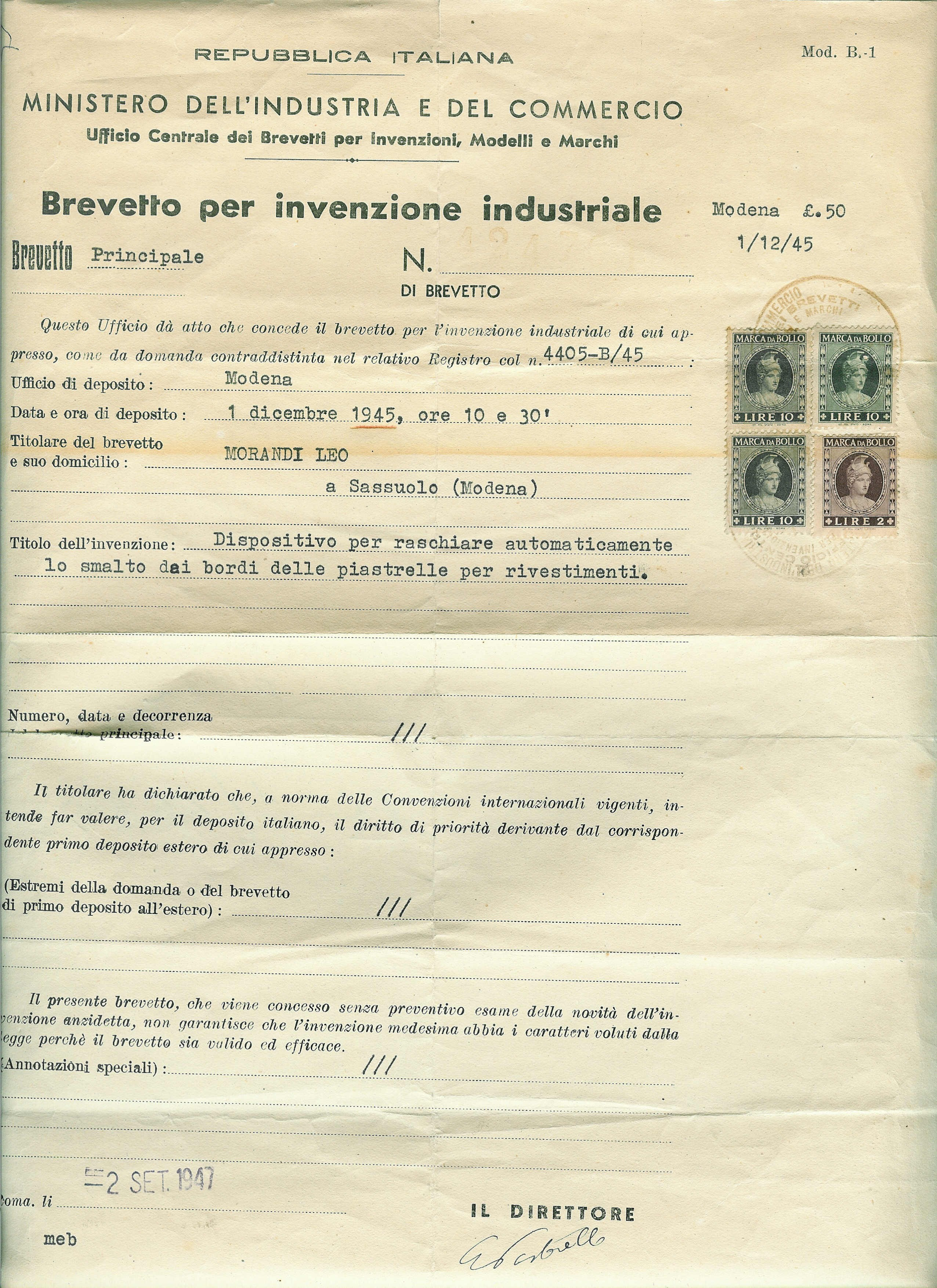
Licence n.424701

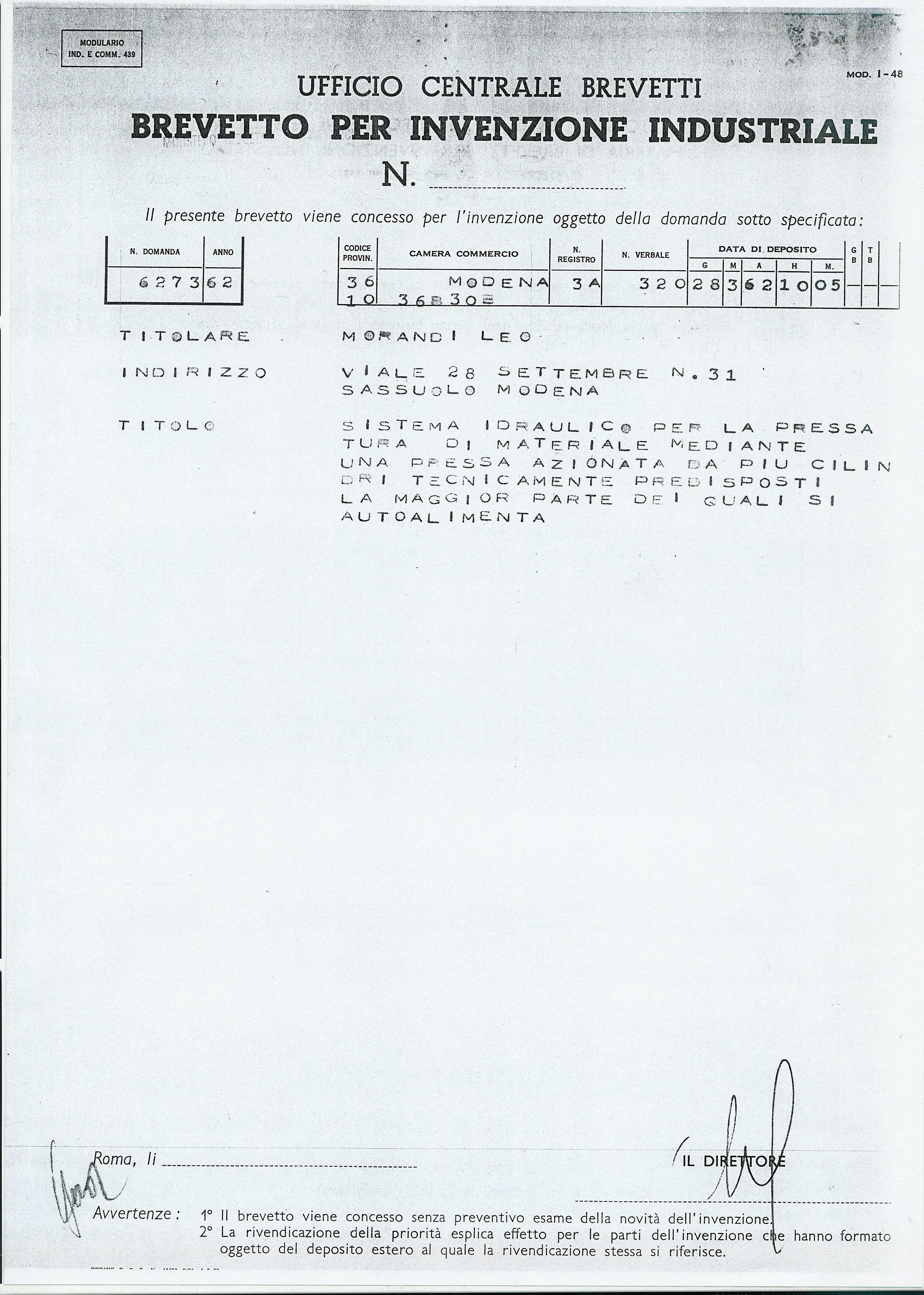
Licence n.685219

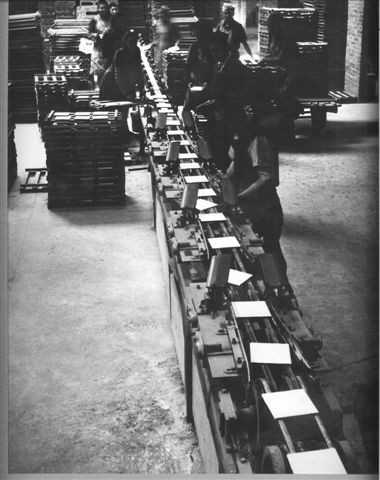
Licence n.424701

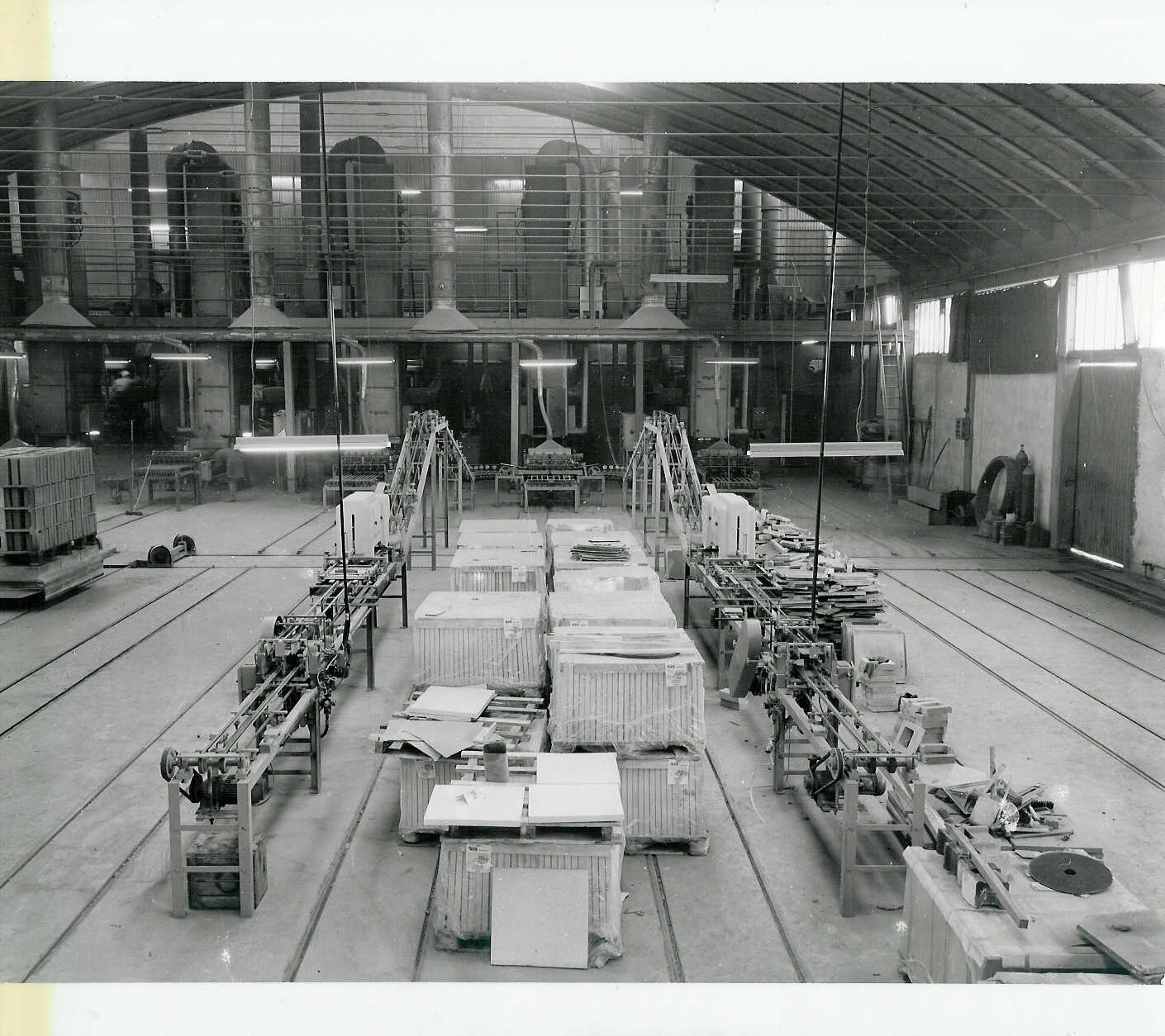
Morandi's lines "60"

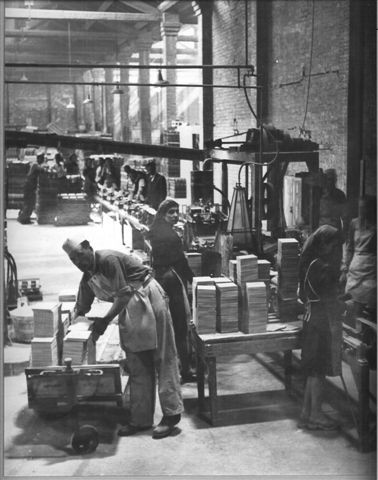
1945 Morandi's glazing line

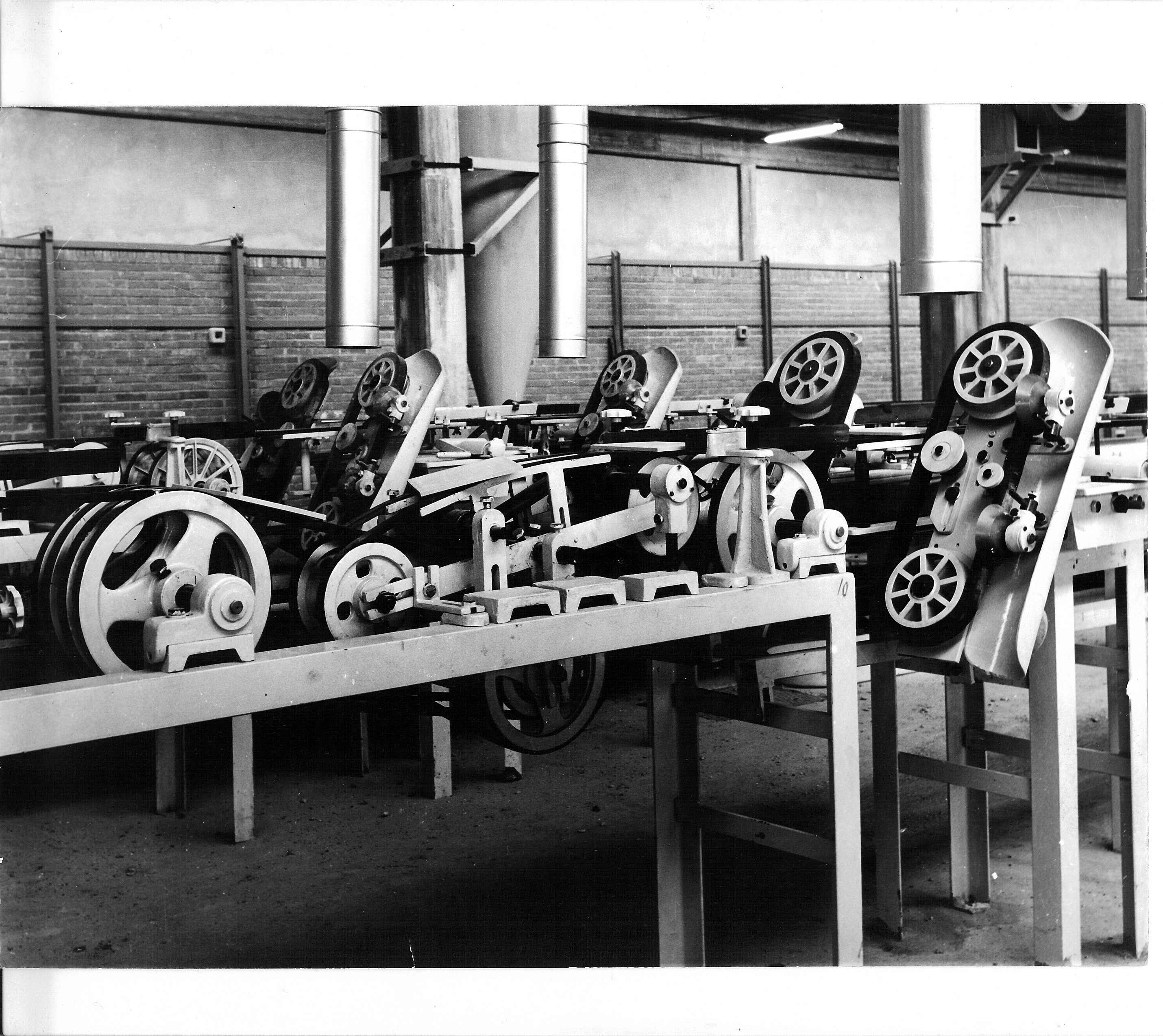
Licence n.598125

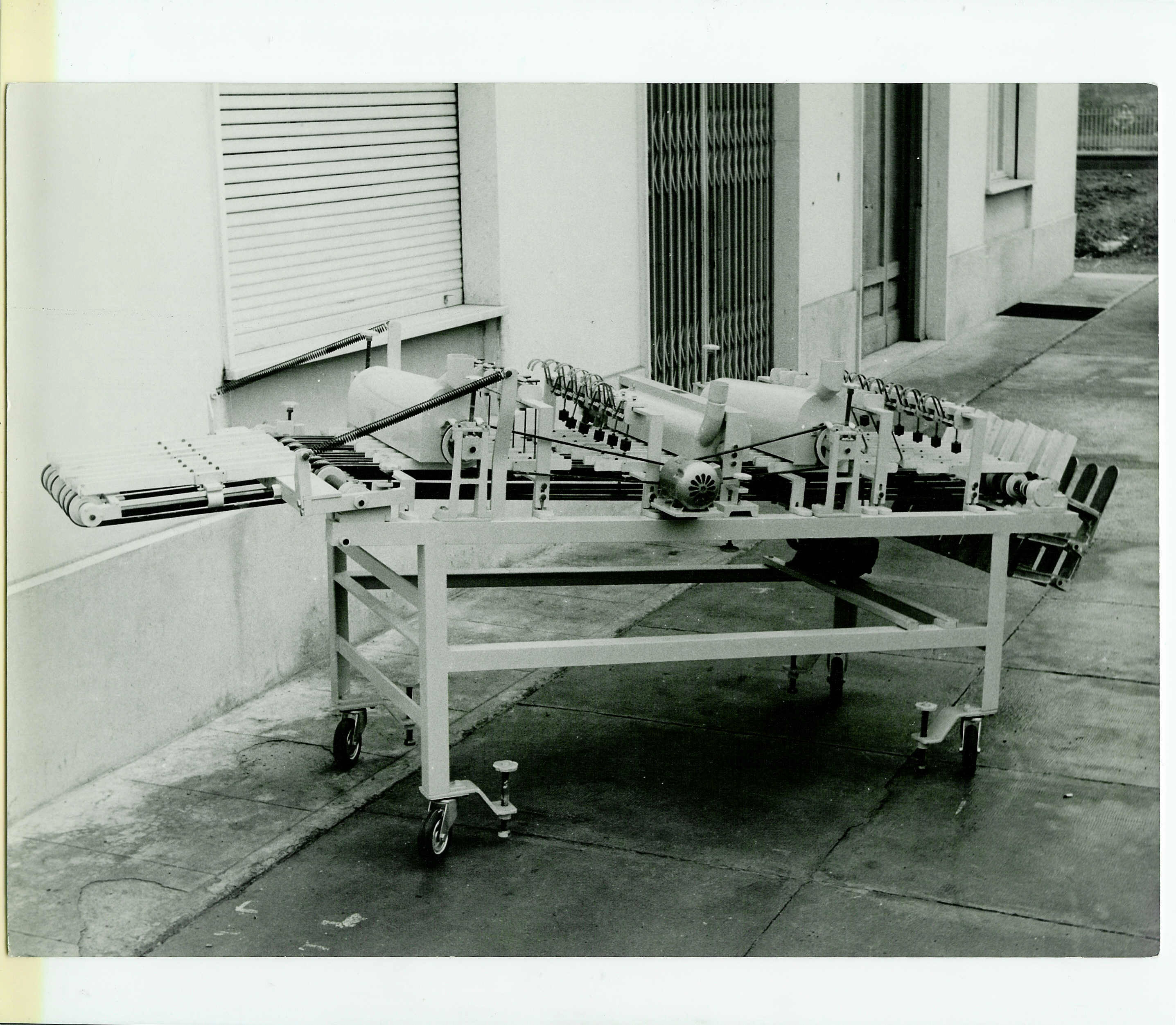
Morandi's out press device

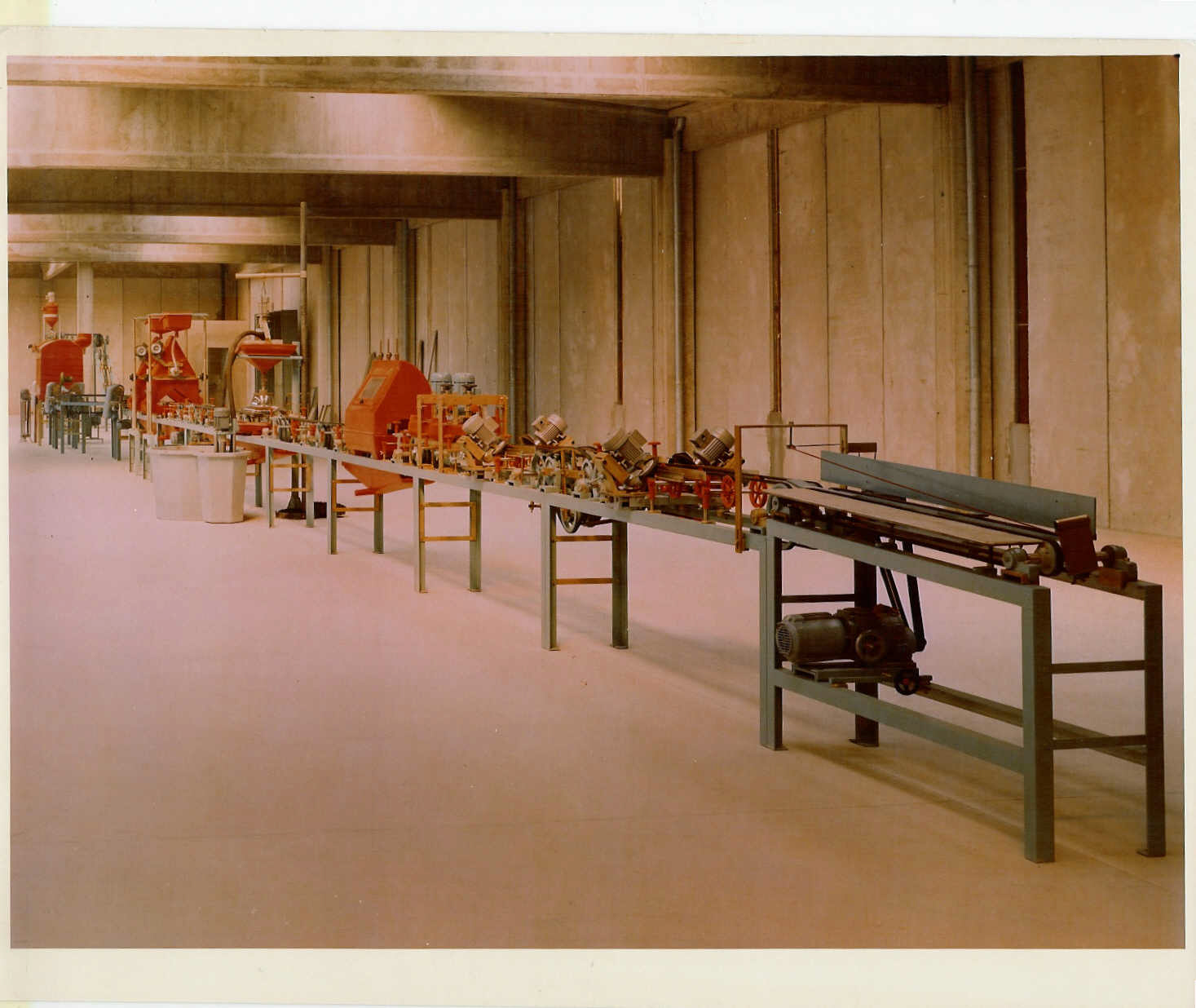
Morandi's 1970 glazing line

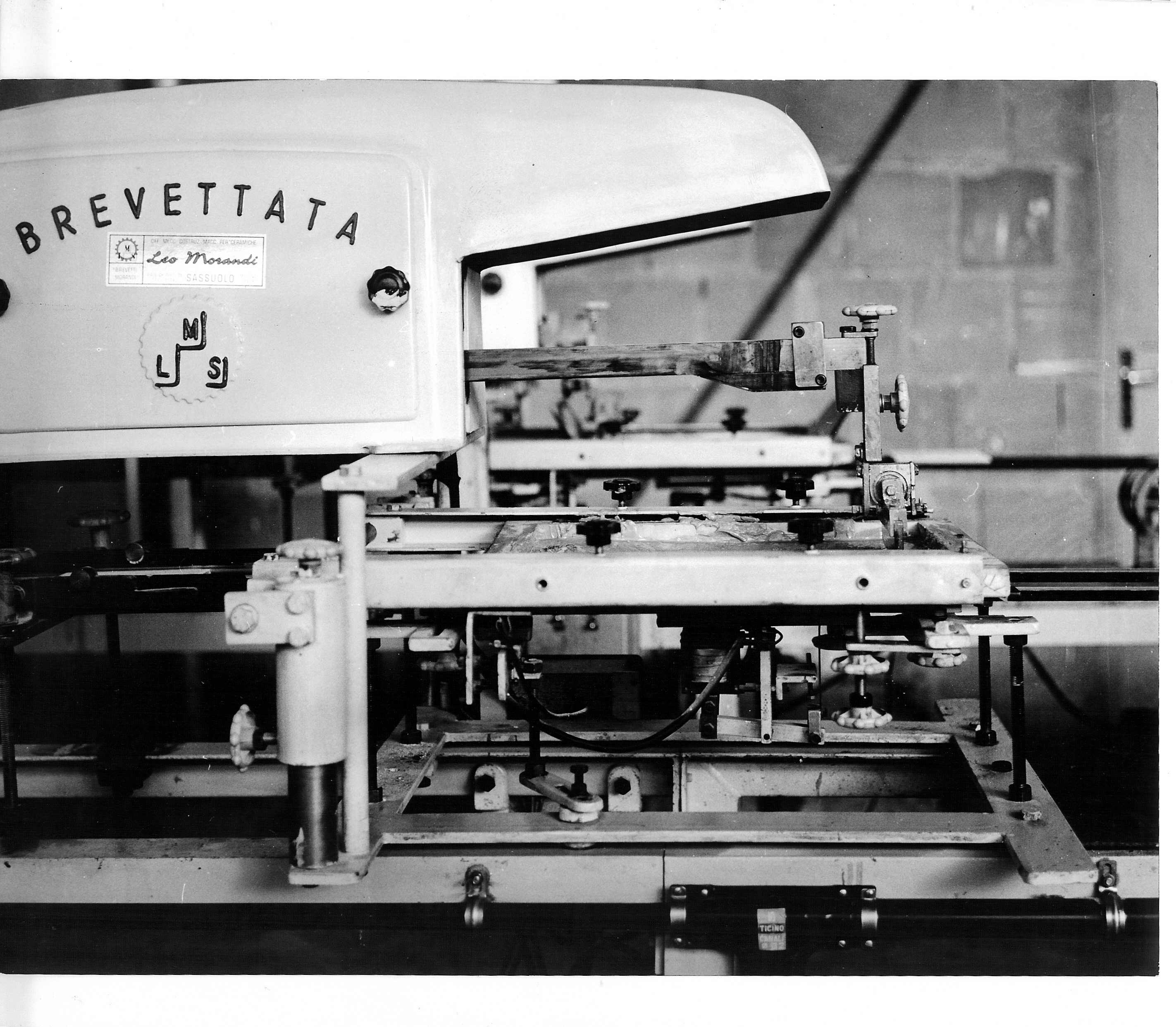
Morandi's first silk screen machine

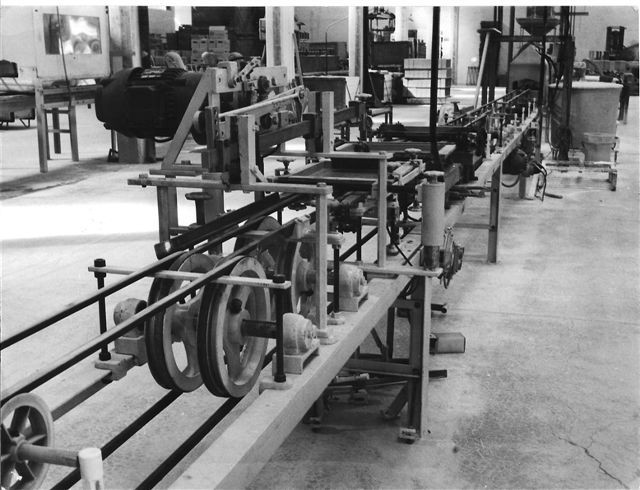
Morandi's first silk screen machine

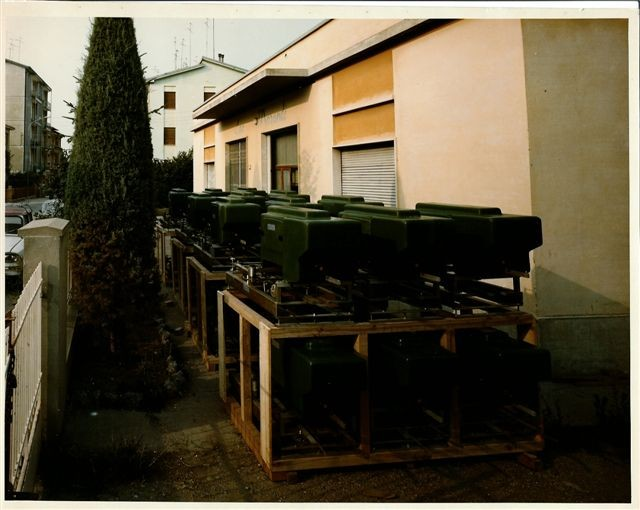
Morandi's silk screen machines ready for Spain

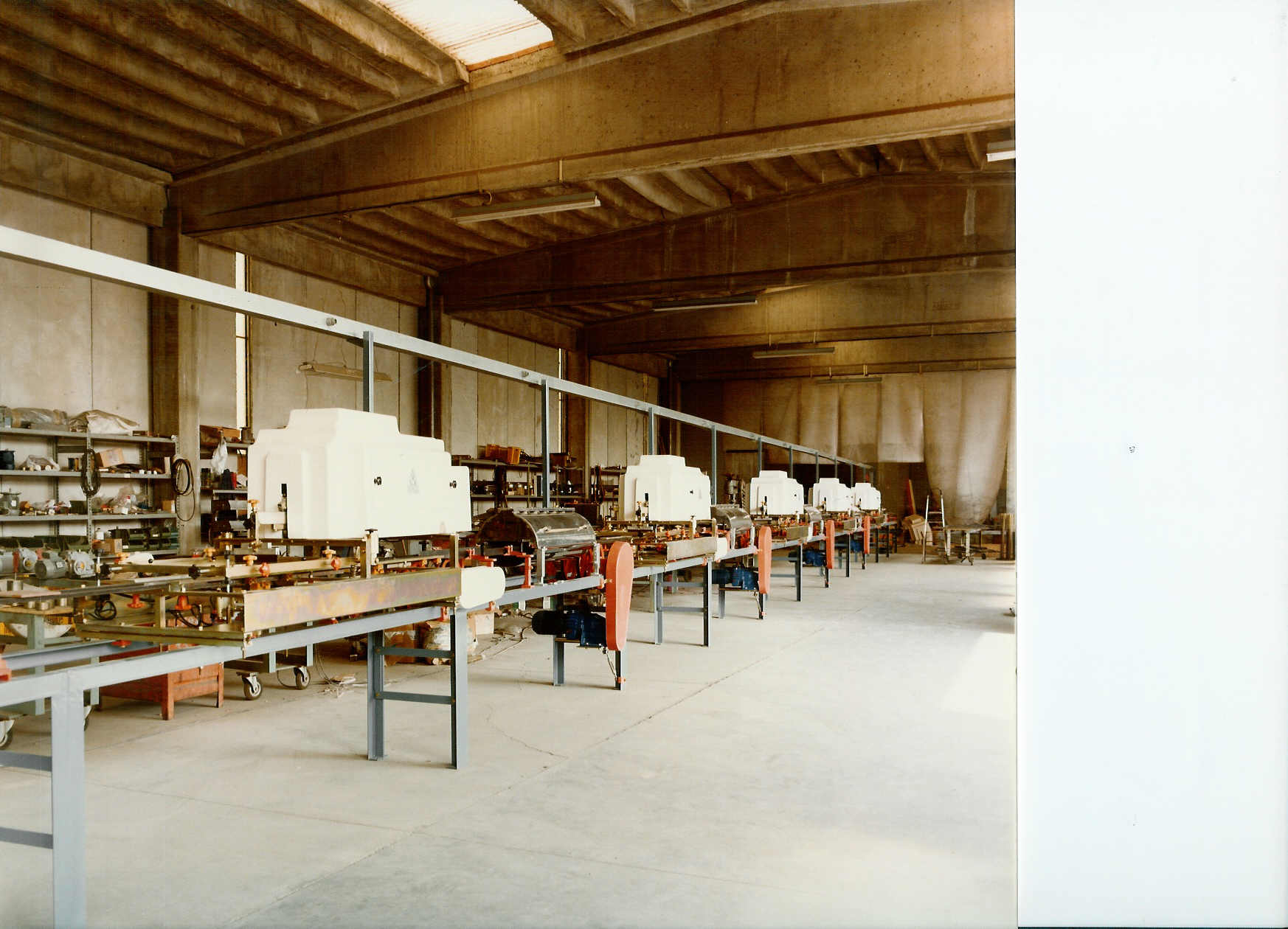
Morandi's third serie silk screen device

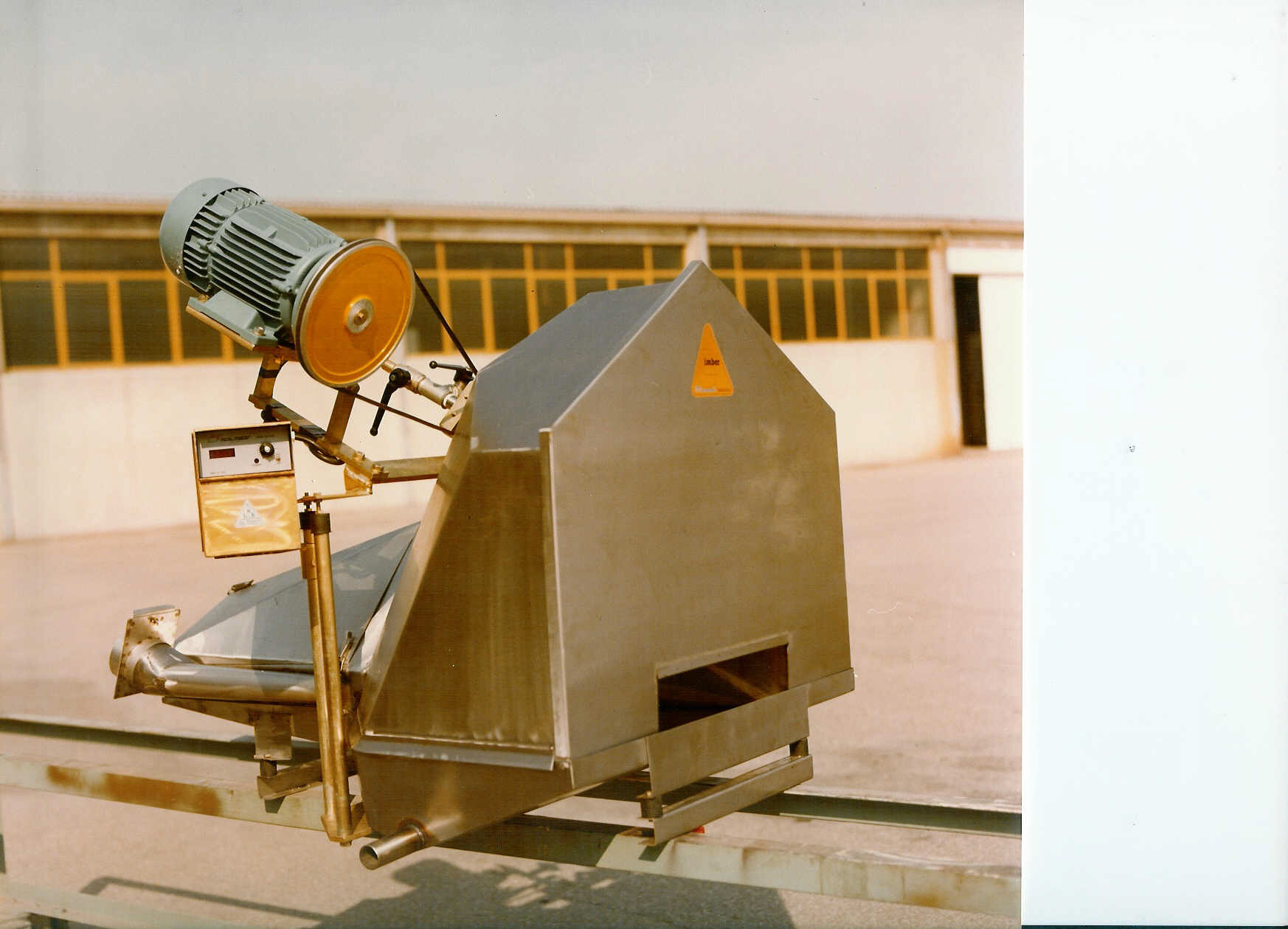
Morandi's disc cabin glazing unit

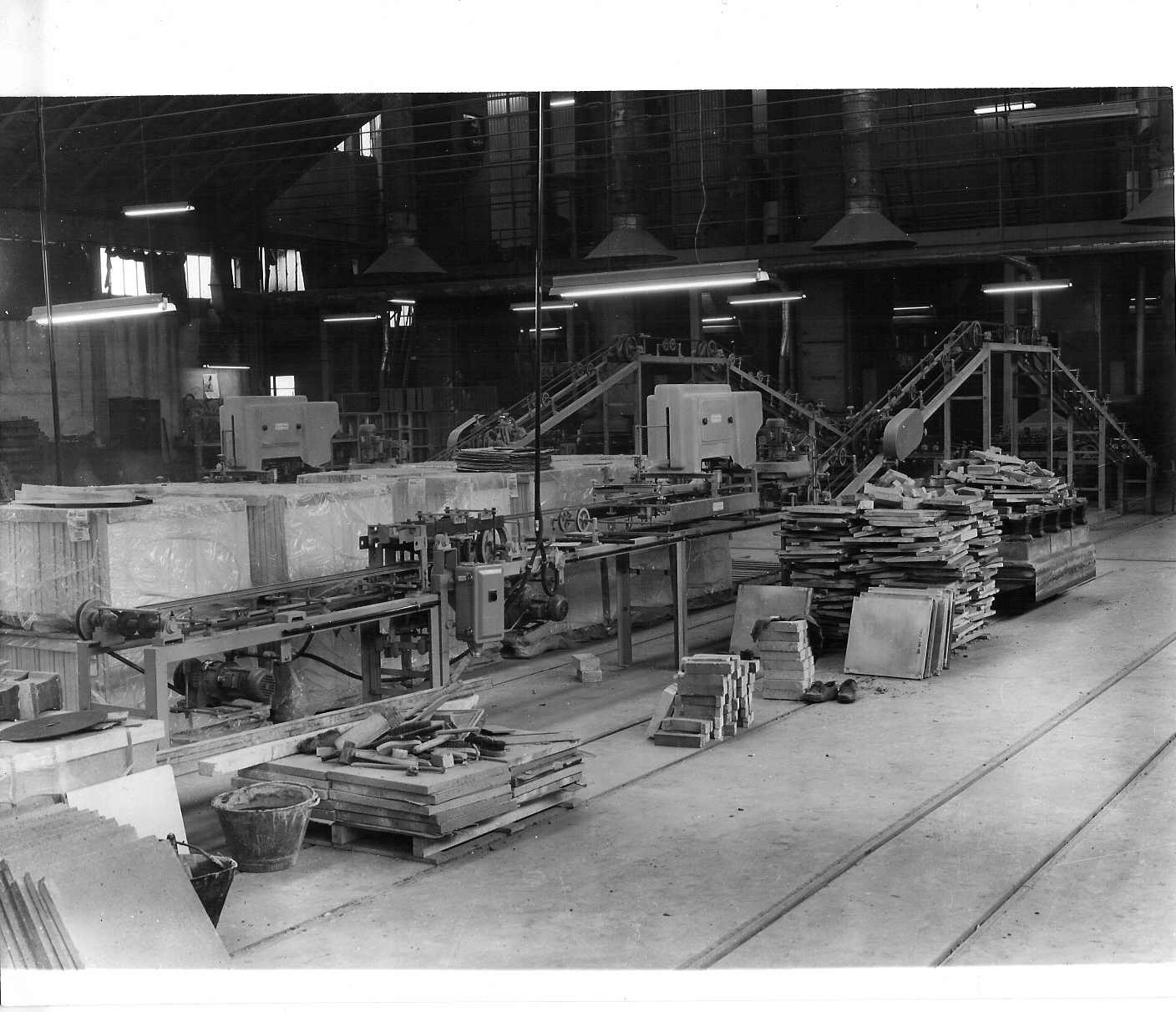
Morandi's glazing lines "60"

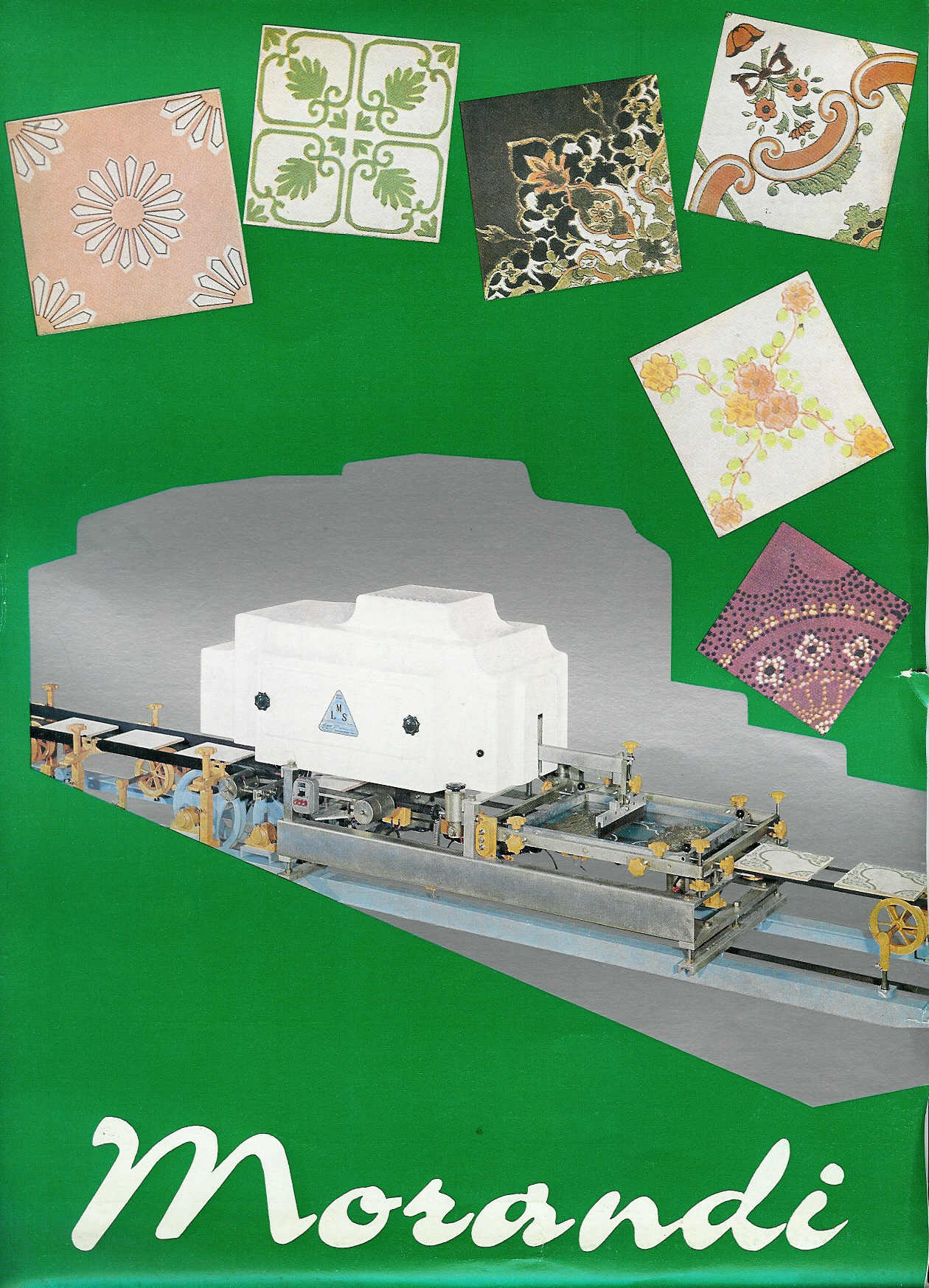
Catalogue Morandi's silk screen machine S4-S5
