= Mike Moradi =

Mike Moradi is an American biochemist, entrepreneur and diabetes advocate. Mike is a co-founder / CEO of Sensulin, a company that strives to provide a once-a-day solution for type I/II diabetics. He has founded or helped establish more than a dozen nanotechnology and biotechnology companies. He was selected as a 2017 Young Global Leader by the World Economic Forum. He is frequently invited as speaker at technology and business conferences and workshops worldwide, on topics such as innovation, entrepreneurship and the future of diabetes.

== Career ==
Moradi has participated in or is a member of several organizations, including:

- World Economic Forum's (WEF) Young Global Leaders (YGL) Class of 2017
- The Future Trends Forum, a Madrid-based think tank sponsored by BankInter
- TED - (Technology, Entertainment and Design).
- The Committee of Visitors for the National Science Foundation's Division of Industrial Innovation and Partnerships (IIP) within the Directorate for Engineering (ENG) in 2010.
