= Morandi =

Morandi is an Italian surname, which is derived from the given name Morando. The surname may refer to:

- Aldo Morandi (1896–1975), Italian political activist
- Anna Morandi Manzolini (1714–1774), Italian anatomist
- Giacomo Morandi (born 1965), Italian prelate, official of the Roman Curia
- Gianni Morandi (born 1944), Italian singer
- Giorgio Morandi (1890–1964), Italian painter
- Giovanni Maria Morandi (1622–1717), Italian painter
- Giovanni Morandi (composer) (1777–1856), Italian composer
- Leo Morandi (1923–2009), Italian businessman
- Matteo Morandi (born 1981), Italian gymnast
- Michele Morandi (born 1976), Italian Roman Catholic bishop
- Pier Giorgio Morandi (born 1958), Italian oboist and conductor
- Riccardo Morandi (1902–1989), Italian civil engineer
- Rodolfo Morandi (1902–1955), Italian politician
- Santiago Morandi (born 1984), Uruguayan football player

== Other uses ==
- Morandi (band), a Romanian music group
- Ponte Morandi, the collapsed Morandi Bridge in Genoa, Italy
