= Sassuolo =

Sassuolo Sasól (Emilian)
- Comune
- Città di Sassuolo
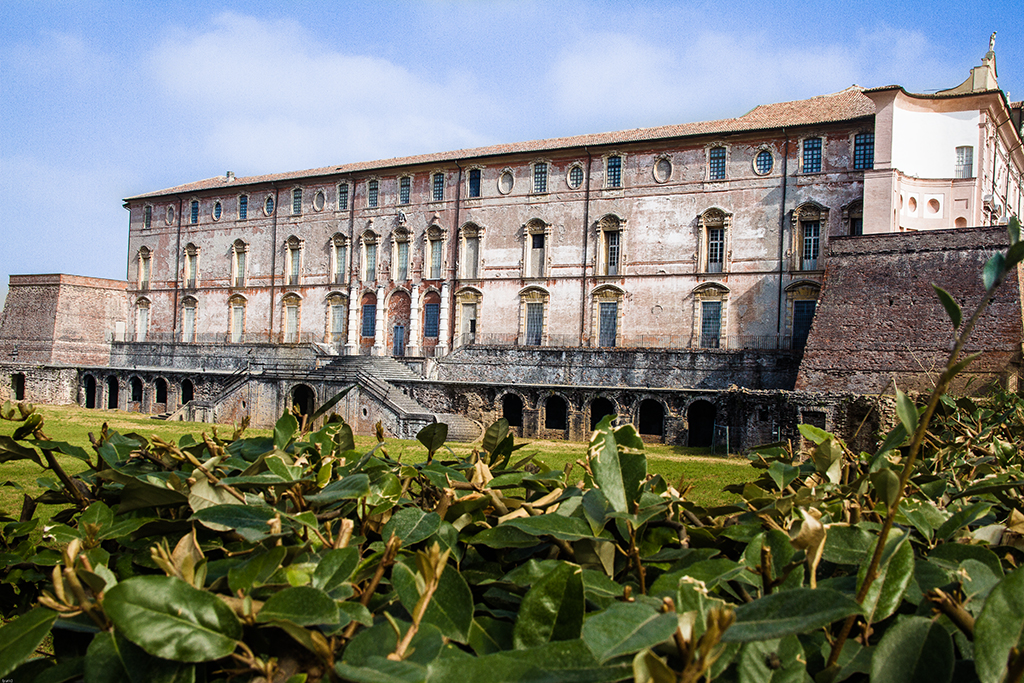
- The Ducal palace

- Flag Coat of arms
- Motto: Sic ex murice gemmae
- Sassuolo within the Province of Modena

- Location within Italy Location within Emilia-Romagna
- Coordinates: 44°32′33″N 10°46′48″E
- Country: Italy
- Region: Emilia-Romagna
- Province: Modena (MO)
- Frazioni: Montegibbio, Salvarola Terme, San Michele dei Mucchietti

Government
  - Mayor: Matteo Mesini (PD)

Area
  - Total: 38.56 km^{2} (14.89 sq mi)
- Elevation: 121 m (397 ft)

Population (2021)
  - Total: 40,219
  - Density: 1,043/km^{2} (2,701/sq mi)
- Demonym: Sassolesi
- Time zone: UTC+1 (CET)
  - Summer (DST): UTC+2 (CEST)
- Postal code: 41049
- Dialing code: 0536
- Patron saint: St. George
- Saint day: 23 April
- Website: www.comune.sassuolo.mo.it

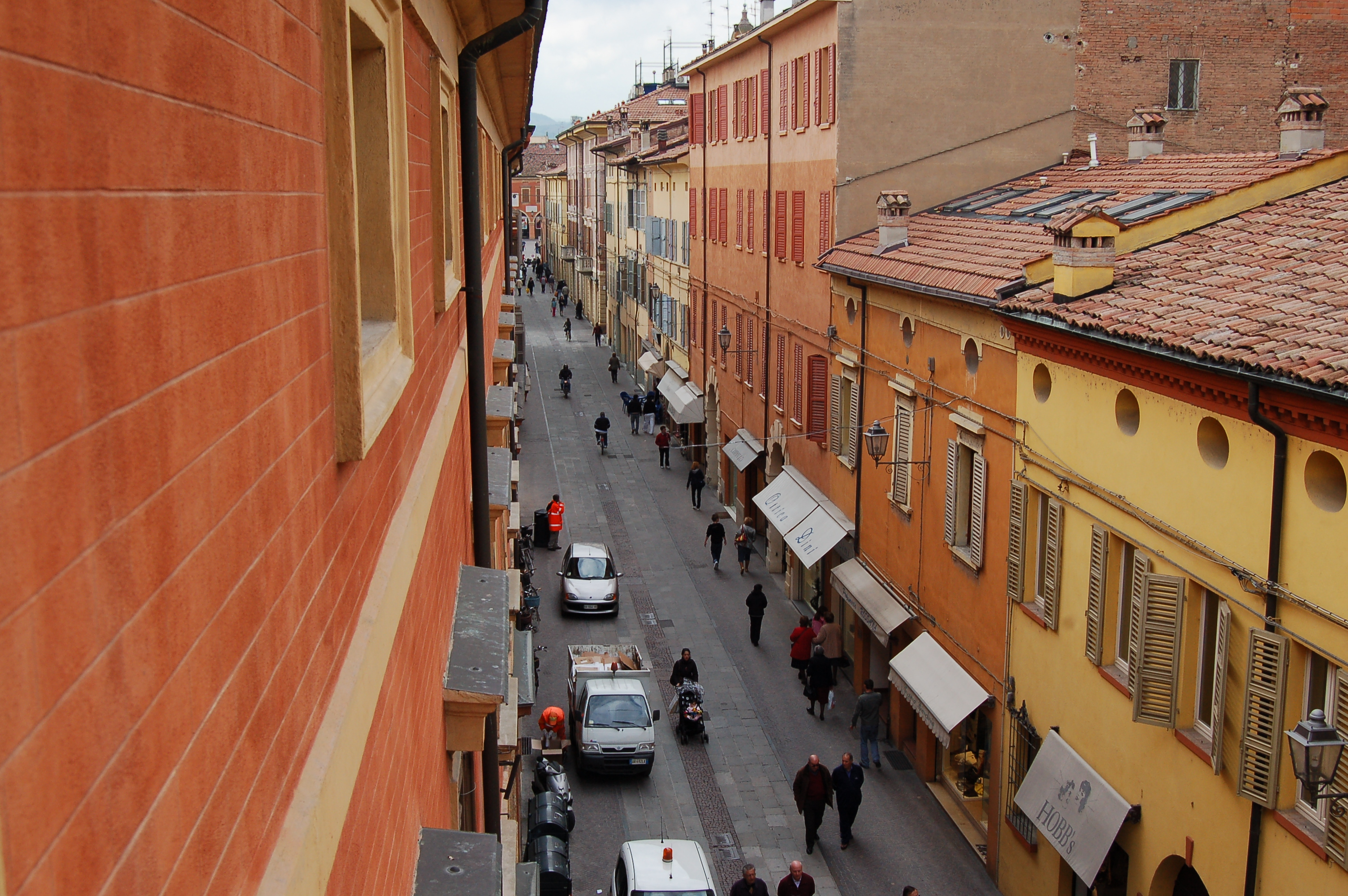
View of Via Ciro Menotti in the town's centre

Sassuolo (Italian: [sasˈswɔːlo]; Modenese: Sasól [saˈsoːl]) is an Italian town and comune (municipality) in the Province of Modena, in Emilia-Romagna. It is an important industrial centre of the area.

Historical population
Year	Pop.	±%
1861	6,017	—
1871	6,438	+7.0%
1881	6,214	−3.5%
1901	7,740	+24.6%
1911	8,514	+10.0%
1921	9,731	+14.3%
1931	11,633	+19.5%
1936	12,958	+11.4%
1951	15,628	+20.6%
1961	23,675	+51.5%
1971	36,079	+52.4%
1981	40,226	+11.5%
1991	40,275	+0.1%
2001	39,852	−1.1%
2011	39,885	+0.1%
2021	40,469	+1.5%
Source: ISTAT

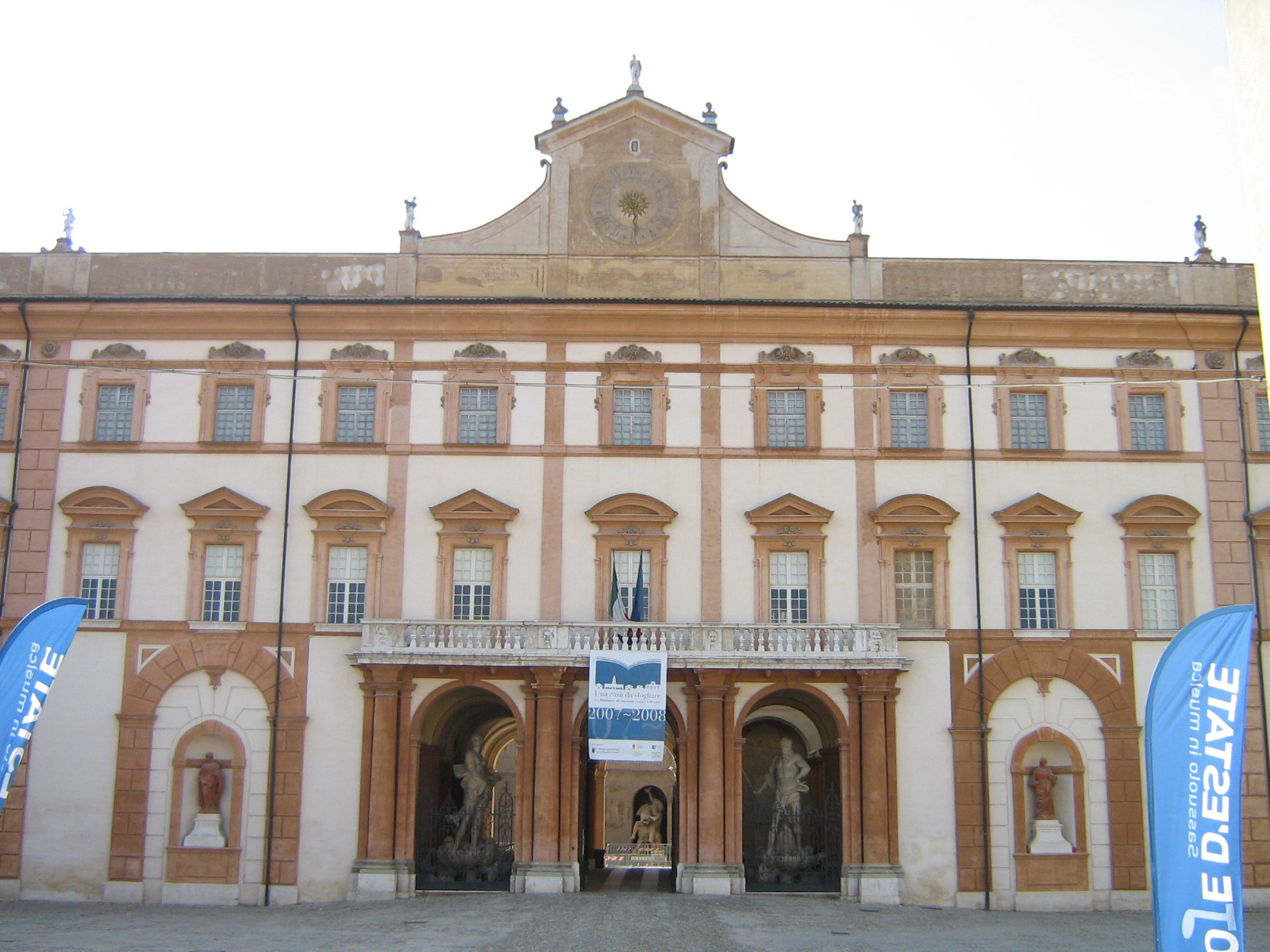
Main facade of the Ducal Palace of Sassuolo

Standing on the right bank of the river Secchia some 17 kilometres (11 mi) southwest of Modena, the town is best known for being the centre of the Italian tile industry and for being the home town of Serie A side U.S. Sassuolo Calcio.

== Etymology ==
The exact origin of the toponym Sassuolo is unclear. One theory is that it might derive from and equivalent of sasso + olio, 'stone oil' i.e. petroleum), due to abundant deposits of petroleum found in the area.

Another hypothesis is that the name derives from the Latin words saxum solum meaning 'rocky soil'. This last theory seems to have inspired both the coat of arms and the town's motto – sic ex murice gemmae – which is Latin for 'thus from the rock, buds'.

== History ==
The territory was inhabited in ancient times by the pile-dwelling terramare civilization, then by an Eastern Ligurian tribe - the Friniates - during the Iron Age. The Celt Boii then settled this land around 400 BC, overlapping with the Friniates. The Boii were the most powerful and numerous Celtic tribe of Northern Italy, or Cisalpine Gaul, which they fiercely defended from the Romans.

Although the archeological evidence is scarce, it is hypothesized that a Roman castrum may have been built in the area because of its strategic position.

The first historical mention of the current settlement dates back to 980. In 1039 the town became part of the domains of Boniface of Canossa and was thus inherited by his daughter Matilda in 1076. In 1078, the consuls of Sassuolo swore loyalty to the commune of Modena. When Matilda died in 1115, the town became independent both from Tuscany and Modena.

In 1373, the city was given to the Este family at the request of the citizens themselves, in exchange for the right to extract water from the river Secchia. The town was then ruled by the Este family until 1499, when it became the capital of the homonymous signoria ruled by the house of Pio. In 1599 the signoria was directly annexed to the Duchy of Modena and Reggio of which it remained a possession until the Italian Unification.

From 1861 onwards, Sassuolo grew both in size and population.

During the Second World War, immediately after the Armistice of Cassibile was made public on 8 September 1943, Sassuolo was swiftly occupied by German troops. The occupation was met with strong resistance from the civilian population, until the town was liberated on 23 April 1945 (Saint George's Day) by the Brazilian Expeditionary Force.

== Geography ==
Located in the central-western area of its province, at the border with Reggio Emilia, Sassuolo borders with the municipalities of Casalgrande (RE), Castellarano (RE), Fiorano Modenese, Formigine, Prignano sulla Secchia and Serramazzoni. It counts the hamlets (frazioni) of Montegibbio, Salvarola Terme and San Michele dei Mucchietti.

== Main sights ==
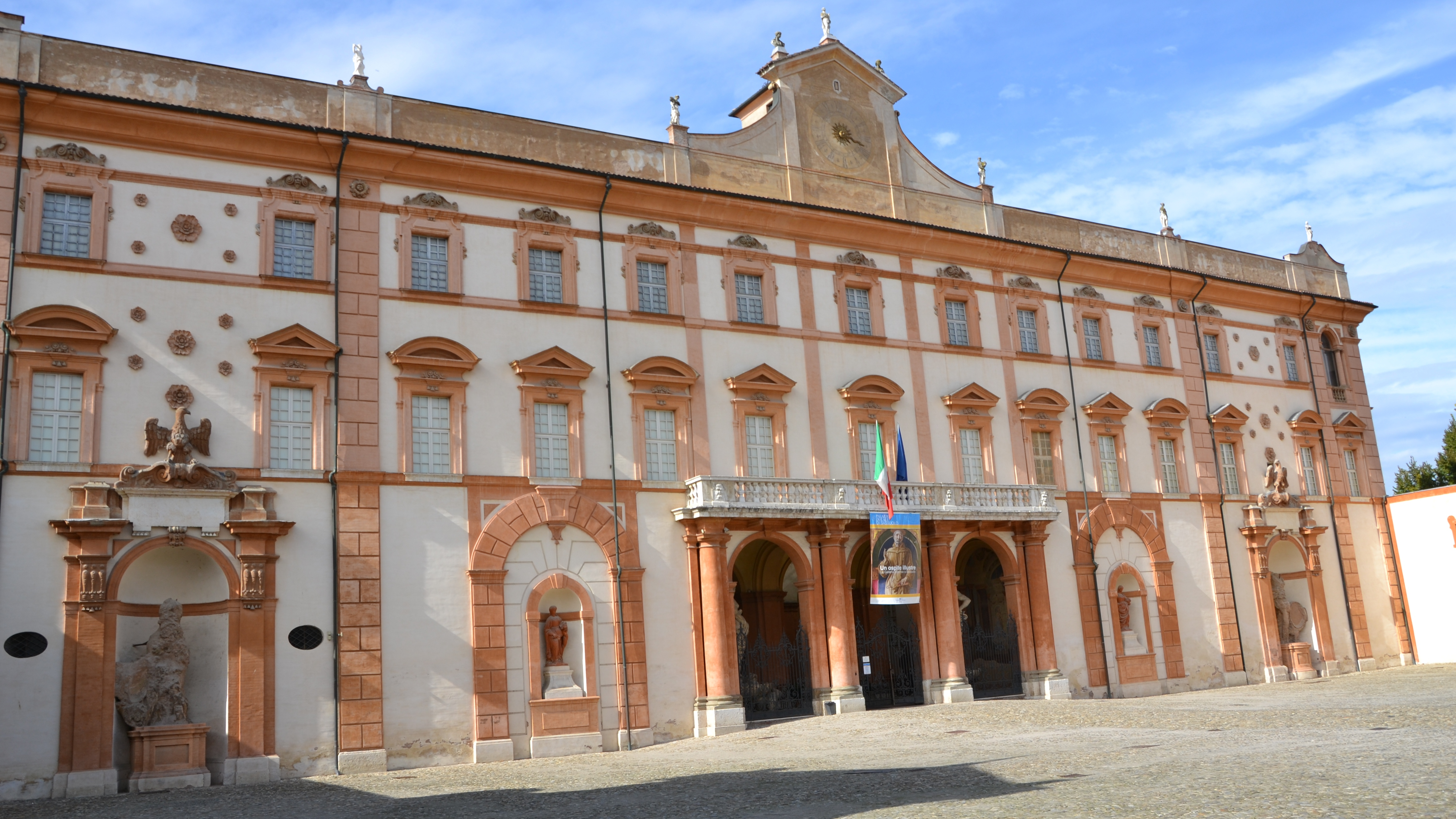
the Ducal palace of Sassuolo

- The Ducal palace of Sassuolo, designed by architect Bartolomeo Avanzini in 1634. In 1638–56 parts of the interior was frescoed by the French Baroque painter Jean Boulanger. Angelo Michele Colonna, Agostino Mitelli, Baldassare Bianchi and Giovanni Giacomo Monti were also invited by Boulanger to work on the palace decoration. Luca Colombi, Giovanni Lazzoni, Lattanzio Maschio, Guercino, Salvator Rosa, Ludovico Lana also contributed. At ground level is a large pool surrounded by ruins, called il Fontanazzo (broadly "the large fountain").
- The church and convent of San Giuseppe.
- The castle of Montegibbio, originally constructed in 920 and destroyed in 1325 and 1501, only to be then rebuilt in 1636.

== Economy ==
The industrial growth of Sassuolo began in the 1950s. Eighty percent of all Italian ceramic tiles are produced here, with more than 300 ceramic factories operating in the Sassuolo district (such as Marazzi Group, Refin and Marca Corona). The city is currently the centre of the Italian tile industry and one of the most important tile producers in the world.

== People ==
- Pierangelo Bertoli (1942–2002), singer-songwriter
- Andrea Bertolini (born 1973), racing car driver
- Caterina Caselli (born 1946), singer and record producer
- Marco Corbelli (1970–2007), musician
- Fabrizio Giovanardi (born 1966), racing car driver
- Giuseppe Medici (1907–2000), politician
- Vittorio Messori (1941–2026), journalist and Christian writer
- Andrea Montermini (born 1964), racing car driver
- Leo Morandi (1923–2009), inventor and ceramist
- Filippo "Nek" Neviani (born 1972), singer-songwriter
- Camillo Ruini (born 1931), cardinal

== Sport ==
Sassuolo is the home town of Serie A side U.S. Sassuolo Calcio; it also includes the stadium Stadio Enzo Ricci. However, the team no longer play games in the city, having moved first to Stadio Alberto Braglia in Modena which was Sassuolo's temporary home while playing in Serie B from 2008 and subsequently to Reggio Emilia at the renovated Stadio Città del Tricolore (formerly Stadio Giglio) in a venue-sharing agreement with Lega Pro Prima Divisione club Reggiana. Upon their promotion to Serie A in 2013, Sassuolo Calcio joined a small group of teams not belonging to a provincial capital city to have played in the highest national division: Empoli, Legnano, Pro Patria, Carpi and Casale.

Volley Sassuolo is the local volleyball team.

The Memorial Argo Manfredini tennis tournament is played in the city.

== Typical products ==
- Sassolino – anise liqueur
- Tiramolla - caramelized sugar exclusively sold during Holy Thursday

== Twin towns ==
- Irsina, Italy
- Lucoli, Italy (since 2011)
