= Mouradian =

Mouradian or Muratyan (Armenian: Մուրադյան) is a common Armenian surname. It may refer to:

- David Mouradian (born 1951), Armenian philologist, writer, film critic and publicist
- John Mouradian, Canadian lacrosse coach
- Khatchig Mouradian, Armenian editor, lecturer, poet, and author
- Mikaël Antoine Mouradian (born 1961), Armenian Catholic bishop in the United States

== See also ==
- Karo Murat (born 1983), real name Karen Muratyan, German professional boxer of Armenian descent
