= Naphtali Keller =

Austrian scholar

Naphtali Keller (25 January 1834 in Tarnów, Galicia – 5 August 1865 in Rožnov (Rožnau, Rosenau), Moravia) was an Austrian scholar. He was the son of Israel Mendel Keller, a well-to-do innkeeper.

Naphtali as a mere youth practised speaking Hebrew with his friend Marcus Weissmann-Chajes and began to write poems in that language. He also acquired a certain amount of modern culture by means of Hebrew educational literature. After losing in business the marriage portion given him by his father-in-law, he went with his wife and four children to Vienna, and there eked out a toilsome existence as a broker.

In 1864 he published with great care and impartiality the first volume of the Hebrew periodical Bikkurim. In the spring of 1865, on the advice of his physician, he went to Rožnov, a watering-place, to seek relief from an illness which had attacked him in the previous year; but he died there.

Keller was the author of 2 stories:

- (1) "Sullam ha-Haẓlaḥah", written in imitation of the "David Barnay" of Julius Rodenberg, and 1st printed in "Ha-Maggid" (1863)
- (2) "Debek lo Tob", a tale of Galician Jewish life, which first appeared in Bikkurim (1866).

These stories were published at Warsaw in 1880 under the collective title Sippure Naftali.
