= Bikkurim =

Bikkurim may refer to:

- Bikkurim (First-fruits), the Hebrew name for the offering of first fruits
- The Bikkurim (Talmud) tractate of the Mishnah and the Talmud
- Bikkurim, periodical published in 1864–5
