= Martin Peak =

Martin Peak may refer to:

- Martin Peak (Antarctica), part of the Thomas Hills
- Martin Peak (Washington), Washington state, United States
- Martin Peak (Olympic Mountains), Washington state, United States
- Martin Peak (Methow Mountains), Washington state, United States
- Pik Martena, Irkutsk Oblast, Russia

== See also ==
- Saint Martin's Peak, Poland
