= Tarnów =

City in Lesser Poland Voivodeship, Poland

- City county
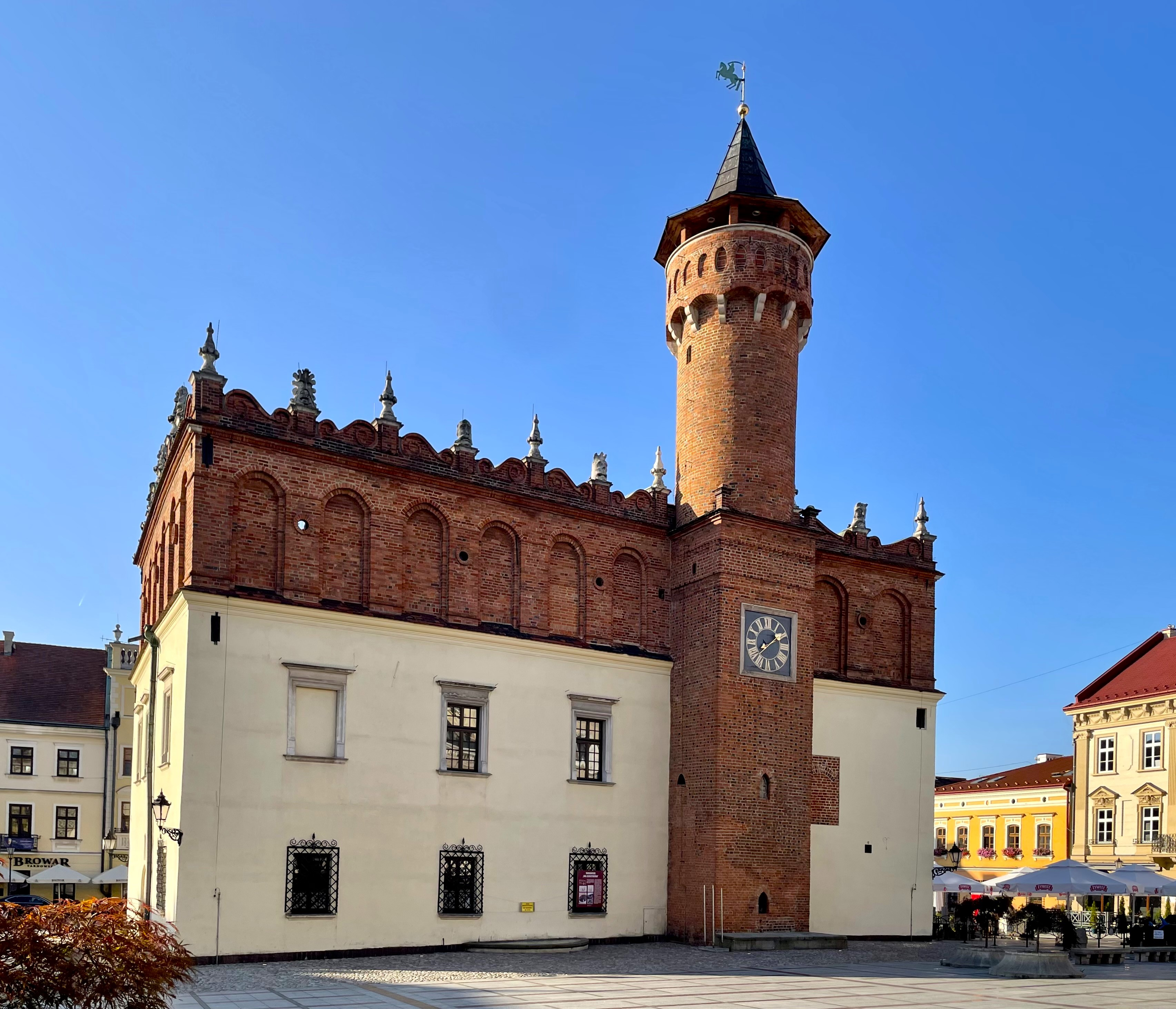
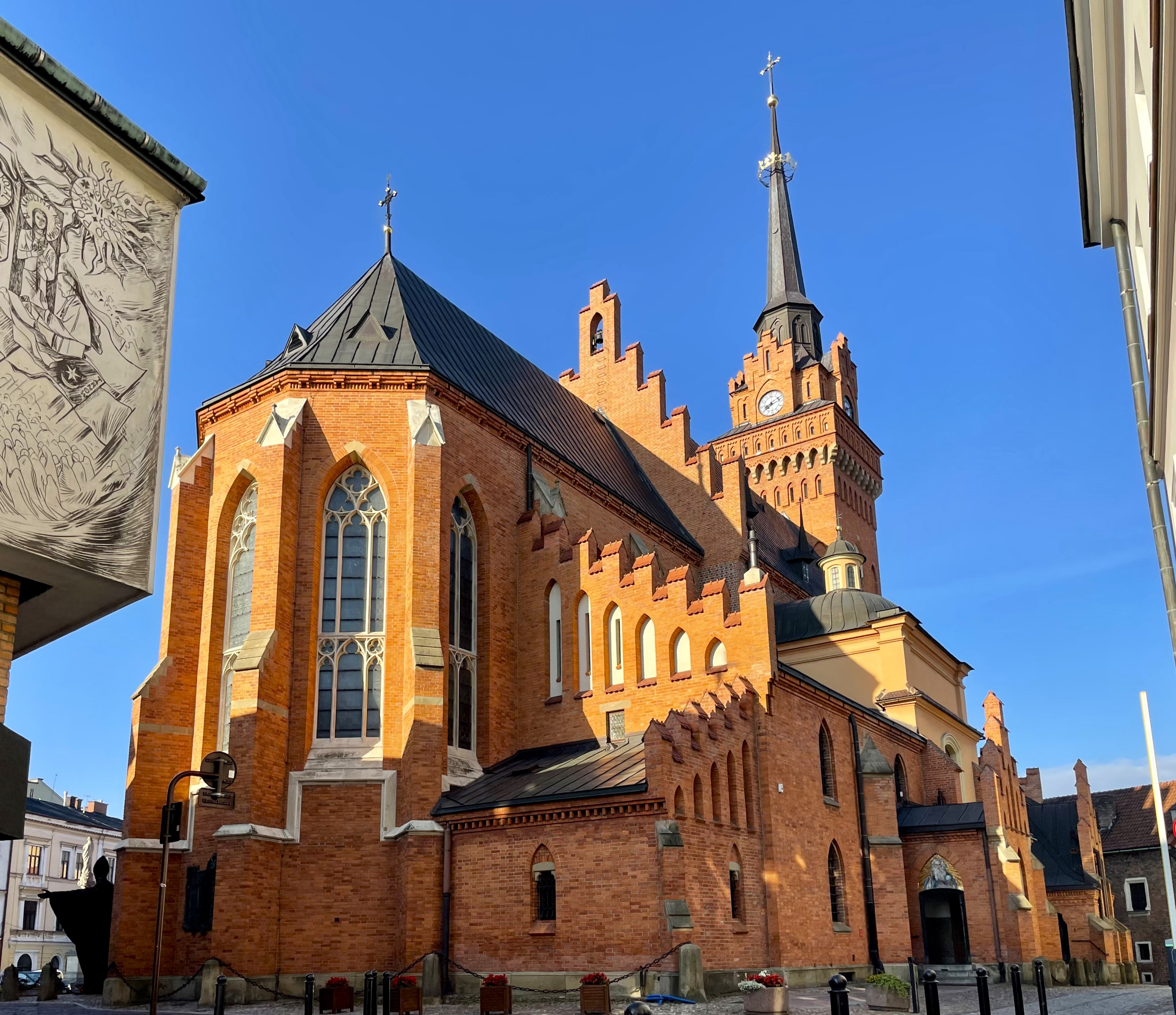
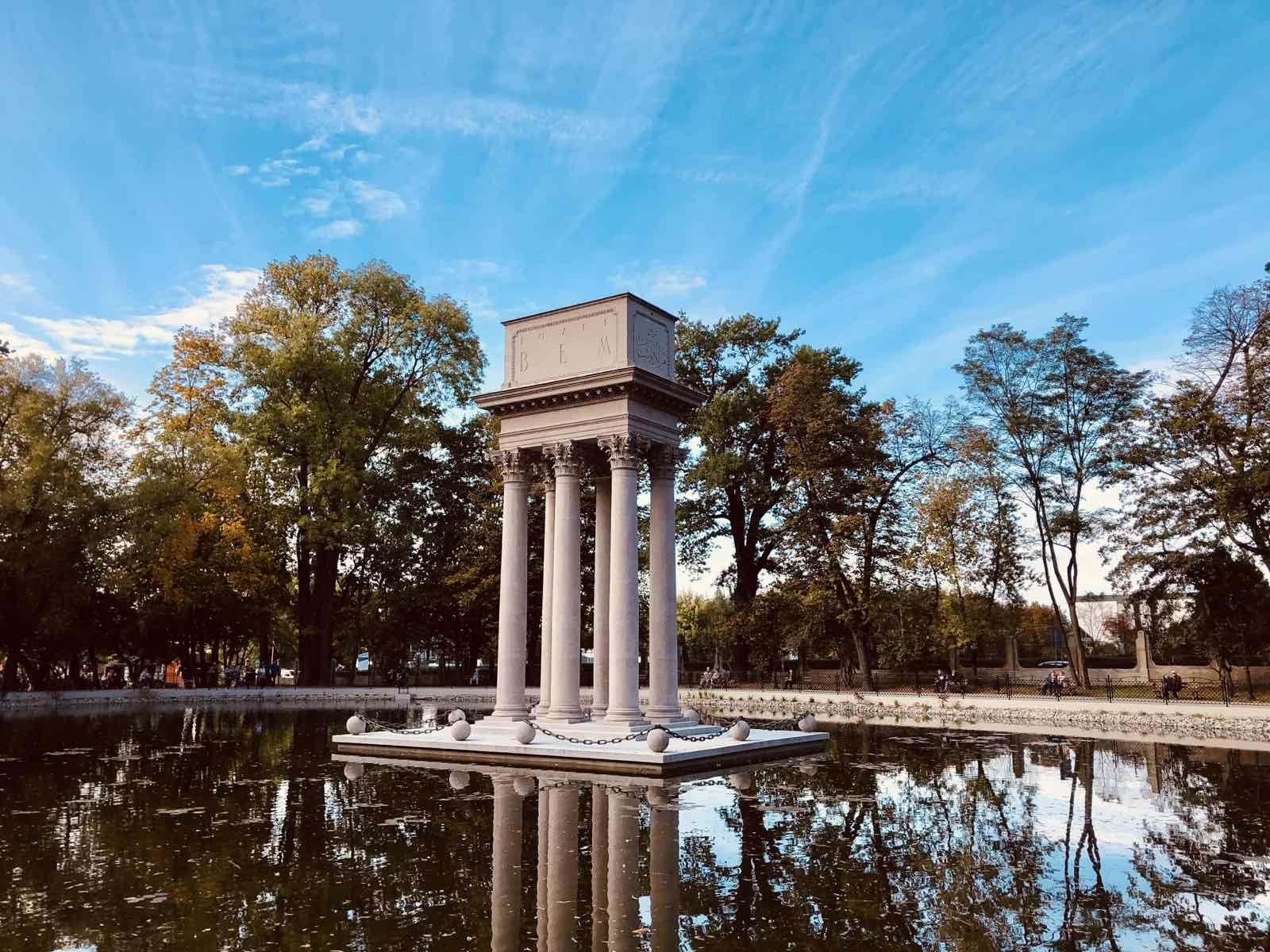
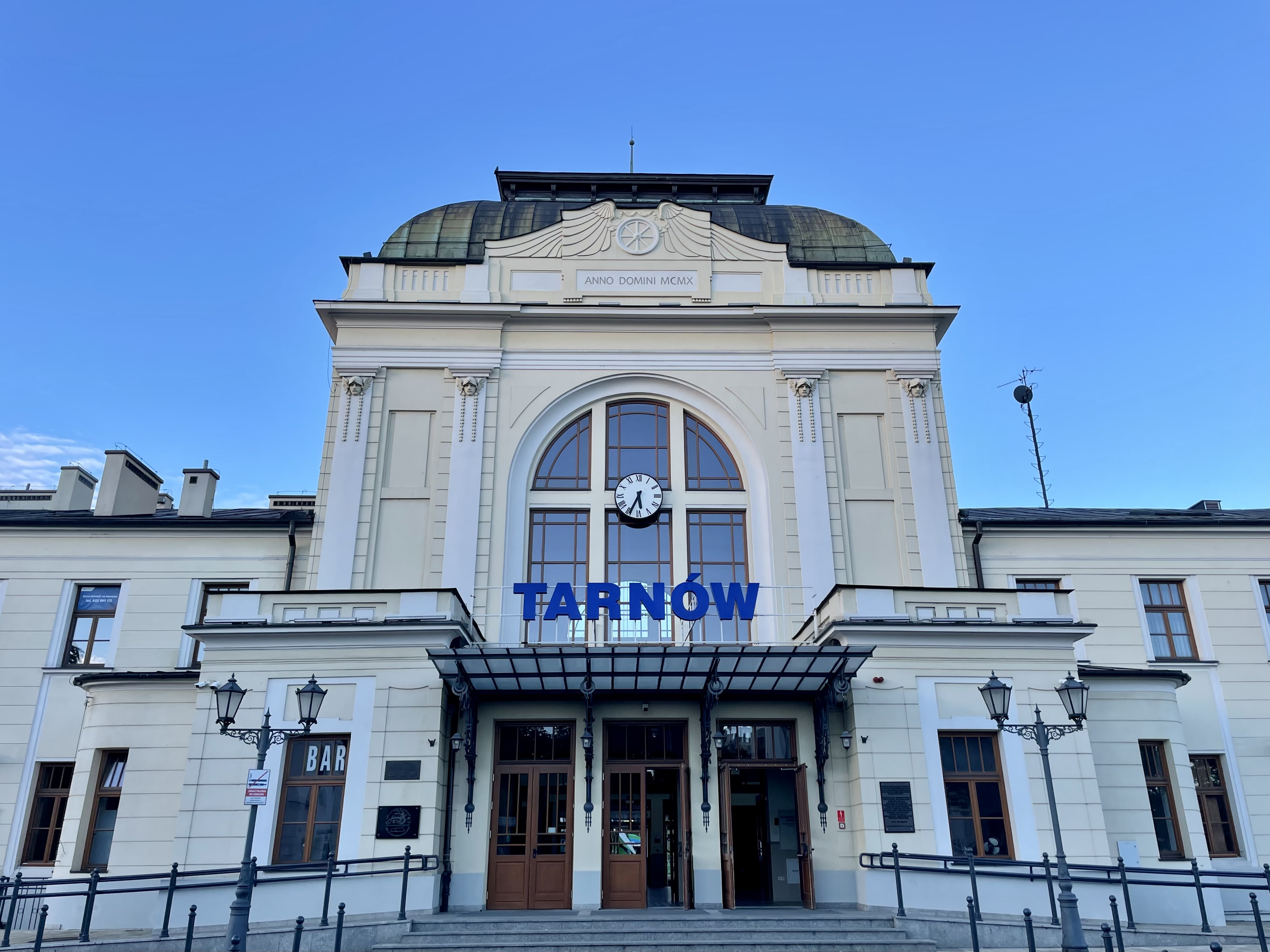
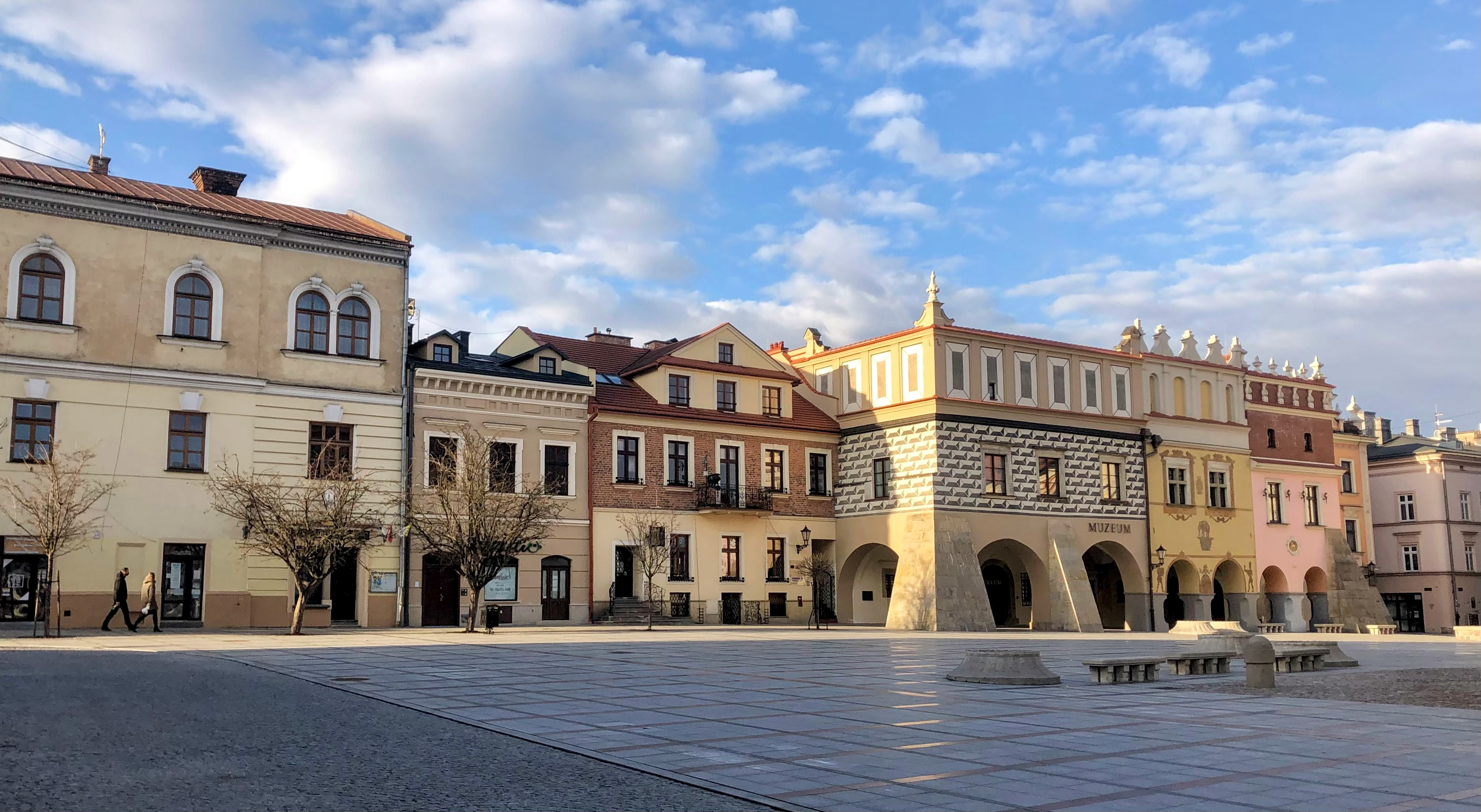
- From top, left to right: Tarnów Town Hall; Tarnów Cathedral; General Józef Bem Mausoleum; railway station; historic townhouses

- Flag Coat of arms
- Interactive map of Tarnów
- Location within Poland
- Coordinates: 50°00′45″N 20°59′19″E
- Country: Poland
- Voivodeship: Lesser Poland
- County: City-County
- City rights: 7 March 1330

Government
  - City mayor: Jakub Kwaśny (IPL)

Area
  - City county: 72.4 km^{2} (28.0 sq mi)
- Highest elevation: 384 m (1,260 ft)

Population (31 December 2021)
  - City county: 105,922 ▼ (35th)
  - Density: 1,460/km^{2} (3,790/sq mi)
  - Metro: 269,000
- Time zone: UTC+1 (CET)
  - Summer (DST): UTC+2 (CEST)
- Postal code: 33–100 to 33–110
- Area code: +48 14
- Car plates: KT
- Website: http://www.tarnow.pl

Historical population
Year	Pop.	±%
1950	37,405	—
1960	70,835	+89.4%
1970	85,929	+21.3%
1980	105,109	+22.3%
1990	121,216	+15.3%
2000	120,822	−0.3%
2010	114,635	−5.1%
2020	107,498	−6.2%

Tarnów (Polish pronunciation: [ˈtarnuf]) is a city in southeastern Poland with 105,922 inhabitants and a metropolitan area population of 269,000 inhabitants. The city is situated in the Lesser Poland Voivodeship. It is a major rail junction, located on the strategic east–west connection from Lviv to Kraków, and two additional lines, one of which links the city with the Slovak border.

Tarnów is known for its traditional Polish architecture, which was influenced by people that lived in the area, most notably Poles, Germans, and Austrians. The Old Town, featuring 16th century tenements, houses and defensive walls, has been preserved. Tarnów is also the warmest city of Poland, with the highest long-term mean annual temperature in the whole country.

Companies headquartered in the city include Poland's largest chemical industry company Grupa Azoty and defence industry company ZMT. The city is currently subdivided into 16 districts and is a member of the Association of Polish Cities (Związek Miast Polskich).

== Names and etymology ==
The first documented mention of the settlement dates back to 1105, spelled as Tharnow. The name later evolved to Tarnowo (1229), Tarnów (1327), and Tharnow (1473). The place name Tarnów is widely used in different forms across Slavic Europe, and lands which used to be inhabited by Slavs, such as eastern Germany, Hungary, and northern Greece. There is a German town, Tarnow, Greek Tyrnavos (also spelled as Tirnovo), Czech Trnov, Bulgarian Veliko Tarnovo and Malko Tarnovo, Slovak Trnava, as well as different Trnovos/Trnowos in Slovenia, Serbia, Bosnia, and North Macedonia. The name Tarnów comes from an early Slavic word trn/tarn, which means "thorn", or an area covered by thorny plants.

== History ==
Already in the mid-9th century, on the Tarnów's St. Martin Mount (Góra sw. Marcina, 2.5 kilometers from the centre of today's city), a Slavic gord was established, probably by the Vistulans. Due to efforts of local archaeologists, we know that the size of the gord was almost 16 hectares, and it was surrounded by a rampart. The settlement was probably destroyed in the 1030s or the 1050s, during either a popular rebellion against Christianity (see Baptism of Poland), or Czech invasion of Lesser Poland. In the mid-11th century, a new gord was established on the Biała river. It was a royal property, which in the late 11th or early 12th century was handed over to the Tyniec Benedictine Abbey. The name Tarnów, with a different spelling, was for the first time mentioned in a document of Papal legate, Cardinal Gilles de Paris (1124).

The first documented mention of Tarnów occurs in the year 1309, when a list of miracles of Kinga of Poland specifies a woman named Marta, who was resident of the settlement. In 1327, a knight named Spicymir (Leliwa coat of arms) purchased a village of Tarnów Wielki, and three years later, founded his own private town. On 7 March 1330, King Władysław I the Elbow-high granted Magdeburg rights to Tarnów. One year later, construction of a castle on the St. Martin Hill was completed by Castellan of Kraków, Spycimir Leliwita of Leliwa coat of arms (its ruins can still be seen).

Tarnów remained in the hands of the Leliwa family, out of which in the 15th century the Tarnowski family emerged. In the 14th century, numerous German settlers immigrated from Kraków and Nowy Sącz (see Walddeutsche, Ostsiedlung). During the 17th century Scottish immigrants began to come in large numbers. In 1528 the exiled King of Hungary János Szapolyai lived in the town. The town prospered during the Polish Golden Age, when it belonged to Hetman Jan Tarnowski (1488–1561). In the mid-16th century, its population was app. 1,200, with 200 houses located within town's defensive wall (the wall itself had been built in the mid-15th century, and expanded in the early 16th century). In 1467, the waterworks and sewage systems were completed, with large cisterns filled with drinking water built in the main market square. In the 16th century, during the period known as the Polish Golden Age, Tarnów had a school, a synagogue, a Calvinist prayer house, Roman Catholic churches, and up to twelve guilds.

=== Polish–Lithuanian Commonwealth ===
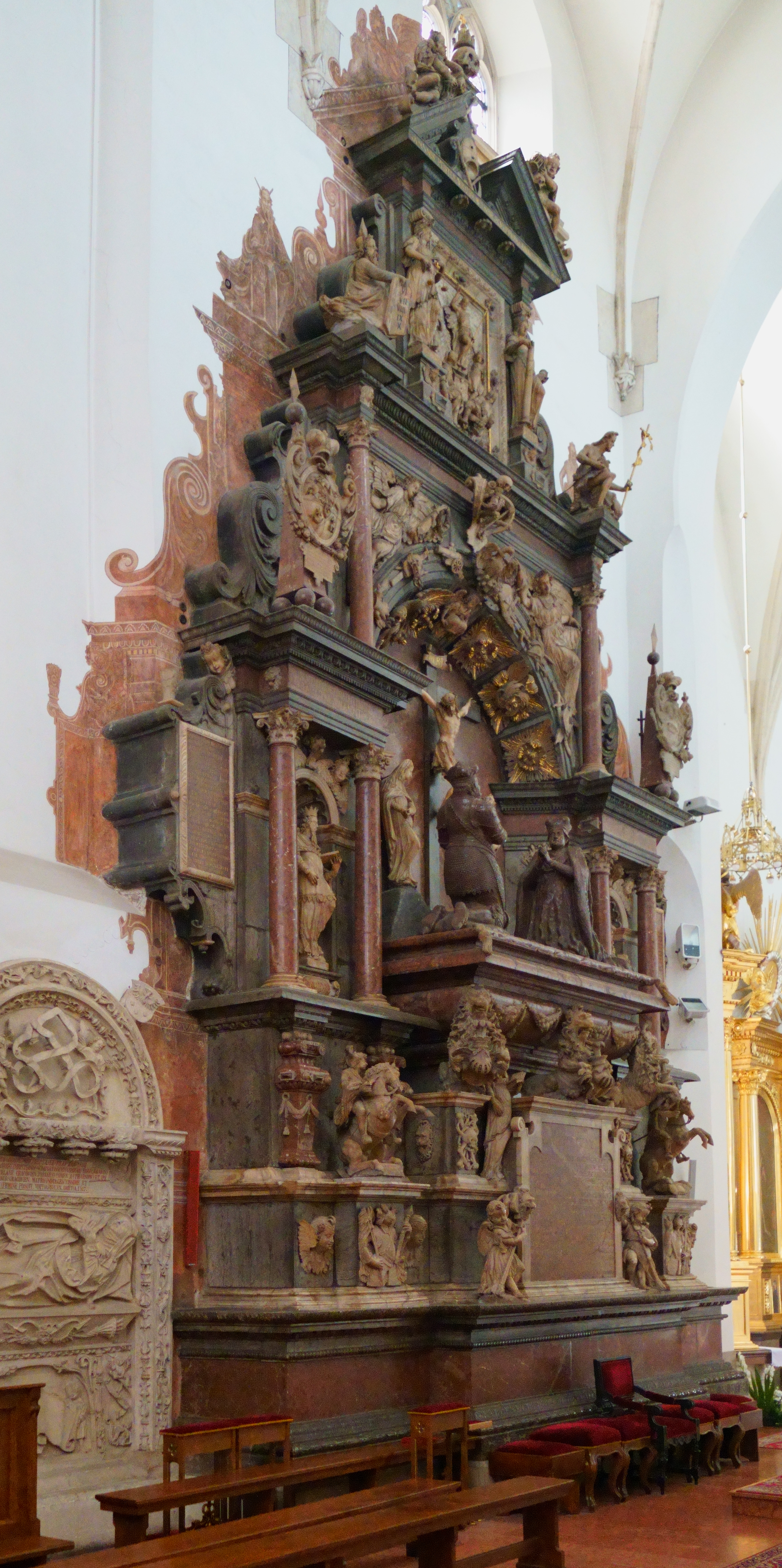
Tarnów Cathedral features one of the finest Renaissance and Mannerist tomb monuments in Poland.

After the death of Jan Tarnowski (16 May 1561), Italian sculptor Jan Maria Padovano began creating one of the most beautiful examples of Renaissance headstones in the Polish–Lithuanian Commonwealth. The monument of hetman Tarnowski is almost 14 meters tall, and stands in St. Anne Chapel, which is located in northern nave of the Tarnów Cathedral. Padovano completed his work in 1573; furthermore, he designed the Renaissance town hall, and oversaw its remodelling in the 1560s. At that time, in 28 niches of the town hall were portraits of members of the Tarnowski family – from Spicymir Leliwita to Jan Krzysztof Tarnowski, who died in 1567. In 1570 Tarnów became property of the Ostrogski family, after Zofia Tarnowska, the daughter of the hetman, married prince Konstanty Wasyl Ostrogski. In 1588, after Konstanty's death, the town changed hands several times, belonging to different families, which slowed its development. Until the Partitions of Poland, Tarnów belonged to the County of Pilzno, Sandomierz Voivodeship. The town, like almost all locations of Lesser Poland, was devastated in October 1655, during the Swedish invasion of Poland, and as a result, its population declined from 2,000 to 768. In 1723, the town became the property of the Sanguszko family, which purchased it from the Lubomirski family.

=== Habsburg Empire ===
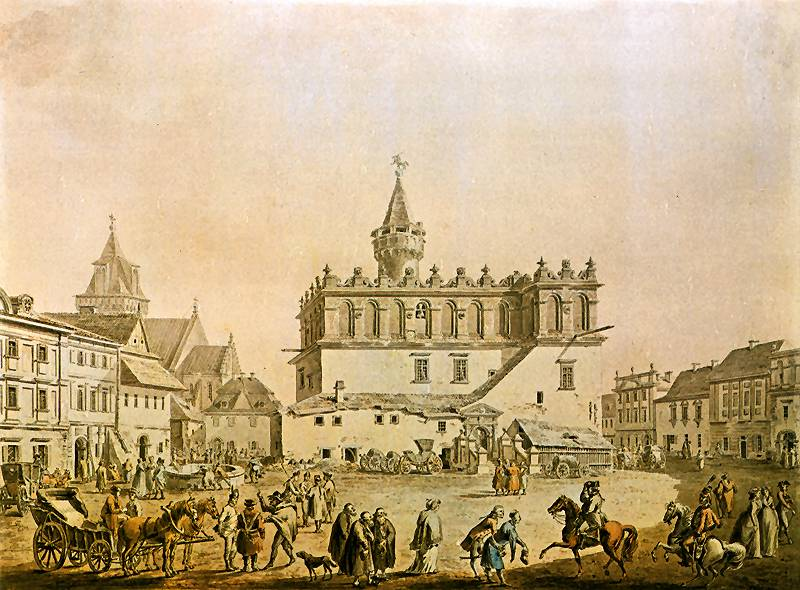
Market Square in Tarnów in 1800, painting by Zygmunt Vogel

After the first partition of Poland (1772), Tarnów was annexed by the Habsburg Empire as part of the new Kingdom of Galicia and Lodomeria, and remained in "Austrian" Galicia until late 1918. Austrian subjugation brought changes, as the town ceased to be private property, became the seat of a county (German: kreis), and of the Roman Catholic Diocese of Tarnów (1783). On 14 March 1794, Józef Bem was born in Tarnów. In the 1830s, under the influence of events in Congress Kingdom of Poland (see November Uprising), Tarnów emerged as a center of Polish conspiratorial organizations. Plans for a national uprising in Galicia failed in early 1846, when local peasants began murdering the nobility in the Galician slaughter. The massacre, led by Jakub Szela (born in Smarżowa), began on 18 February 1846. Szela's peasant units surrounded and attacked manor houses and settlements located in three counties – Sanok, Jasło, and Tarnów. According to Austrians, the revolt got out of hand and the Austrians had to put it down as they were subjugating a previously free people.

Tarnów went through the period of quick development in the second half of the 19th century, due to the program of construction of the railway system. In 1852, the town received rail connection with Kraków, due to the Galician Railway of Archduke Charles Louis, and in 1870, its population was 21,779. In 1878, gas lighting was introduced, and three years later, the first daily newspaper appeared. In 1888, the Diocese Museum was founded by Rev. Jozef Baba, and in 1910, Tarnów received modern waterworks, a power plant and a new complex of the main rail station. The city remained a hotspot of Polish conspirational activities, with up to 20% of all members of the Polish Legions in World War I coming from Tarnów and its area. On 10 November 1914, units of the Russian Imperial Army captured Tarnów, and remained in the city until 6 May 1915 (see Gorlice–Tarnów Offensive). In the early stages of the offensive, Tarnów was shelled by German-Austrian heavy artillery, which brought destruction to some of its districts.

=== Second Polish Republic ===
Landscape plan of the city of Tarnow, 1931

Tarnów was one of the first Polish cities to be freed during the rebirth of Poland following World War I. The Polish Legions liberated the city on the night of 30–31 October 1918. In the Second Polish Republic, Tarnów belonged to Kraków Voivodeship, and gave the newly established country many outstanding figures, such as Franciszek Latinik and Wincenty Witos. In early 1927, construction of a large chemical plant was initiated in the suburban village of Świerczków, which is now a part of the industrial borough of Mościce, a district of the city. Before the outbreak of World War II, the population of Tarnów was 40,000, of which almost half were Jewish. On 28 August 1939, a German Nazi saboteur conducted the Tarnów rail station bomb attack killing 20 civilians and wounding 35, four days before the invasion of Poland by Nazi Germany and the outbreak of World War II in Europe.

=== World War II ===
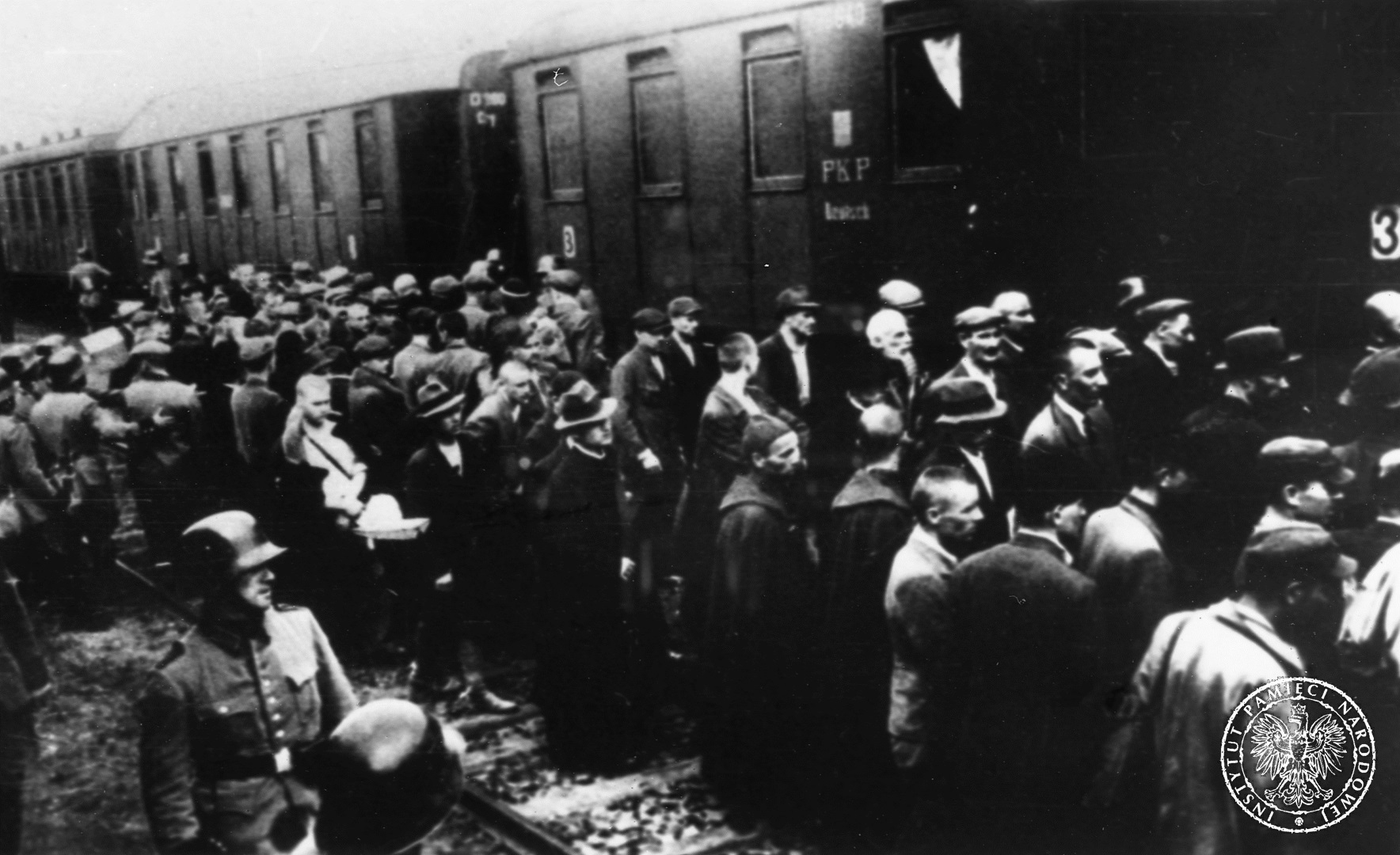
First transport of Polish captives deported from Tarnów to Auschwitz concentration camp during German AB-Aktion in Poland, June 1940

During the German invasion of Poland, the city was overrun by the German forces on 7 September 1939. Under German occupation, Tarnów was incorporated into the General Government territory as the seat of the Kreishauptmanschaft Tarnow administrative unit in the Kraków District on 26 October 1939.

In September 1939, the Einsatzgruppe I entered the city to commit atrocities against Poles, and the Einsatzgruppe zbV entered to take over the Polish industry. Poles expelled in December 1939 from various places in German-annexed western Poland were deported in freight trains to Tarnów. On 14 June 1940, the first mass transport left the Tarnów station to Auschwitz concentration camp, with 728 Polish political prisoners, including at least 67 underage boys. All throughout the German occupation of Poland Tarnów was an important center of the Armia Krajowa (AK) and other resistance organizations. In mid-1944 AK's 16th Infantry Regiment "Barbara" took part in Operation Tempest. After the Warsaw Uprising, in October 1944, the Germans deported 3,000 Varsovians from the Dulag 121 camp in Pruszków, where they were initially imprisoned, to Tarnów. Those Poles were mainly old people, ill people and women with children. The Wehrmacht retreated from Tarnów on 18 January 1945, and the city was captured by the Red Army, and then restored to Poland.

==== The Jews of Tarnów ====
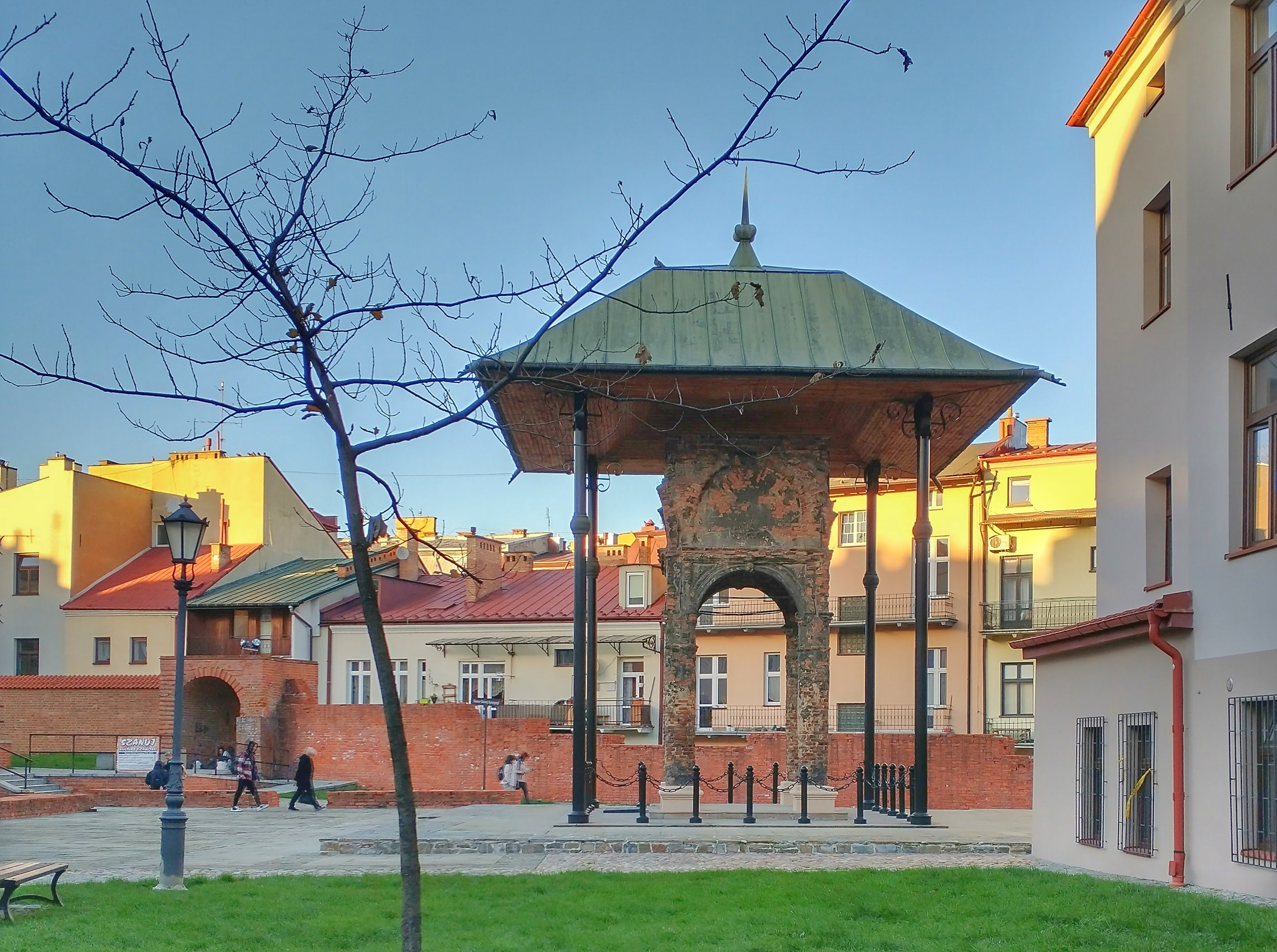
Remaining bimah of the Old Synagogue of Tarnów

Before World War II, about 25,000 Jews lived in Tarnów. Jews, whose recorded presence in the town went back to the mid-15th century, comprised about half of the town's total population. A large portion of Jewish business in Tarnów was devoted to garment and hat manufacturing. The Jewish community was ideologically diverse and included religious Hasidim, secular Zionists, and many more.

Immediately following the German occupation of the city on 8 September 1939, the persecution of the Jews began. German units burned down most of the city's synagogues on 9 September and drafted Jews for forced-labor projects. Tarnów was incorporated into the Generalgouvernement. Many Tarnów Jews fled to the east, while a large influx of refugees from elsewhere in occupied Poland continued to increase the town's Jewish population. In early November, the Germans ordered the establishment of a Jewish council (Judenrat) to transmit orders and regulations to the Jewish community. Among the duties of the Jewish council were enforcement of special taxation on the community and providing workers for forced labor.

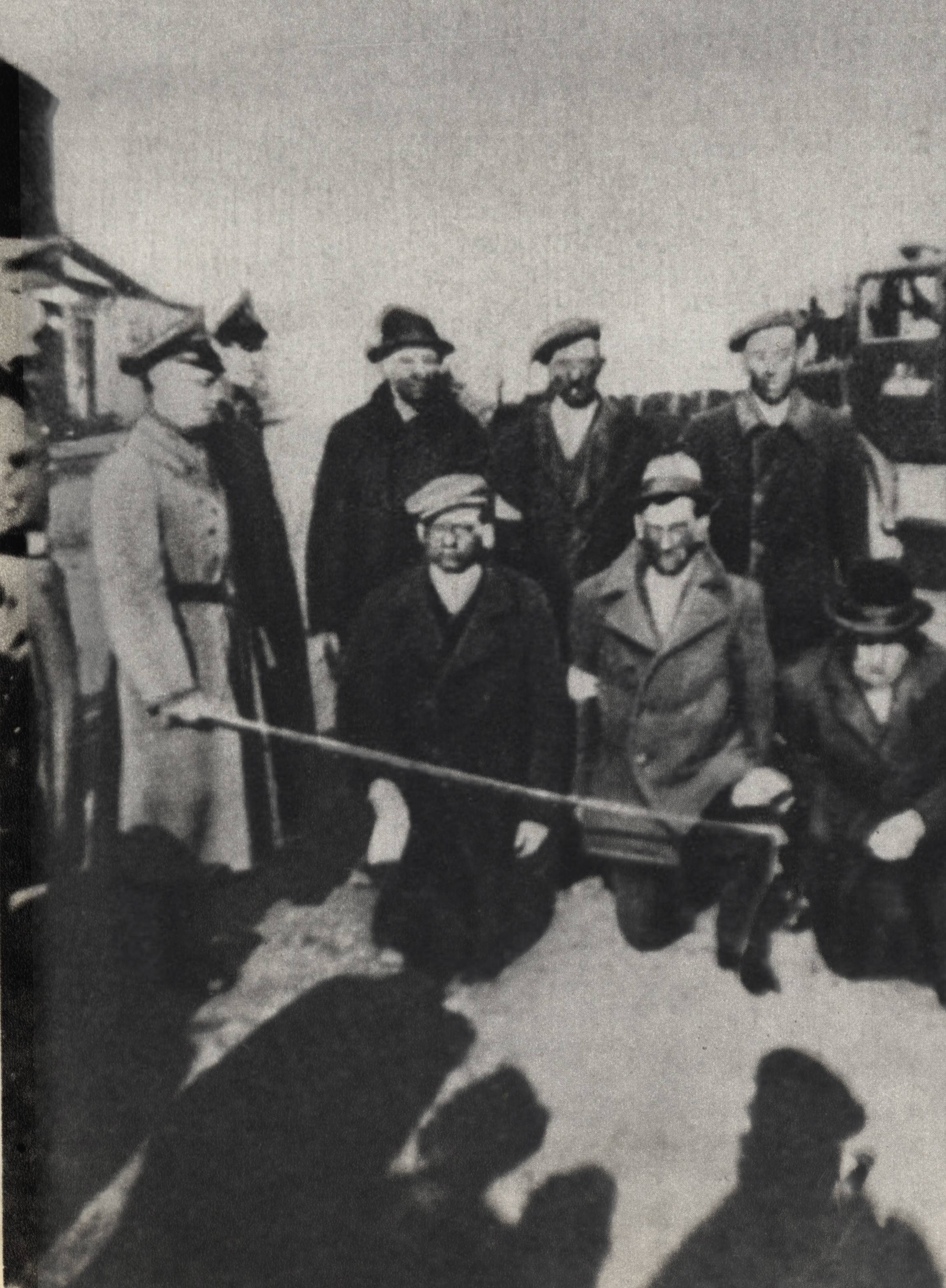
Jewish men humiliated and tortured by German policemen

During 1941, life for the Jews of Tarnów became increasingly precarious. The Germans imposed a large collective fine on the community. Jews were required to hand in their valuables. Roundups for labor became more frequent and killings became more commonplace and arbitrary. Deportations from Tarnów began in June 1942, when about 13,500 Jews were sent to the Belzec extermination camp. The first major act in the extermination of the Jews of Tarnów was the so-called "first operation" from 11–19 June 1942. The Germans gathered thousands of Jews in the Rynek (market place), and then they were tortured and killed. During this time period, on the streets of the town and in the Jewish cemetery, about 3,000 Jews were shot; in the woods of Zbylitowska Góra a few kilometers away from Tarnów a further 7,000 were murdered. According to a document from Michal Borawski born in 1926, featured at the entry of the Bimah as part of the panel offered by the Batory Foundation, the street stairs ("małe schody" or little stairs) from the town-center to the Bernardynski street (where the Bernardine Monastery is located), had to be cleaned of the blood by the local fire brigade for three days.

Poles gave shelter to several Jewish escapees from the ghetto, however, several Poles were eventually captured and murdered by the Germans for rescuing Jews. Many Poles were imprisoned by the Germans in the local prison for rescuing and helping Jews and then often deported to Auschwitz and other concentration camps, in which some died, while some fortunately survived until the end of the war.

After the June deportations, the Germans forced the surviving Jews of Tarnów, along with thousands of Jews from neighboring towns, into the new Tarnów Ghetto. The ghetto was surrounded by a high wooden fence. Living conditions in the ghetto were deplorable, marked by severe food shortages, a lack of sanitary facilities, and a forced-labor regimen in factories and workshops producing goods for the German war industry. In September 1942, the Germans ordered all ghetto residents to report to Targowica Square, where they were subjected to a 'selection' in which those deemed 'non-essential' were singled out for deportation to Belzec. About 8,000 people were deported. Thereafter, deportations from Tarnów to extermination camps continued sporadically; the Germans deported a group of 2,500 in November 1942.

==== Holocaust resistance ====
In the midst of the 1942 deportations, some Jews in Tarnów organized a Jewish resistance movement. Many of the resistance leaders were young Zionists involved in the Hashomer Hatzair youth movement. Many of those who left the ghetto to join the partisans fighting in the forests later fell in battle with SS units. Other resisters sought to establish escape routes to Hungary, but with limited success. The Germans decided to destroy the Tarnów ghetto in September 1943. The surviving 10,000 Jews were deported, 7,000 of them to Auschwitz and 3,000 to the Plaszow concentration camp in Kraków. In late 1943, Tarnów was declared "free of Jews" (Judenrein). By the end of the war, the overwhelming majority of Tarnów Jews had been murdered by the Germans. Although 700 Jews returned in 1945, some of them soon left the city. Many moved to Israel.

==== Property restoration ====
The church of Our Lady of the Scapular in Tarnów was built on a plot that was illegally obtained by the parish from the descendants of Jewish Holocaust survivors. In 2016, following a lengthy legal battle, a three judge panel found the church had acted in bad faith and had no legal rights to the property. A year later the case was re-opened after the church appealed to the local district attorney, with the personal involvement of Minister of Justice Zbigniew Ziobro.

=== Post-war period ===
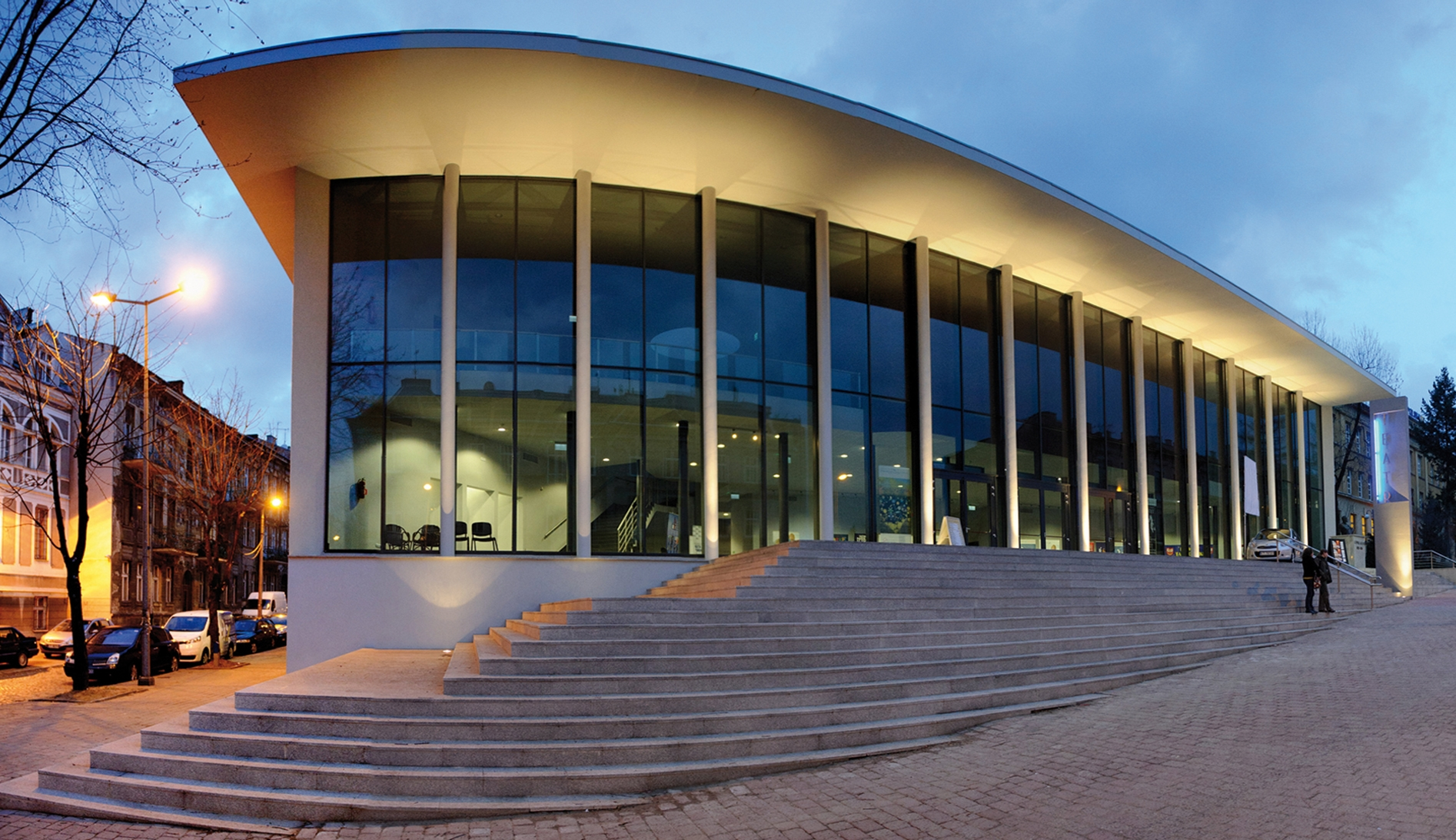
Ludwik Solski Theatre

A few months later, the Museum of Tarnów Land was opened, and Tarnów began a postwar recovery. In 1957, State Theatre of Ludwik Solski was opened. From 1975 to 1998, it was the capital of the Tarnów Voivodeship.

== Geography ==
Tarnów lies at the Carpathian foothills, on the Dunajec and the Biała rivers. The area of the city is 72.4 square kilometres (28.0 sq mi). It is divided into sixteen districts, known in Polish as osiedla. A few kilometers west of the city lies the district of Mościce, built in the late 1920s, together with a large chemical plant. Located to the southeast is Saint Martin's Peak. The district was named after President of Poland, Ignacy Mościcki.

=== Climate ===
Its climate is classified as marine west coast (Cfb) by Köppen. Tarnów is one of the warmest cities in Poland. The average temperature in January is −0.4 °C (31 °F) and 19.8 °C (68 °F) in July. It is claimed that Tarnów has the longest summer in Poland spreading from mid May to mid September (above 118 days).

Climate data for Tarnów (1991–2020 normals, extremes 1951–present)
Month	Jan	Feb	Mar	Apr	May	Jun	Jul	Aug	Sep	Oct	Nov	Dec	Year
Record high °C (°F)	15.8 (60.4)	20.6 (69.1)	25.5 (77.9)	31.1 (88.0)	33.4 (92.1)	36.1 (97.0)	37.7 (99.9)	37.9 (100.2)	36.8 (98.2)	27.6 (81.7)	22.1 (71.8)	19.5 (67.1)	37.9 (100.2)
Mean daily maximum °C (°F)	2.1 (35.8)	4.0 (39.2)	8.8 (47.8)	15.5 (59.9)	20.4 (68.7)	23.7 (74.7)	25.6 (78.1)	25.5 (77.9)	19.9 (67.8)	14.4 (57.9)	8.3 (46.9)	3.2 (37.8)	14.3 (57.7)
Daily mean °C (°F)	−1.1 (30.0)	0.2 (32.4)	3.9 (39.0)	9.7 (49.5)	14.4 (57.9)	17.9 (64.2)	19.6 (67.3)	19.1 (66.4)	14.1 (57.4)	9.4 (48.9)	4.7 (40.5)	0.3 (32.5)	9.4 (48.9)
Mean daily minimum °C (°F)	−4.0 (24.8)	−3.0 (26.6)	−0.1 (31.8)	4.3 (39.7)	8.7 (47.7)	12.2 (54.0)	13.9 (57.0)	13.4 (56.1)	9.3 (48.7)	5.4 (41.7)	1.8 (35.2)	−2.5 (27.5)	5.0 (41.0)
Record low °C (°F)	−30.3 (−22.5)	−28.2 (−18.8)	−24.6 (−12.3)	−7.5 (18.5)	−3.2 (26.2)	0.2 (32.4)	5.5 (41.9)	2.9 (37.2)	−3.0 (26.6)	−7.8 (18.0)	−15.8 (3.6)	−27.6 (−17.7)	−30.3 (−22.5)
Average precipitation mm (inches)	34.7 (1.37)	33.7 (1.33)	38.5 (1.52)	53.2 (2.09)	92.1 (3.63)	92.8 (3.65)	107.2 (4.22)	66.4 (2.61)	71.8 (2.83)	51.5 (2.03)	38.0 (1.50)	33.2 (1.31)	713.2 (28.08)
Average extreme snow depth cm (inches)	9.2 (3.6)	11.2 (4.4)	6.1 (2.4)	2.3 (0.9)	0.0 (0.0)	0.0 (0.0)	0.0 (0.0)	0.0 (0.0)	0.0 (0.0)	0.5 (0.2)	4.3 (1.7)	5.7 (2.2)	11.2 (4.4)
Average precipitation days (≥ 0.1 mm)	17.07	14.66	14.77	13.37	15.03	14.57	14.97	11.87	12.47	13.17	13.21	15.08	170.22
Average snowy days (≥ 0 cm)	18.6	16.7	7.3	1.1	0.0	0.0	0.0	0.0	0.0	0.4	5.3	12.7	62.1
Average relative humidity (%)	82.2	79.1	73.6	68.2	70.7	72.1	73.2	73.9	78.9	80.9	82.9	83.2	76.6
Mean monthly sunshine hours	51.3	69.9	120.1	176.2	222.0	230.0	240.3	235.6	155.0	115.9	60.9	45.6	1,722.7
Source 1: Institute of Meteorology and Water Management
Source 2: Meteomodel.pl (records, relative humidity 1991–2020)

== Economy ==
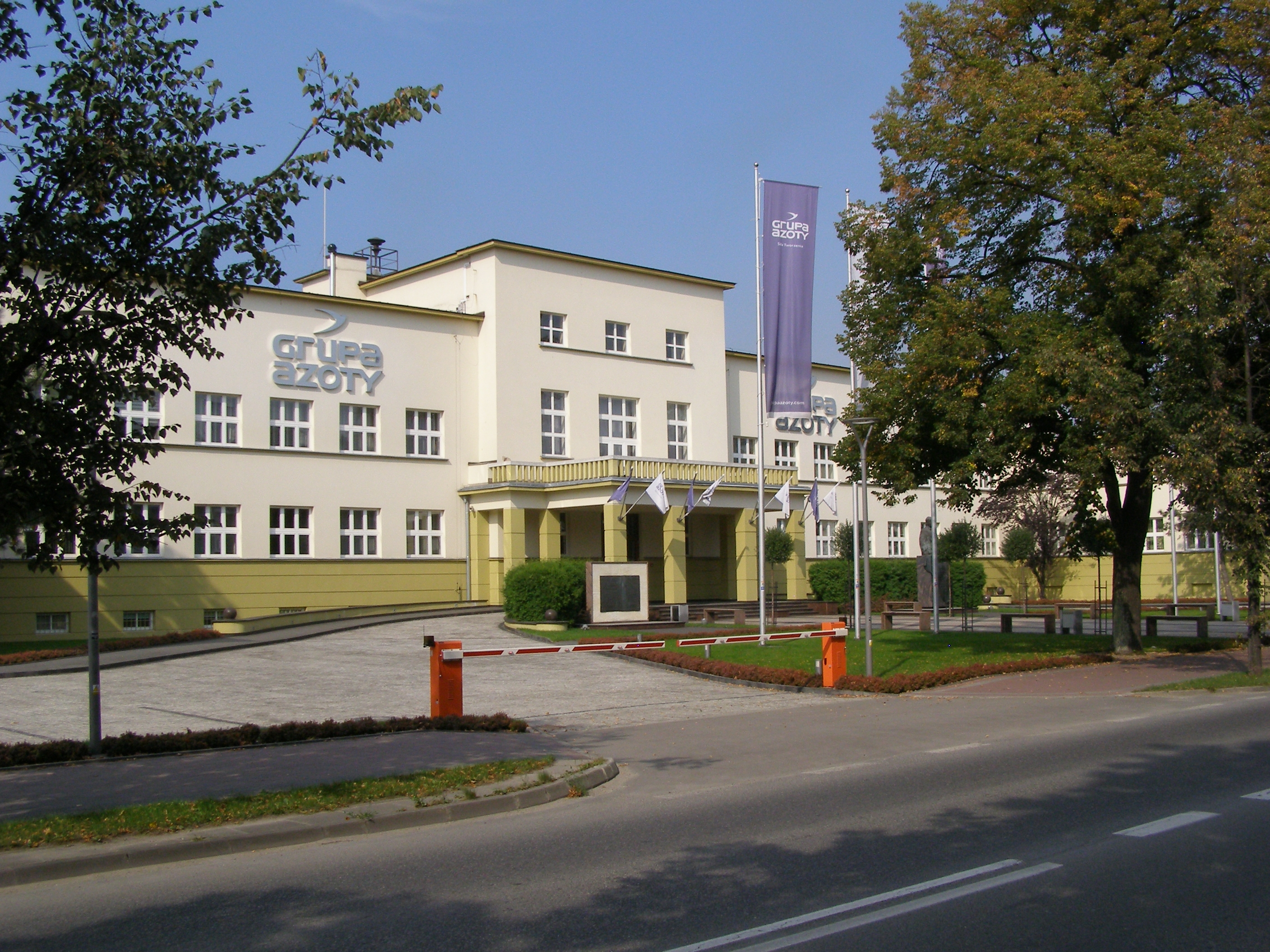
Grupa Azoty headquarters in Tarnów's industrial district Mościce

Tarnów is an important center of economy and industry. The city has chemical plants including Zakłady Azotowe w Tarnowie-Mościcach S.A., which is part of Poland's biggest company operating within the chemical sector Grupa Azoty, Becker Farby Przemysłowe Sp. z o.o., Summit Packaging Polska Sp. z o.o.; as well as food plants (Fritar), building materials (Leier Polska S.A., Bruk-Bet), textiles (Spółdzielnia "Tarnowska Odzież, Tarnospin, Tarkonfex"), and several warehouses, as well as a distribution center of the Lidl supermarket chain. Tarnów is an important center of natural gas industry, with headquarters of three different gas corporations.

Another significant company based in Tarnów is the Zakłady Mechaniczne Tarnów operating in the defence industry. It manufactures handguns, assault rifles, sniper rifles and anti-air guns. It is part of the state-controlled Bumar Corporation.

Among the major shopping malls in Tarnów are the Gemini Park Tarnów and Galeria Tarnovia.

== Transport ==
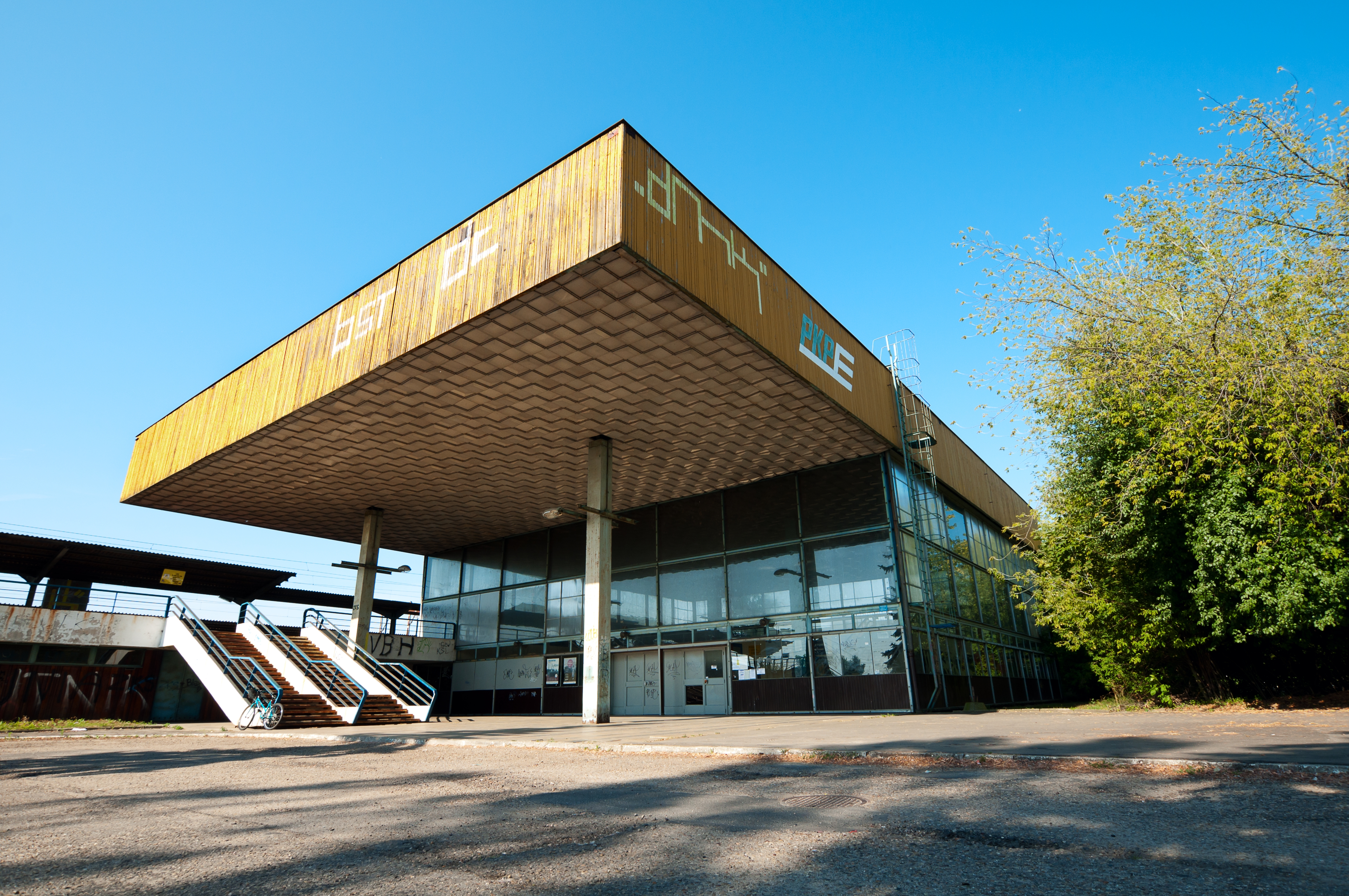
Railway station in Tarnów Mościce (1976) was registered as a historical monument of modern architecture (2021).

Tarnów is an important road and railway hub. It lies at the intersection of two major roads – the motorway along European route E40, and the National Road No. 73, which goes from Kielce to Jasło. Furthermore, the city is a rail junction, with four lines: three main electrified routes (westward to Kraków, eastward to Dębica and southward to Nowy Sącz), as well as secondary-importance local connection to Szczucin. The history of rail transport in Tarnów dates back to the year 1856, when the Galician Railway of Archduke Charles Louis reached the city. The architectural complex of Tarnów Main Station, fashioned after the Lviv railway station was completed in 1906 in the Austrian Partition of Poland. Since 2010, Tarnów station has housed a gallery of modern art, the only such gallery located in a railway station in Poland. Tarnów also has three additional stations: Tarnów Mościce, as well as Tarnów Północny and Tarnów Klikowa, both of which are currently out of service.

The city's public transport system consists of 29 municipal bus routes, which provide convenient connections to all districts. In 1911–1942 Tarnów had a tram line, with the length of 2.5 kilometres, since replaced by buses.

== Politics ==
Members of Parliament (Sejm) elected from Tarnów constituency in 2005 included: Urszula Augustyn, PO, Edward Czesak, PiS, Aleksander Grad, PO, Barbara Marianowska, PiS, Józef Rojek, PiS, Wiesław Woda, PSL and Michał Wojtkiewicz, PiS. Member of the European Parliament elected in 2007, and Consul General at the Consulate General of the Republic of Poland in New York City, was Urszula Gacek, PO, EPP-ED.

== Tourism ==
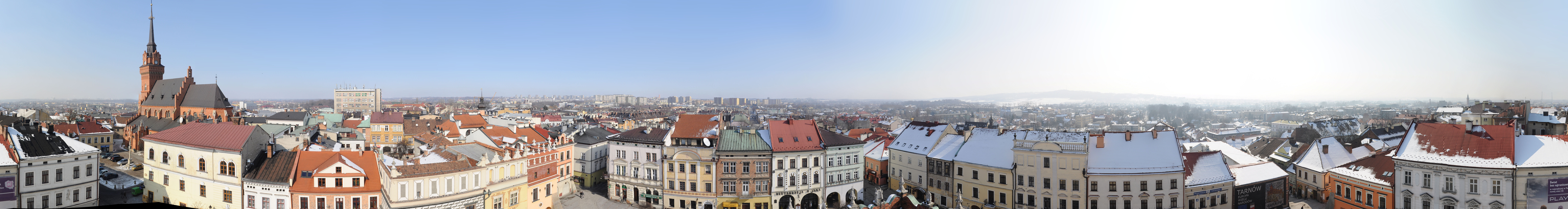
Panorama of the Old Town in Tarnów

Tarnów is an important tourist, cultural and economic center in Lesser Poland Voivodeship. The old town of Tarnów, called the "pearl of the Polish Renaissance", is one of the most beautiful examples of the Renaissance architectural layout of Polish cities. In 2022, CNN included Tarnów on the list of "Europe's most beautiful towns".

Tourist Information

Detailed information about the city, tourist attractions, cultural events and other things are provided by Tourist Information Center, located in the southern part of Main Square. Office is well equipped with a wide variety of brochures and souvenirs, it also serves as a bike rental spot, luggage storage and small guesthouse (4 rooms/8 beds).

Tourist Information Center

- Rynek 7, 33–100 Tarnów V-IX.

== Attractions ==
Points of interest around the city include:

- Market Square in the Old Town, with the medieval urban layout of streets and tenement houses, some from the Renaissance period
- Town Hall (14th century, rebuilt in 16th century)
- Tarnów Cathedral (14th century)
- Mikołajowski House (1524), the oldest tenement house in Tarnow
- Remains of the Tarnowski family castle
- Remains of the Old Synagogue
- Remains of the 14th – 16th century defensive wall
- 16th century two fortified towers
- Jewish Cemetery (1583)
- Holy Trinity church (1597)
- Wooden Church of Our Lady of the Scapular (1589)
- Bernadine Abbey complex (1776)
- Late 16th century Florentine House
- 18th and 19th century manor houses in the suburbs
- Exaltation of the Holy Cross Church (1776)
- Old Cemetery (late 18th century)
- Sanguszko Palace (1799)
- Railway Station (1855)
- Strzelecki City Park (1866)
- Nalepówka Villa (1860s)
- Diocesan Museum in Tarnów (1888)
- Church of the Holy Family (1906)
- Eugeniusz Kwiatkowski villa in Mościce (1928)
- General Józef Bem Mausoleum (1929)
- Modernist Church of the Holiest Heart of Jesus (1935)
- Modernist Church of the Blessed Virgin Mary Queen of Poland (1956)

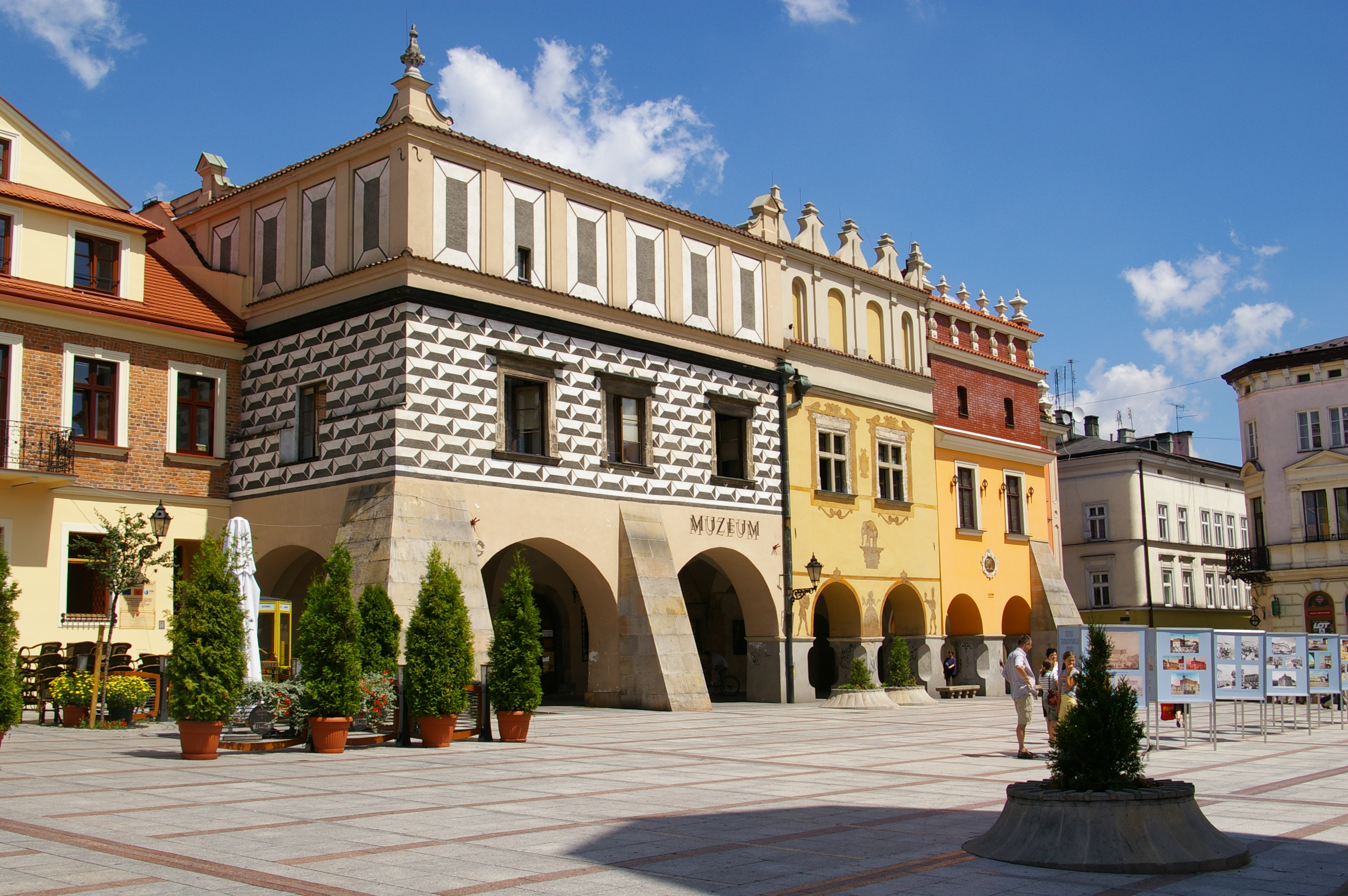
Market Square with historic and colourful tenements

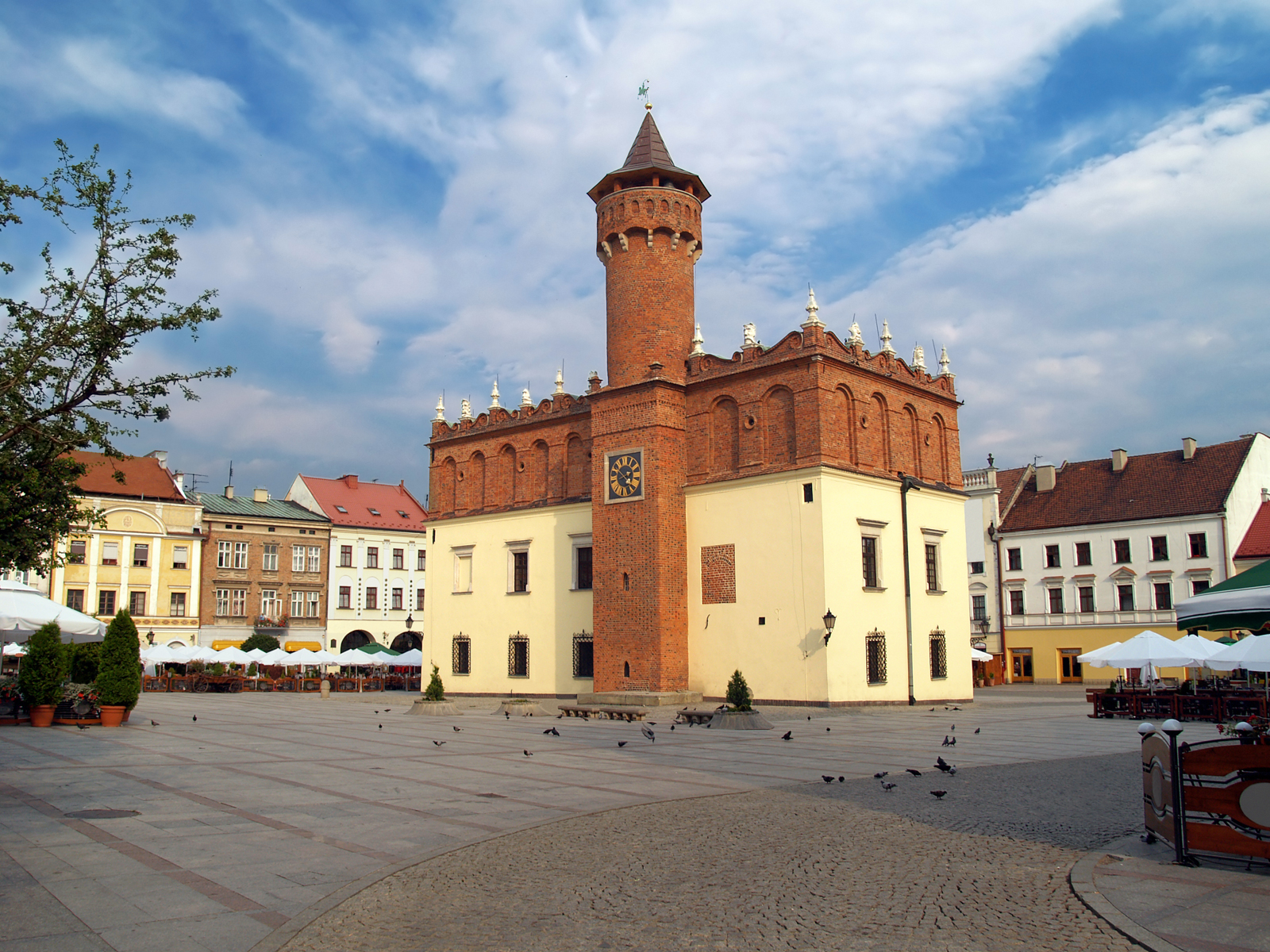
Town hall

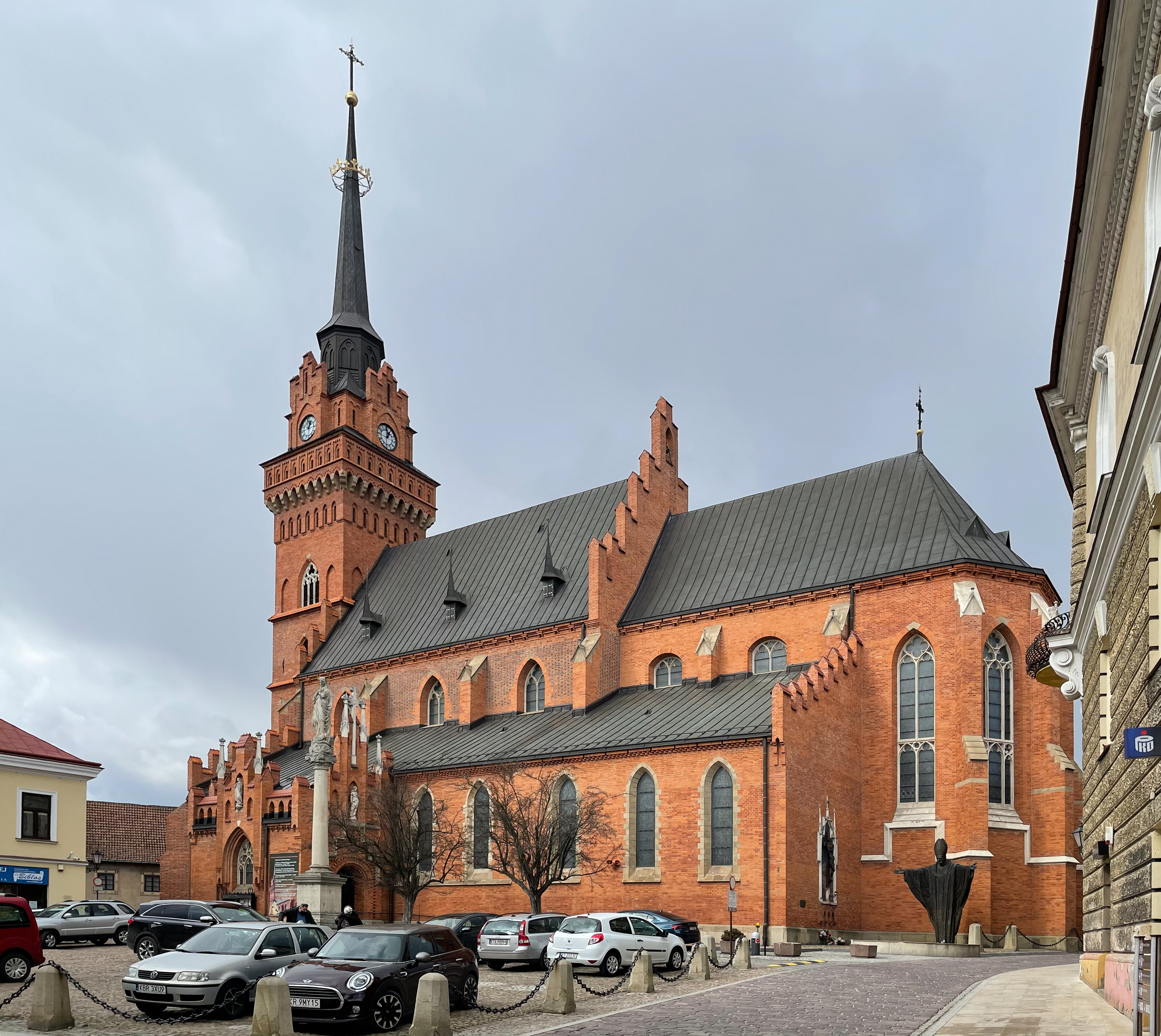
Cathedral of the Nativity

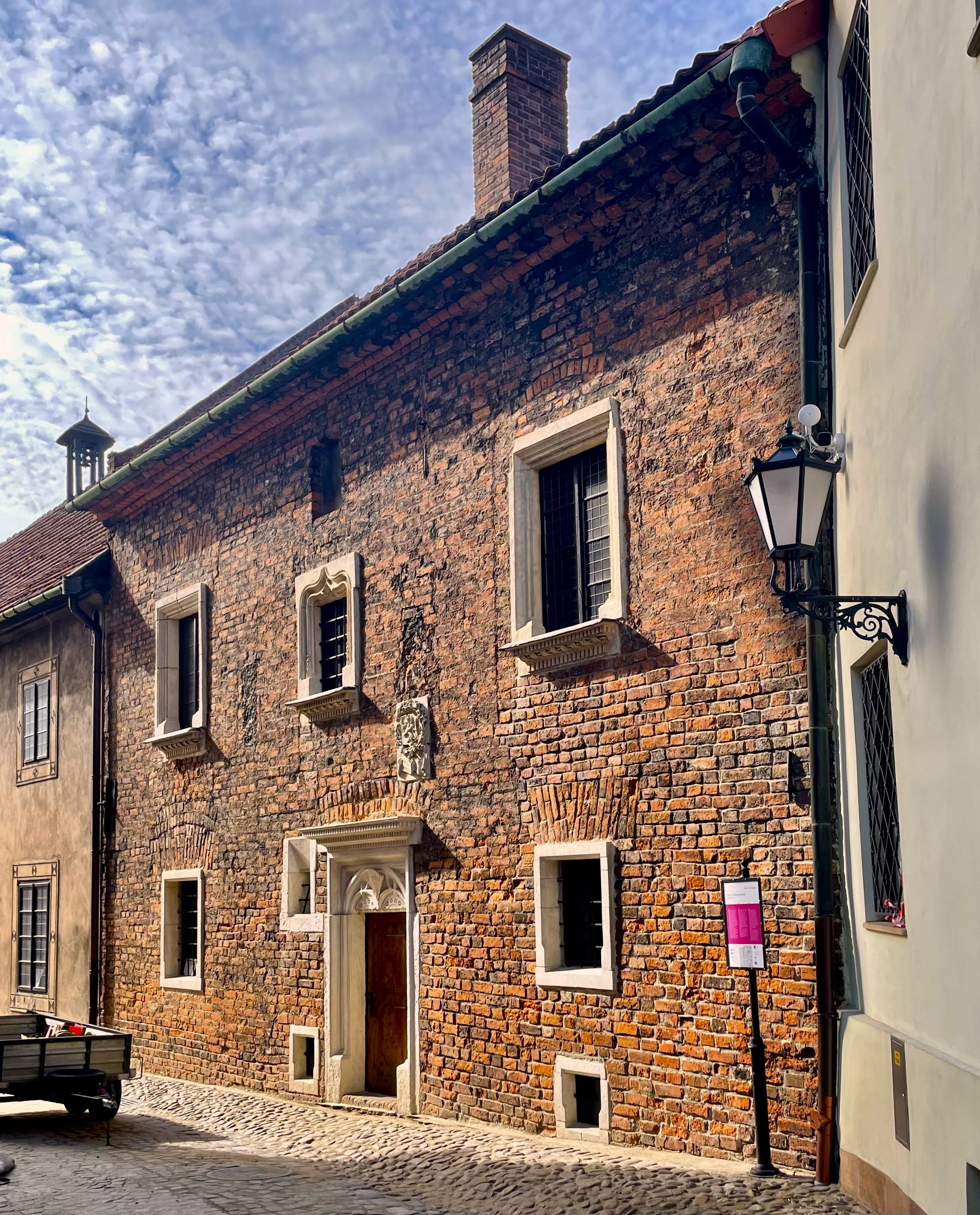
Mikołajowski House

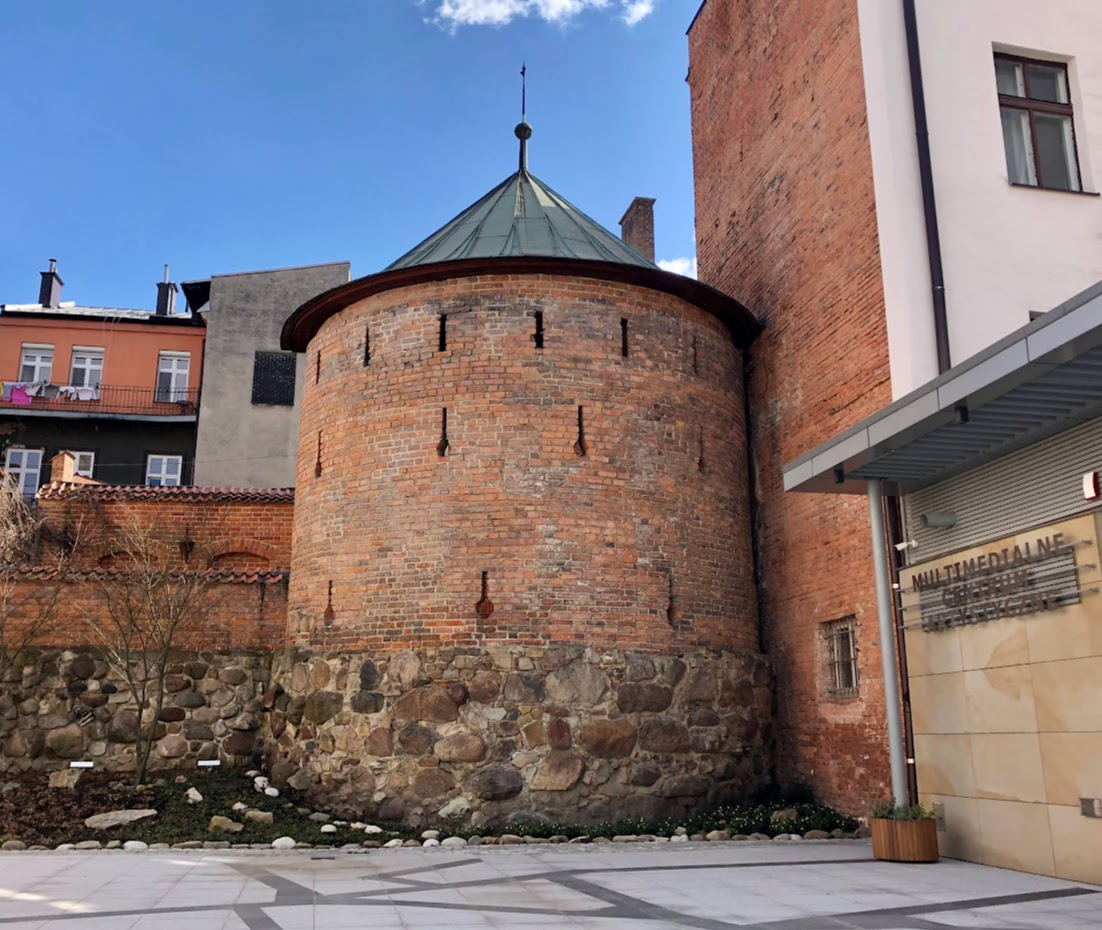
16th-century fortified tower

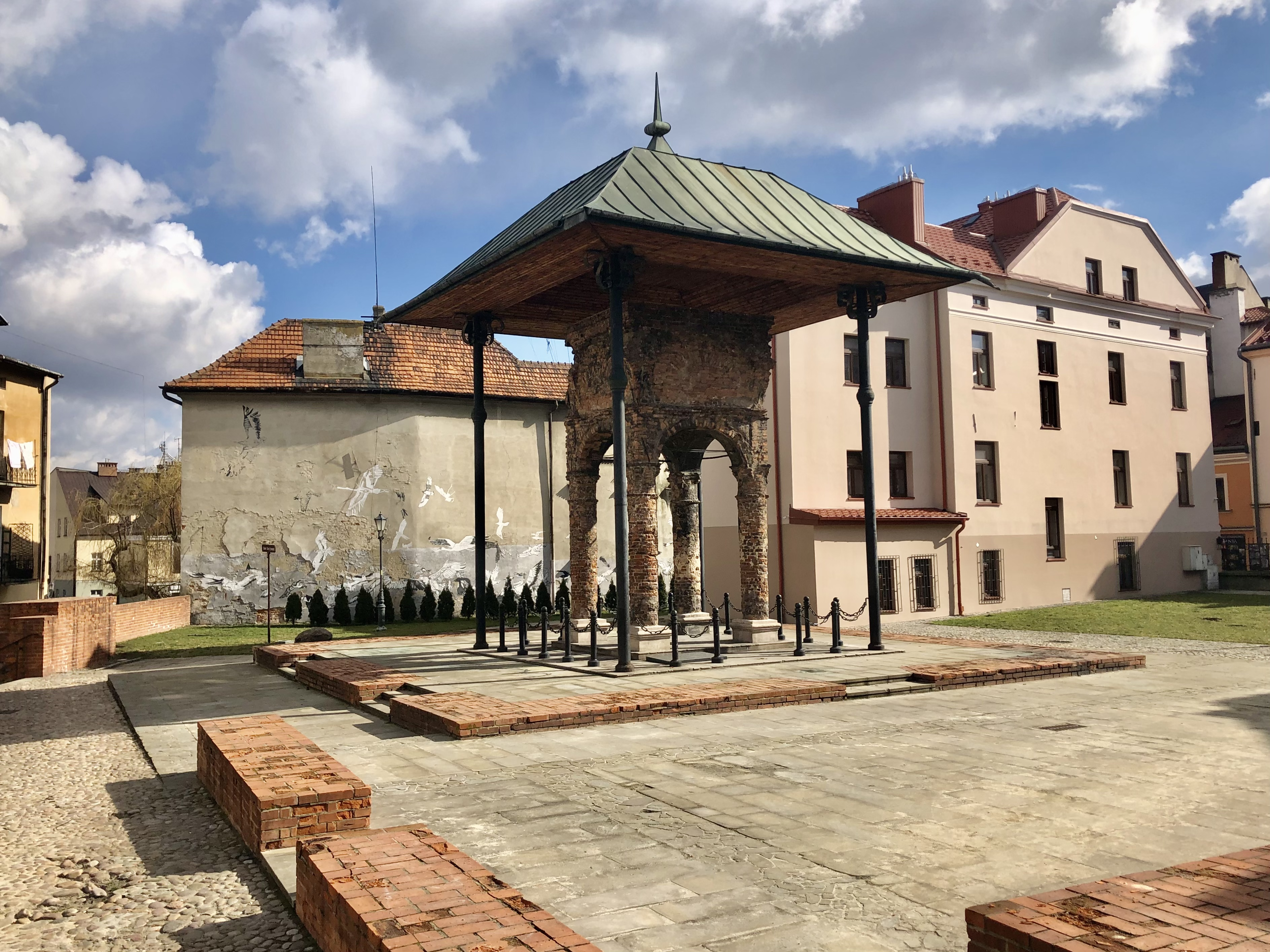
Existing remains of the old synagogue

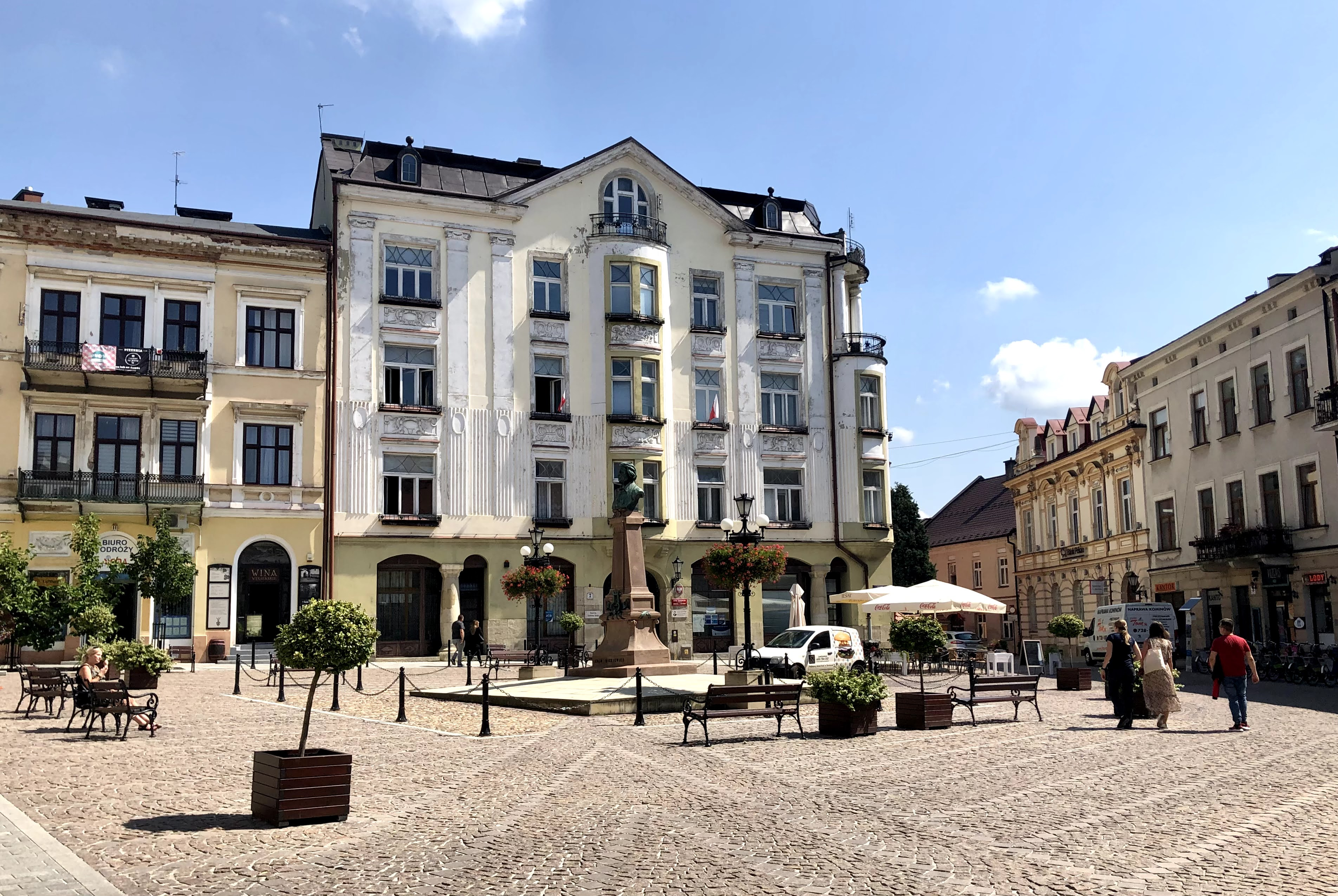
Casimir Square

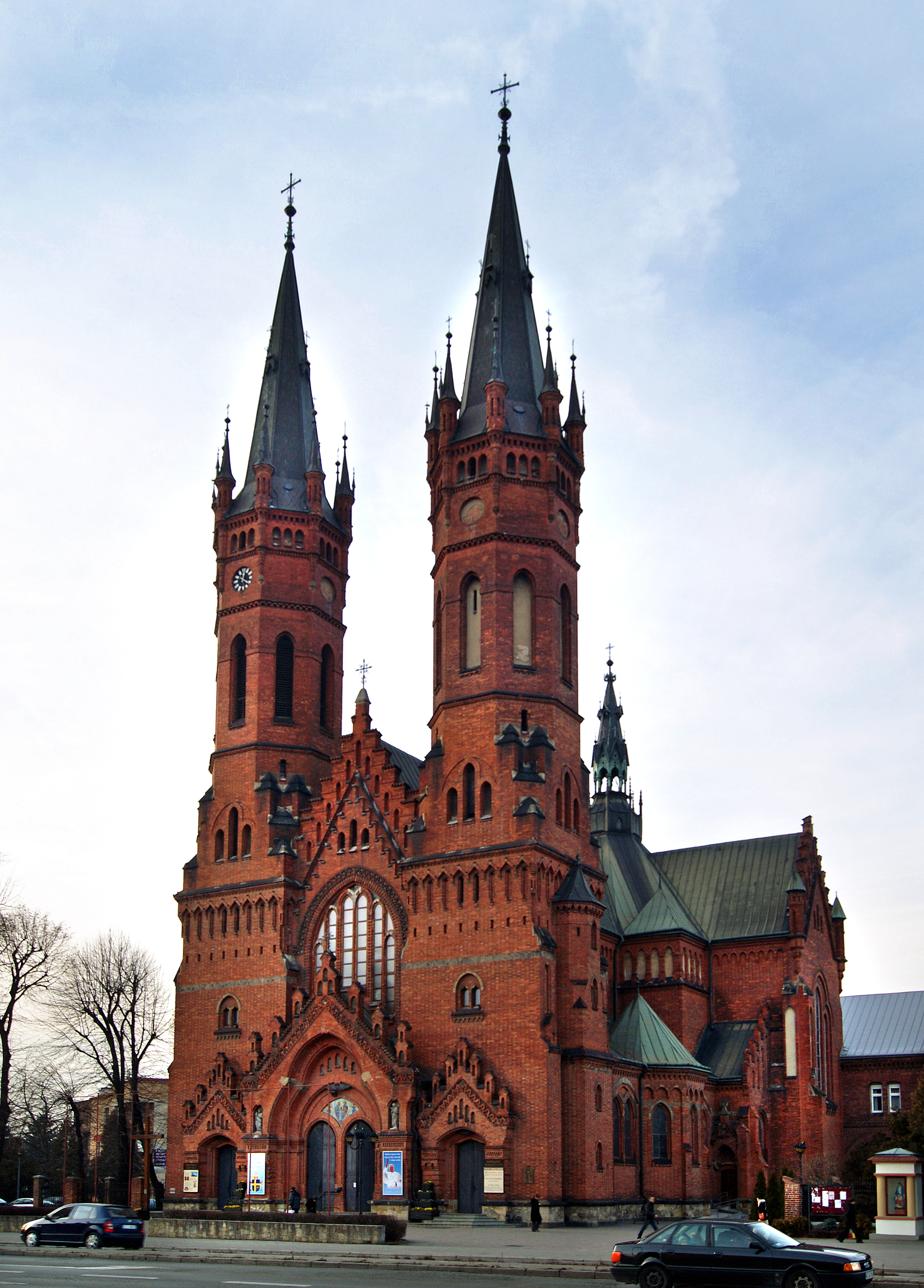
Gothic Revival Church of the Holy Family

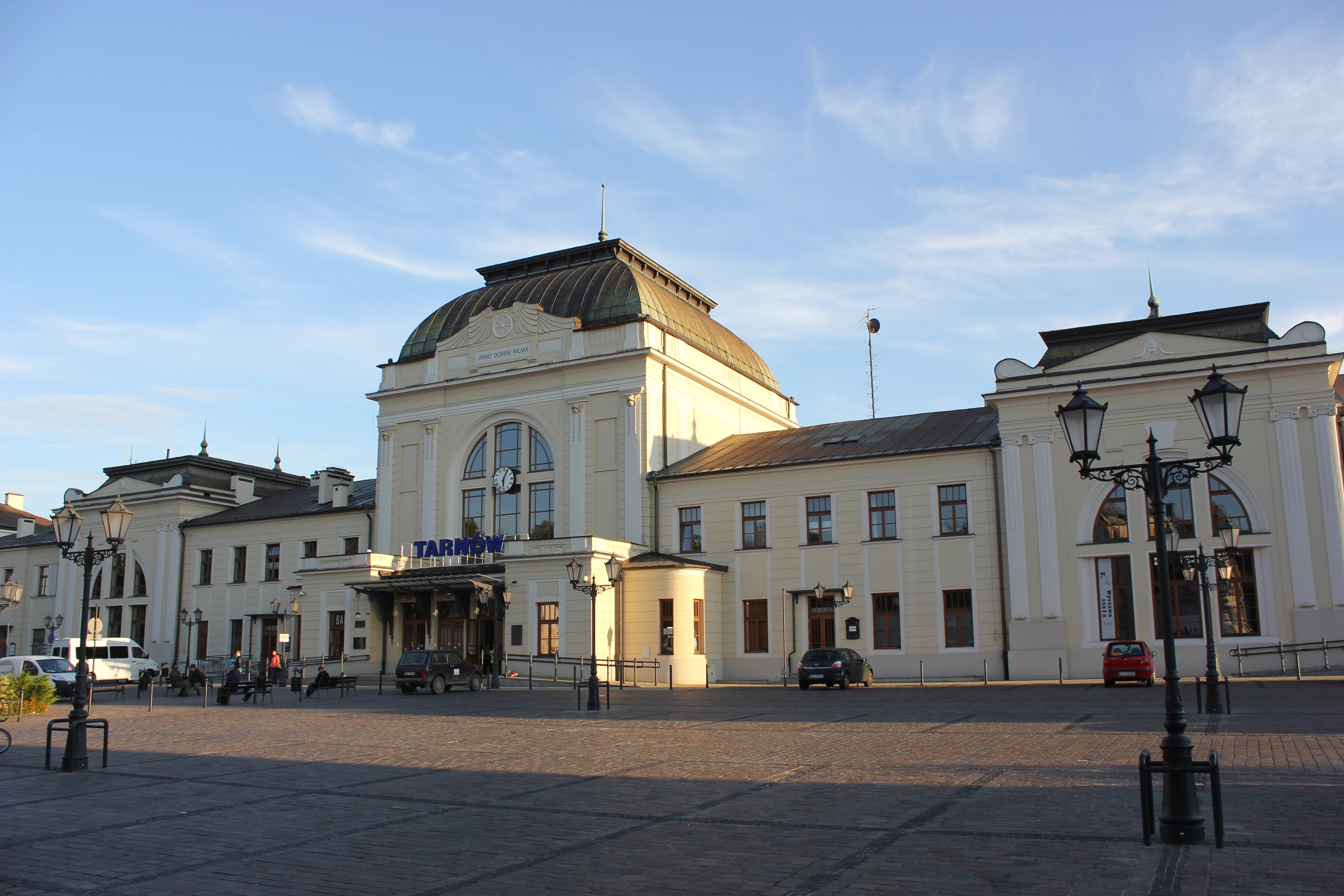
Railway station in Tarnów

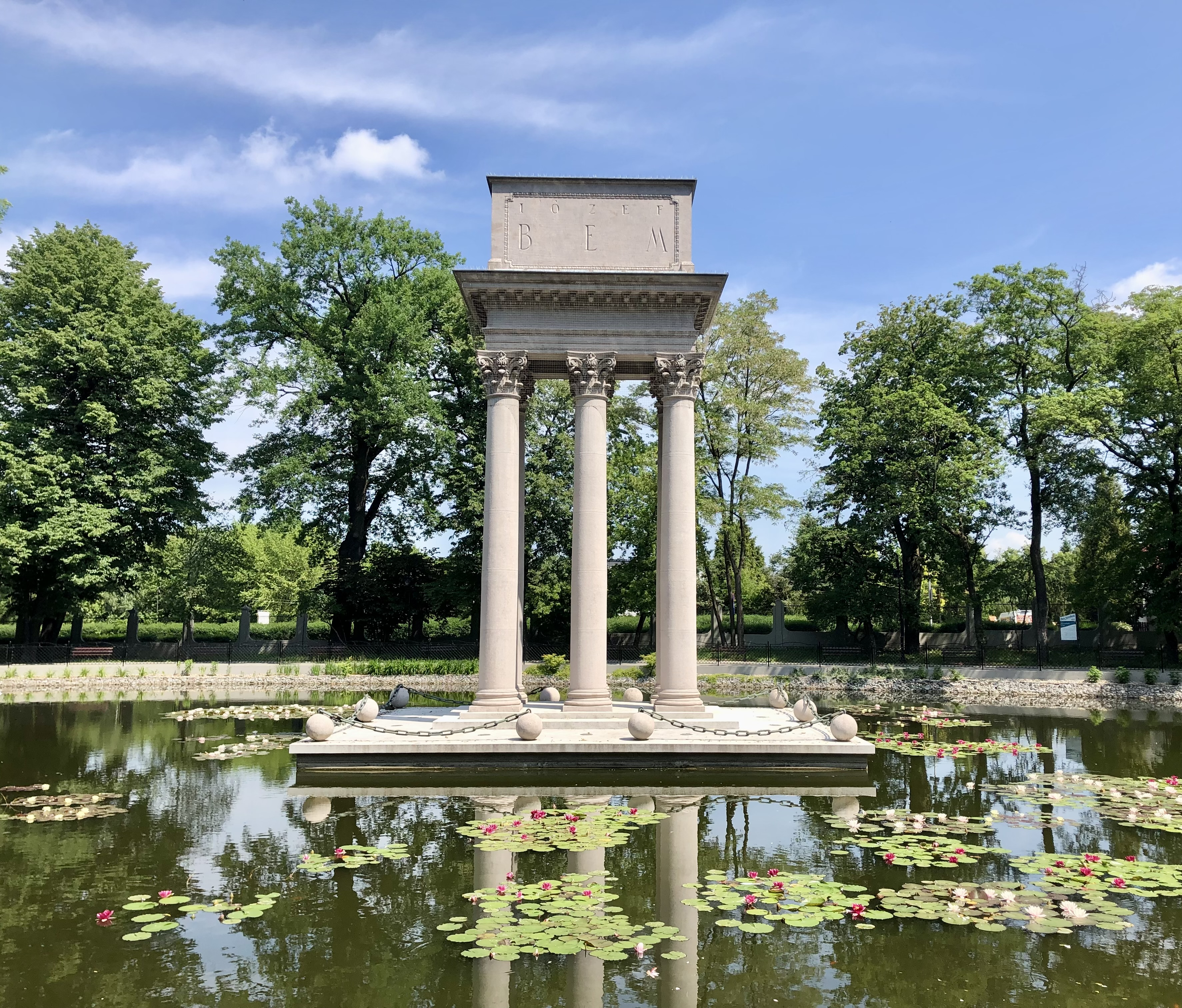
Tomb of General Józef Bem, national hero of Poland, Hungary and the former Ottoman Empire

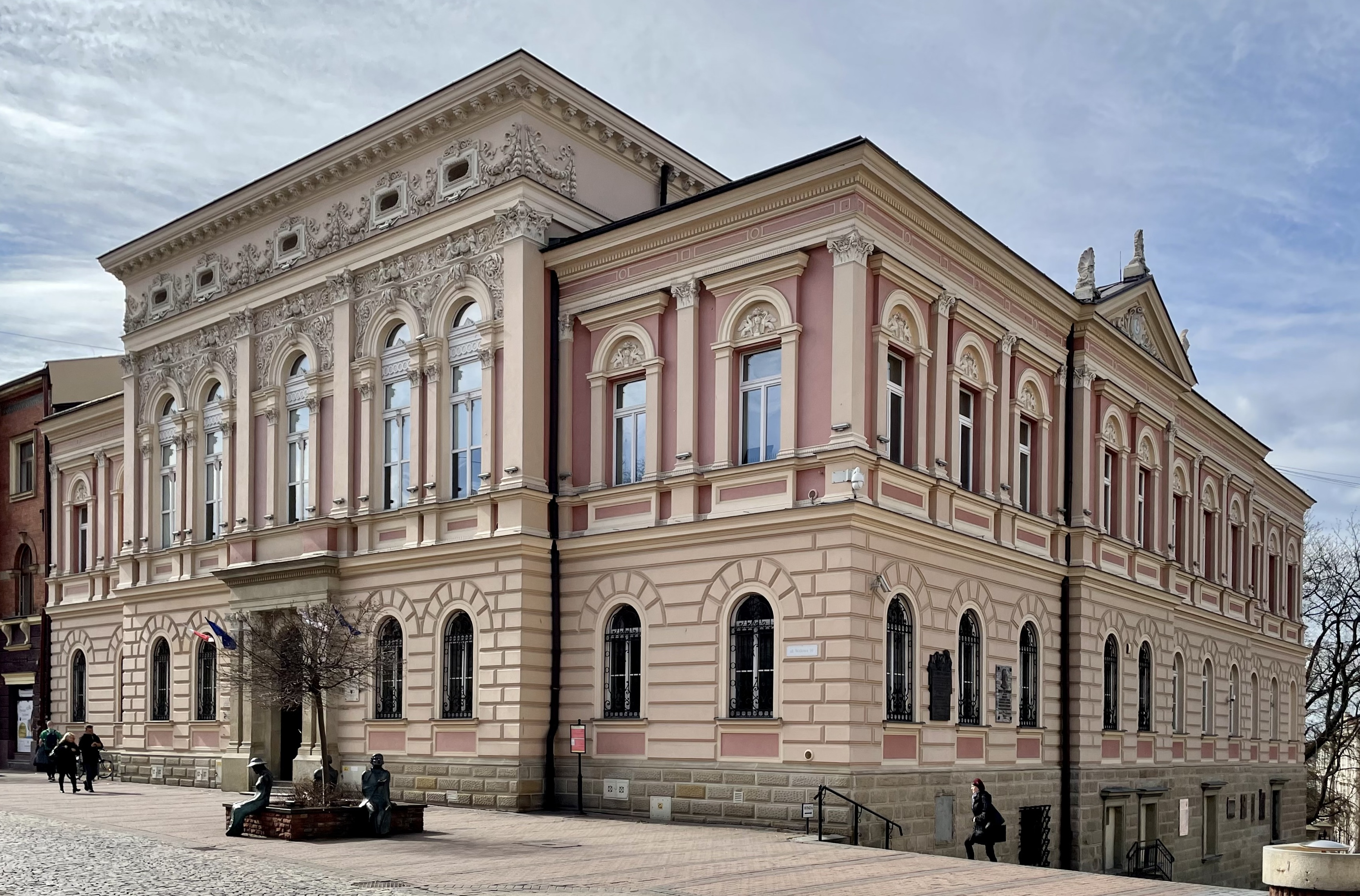
Historic building of the Municipal Savings Bank

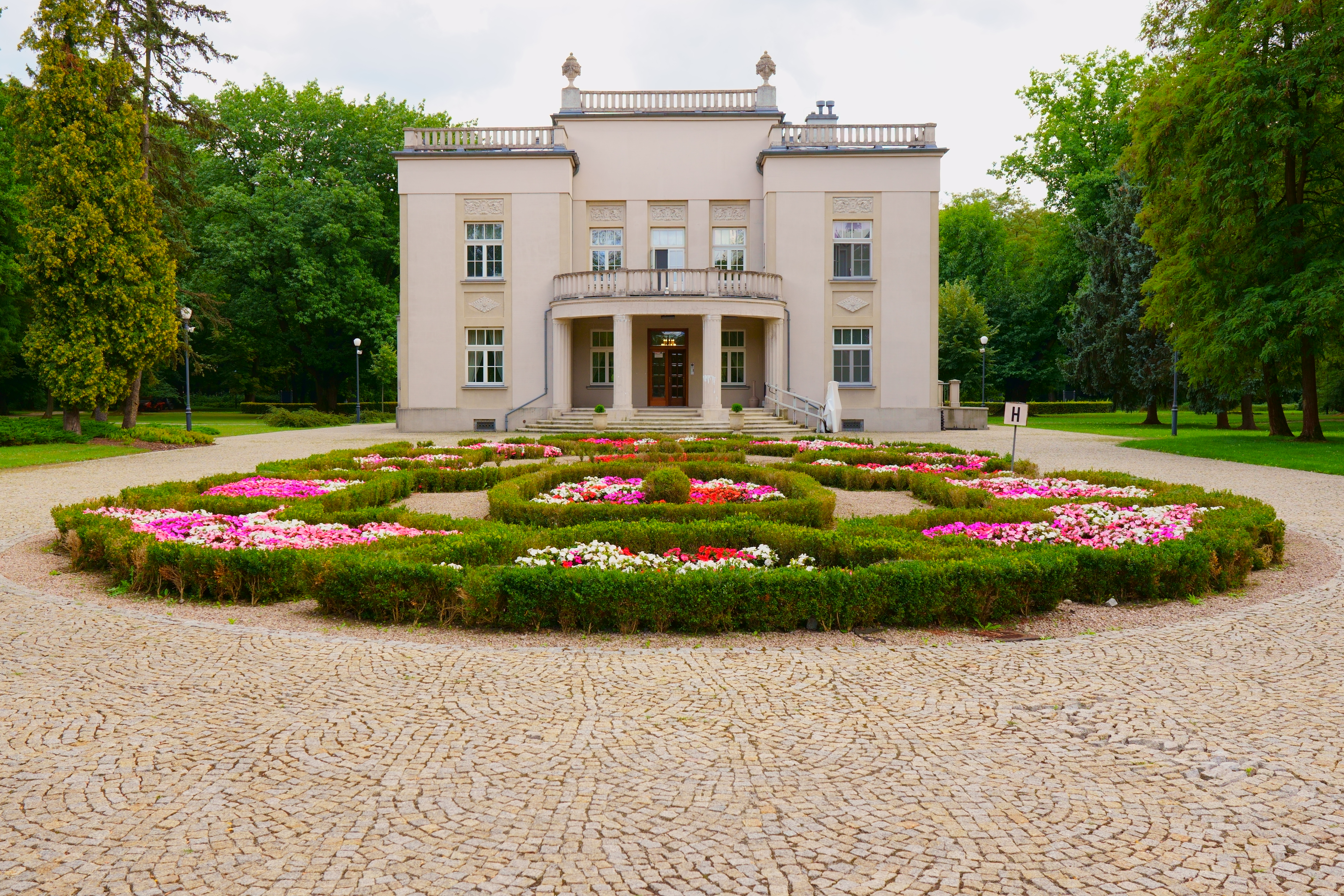
Eugeniusz Kwiatkowski villa in Mościce

== Education ==
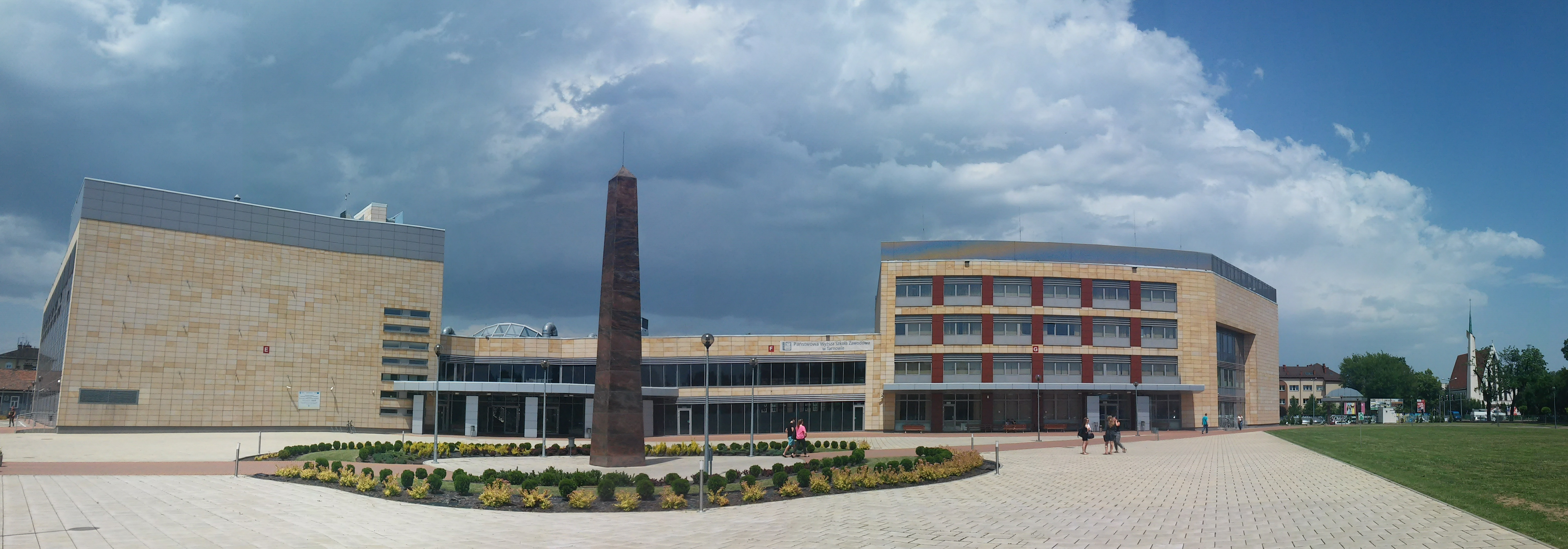
University of Applied Sciences in Tarnów

- University of Applied Sciences in Tarnów, UAS (Akademia Nauk Stosowanych w Tarnowie, ANS)
- Lesser Poland Higher School of Economics (Małopolska Wyższa Szkoła Ekonomiczna)
- Higher School of Business (Wyższa Szkoła biznesu)
- Higher Theological Seminary in Tarnów (Wyższe Seminarium Duchowne w Tarnowie, WSD)
- John Paul II High School in Tarnów (IV Liceum Ogólnokształcące im. Jana Pawła II w Tarnowie)

== Sports ==
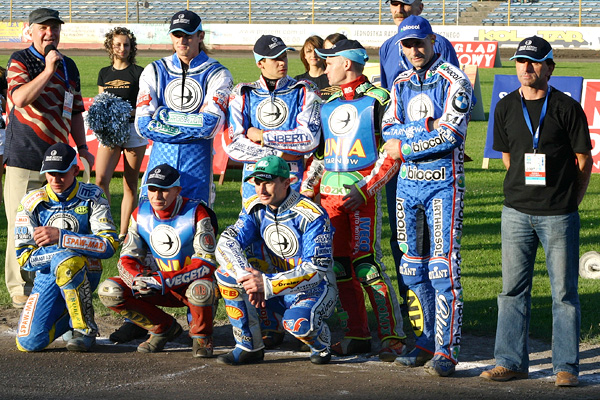
Unia Tarnów speedway team in 2007

The list features selected sport teams based in Tarnów:

- Unia Tarnów – speedway team, Polish Champions in 2004, 2005 and 2012. They race at the Jaskółcze Gniazdo Municipal Stadium and are sponsored by Mościce Nitrate Factory and is also popularly known as Jaskółki (Swallows).
- ZKS Unia Tarnów – Zakładowy Klub Sportowy Unia Tarnów (Workplace Sports Club United Tarnów) – association football team, which plays in the lower leagues
- Tarnovia Tarnów – association football team, which plays in the lower leagues, but played in Poland's top division in the past, most recently in 1948
- Unia Wisła Paged Tarnów – men's basketball team, which plays in the lower leagues, but played in Poland's top division in the past, most recently in 2007
- Grupa Azoty Unia Tarnów – men's handball team playing in the Polish Superliga
- Roleski Grupa Azoty PWSZ Tarnów – women's volleyball team playing in the TAURON Liga, the highest level of women's volleyball played in Poland

== Religion ==
Besides Catholics, other Christian denominations are also present in Tarnów including Baptist Church, Free Brothers Church, Jehovah's Witnesses, Methodist Church, Pentecostal Church, Seventh-day Adventist Church and the non-denominational Evangelical Movement "The Lord is my Banner". Before World War II there was a large population of Jews comprising half of the city's population, but now there remain just monuments of their past presence.

According to 2007 Catholic Church statistics provided by the Instytut Statystyki Kościoła Katolickiego SAC, Tarnów is the most religious city in Poland, with 72.5% of the congregation of the Diocese of Tarnów attending Mass.

== International relations ==
=== Twin towns – sister cities ===
Tarnów is twinned with:

- Trenčín in Slovakia
- Kiskőrös in Hungary
- Schoten in Belgium
- Blackburn in United Kingdom
- Casalmaggiore in Italy
- Veszprém in Hungary
- Nowy Sącz in Poland
- Bila Tserkva in Ukraine
- Vinnytsia in Ukraine
- Udine in Italy

Former twin towns:

- Ternopil in Ukraine

In June 2021, the Tarnów city council decided to suspend its partnership with the Ukrainian town of Ternopil as a reaction to the naming of a stadium in Ternopil in honour of Roman Shukhevych, one of the leaders of the Ukrainian Insurgent Army responsible for massacres of Poles in Volhynia and Eastern Galicia perpetrated between 1943–1945.

- Kotlas in Russia

In March 2022, the Tarnów city council decided to suspend its partnership with the Russian town of Kotlas.

== Notable people ==
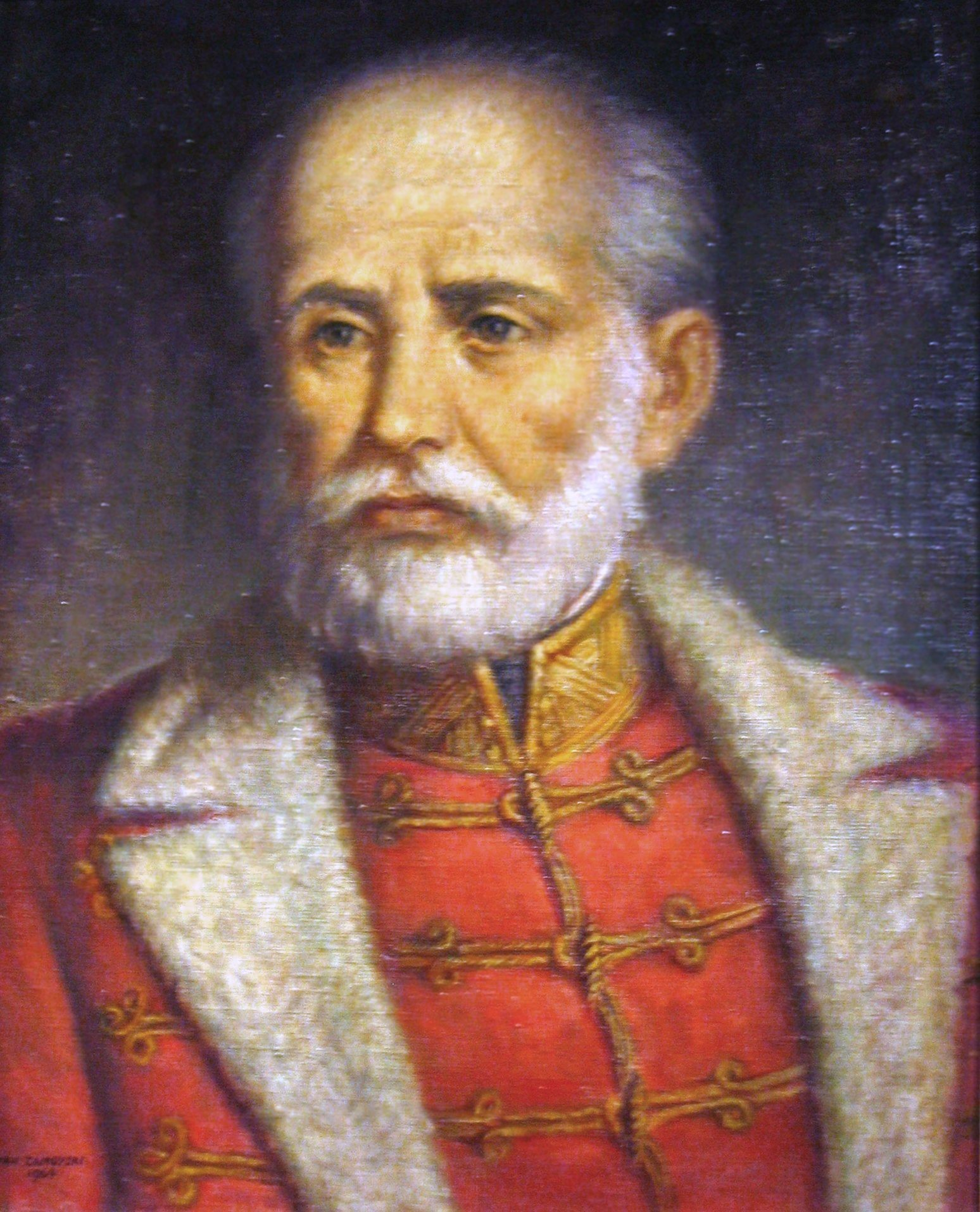
Józef Bem

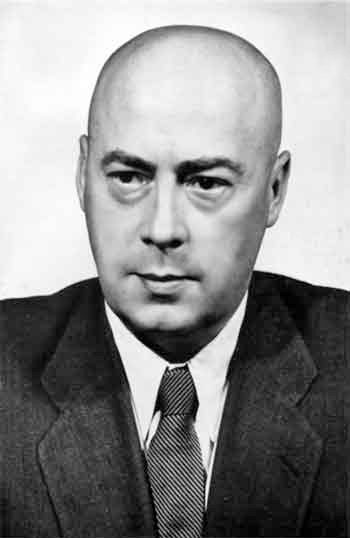
Józef Cyrankiewicz

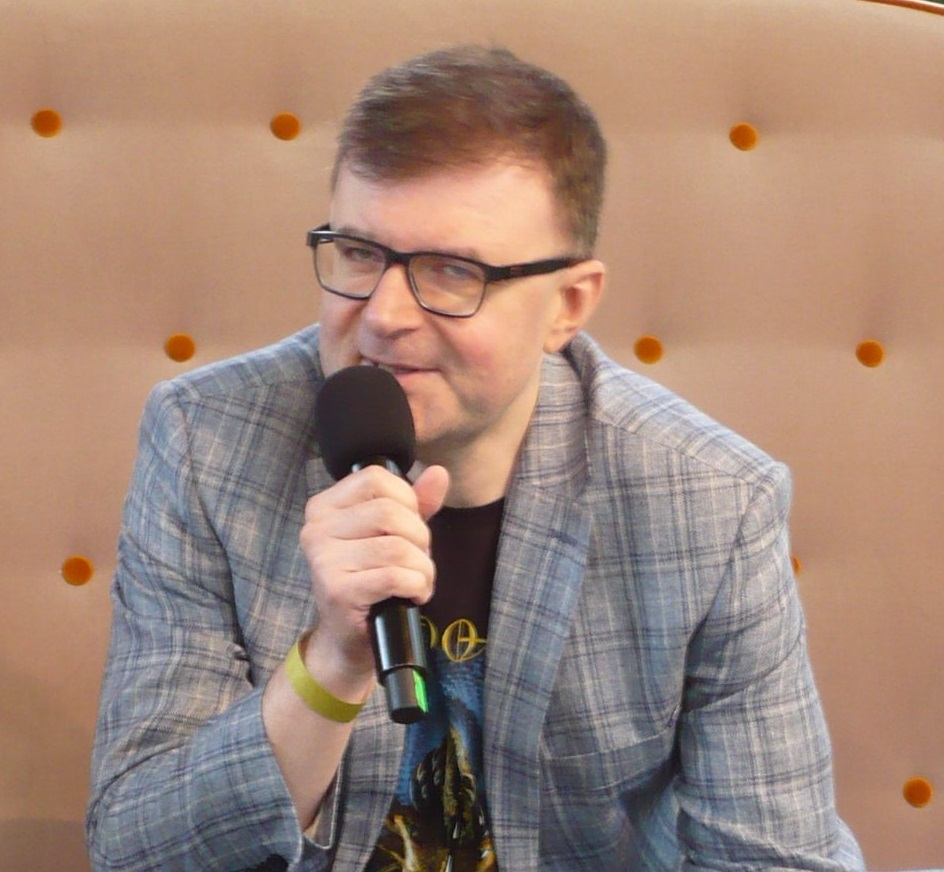
Jacek Dukaj

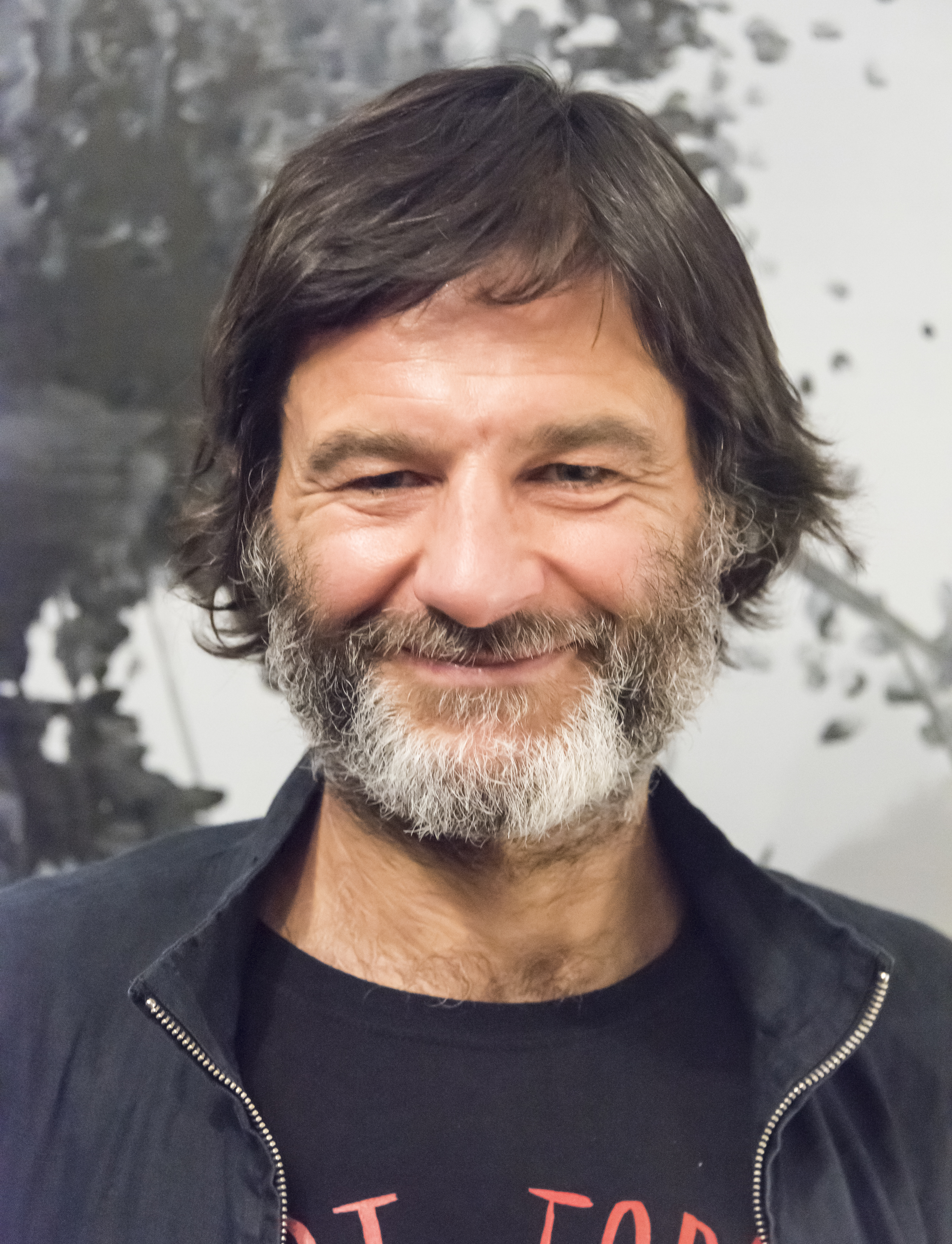
Wilhelm Sasnal

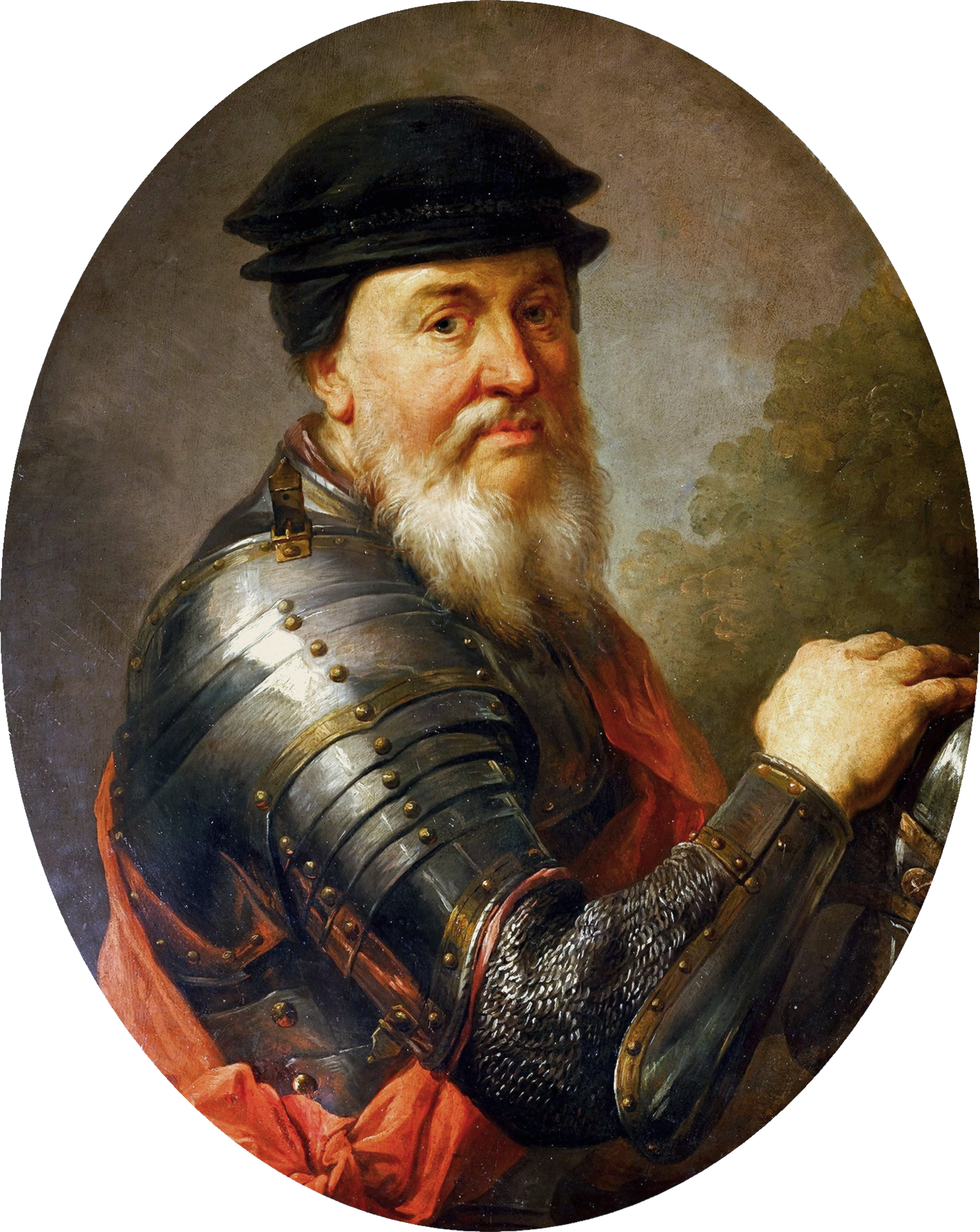
Jan Amor Tarnowski

- Józef Bem (1794–1850), Polish engineer, general and Ottoman pasha
- Stella Bloch (1897–1999), American artist, dancer and journalist
- Roman Brandstaetter (1906–1987), writer
- Marian Curyło (born 1955), politician and businessman
- Józef Cyrankiewicz (1911–1989), communist politician, prime minister of Poland
- Charles Denner (1926–1995), French actor
- Jan Drohojowski (1901–1979), diplomat
- Jacek Dukaj (born 1974), writer
- Stefan Filipkiewicz (1879–1944), painter
- Ignace J(ay). Gelb (1907–1985), Polish-American ancient historian, Assyriologist
- Adam Gorczyński (1805–1876), poet, writer and painter
- Allan Gray (born Josef Żmigród, 1902–1973), composer
- Michał Heller (born 1936), philosopher
- Marcin Hycnar (born 1983), actor
- Natalia Kałucka (born 2001), competition climber
- Bartosz Kapustka (born 1996), footballer
- Naphtali Keller (1834–1865), Jewish scholar; son of Israel Mendel Keller
- Mateusz Klich (born 1990), footballer
- Tadeusz Klimecki (1895–1943), chief of Polish General Staff
- Agnieszka Kłopotek (born 1969), Polish politician and zootechnician
- Renata Knapik-Miazga (born 1988), épée fencer
- José Krakover (1883–1957), Argentinian Jewish photographer
- Andrzej Krasicki (1918–1995), film and theatre actor and theatre director
- Krystyna Kuperberg (born 1944), mathematician
- Felicia Langer (1930–2018), attorney and human rights activist
- Franciszek Latinik (1864–1949), military officer
- Siegfried Lipiner (1856–1911), Galician-Austrian Jewish poet
- Andrew Odlyzko (born 1949), mathematician
- Anny Ondra (1903–1987), Czech film actress
- Stanisław Opałko (1911–1993), industrialist and politician
- Ksawery Masiuk (born 2004), swimmer
- Lidia Morawska (born 1952), physicist
- Agata Mróz-Olszewska (1982–2008), volleyball player and two-time European Champion
- Luke Nosek (born 1975), Polish-American entrepreneur, co-founder of PayPal
- Tony Rickardsson (born 1970), motorcycle speedway rider, honorable resident since 2006
- Ignacy Schiper (1884–1943), Jewish historian and politician
- Eustachy Stanisław Sanguszko (1842–1903), nobleman, conservative politician
- Wilhelm Sasnal (born 1972), painter
- Jan Szczepanik (1872–1926), inventor
- Jan Tarnowski (1488–1561), nobleman and Hetman
- Jan of Tarnów (c. 1349–1409), nobleman
- Jan of Tarnów (1367–1433), nobleman
- Rafał z Tarnowa (c. 1330–1373), nobleman
- Zofia Vetulani (1893–1981), civil servant, social and political activist
- Rabbi Marcus Weissmann-Chajes (1830–1914), Jewish scholar
- Rabbi Salo Wittmayer Baron (1895–1989), Jewish historian
- Jan Wojnarski (1879–1937), painter and graphic artist
- Marcin Wrona (1973–2015), film director
- Franciszek Zachara (1898–1966), composer and pianist
- Maciej Zembaty (1944–2011), artist and comedian

== See also ==
- Lesser Poland
- List of cities and towns in Poland
- Akademiola (Tarnów)
- Tarnów city walls

== Note ==
- This article incorporates text from the United States Holocaust Memorial Museum, and has been released under the GFDL as "Tarnow".^{OTRS ticket number.}
