= Bikkurim (periodical) =

Bikkurim (Hebrew: בכורים, lit. 'First-Fruits') was a Hebrew annual periodical that appeared in Vienna in 1864–1865, edited and published by Naphtali Keller. The publication attracted some of the greatest Hebrew scholars of the era as contributors, including Weiss, Jellinek, Reifmann, Lewisohn, Gottlober, Friedmann, and Letteris.

Keller died before he could finalize the second volume for publication. Jellinek and Meyer Friedmann took up the work of arranging all the material Keller had amassed, and with the publication of this volume the issue was discontinued.

The two published volumes primarily focused on matters related to Jewish scholarship, history, and literature, and contained little poetry and fiction.
