= Marcus Weissmann-Chajes =

Galician Jewish writer

- Born: January 17, 1831; Tarnów, Austrian Galicia
- Died: April 30, 1914 (aged 83); Vienna, Austria-Hungary
- Writing career
- Pen name: MV"Ḥ (מו״ח)
- Language: Hebrew
- Literary movement: Haskalah

Marcus Weissmann-Chajes (Hebrew: מרדכי ווייסמאן־חיות, romanized: Mordekhay Vaysman-Ḥayot; January 17, 1831 – April 30, 1914) also known by the Hebrew acronym MV"Ḥ (מו״ח), was a Galician Jewish writer.

== Biography ==
Marcus Weissmann-Chajes was born in Tarnów in 1830, the son of Yitzḥak Leib. He was destined for a rabbinical career, and began at a young age to receive instruction in the Talmud and in rabbinics. Among his tutors were Israel Katz Rapoport, then av beit din of Tarnów. When only ten years of age he began writing Hebrew poetry, and five years later he wrote his Mappalat ha-mitkashsherim, a metrical composition on the failure of the Polish revolt. Part of this work appeared in the Maggid Mishneh (1872) under the title Aḥarit mered.

In 1872 he founded in Lemberg the Maggid Mishneh, a semimonthly periodical devoted to Jewish history and to Hebrew literature; of this publication, however, only four numbers appeared. In the following year he settled in Vienna, where he edited the thirty-seventh number of Kokheve Yitzḥak. During the years 1874 to 1876 he edited the Wiener Jüdische Zeitung, a Yiddish weekly.

== Publications ==
- Mashal u-melitzah (in Hebrew). Tarnów: Druck von A. Rusinowski. 1860–1864. An alphabetically arranged collection of Talmudic proverbs rendered into metrical rimes.
- Alon bakut (in Hebrew). Lemberg: J. M. Stand. 1863. Elegies on the deaths of Mordecai Zeeb Ettinger and Jacob Gutwirth.
- Mar'eh makom ve-haggahot (in Hebrew). Krotoschin. 1866. Index and glosses to the Jerusalem Talmud, appended to the Krotoschin edition.
- Magid Mishnah (in Hebrew). Lemberg. 1872.
- Kokhve Yitzḥak (in Hebrew). Vienna. 1873. Collection of literary-historical, philological and poetic essays promoting study of the Hebrew language.
- Ḥokhmah u-musar (in Hebrew). Vienna: Druck von Moritz Knöpfelmacher. 1882. Parables and legends rendered into metrical verse.
- Ḥatan Bereshit ve-ḥatan Torah (in Hebrew). Vienna: Druck von Moritz Knöpfelmacher. 1883. The 613 commandments derived by means of notarikon from "bereshit."
- Mille di-bediḥuta (in Hebrew). Vienna. 1884. Epigrams and humorous sayings in verse.
- "Seliḥah le-Shonerer". Ha-Maggid (in Hebrew). 32 (21). 1888. Polemic against Georg Ritter von Schönerer.
- Divre ḥakhamim ve-ḥidotam (in Hebrew). Vol. 1. Vienna: Druck von Moritz Knöpfelmacher. 1892. Second edition of the Mashal u-melitzah, in which the Talmudic proverbs are supplied with rimed explanations.
- Osem bosem (in Hebrew). Vienna: Verlag von Jos. Schlesinger's Buchhandlung. 1913.
