= Saint Martin's Peak =

Hill near Tarnów, Poland

- Polish: Góra Świętego Marcina
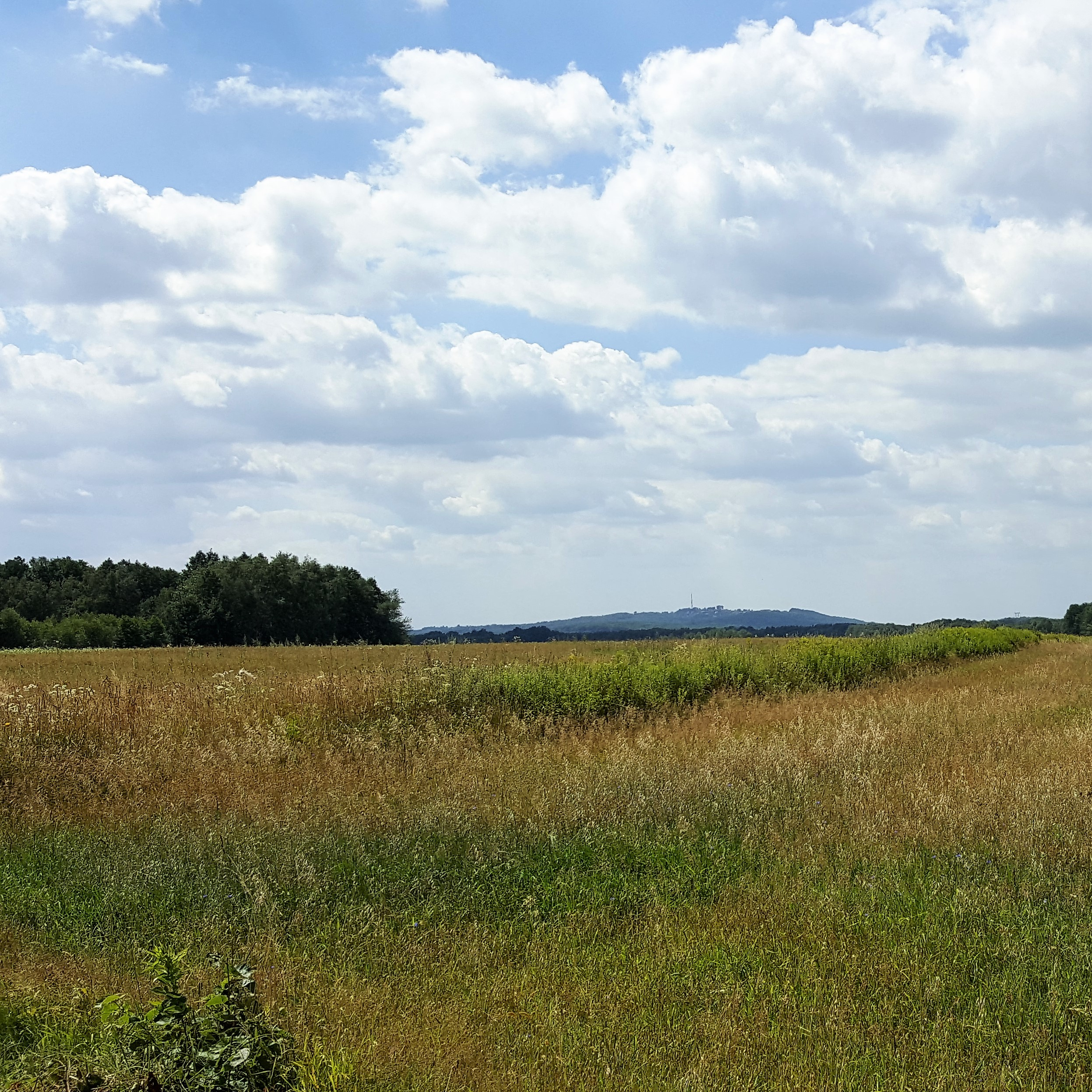

Highest point
- Elevation: 384 m (1,260 ft)
- Coordinates: 49°59′23″N 21°00′20″E

Geography
- Location within Poland
- Parent range: Carpathian foothills

Saint Martin's Peak (Polish: Góra Świętego Marcina) (384 m above sea level) is a hill located southeast of the center of Tarnów, Poland, partly inside the city's administrative boundaries. It forms the northern edge of the threshold of the Carpathian foothills.

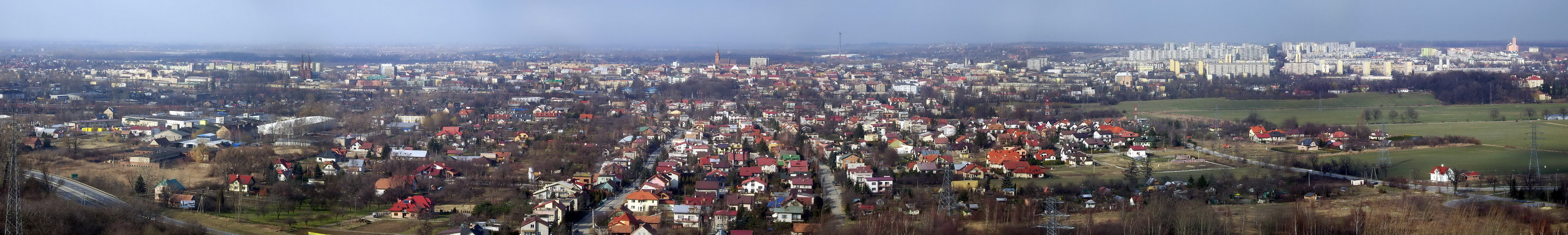
Panorama of Tarnów viewed from Saint Martin's Peak
