= Akademiola (Tarnów) =

Historic building in Tarnów, Poland

Akademiola in Tarnów
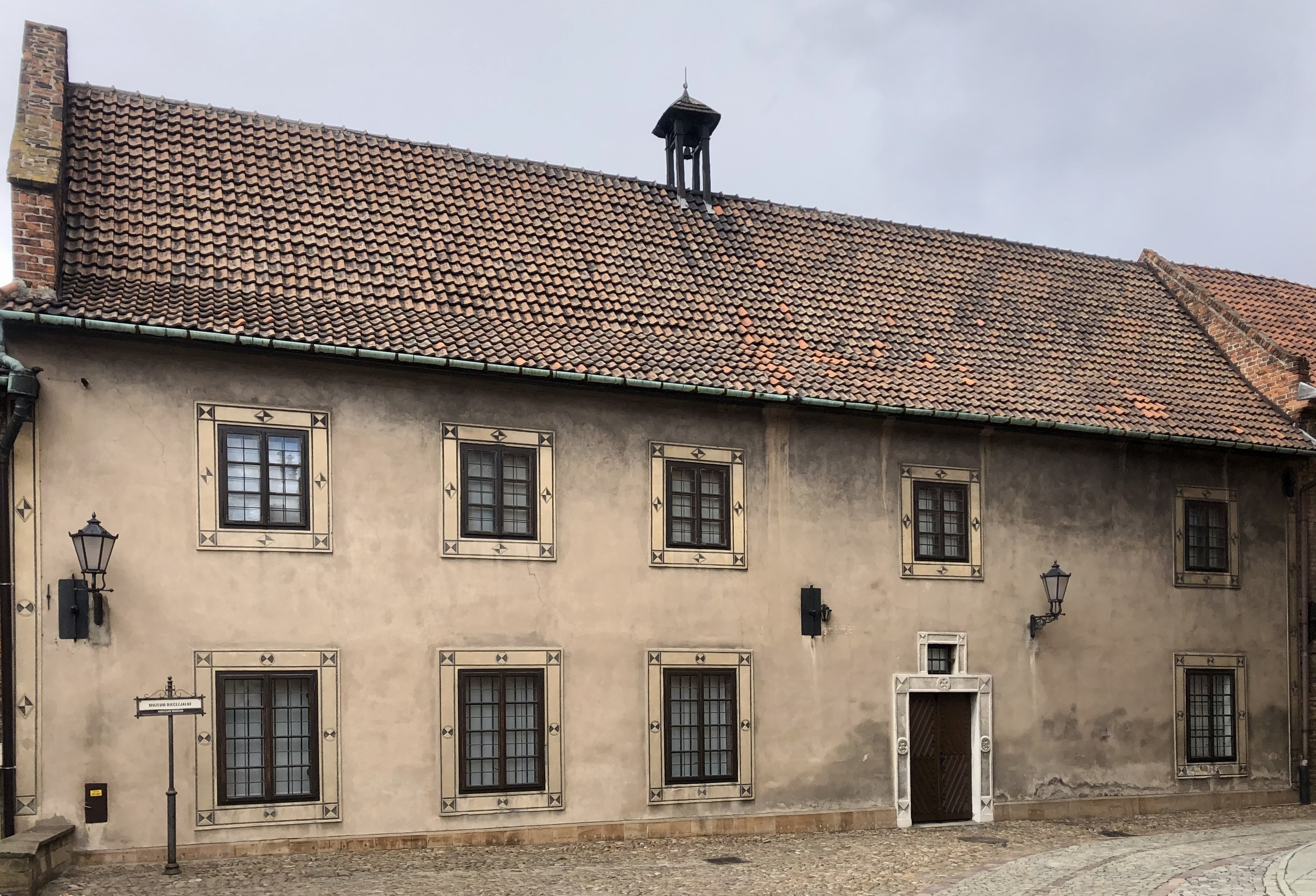
- View of the front elevation of the building
- Interactive map of the Akademiola in Tarnów area
- Alternative names: Scholasteria; Chapter House

General information
- Type: tenement
- Architectural style: Renaissance
- Location: 5 Cathedral Square, Tarnów, Poland
- Coordinates: 50°00′47″N 20°59′12″E
- Completed: 16th century
- Renovated: 18th century, 19th century, 1940s–1950s
- Owner: Diocesan Curia in Tarnów

Technical details
- Floor count: 2
- Grounds: 150 m^{2}

Akademiola in Tarnów (also known as scholasteria or chapter house) is a historic building located at 5 Cathedral Square in Tarnów. It was likely created by merging two other structures: the parish school building and the infirmary for collegiate vicars, built around the mid-16th century. Over its history, it was used, among other purposes, as the seat of educational institutions. Today, it is utilized by the Tarnów Diocesan Museum.

== Location ==
The building known as the akademiola, scholasteria, or chapter house is situated in Tarnów's Old Town, at 5 Cathedral Square. It is part of the compact western frontage of the square, with its front wall facing approximately east. To the south, it adjoins the Scholasteria (also referred to as the rector's or chapter's house), and to the north, the Mikołajowski House.

== History ==
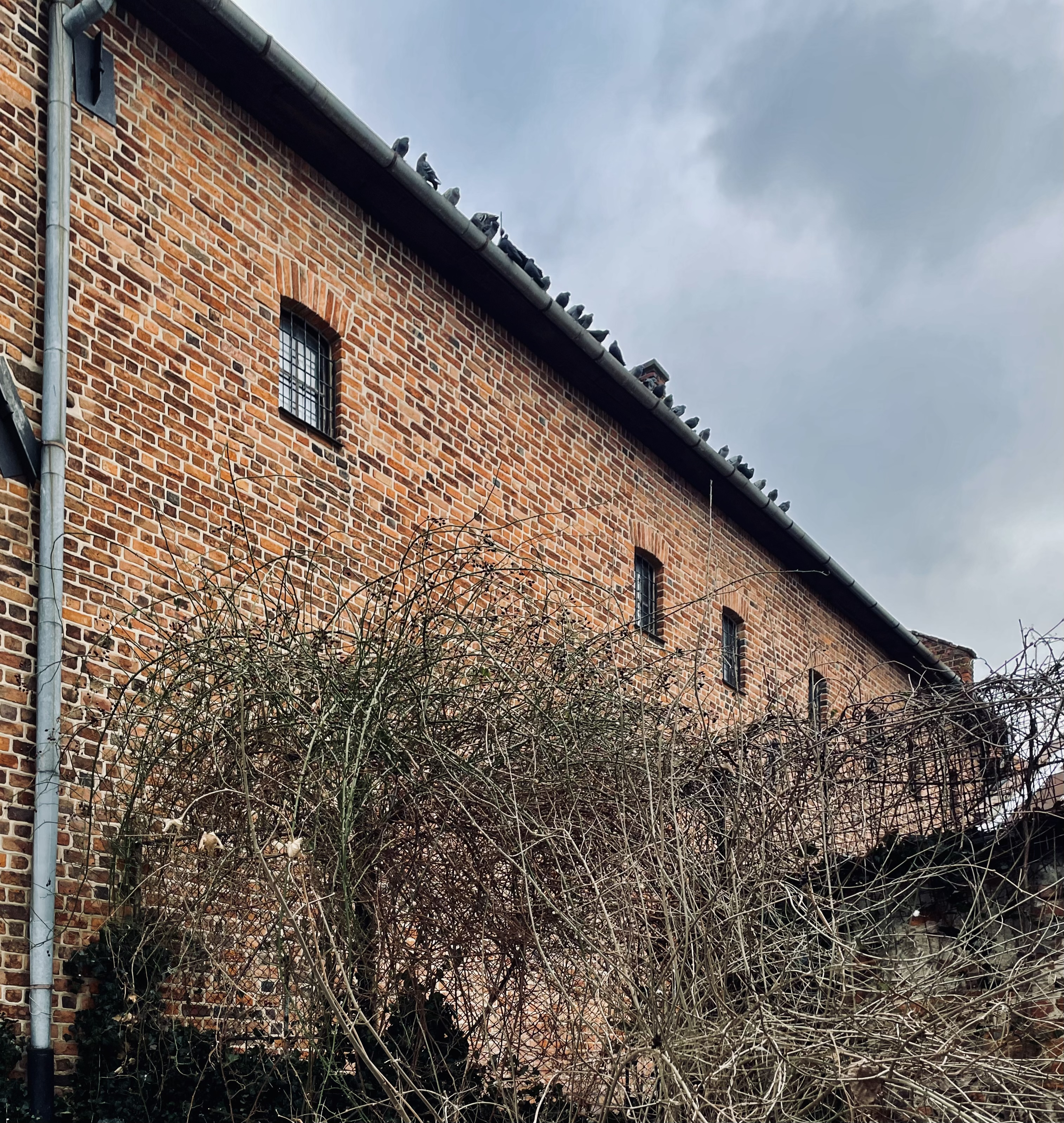
Rear elevation of the building

The exact date of construction of the building is unknown. It was likely formed as a result of merging two previously existing structures: the infirmary for collegiate vicars and the parish school.

=== Parish school building ===
The parish school building is thought to have been constructed in the 16th century, although its precise construction date remains unclear. It was likely built at the initiative of Marcin Łyczka, the provost of Tarnów, who made a foundation for the school in 1578. However, the foundation document does not mention the school building, suggesting it might have existed earlier, and no reconstruction was necessary.

It is believed that the building was constructed between 1552 and 1559, during the time Marcin Łyczka assumed the role of provost and the issuance of a fee tail by Jan Tarnowski for the school, which probably concluded its transformation and may have included the construction of a new brick building. This assumption is supported by a 1559 permit from Hetman Jan Tarnowski allowing for the construction of another brick building, suggesting that the neighboring school was also made of brick.

The existence of a small two-story brick school building was recorded in 1597 during a visitation by Cardinal Jerzy Radziwiłł. The structure was described as consisting of four rooms, including the rector's and cantor's residences, a hall for the students, and a schoolroom.

Since 1645, the school building had been annually maintained by the Tarnów Chapter, which allocated 4 grzywna for this purpose, previously paid to the rector by the town. In 1663, the building was significantly damaged by a city fire. Following this, the town council, unable to secure enough funds for repairs, transferred the building to the Tarnów Chapter in 1694.

=== Infirmary building ===
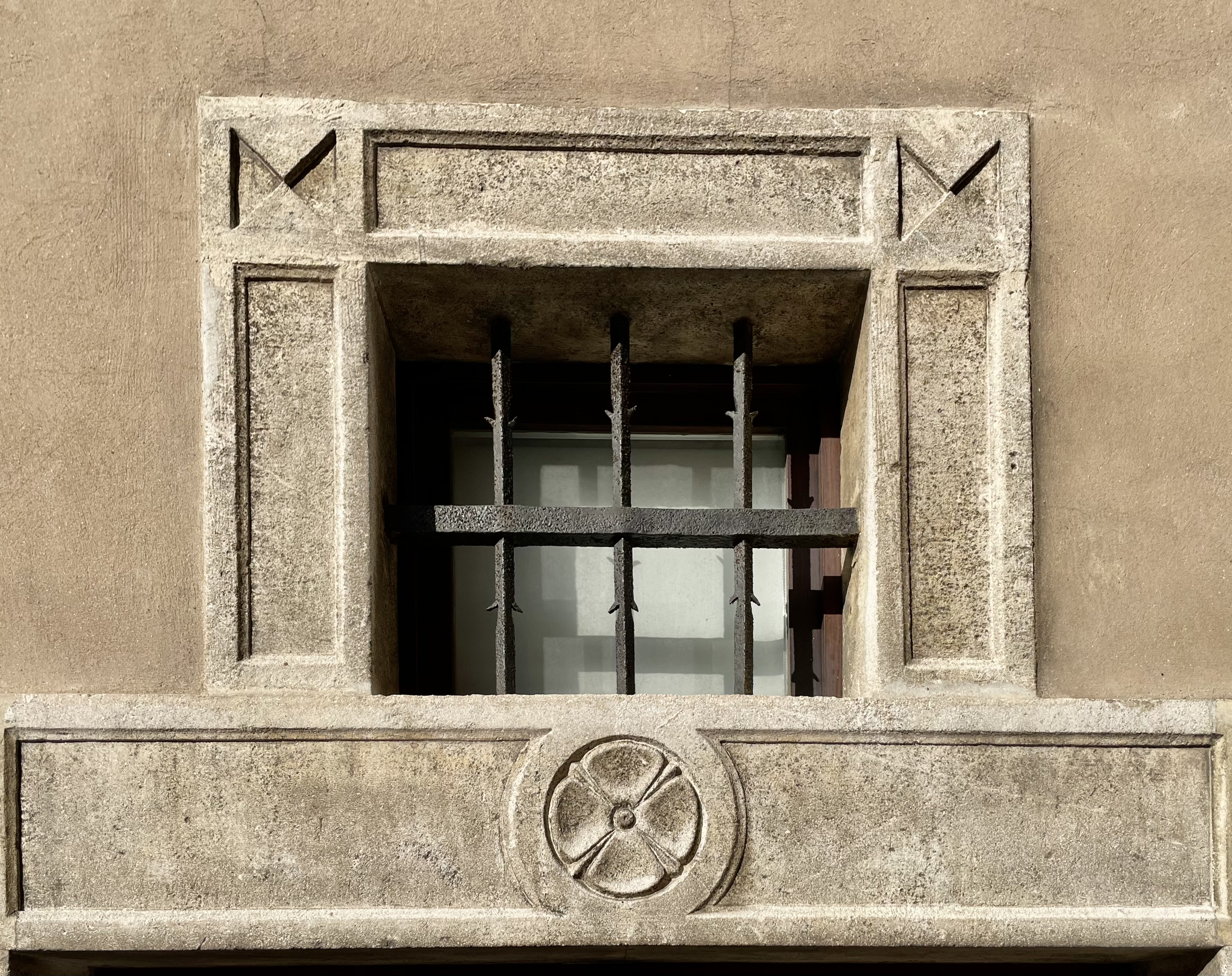
Transom above the main portal of the building, visible detail of the portal decoration

The infirmary building was constructed following a planning permission issued in 1559 by Hetman Jan Tarnowski for the custodian of Tarnów, Jan. This document included stipulations stating that the building should be made available for military purposes if the city needed to be defended, and that upon the death of the custodian, the property would pass into the hands of the vicars.

The building was likely constructed on the entire available plot of land between the school building and the Mikołajowski House, shortly after the permit was issued. Before the end of the 16th century, in accordance with a previously made agreement, it became the property of the vicars, after which it was adapted for use as an infirmary.

The infirmary was destroyed in the 1617 city fire, but the following year, the vicars, with the support of Canon Maciej Kunowicz, rebuilt it.

In 1663, the infirmary building was purchased for 600 PLN by Canon Paweł Kuszewski, the founder of the new St. Charles Borromeo canonry. The building was to serve him and his successors. In 1668, he transferred part of the building to the use of the provost, who also occupied rooms in the neighboring Mikołajowski House.

=== Period from the 18th century ===
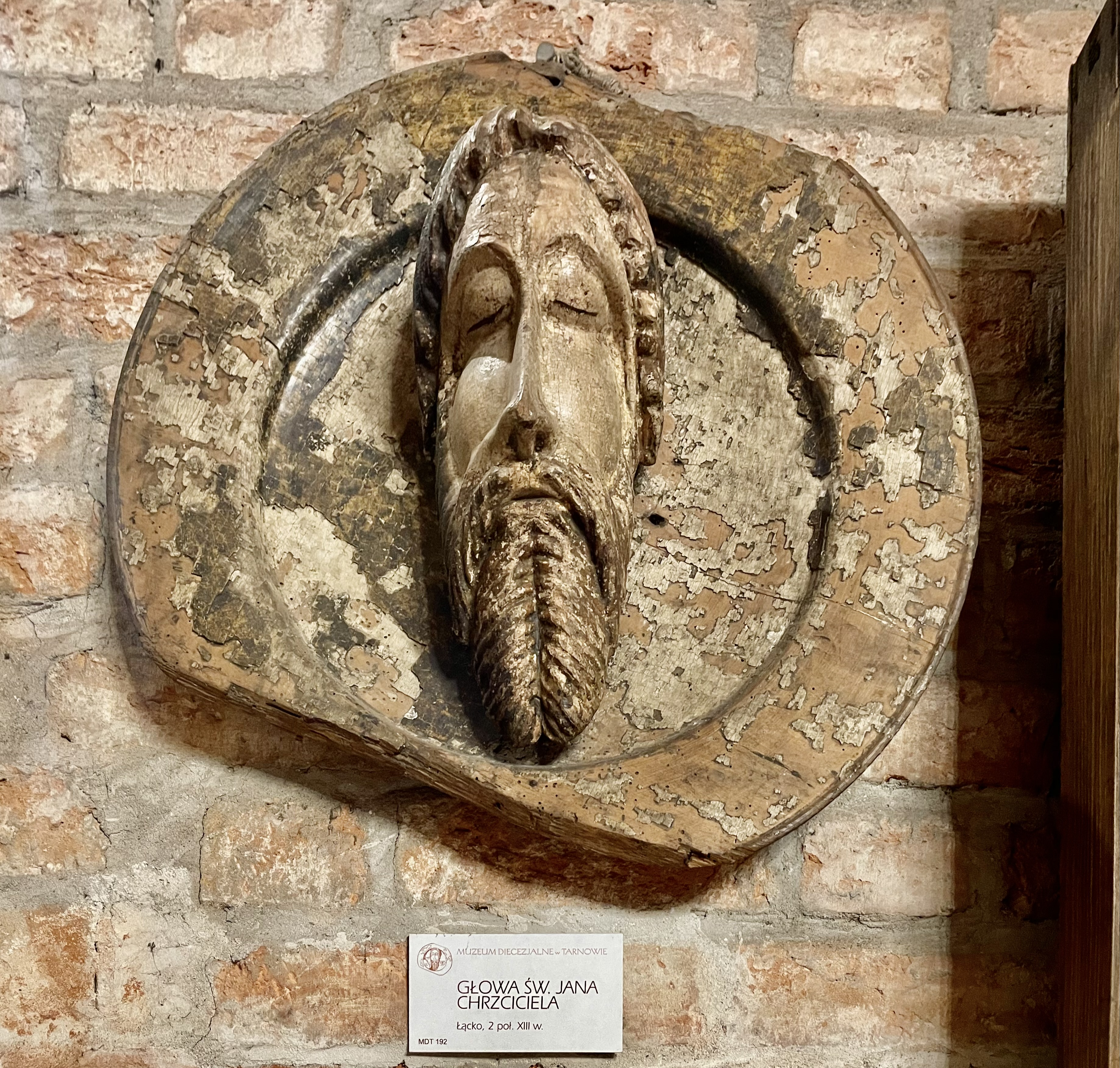
Sculpture of the head of St. John the Baptist on a basin from the 13th century, one of the exhibits displayed in the Akademiola

At the beginning of the 18th century, both buildings were in poor technical condition, and according to a 1753 report, they required immediate revitalization. At that time, the infirmary building also became part of the scholasteria's assets and was owned by the scholaster.

After the establishment of a small academy (academic colony) through the foundation of Wojciech Kaszewicz, called Akademiola, both buildings were transferred to its ownership. Between 1753 and 1756, renovation and adaptation works were organized, with 1,000 PLN allocated for the task. As part of these efforts, it is presumed that the interiors of both buildings were connected, leaving one common entrance. However, it seems that not all elements of the connected buildings were addressed, as in 1766, the roof still required repairs.

After the adaptation for educational purposes, the former infirmary rooms were designated as apartments for professors, while the former school building housed classrooms for rhetoric and poetics (on the upper floor), as well as a large general learning hall (on the ground floor).

Following the First Partition of Poland, Tarnów was occupied by the Habsburg monarchy. According to Austrian authorities, the academic colony was initially placed under the supervision of the chapter and was subsequently dissolved in 1784, with a state-run Austrian gymnasium established in its place. Despite one part of the building, the former infirmary, being church property, it was not seized for the Austrian Religious Fund.

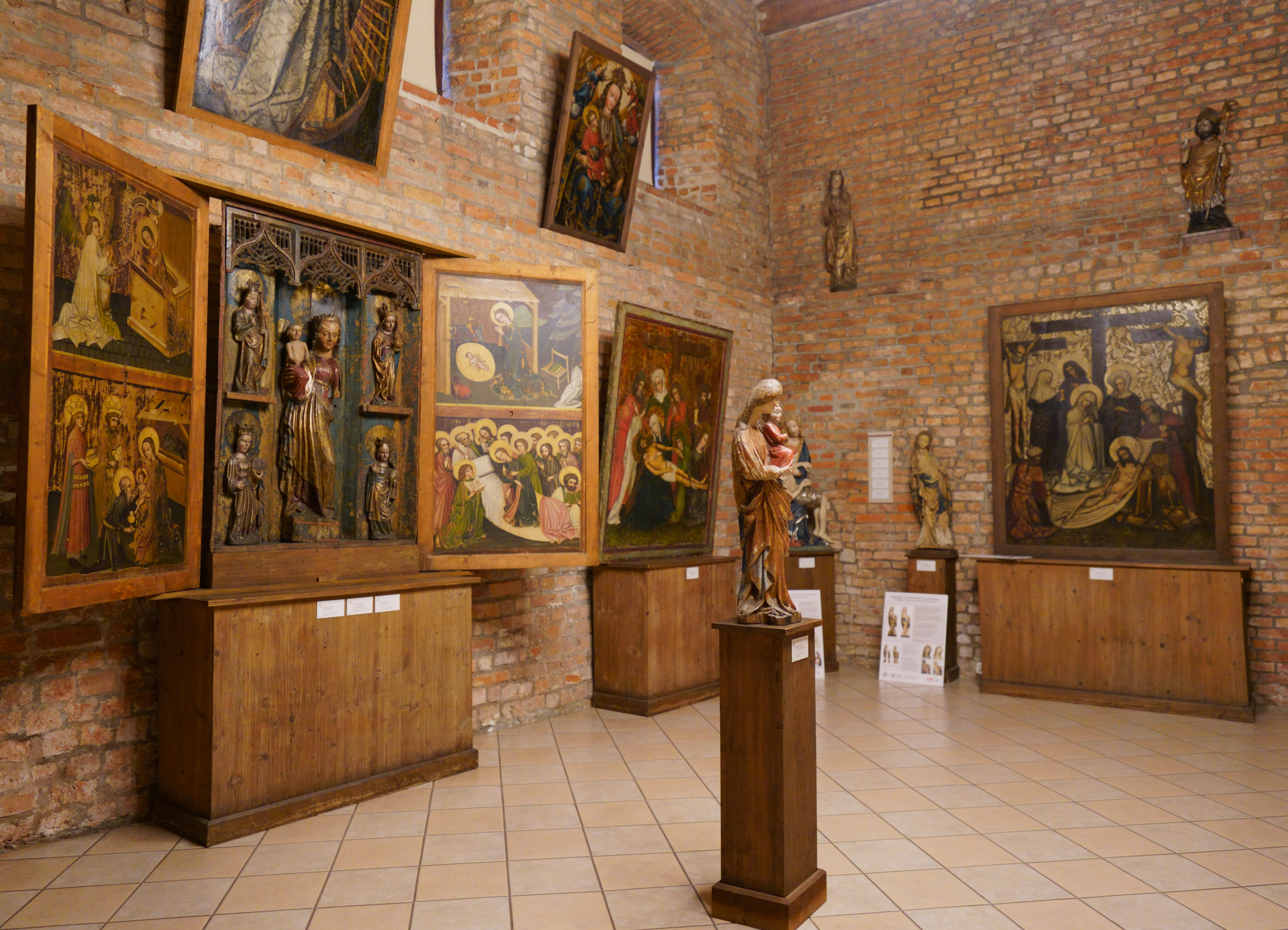
One of the exhibition rooms in the Akademiola

In 1810 or between 1814 and 1817, at the request of the gymnasium director, the building was extensively reconstructed, including connecting it by demolishing parts of the walls with the neighboring Mikołajowski House. Both buildings were also covered with a shared roof.

Throughout the 19th century, the building functioned as an educational facility. Until 1849, it housed rooms for the gymnasium. Between 1880 and 1896, it was used by the district school, and from 1896 to 1903, it served as the seat of the girls' secondary school. The building ceased to function as a school due to its deteriorating technical condition, which the municipal authorities described as a ruin. Although a full reconstruction was planned at the time, the idea was ultimately abandoned.

In 1938, the building was purchased by the Tarnów diocesan curia at the decision of Bishop Franciszek Lisowski. During the German occupation in World War II, the curia decided to secure the building from further damage, and in 1944, it was designated to house the Tarnów Diocesan Museum.

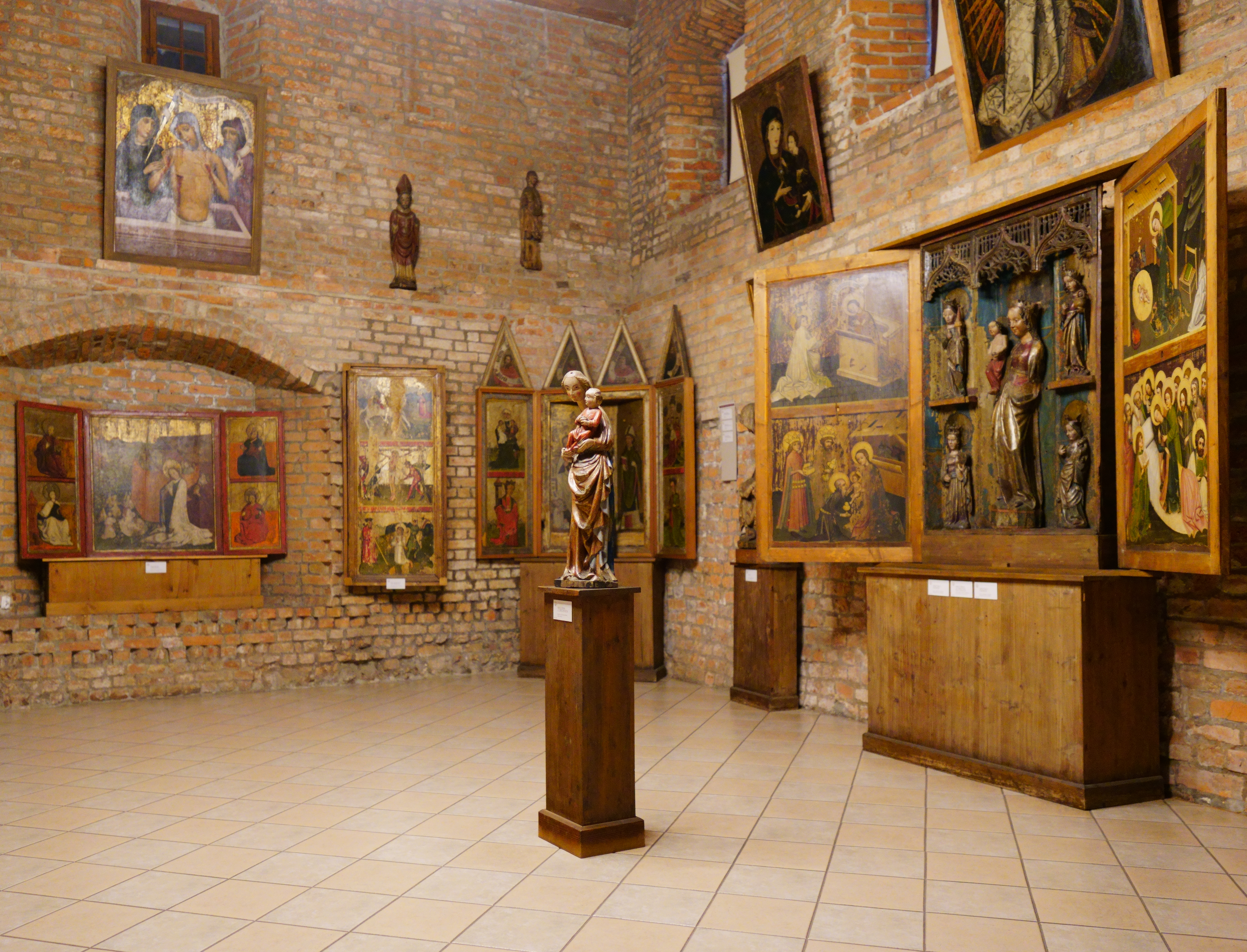
Interior of the building, showing the spacious hall created by removing the first floor

Between 1948 and 1952, the building was revitalized and adapted for museum purposes. As part of extensive construction work, the ceiling between floors was removed, the staircase was eliminated, a new beam ceiling was installed, original masonry patterns were uncovered, and a new roof was placed on the structure. Additionally, decorations in the form of sgraffito were created.

In 1991, the building was entered into the register of immovable monuments of the Tarnów Voivodeship (register number A-338 on 19 July 1991). Its name (Akademiola) comes from the term for the first Tarnów school. Today, it is used by the Tarnów Diocesan Museum, housing a gallery of Lesser Poland Gothic art, with paintings and sculptures on display. Among the exhibits in Akademiola are the Lamentation from Chromanic painting and the sculpture of St. John the Baptist on a basin from the second half of the 13th century, the oldest exhibit in the museum.

== Architecture ==
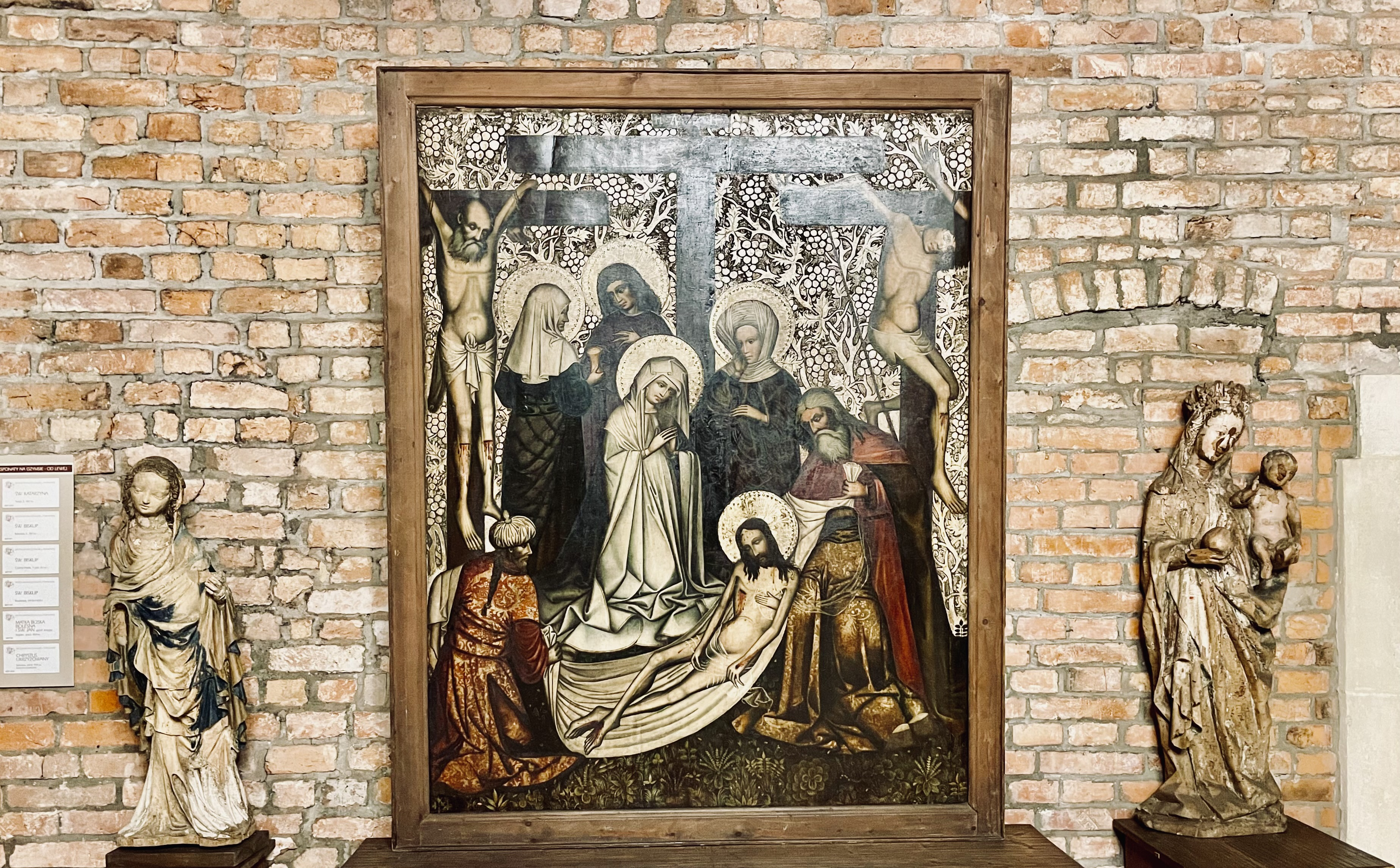
Lamentation from Chomranice – one of the paintings in the Gothic art gallery

The tenement house is an example of Renaissance architecture from the 16th century. It is a masonry, two-story, single-bay building constructed on an elongated trapezoidal plan with an obliquely positioned rear wall. It lacks a basement. The structure was built with Gothic-Polish brickwork measuring 27×13×7.5 cm, while the door frame and the transom above it were made of stone. The building is situated several dozen centimeters below the contemporary level of the adjacent Cathedral Square.

During the 1948–1952 revitalization, one story was removed, and partition walls introduced during the building's adaptation for school purposes were eliminated. Today, the tenement consists of only two spacious and high rooms on the ground floor. In 1991, the floors in these rooms were made of planks (in the southern room) and bricks (in the northern room).

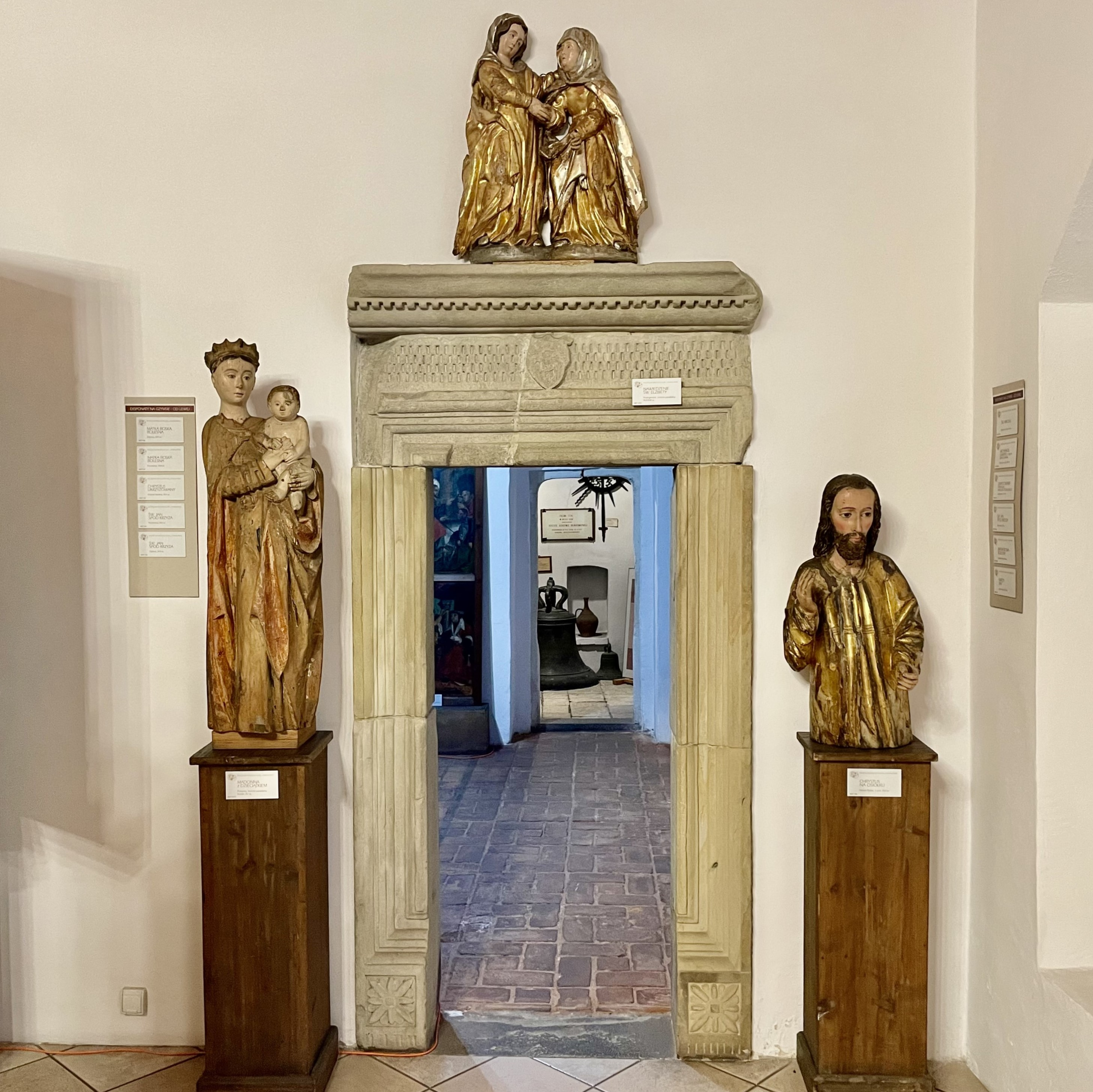
Portal transferred from Tropsztyn Castle, located in the Akademiola

A rectangular door opening with a stone frame featuring chamfered edges is situated in the wall separating the rooms. Additionally, a stone portal with a Renaissance lintel adorned with a plait motif, transferred from the ruins of Tropsztyn Castle, was placed in the passage between the Akademiola and the Mikołajowski House. The interiors are further complemented by two stoves located in the corners of the rooms. Arcaded niches are set into the southern and eastern walls (near the entrance doors). The ceilings are wooden and beam-based.

The front wall is modest, asymmetrical, smooth, and features five axes. It lacks architectural divisions. At the height of the former inter-story ceiling, steel anchor plates are visible.

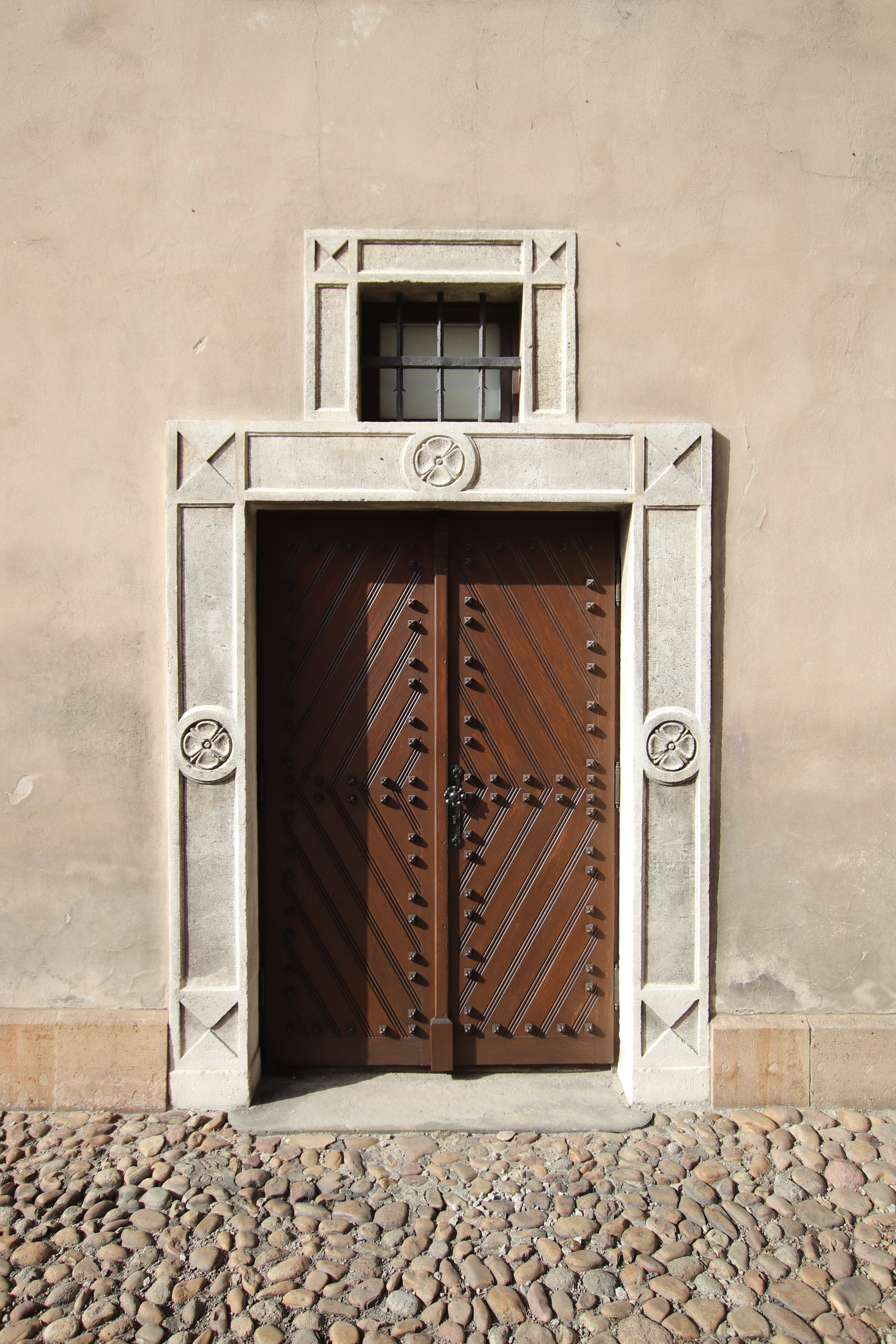
Main Mannerist portal of the building

The facade's main ornament is a Mannerist door portal in the form of a stone frame decorated with rose windows and four-petaled flowers placed on the lintel and at the center of the jambs. Additional embellishments include square envelopes located in the corners of the frame. The transom above the doorway is protected by an iron wrought grille and framed similarly to the door portal, but without rose windows.

The facade also features window openings arranged such that three windows and the door with the transom illuminate the northern room, while the windows on the first three axes illuminate the southern room. They are adorned with sgraffito. The windows are double-winged and crossbarred, divided into smaller panes by muntins. Each opening has two panes, between which iron grilles made of square rods are installed in the frame. The lintels above the window openings are brick-arched, while both door and window openings are splayed on the inside. Two lanterns are also mounted on the front wall.

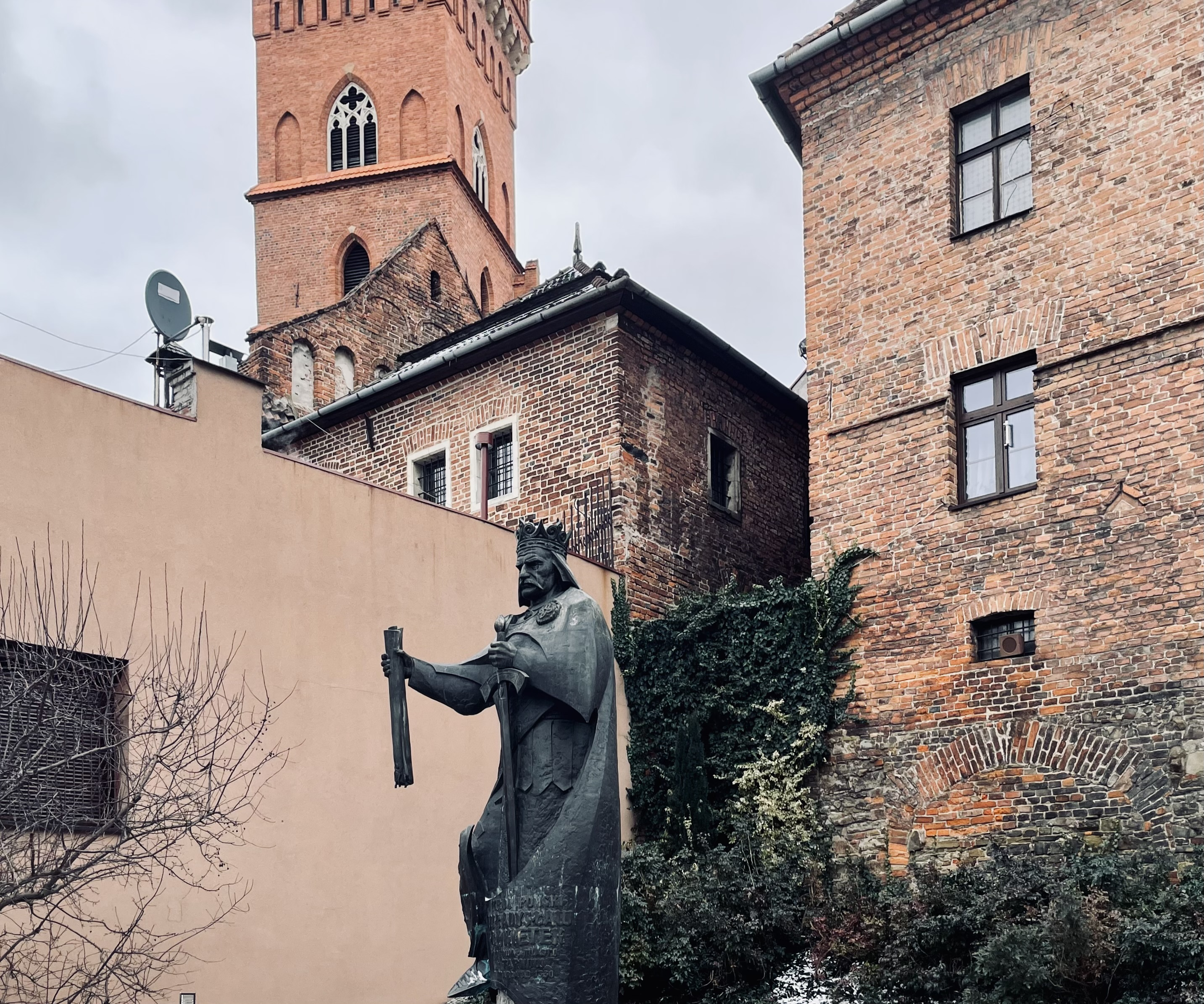
View of buildings at Cathedral Square from Wałowa Street. Visible scholasteria and the gable wall of the Akademiola, with plastered niches and an arcade ornament

The rear wall of the tenement is set on old city walls. It is plainly finished, unplastered, and lacks architectural divisions or decorations. Part of the wall at ground level forms a section of the former defensive wall and has no openings, while the superstructure on the upper floor contains seven small windows of equal size, three illuminating the northern room and four the southern one.

The gable, adjacent to the scholasteria building, is concealed up to the height of the upper floor's ceiling. Above this structure, the exposed wall is equipped with a brick ornament in the form of three arcades and eight plastered niches below. A small, narrow window is placed under the roof to provide light to the attic.

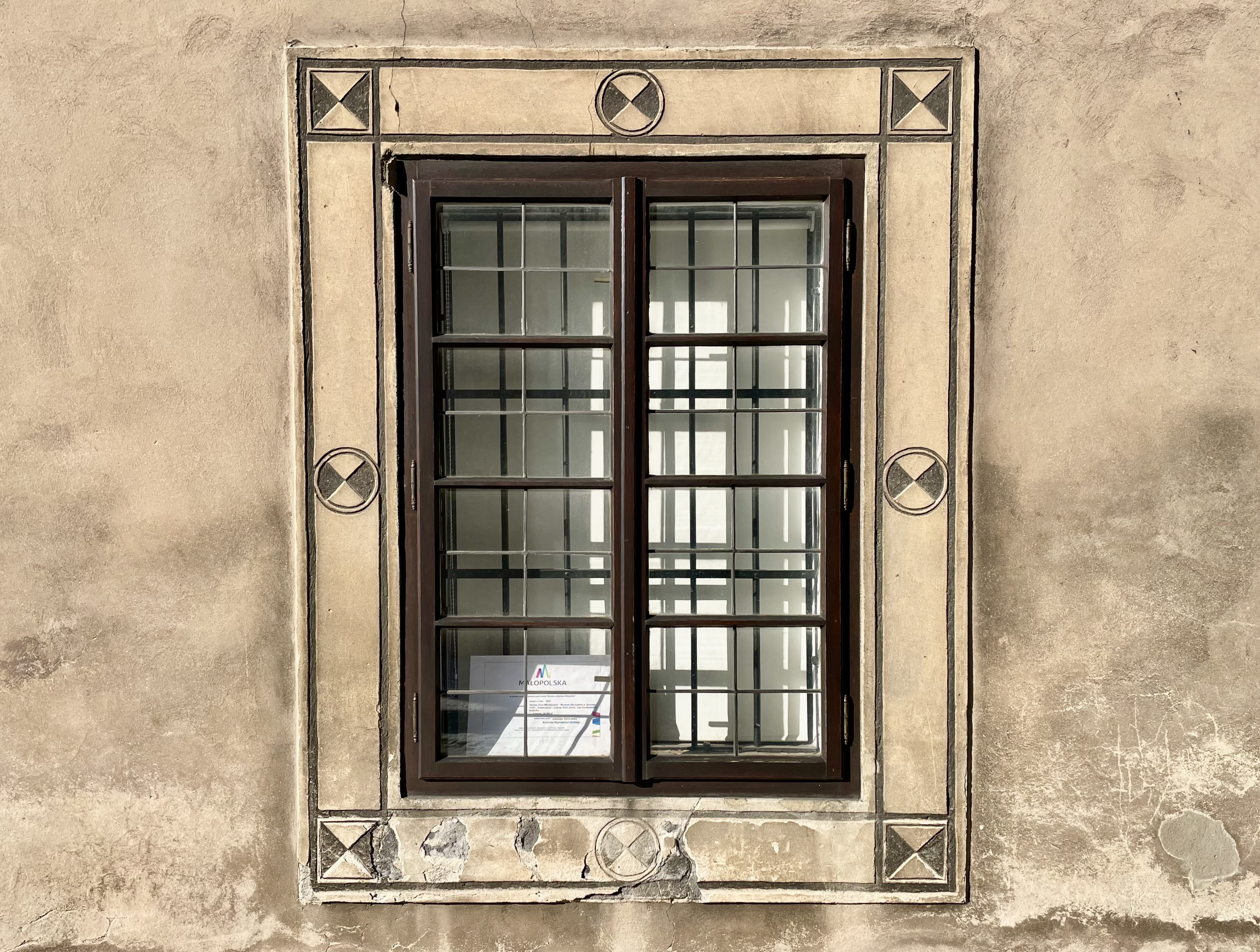
Window opening adorned with sgraffito

The timber roof truss is wooden, purlin-and-clamp with two hangers. It is a high, gable roof with a break in the roof slopes due to the non-parallel alignment of the building's longitudinal walls and the use of brackets. The roof is covered with ceramic tiles. Firewalls separate the roof slopes from adjacent buildings, and a wooden ridge turret is placed in the middle of the roof ridge.

The building has a usable area of 150 m^{2} and a volume of 1,025 m^{3}. As of 1991, it was equipped with an alarm system, electrical installation, water supply connection, and fire detectors. At that time, its owner was the Tarnów Diocesan Curia.

== In culture ==
The interior of the Akademiola was immortalized in one of Stefan Witold Matejko's sketches in the late 19th century. Stefan was the nephew of Jan Matejko.
