= Mikołajowski House in Tarnów =

Building in Tarnów, Poland

- Dom Mikołajowski w Tarnowie
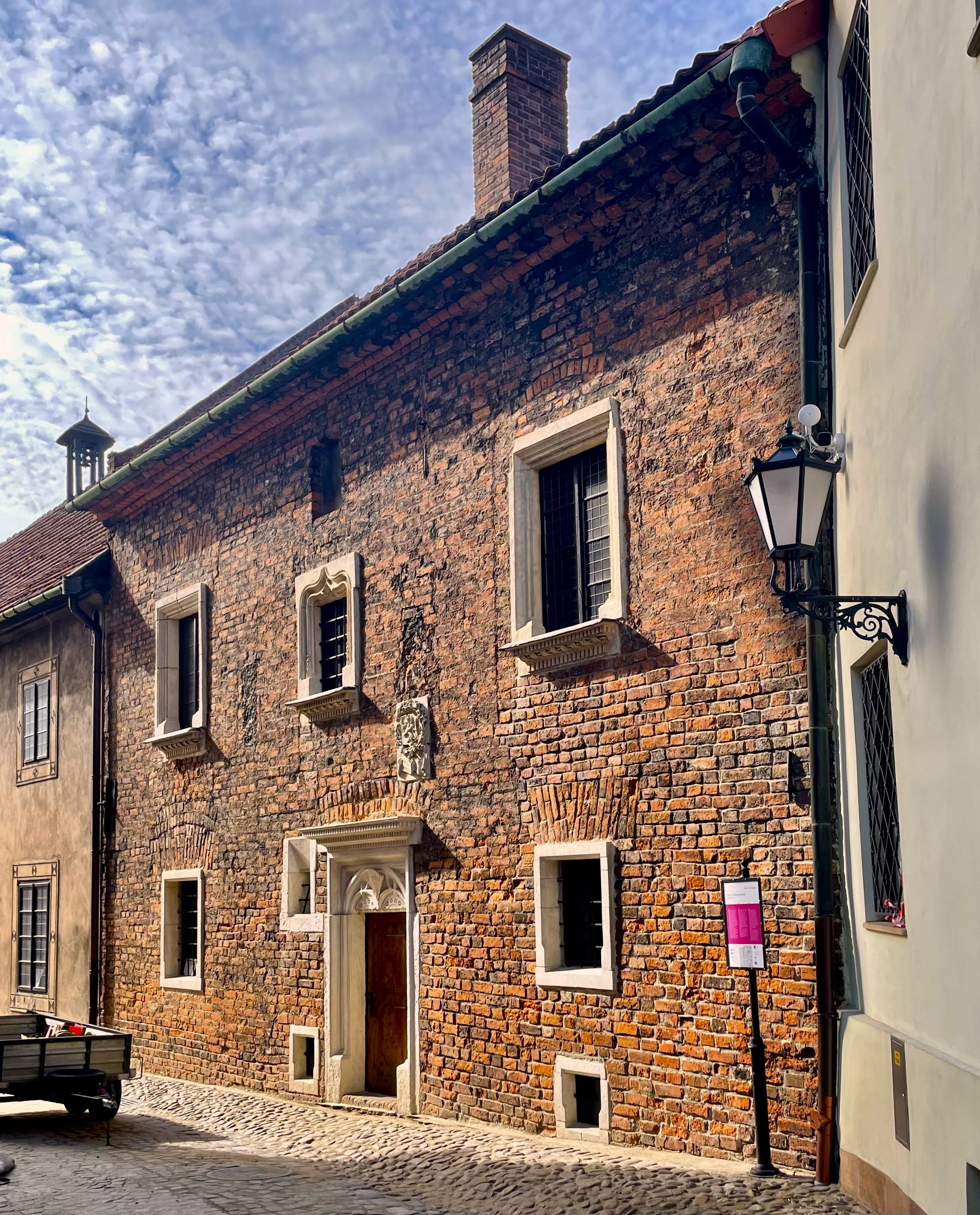
- View of the façade of the Mikołajowski House

- Location within Poland

General information
- Type: tenement
- Architectural style: Gothic style, Renaissance
- Location: Tarnów; Poland, 5 Cathedral Square
- Coordinates: 50°00′47″N 20°59′12″E
- Construction started: 16th century
- Completed: 1524
- Renovated: first half of the 19th century, 1940s–1950s
- Owner: Diocesan Curia of Tarnów

Technical details
- Floor count: 2
- Floor area: 97 m^{2} (1,040 sq ft)

The Mikołajowski House in Tarnów (also known as the Mikołajowskis' House, Kornuszowski House, or Koruszowska Tenement) is a historic Gothic-Renaissance building located at Cathedral Square in Tarnów. It was built in the 16th century and has served various functions throughout the centuries, including as a residence for the clergy, housing schools, the District Health Center, and the Museum of Hygiene. Since the conservation work carried out in the late 1940s and early 1950s, it has been home to the exhibition halls of the Tarnów Diocesan Museum. It is considered the oldest tenement in the city.

== Location ==
The building is situated at the northwestern corner of Cathedral Square in Tarnów's Old Town, in an alley near the tower of the Tarnów Cathedral. It forms part of the dense western frontage of the square, with its front wall facing east. The structure is attached to the defensive wall and adjoins the Mansionaries' House and the Akademiola (sometimes referred to as the scholasteria).

== History ==
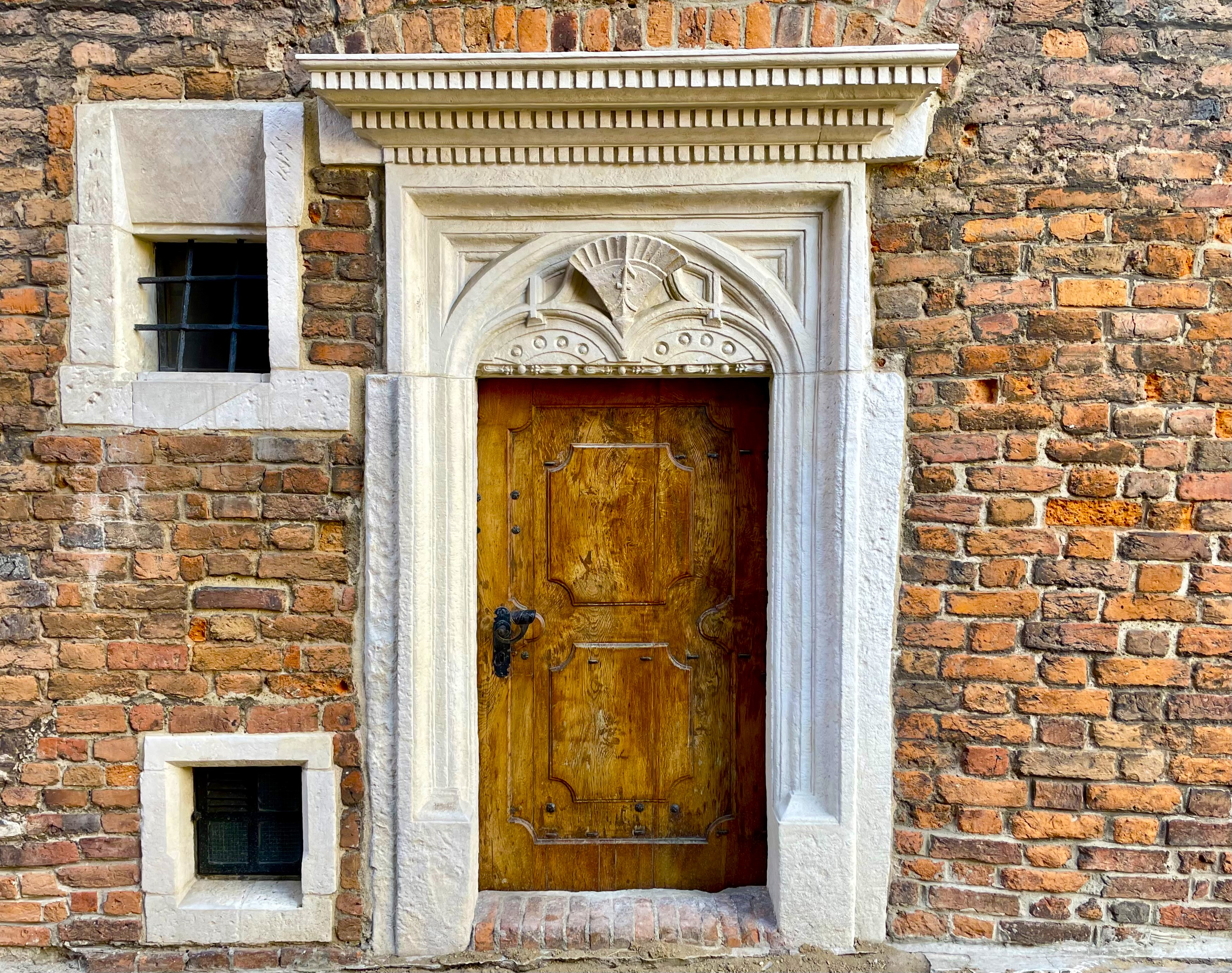
Entrance portal of the Mikołajowski House

The exact date of the construction of the Mikołajowski House is unknown. Based on coats of arms and foundation plaques located on the front façade and inside the building, it is believed to have been built in 1524 by Jan Mikołajowski of the Gryf coat of arms, and his wife, Barbara, who originated from Mikołajowice. However, this date is questioned by a record from 1527, which mentions an earlier name for the tenement, "Koruszowska" or "Kornuszowska". The depiction of an element of the Kościesza coat of arms in the entrance portal, unassociated with the Mikołajowski family, further suggests an earlier origin. It is likely that Jan Mikołajowski acquired an existing building, likely dating from the late 15th or early 16th century, and remodeled it into the form that largely persists today.

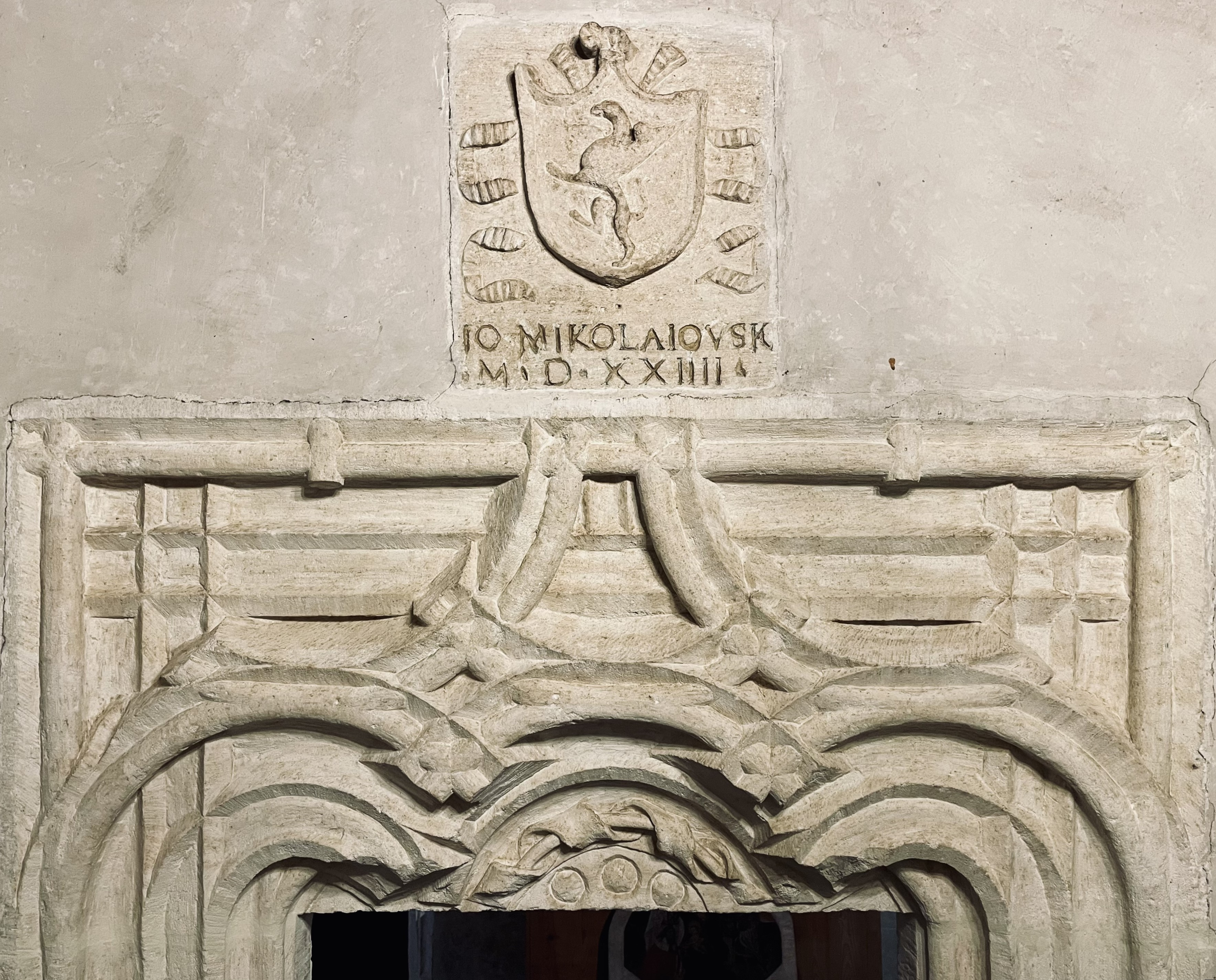
One of the portals inside the building, with a foundation plaque visible above it

In 1527, the Mikołajowski family, with the approval of Jan Tarnowski, donated the house to Tarnów's vicars. In return, the vicars committed to conducting two monthly masses for the repose of the Mikołajowski family's souls. By 1547, the vicars exchanged the house, with the consent of the Tarnów chapter, for a newly constructed tenement referred to as "Castle" or "Jurków", located near the provost's residence. The house was transferred to cantor Marcin Blady.

In 1554, Marcin Blady sold the tenement for 140 PLN to Mikołaj Łowczowski of Pleśna under a lifetime lease. The sale was conditional upon the property reverting to the Tarnów chapter after Łowczowski's death, provided his heirs were reimbursed the purchase price. This occurred in 1578.

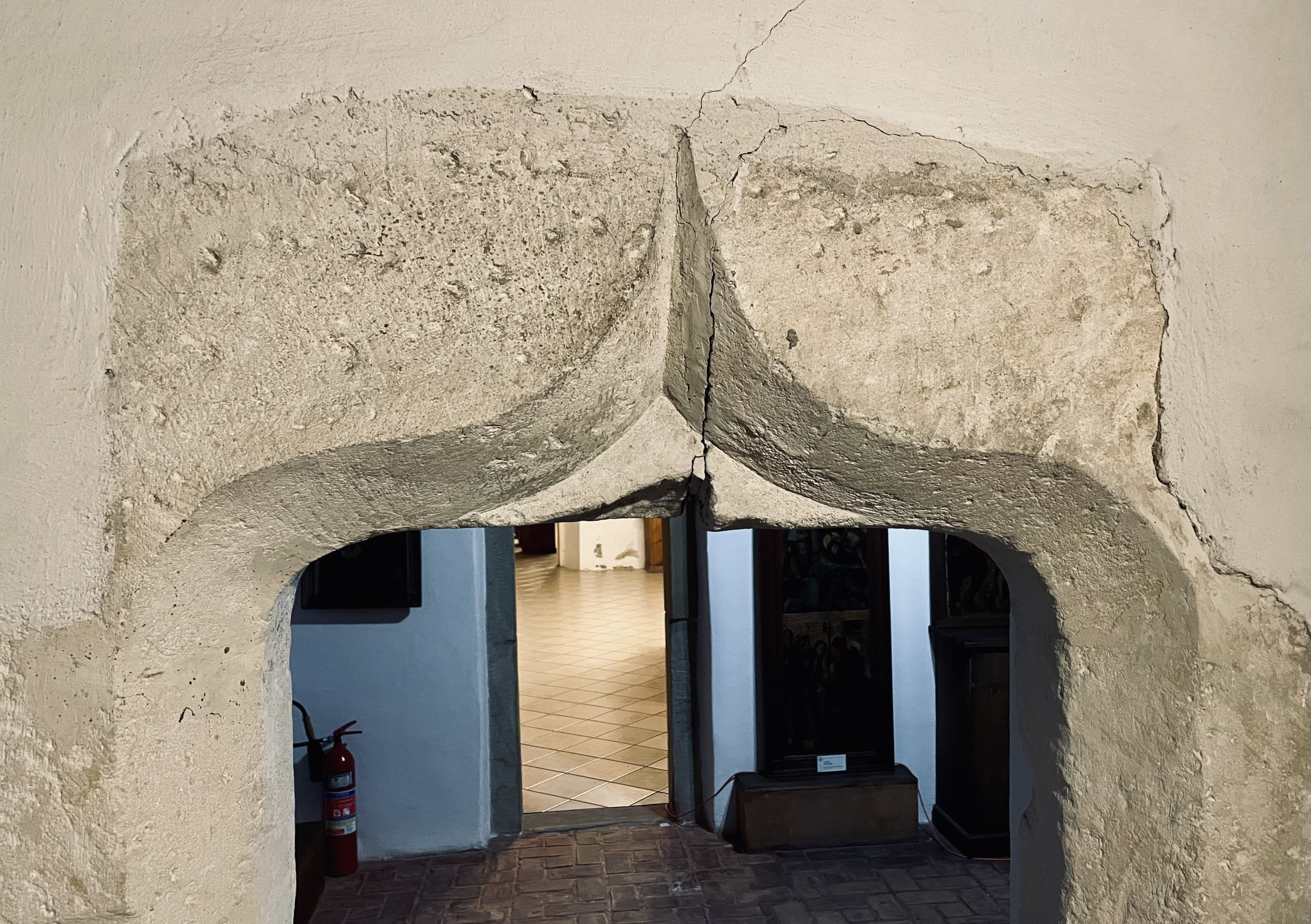
Portal with a frame forming an ogee arch

For the next two centuries, the house remained under the chapter's ownership, hosting various occupants. It often served as the cantor's residence and was also used as accommodation for the provost.

By the early 18th century, the house had fallen into disrepair. In 1719, the chapter allowed Canon Wojciech Skwarkiewicz to occupy the property on the condition that he renovate it. At the same time, other canons who came to the city for monthly stays and lacked their own residences also lived in the building. Skwarkiewicz, however, never fulfilled the commitment to renovate the house. After his death, his successor, Stanisław Kaszewicz, took over the building, again under the condition that he would organize the necessary renovations. Kaszewicz also failed to carry out the work. From 1725 to 1749, the building was used by his mother, a merchant, who converted it into a grain warehouse.

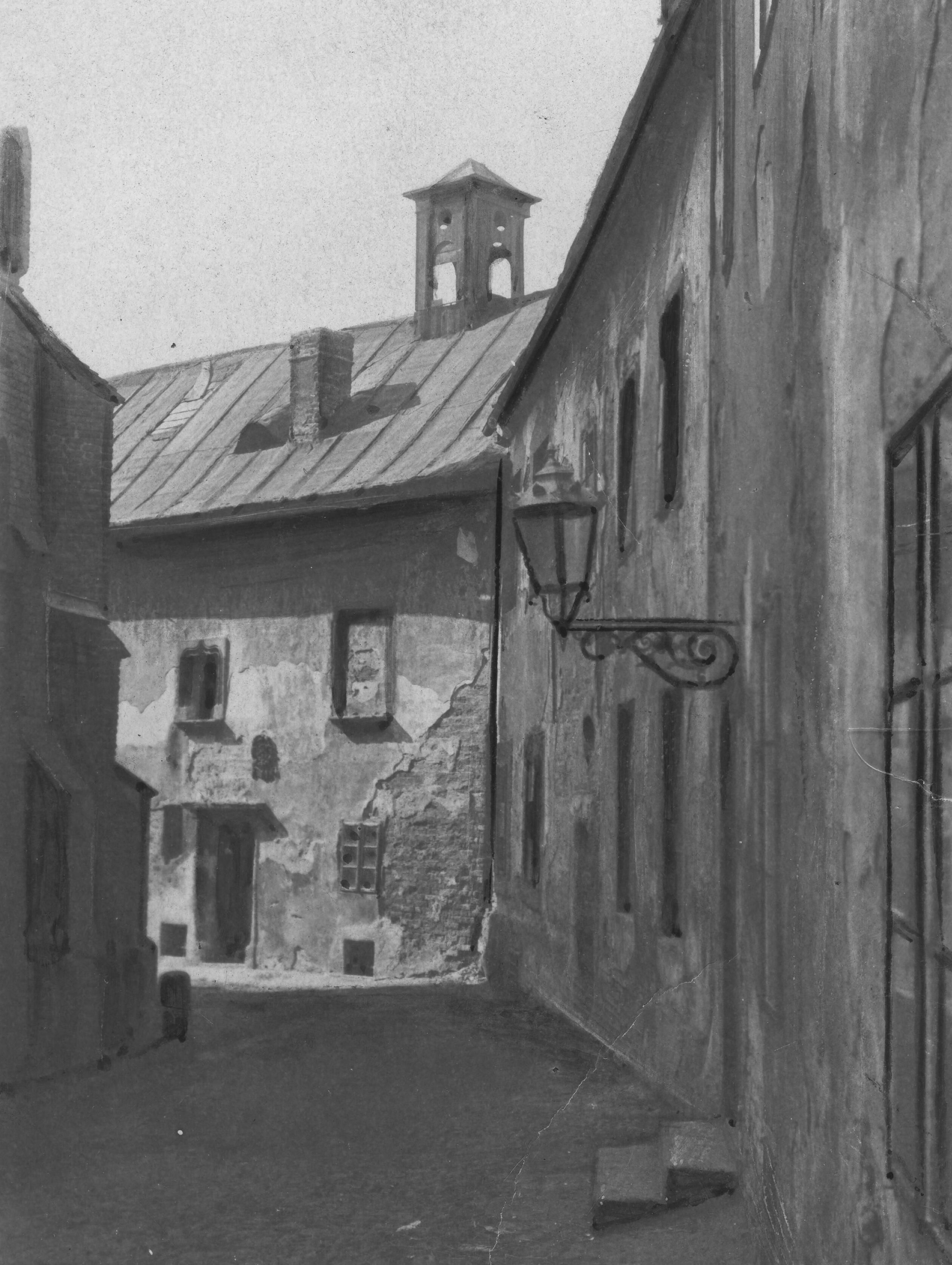
View of the ruined Mikołajowski and Mansionaries' houses at the beginning of the 20th century

In 1749, the house was granted lifelong usage to Wojciech Kaszewicz, provided that he would carry out necessary renovations. In 1753 or 1756, based on his foundation, a small academic colony called Akademiola was established in Tarnów. However, other sources suggest that in the 1750s only a small academy was formed, and the academic colony was officially established in 1760 by the Bishop of Kraków, Kajetan Sołtyk, who confirmed Kaszewicz's foundation. In 1760, the rector of the academy took residence in the house as planned by the founder, and Bishop Sołtyk granted the academic colony indefinite rights to the house, which led to a conflict between the colony and the Tarnów chapter over the building's ownership.

In 1766, the rector of the academy, Stanisław Wątorski, reported that the building was in poor condition, with the roof needing repairs. The roof tiles were described as ancient, coming from the Collegiate Church (now the Tarnów Cathedral). In 1773, the Tarnów chapter unsuccessfully demanded that the Bishop of Kraków assign the Mikołajowski House to the chapter to be converted into a residence for canons. In the 1760s and 1770s, parts of the building were inhabited by the rector of the academy and students, while other sections were left unused and decaying.

After the Austrian occupation of Tarnów during the First Partition of Poland, the academic colony was first placed under the supervision of the chapter in 1780 and dissolved in 1784 (or 1792, according to some sources). The Austrian gymnasium was established in its place. Until 1784, the house was inhabited by the rectors of the academy, after which it was occupied by the new Austrian school and designated as a residence for its prefect. However, this plan was never realized as the house was already inhabited by clergy.

In 1791, the building was confiscated as church property and transferred to the Religious Fund. A few years later, in 1795, the building was reported to be in good condition.

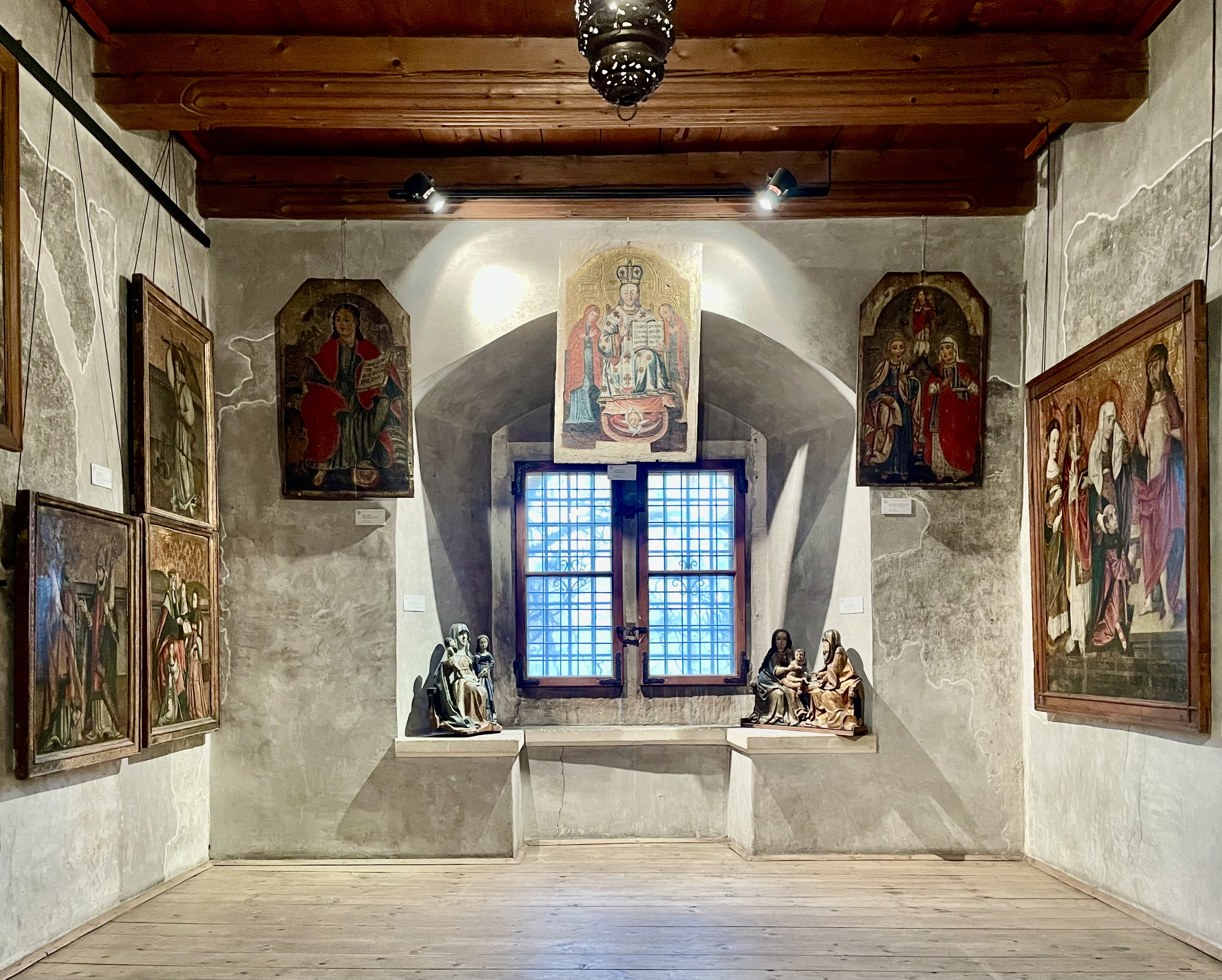
Room on the upper floor with preserved remnants of 16th-century polychromes

In 1810, at the request of the gymnasium's director, the building underwent partial reconstruction. Its southern wall was demolished to connect it with the neighboring Akademiola, and both buildings were covered by a common roof. Between 1814 and 1817 until 1856, the Mikołajowski house was inhabited by the directors of the gymnasium, occupying its northern and central rooms. From at least 1818 until 1880, a passage was created through the western (rear) wall of the building, connecting the Old Town area within the former city walls to Wałowa Street.

In the 19th century, various educational institutions were based in the house, including the main school, girls' school, gymnasium, and teacher's course. In 1896, the building was vacated by the male school, and in 1897, by the decision of the city council, it temporarily housed the real school. Some rooms were also allocated to the girls' department school, which operated here until 1903.

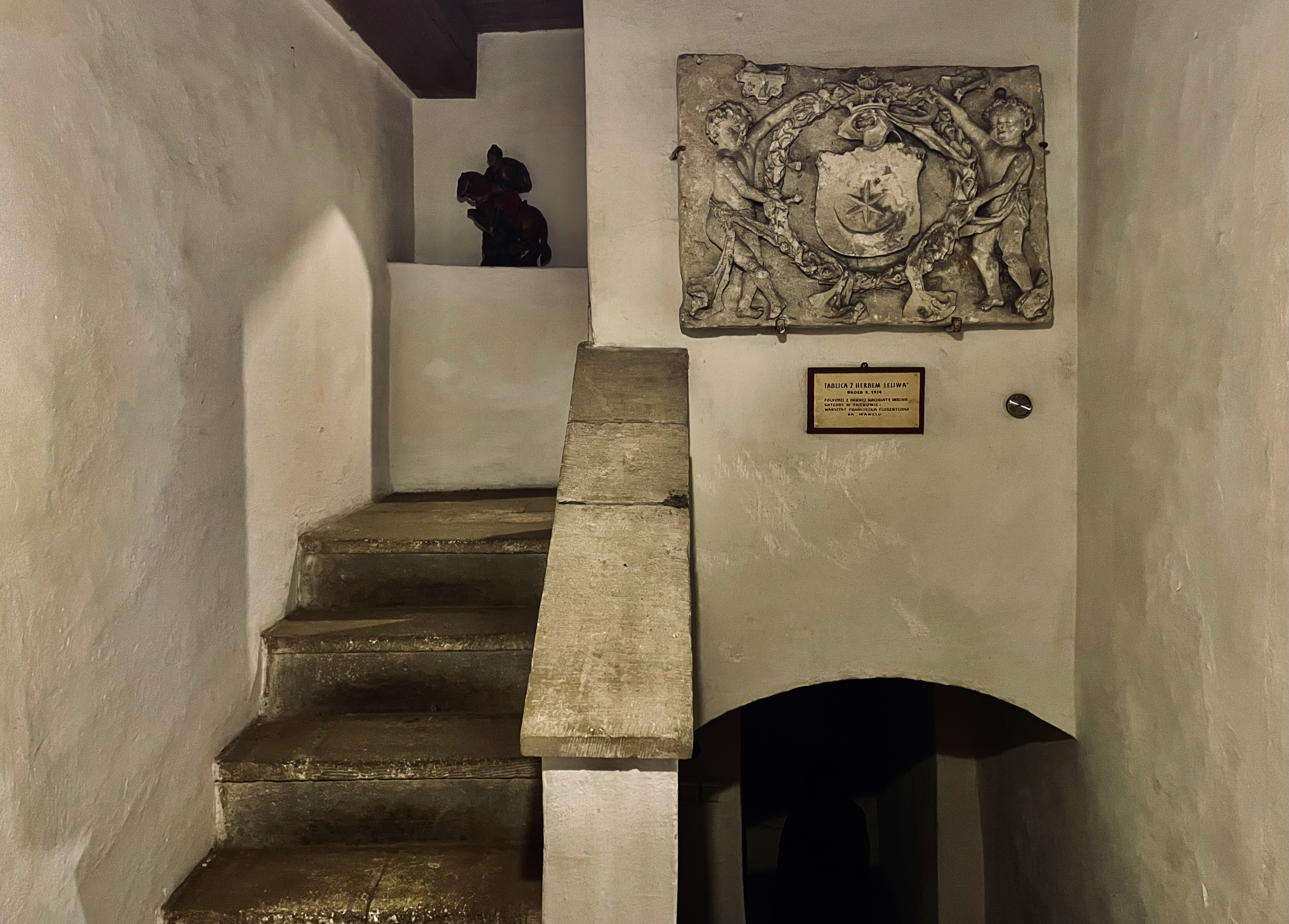
Entrance hall of the tenement. On the left, visible steps lead to the spiral staircase, and on the right, there is a descent to the basement

At the beginning of the 20th century, the Mikołajowski House, along with the neighboring connected buildings, was jointly owned by the municipality of Tarnów, the National School Fund, and the Scientific Fund. Plans for its reconstruction were being considered, but these were abandoned in 1903 when the municipal authorities deemed the house, which was in complete ruin, to be a dilapidated building. In 1904, all schools ceased using the building, and from then on, it was either used for residential purposes or, according to some sources, not used at all. Due to its poor technical condition, demolition was considered; however, thanks to the intervention of Archduke Franz Ferdinand and the decision of the Commission for the Preservation of Artistic Monuments, the demolition did not take place. Furthermore, following the commission's decision, the mayor submitted a request to the government for a subsidy to revitalize the property.

In 1930, at the initiative of the district doctor Maciej Waręda, the building housed the District Health Center and the Hygiene Museum. It was used to treat social diseases, with the center's clinics (anti-tuberculosis, anti-venereal, and anti-trachoma) starting operations on 6 May 1930. Three years after the center opened, 268 patients were treated for tuberculosis, over 100 for trachoma, and 87 prostitutes for venereal diseases. In 1938, by decision of Bishop Franciszek Lisowski, the Tarnów diocesan curia purchased the Mikołajowski House. In 1944, the house was given a separate roof, and the curia decided to adapt it for use as the Tarnów Diocesan Museum. Between 1946 and 1952 (or between 1947 and 1949, according to some sources), a thorough renovation of the building was carried out, during which the original layout and room configurations were restored, and the building was adapted for museum purposes.

In 1991, the building was entered into the register of historic monuments of the Tarnów Voivodeship (no. A-338 on 18 July 1991). It is considered the oldest tenement in Tarnów and currently houses exhibition halls for the Diocesan Museum. The exhibits include folk art collections and ecclesiastical embroidery and weaving from the 15th to the 19th centuries, including paraments and chasubles.

== Architecture ==
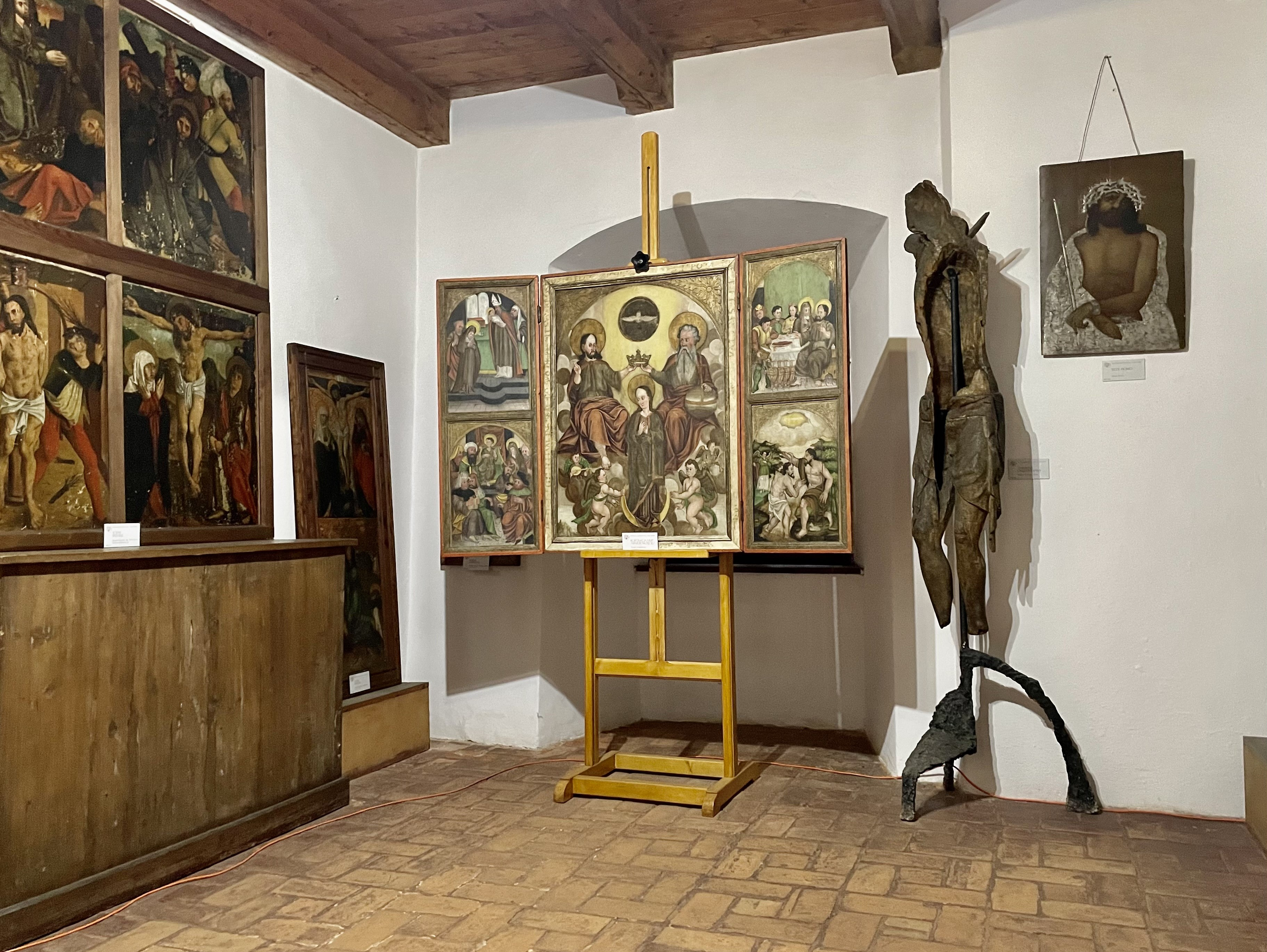
One of the rooms on the ground floor

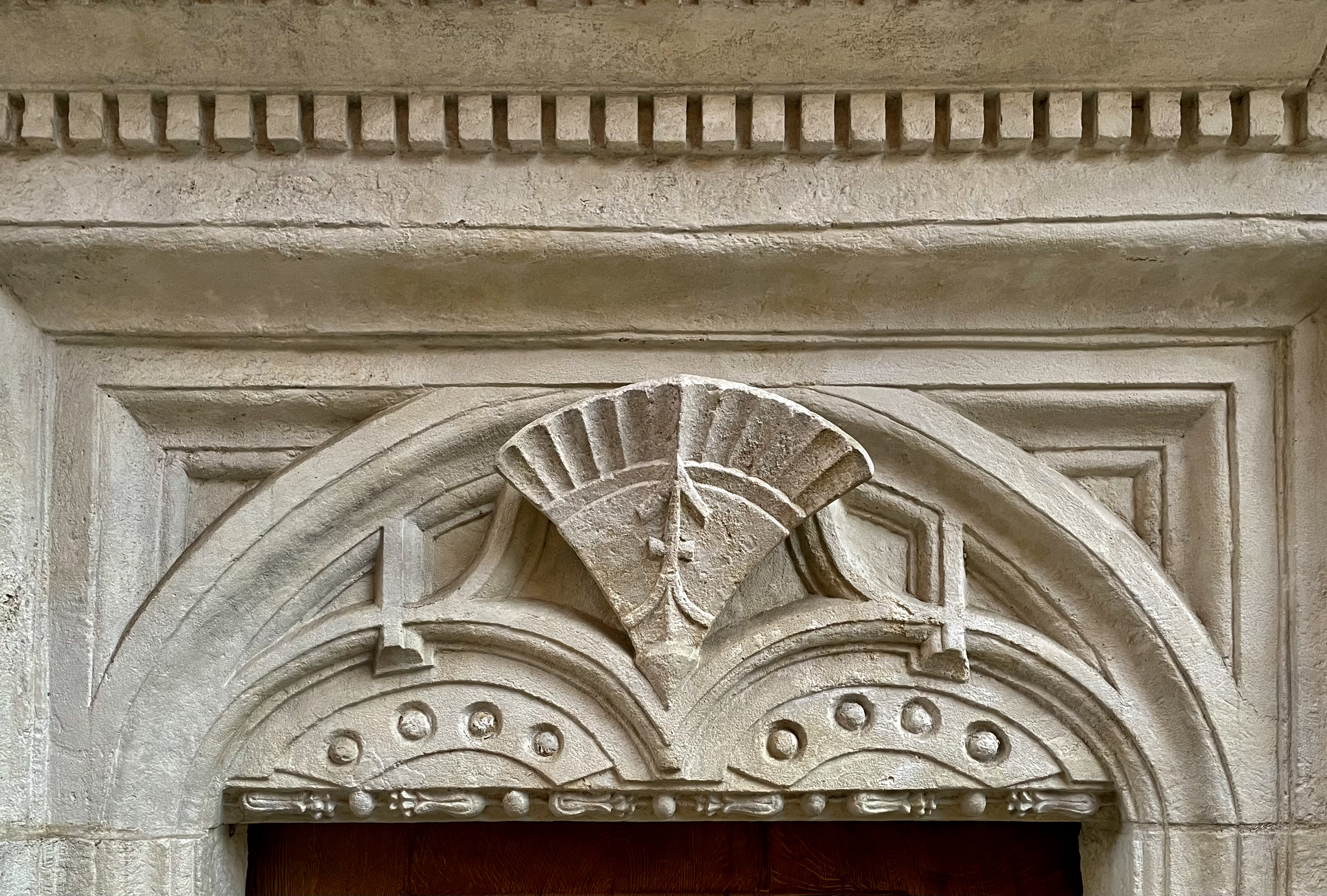
Detail of the entrance portal with the image of the Kościesza coat of arms

The building known as the Mikołajowski or Kornuszowski House is an example of a residential structure from the transition between the Gothic and Renaissance periods.

The building is two stories high and fully cellarized. It is constructed on a rectangular plan measuring 12.60 by 7.60 meters and is a single-bay building with a mixed structural layout. The walls are made of brick arranged in the Gothic-Polish brickwork, with some of the cellar walls made of glacial erratic. The door and window frames are made of sandstone. The bricks used in the construction of the townhouse measure 29×13×10, 25×12×9, and 27×13×10 cm.

The cellar and the northern room on the ground floor are covered with barrel vaults. Access to the cellar rooms is via a stone, single-flight staircase leading from the entrance hall on the ground floor. The cellar consists of two rooms, one of which is connected to the hall leading to the staircase. On the cellar level, there are two single-winged, square, barred windows.

The ground floor consists of a centrally located lobby and two other rooms on either side, directly accessible from the hall. The main entrance doors and a small, single-winged, casement window are located at the front of the hall. The floor in the hall is made of rectangular stone slabs, and along the eastern wall, there is a stone bench. At the rear of the hall is the descent to the cellar rooms, as well as a wall separating the entrance to the staircase leading to the upper floor, first a single-flight and then a spiral staircase. This staircase is square on the outside and round on the inside, with the steps turning from bottom to top in a rightward direction. It is also equipped with a stone handrail embedded in the wall.

The northern room on the ground floor is accessed through a stone portal decorated with geometric sculptural motifs, shaped like crystals. In this room, the floor is made of bricks arranged in a herringbone pattern, while in the southern room, the bricks are arranged in square patterns. The floor tiles of the ground floor are laid below the current ground level of the adjacent Cathedral Square.

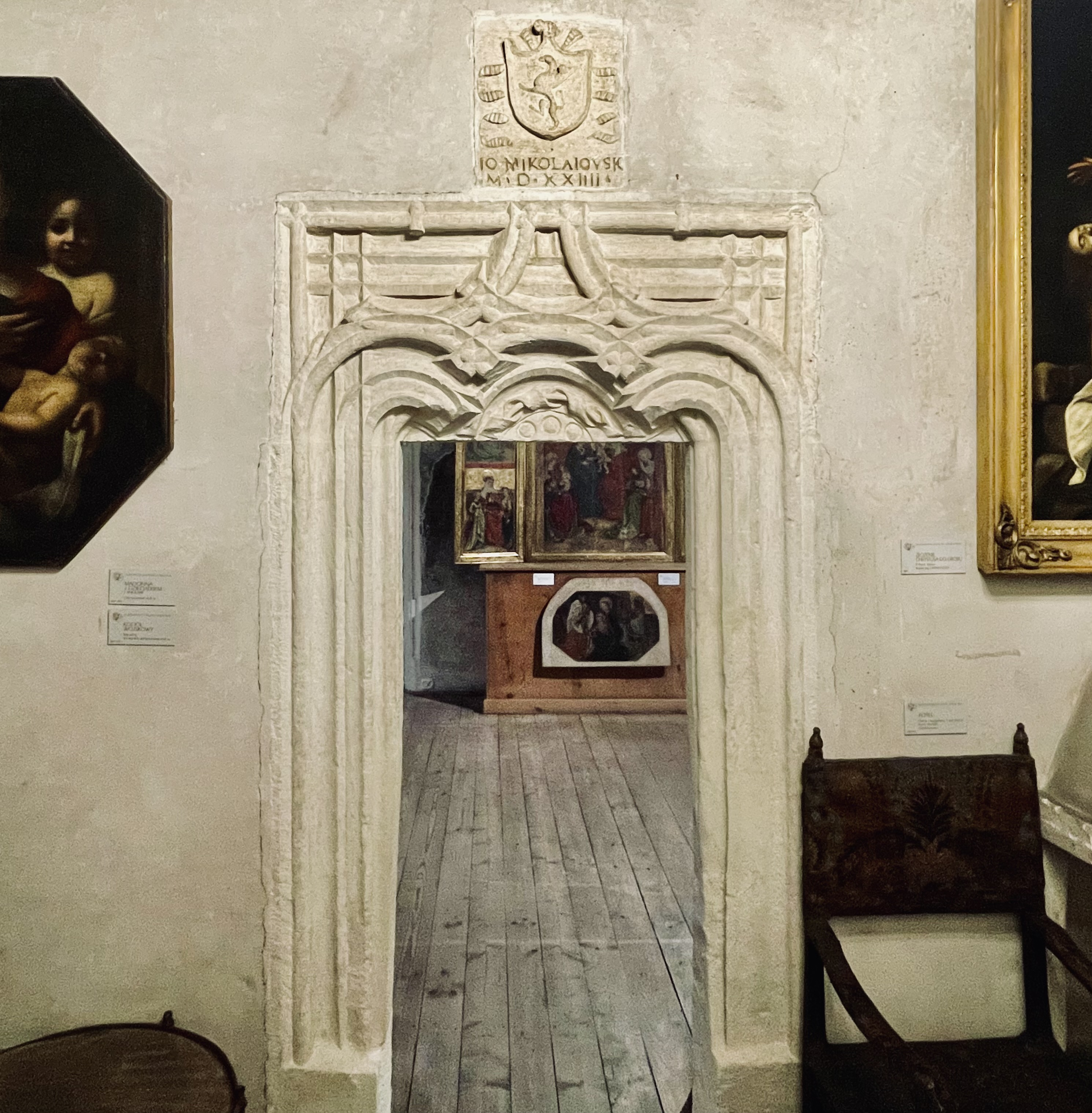
One of the portals on the upper floor of the building. Above it, the foundation plaque is visible

The layout of the rooms on the upper floor follows the same plan as the ground floor, except that where the lobby is located on the ground floor, there is a room on the upper floor. The ceilings above the rooms on the upper floor and part of the ground floor are beam ceilings, made of profiled and chamfered beams.

Inside the building, in the lobby, there are single-wing panel doors leading to the staircase; in other cases, no door wings are used, and communication between the rooms is provided by stone decorative portals. Two of them, located on the upper floor and leading to side rooms, are examples of Gothic-Renaissance portals of the Wawel type. Above one of them, the northern one, there is a stone plaque with an engraving of the Gryf coat of arms and the inscription "Jo Mikołajowski MDXXIIII". The portal itself is decorated with intersecting sticks, either running straight or forming arches, and it is built with a rectangular lintel and voussoirs. Another portal, the southern one, almost exactly matches the entrance portal in appearance, differing only in the decorative motif in the lintel, the profile of the decorative sticks, and the lack of a cornice that crowns the entrance portal. Another portal, with a blocked door opening, is an example of a Gothic-Renaissance portal and is located in the northern room adjacent to the Mansionaries' House. It is covered by a cornice with a distorted Renaissance structure and is adorned with sticks on its sides. These portals likely come from the workshop of Benedykt from Sandomierz, a master mason who, in the 1520s, was in charge of modernization works at Wawel Castle.

In the northern room on the upper floor, there are two brick window sills covered with stone slabs, located below the windowsill in the window recess. In the central room, also on the upper floor, there is a chimney niche with a hood. One of the rooms also retains remnants of 16th-century wall polychromes. The floors on the upper floor are made of wooden planks. A spiral wooden staircase leads from the upper floor to the unused attic.

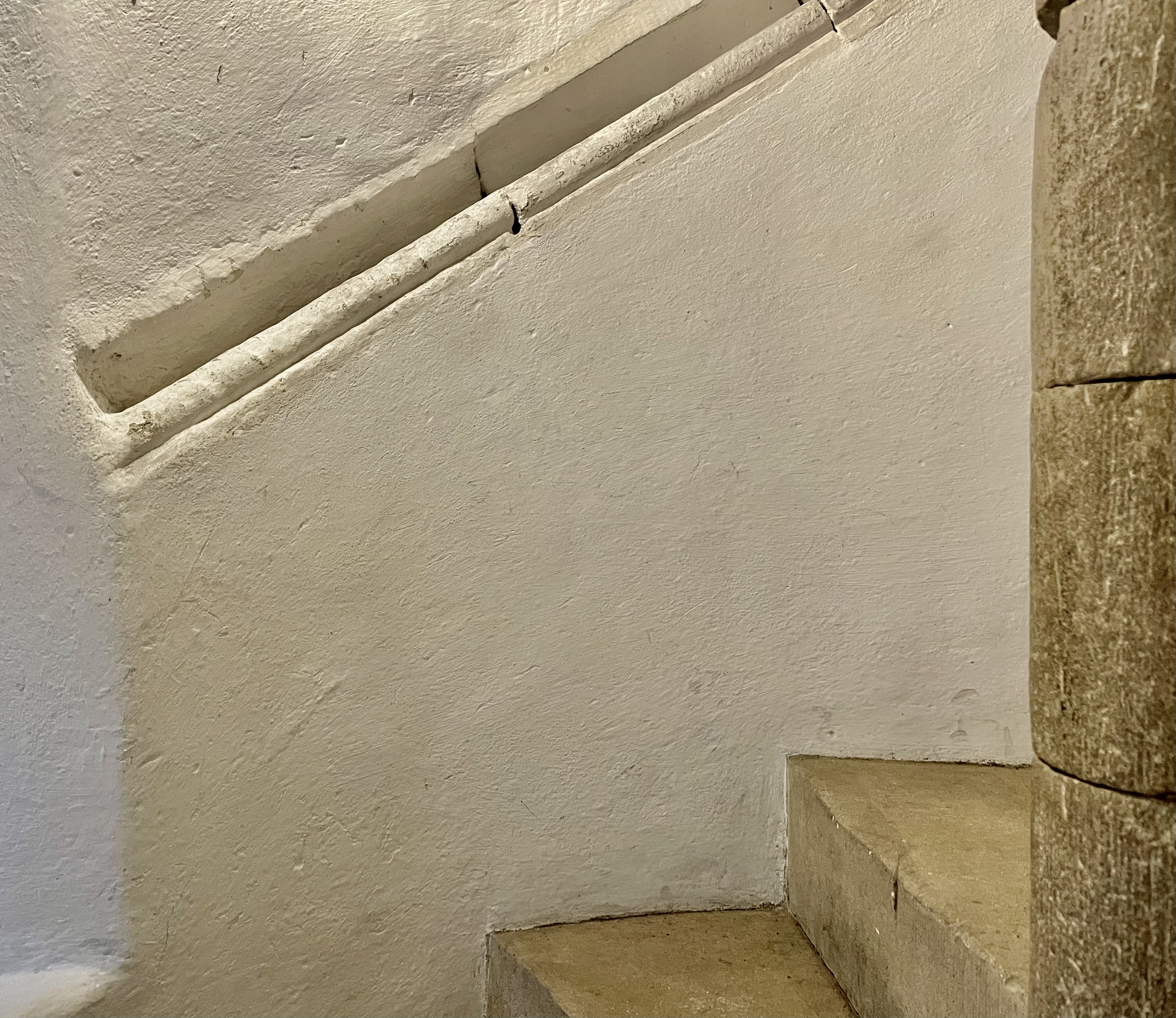
View of the base of the spiral staircase

The façade of the Mikołajowski House is modest, unplastered, asymmetrical, and three-bayed. There are no architectural divisions. At its center is the entrance portal with a small window located to its left. The front wall is further complemented by five rectangular window openings (two on the ground floor and three on the upper floor), equipped with stone lintels, jambs, and sills, as well as two cellar windows. The extreme window openings are aligned exactly above one another, on a single vertical axis, while the central window on the upper floor is located along the symmetry axis of the wall. The entrance portal is slightly shifted to the right of this axis. The front elevation is topped with a brick step cornice.

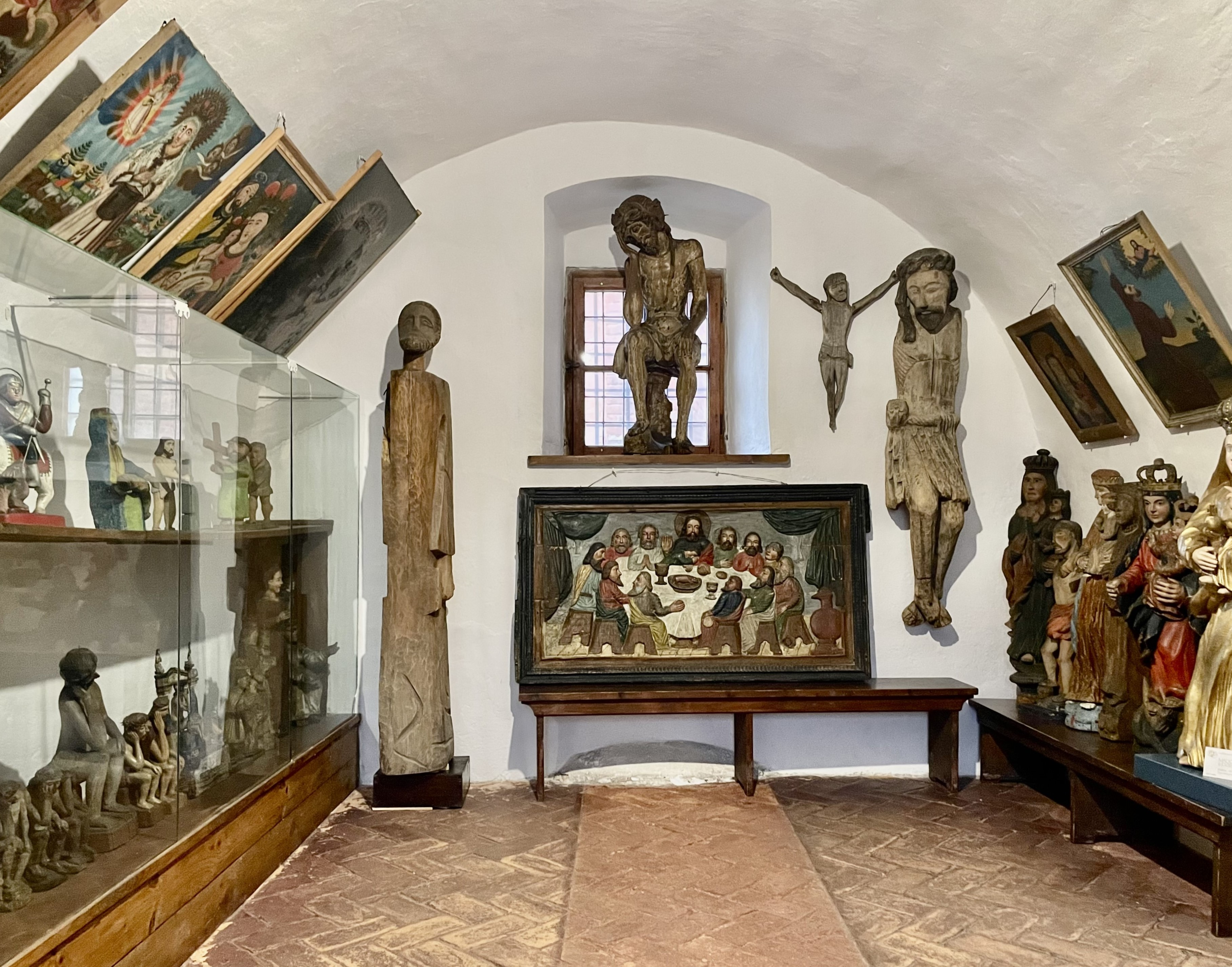
Ground-floor room with preserved barrel vault

The rooms on the ground floor and upper floor are illuminated by cross-framed, double-winged windows divided by wooden muntins, with square panes set in leaded glass. The cellar windows are small, square, and single-winged. The window openings on the ground floor vary in size, lack sculptural decoration, and have chamfered stone frames. The extreme windows on the upper floor are identical, with profiled stone frames, as well as window sills designed to resemble a stepping cornice with Ionic dentils and a spiral wrapped around a rod. The central window on the upper floor is also surrounded by a stone frame, but it forms an arch in the shape of an ogee, and, like the other upper-floor windows, it has a window sill. Above it is a rectangular recess. The windows on the ground floor, as well as the central ones on the upper floor, are equipped with iron square bar grilles.

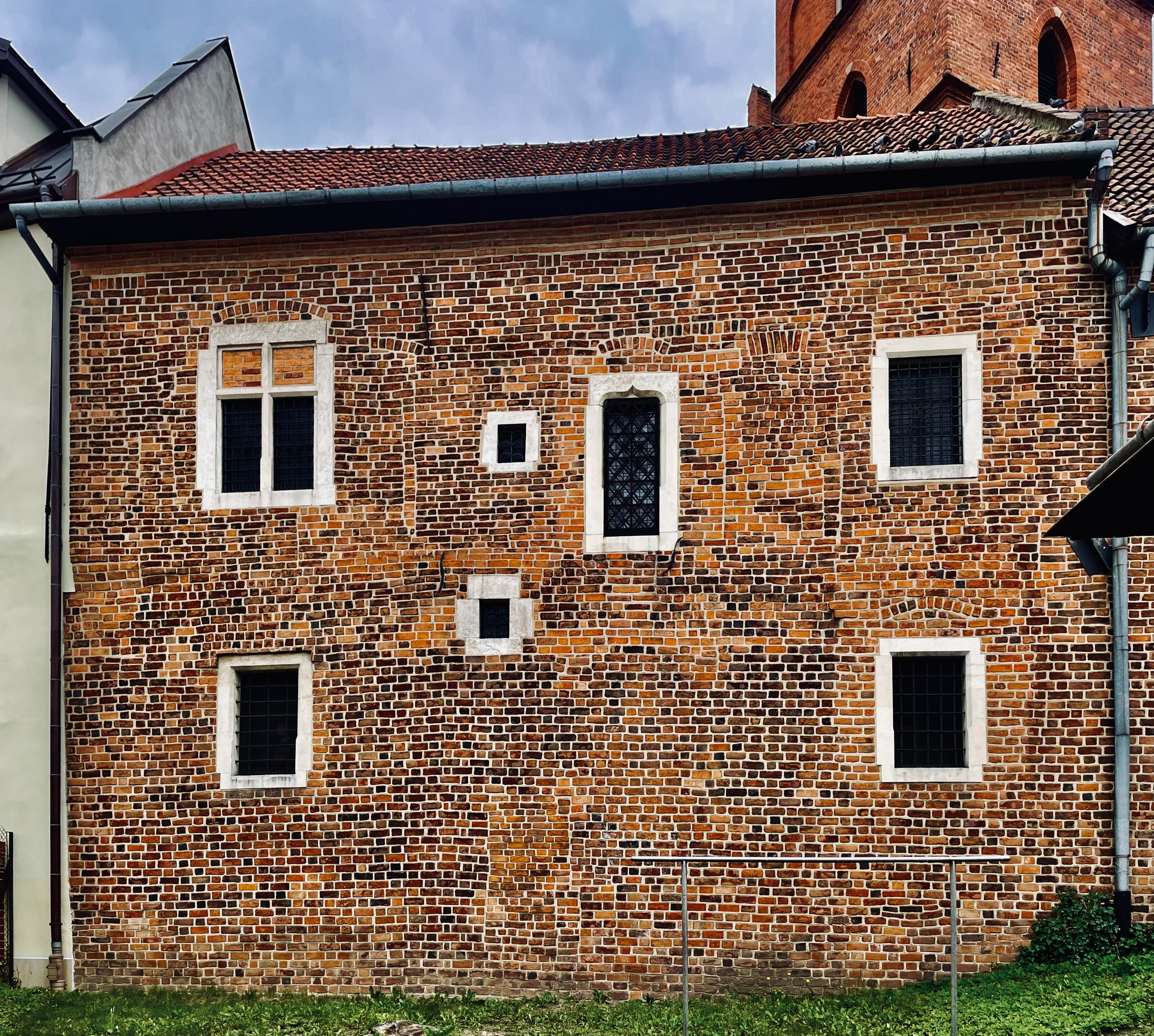
View of the rear elevation of the Mikołajowski House from the courtyard of the tenement at 13 Wałowa Street

The entrance portal, which serves a decorative function for the façade, is made of sandstone and consists of a rectangular lintel with a cornice and two jambs, along which three decorative sticks are vertically arranged, creating a full arch in the lintel, a double curve, and a rectangle in the line of the portal's frame. In the lintel, there is also a depiction of the Kościesza or Ostrogski coat of arms on a fan-shaped shield. Above the lintel, there is a three-step cornice decorated with Ionic dentils. The portal's door opening is rectangular, and the door is from the 18th century, single-winged, reinforced with iron wrought iron straps, and made of solid wooden planks.

In addition to the portal, the front elevation is also decorated by a rectangular stone erection plaque embedded in the wall, depicting the Gryf coat of arms surrounded by a plant ornament arranged in the form of a wreath. Below this ornament, Roman numerals are inscribed, with "M. D." on the left side, continuing to the right as "XXIIII". Below, there is a waving ribbon with rolled-up ends, bearing the inscription "Fundatio Domus per Joannem Mikolaiovsky MDXXIIII".

The rear, western wall of the tenement at the ground-floor level forms part of the former defensive wall and is built above it. It is plain, devoid of decoration and architectural divisions. The wall contains a bricked-up, simple door opening without a frame. The windows are randomly arranged, uneven in size, and equipped with chamfered stone frames. The larger window on the upper floor is located on the left side of the building, and in its center, there is a stone chamfered cross dividing the window into four sections. Additionally, the central window on the upper floor features chamfering that transitions into the shape of a hogback at the top. This wall is crowned with remnants of a brick stepped cornice.

The timber roof truss is wooden, with a mixed construction layout, collar-beam with two structural braces. The roof is steep, gabled, and covered with ceramic tiles.

The building has a usable area of 97 m² and a volume of 634 m³. According to the 1991 state, it was equipped with electrical wiring, an alarm system, and fire detectors. At that time, it was owned by the Diocese Curia in Tarnów.

== House in culture ==
During his visit to Tarnów in 1889, Stanisław Wyspiański captured in sketches the interior, one of the portals (or its frame), and the foundation plaque of the Mikołajowski House.
