= Cathedral Square, Tarnów =

Town square in the Old Town of Tarnów

Coordinates: 50.0129°N 20.9873°E

Cathedral Square
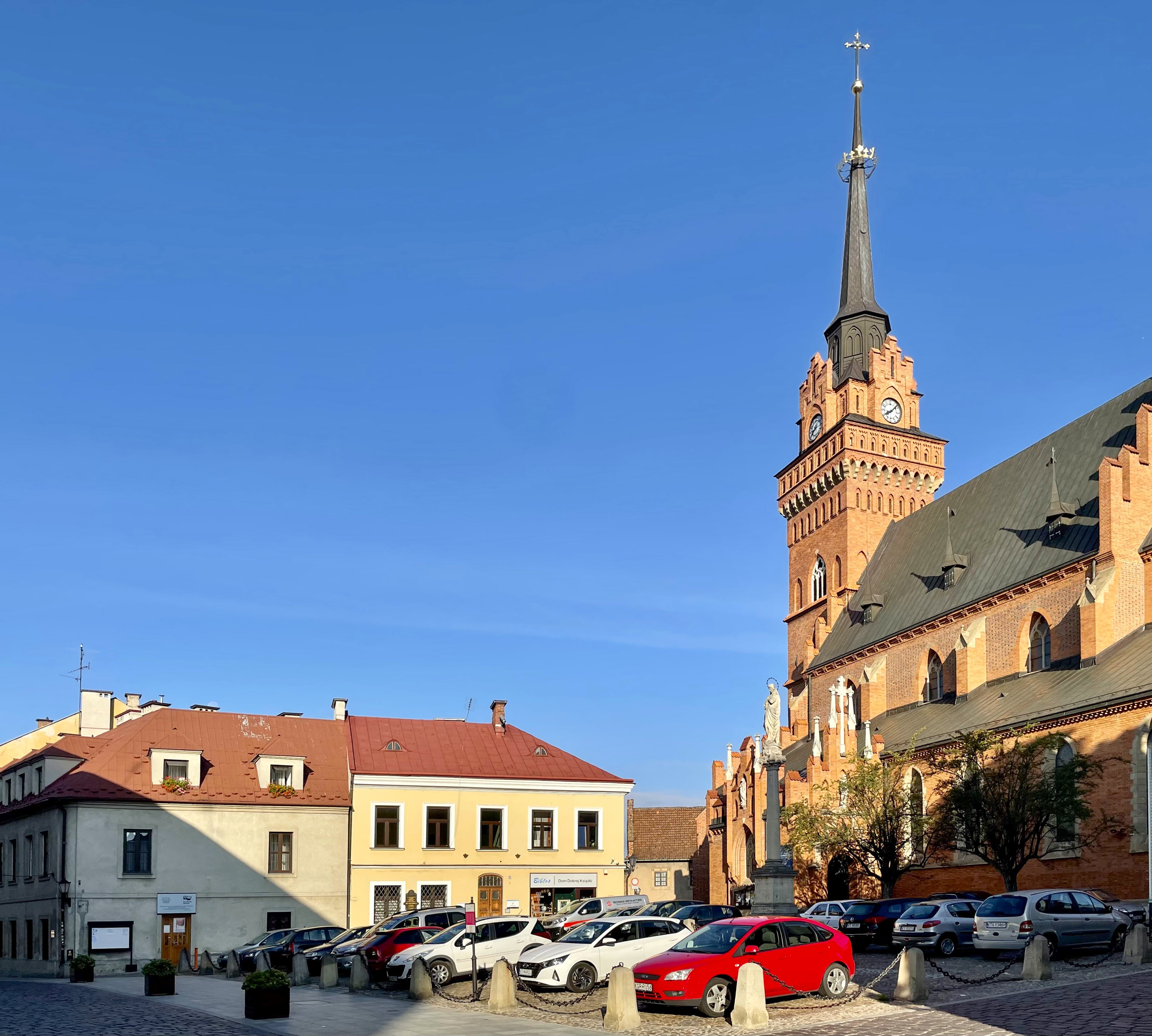
- View of the central part of the square
- Part of: Old Town
- Location: Tarnów

Cathedral Square in Tarnów (Polish: Plac Katedralny w Tarnowie) is a town square in the Old Town of Tarnów, located between Katedralna Street and Kapitulna Street, adjacent to the Market Square to the southeast. The square was established during the city's foundation on 7 March 1330. At the same time, construction began on the Gothic Tarnów Cathedral, which still stands today. Over the centuries, the square evolved through numerous construction projects, achieving its modern form at the turn of the 19th and 20th centuries.

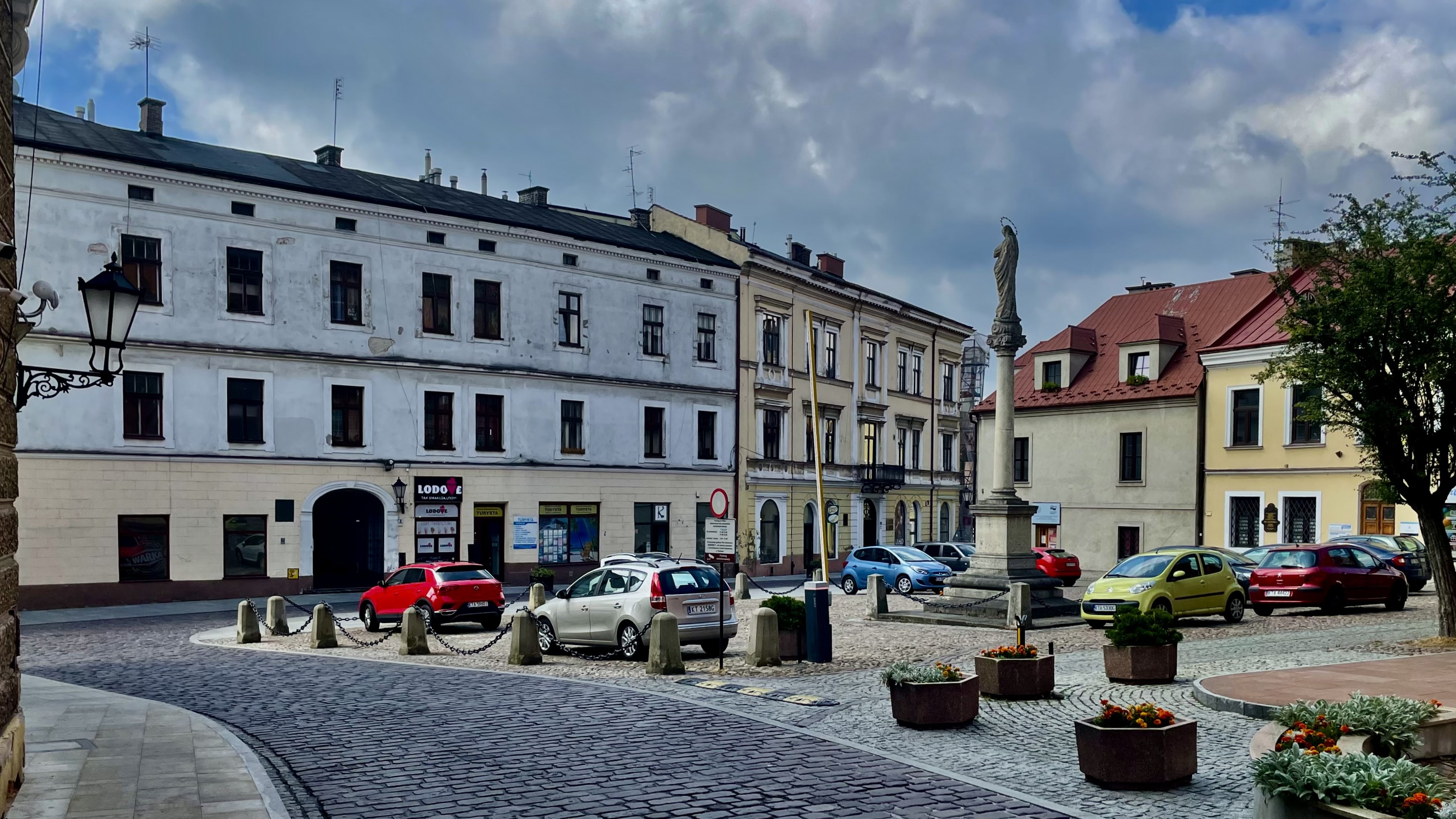
View of the southern part of Cathedral Square

== Location ==
Cathedral Square is situated in Tarnów's Old Town between Katedralna Street and Kapitulna Street, bordered to the southeast by the Market Square. At its center stands the Tarnów Cathedral, alongside the monument to John Paul II and the statue of the Blessed Virgin Mary. The square is surrounded by buildings from the 16th to 20th centuries. Several institutions are based at the square, including the Tarnów Diocesan Museum, the Tarnów branch of Gość Niedzielny, and Biblos Publishing House.

== History ==
=== 14th to 18th centuries ===
The history of Cathedral Square dates to Tarnów's foundation on 7 March 1330, when a church land lot was designated. The area was bounded to the east by a market-adjacent city block, to the south by a main street leading from the Market Square to the Kraków Gate (now Katedralna Street), and to the west and north by the city defensive walls.

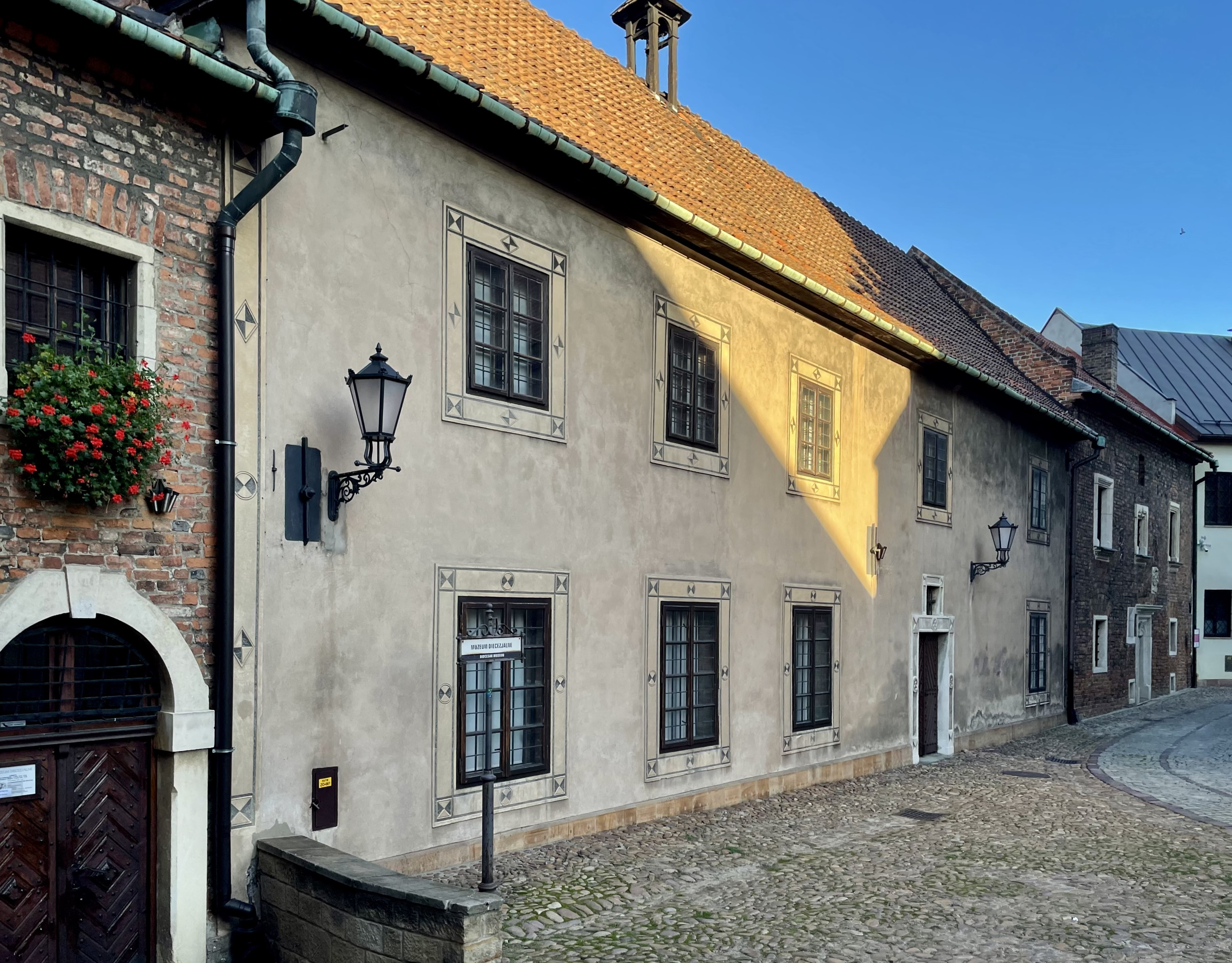
Historic buildings of the Diocesan Museum in the northern part of the square

Soon after the city's foundation, a small parish church and an adjacent cemetery were established at the center of the land lot. The exact extent of the original cemetery is unknown, but archaeological findings confirm it surrounded the church on all sides. Additionally, wooden buildings, likely for residential and parish purposes with rear utility structures, probably began appearing in the northwestern part of the plot.

A parish school likely emerged in the second half of the 14th century, with the first mention in 1413. Its initial building was probably erected in the 14th century. After 1400, when the Tarnów church was elevated to collegiate status, new residential buildings for the canons of the collegiate chapter were needed. Buildings near the collegiate church were documented in 1470 by Jan Długosz. Likely wooden, these structures burned in city fires between 1483 and 1494. In his Liber beneficiorum, Długosz described them as: the provost's house, deemed the city's finest building; the house of the Łukowska prebend; the house of the castle prebend (Blessed Virgin Mary); and the house of the St. Bartholomew prebend.

These houses were likely rebuilt at the turn of the 15th and 16th centuries as masonry structures, including the Łukowska prebend house and the Mikołajowski House, constructed in the early 16th century. Wooden houses began to be replaced with masonry, and non-ecclesiastical buildings developed. The collegiate church, expanded after 15th-century fires, gained the St. Anne chapel and a fully masonry tower. The churchyard cemetery was enhanced with a morgue and a separating wall, as noted in 1597 records. The morgue, placed by the collegiate church's outer wall, stored remains from old burials.

In 1527, with the consent of Tarnów's lord, Jan Tarnowski, the Mikołajowski House became church property, transferred to Tarnów's vicars. In 1555, after Stanisław Białachowski's death, a likely wooden house was purchased by Paweł Łącki. Before 1559, funded by provost Marian Łyczka, the parish school building was rebuilt from wood to masonry. That year, Jan Tarnowski permitted the Tarnów custodian Jan to erect a new masonry building on a plot between the Mikołajowski House and the school.

By the late 16th century, extensive investments created a compact frontage of buildings along the northern and western edges, abutting the city defensive walls. Space constraints led to a reduction in the cemetery's area in the early 16th century for construction. New buildings arose in what is now the square's quadrangular section, with the largest being the psalterists' college house, existing until the late 18th century. Due to dense construction, two passages led from Katedralna Street to the churchyard cemetery gates, located in the western and eastern parts of the modern square. The cemetery was secured by two gates, locked to keep out horses and cattle, as noted in 1780 when repairs were ordered.

City fires in 1617, 1621, and 1663 damaged the square's buildings. A mid-17th-century crisis, including the Swedish Deluge, worsened their condition. Repairs relied on private donations, with limited impact; the only significant project was a modest expansion of the collegiate church. By the 18th century, many previously damaged buildings had fallen into ruin.

=== Late 18th to 20th centuries ===
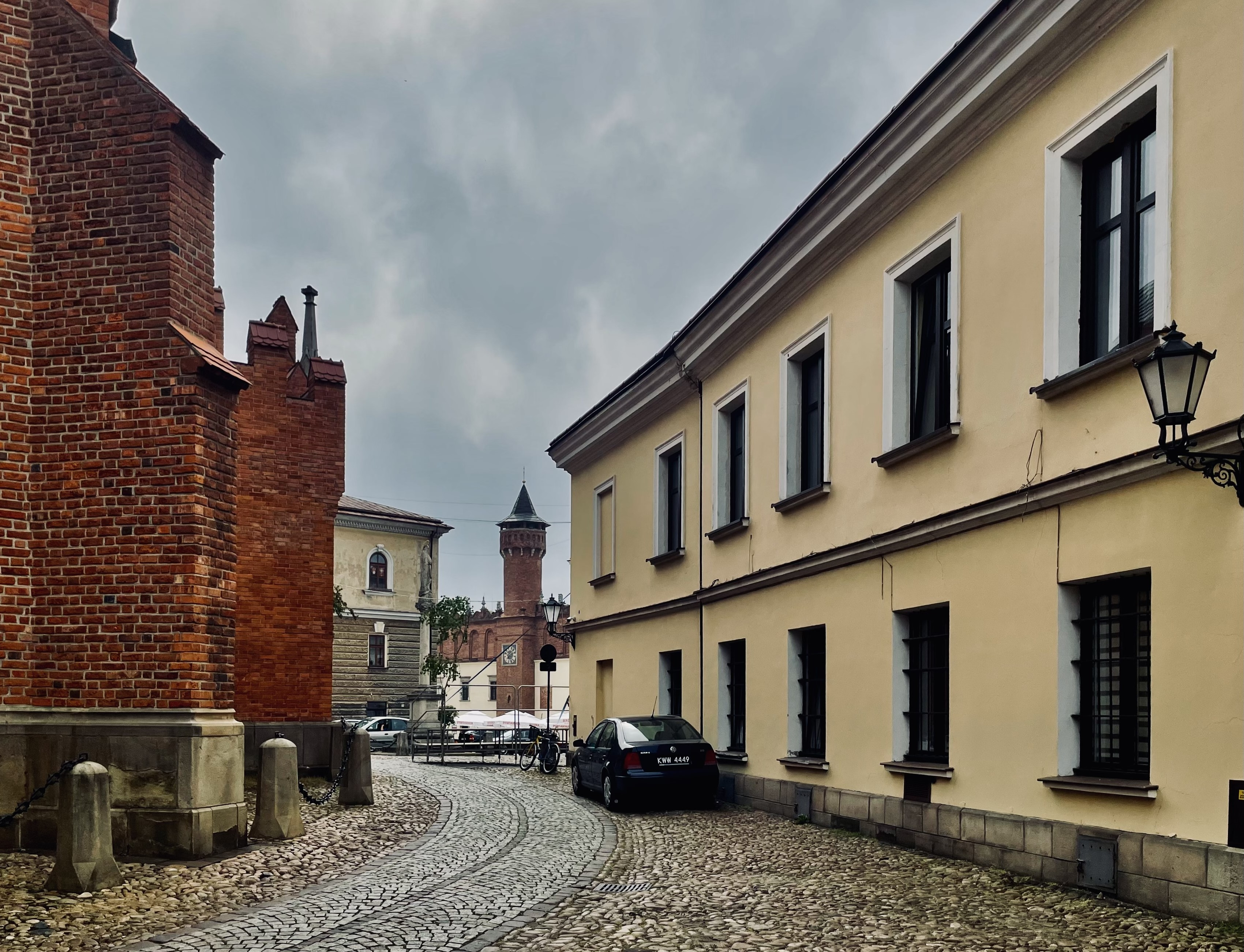
Southern part of the cathedral alley

After Tarnów's annexation by Austria during the First Partition of Poland in 1772, the square's buildings were significantly neglected, requiring urgent repairs.

In 1784, Emperor Joseph II's edict banned burials in city churchyard cemeteries, leading to the collegiate cemetery's closure, likely by the late 1780s. A new cemetery at Zabłocie (now called Old Cemetery) was established around 1790. Local memory of the cemetery persisted, with late 19th-century reports of ghosts haunting the site.

In 1795, church-owned buildings were seized by Austrian authorities for the Religious Fund, undergoing detailed lustration and appraisal. A major issue was the dilapidated, two-story masonry psalterists' college building in the square's southern quadrangular section. Seized in 1786, it was demolished between 1800 and 1803, with its bricks reused for the Zabłocie cemetery wall. In the 1780s, the provost's house, taken from the church, was rebuilt into a three-winged structure, housing the kreishauptman and the Kreis authorities.

The modern southern quadrangular section emerged in the early 19th century after demolishing two dilapidated buildings, their materials used for the Zabłocie cemetery wall. A wooden manor, depicted in a circa 1800 watercolor by Zygmunt Vogel at the junction of the square and Katedralna Street, was replaced by a two-winged tenement. The provost's house (now canonical palace) returned to church ownership and was converted into residences for cathedral chapter canons.

Between 1796 and 1814, a house was added to the market-corner tenement – the only building then in the eastern row – with a high, broken roof. Before 1814, the tenement at 6 Cathedral Square was formed by merging several houses, stretching along the cathedral with its main entrance facing east and a longer wing to the north. Rebuilt extensively from 1818 to at latest 1848, it gained significant size and a separate courtyard. Its facade was later reshaped in the late 19th century. Similarly, the canonical palace received a Renaissance Revival facade.

School buildings were rebuilt in 1810 or between 1814 and 1817. Before 1816, a massive side wing of the corner tenement at 2 Market Square (8 Katedralna Street) was built along the southern row. Noted on an 1848 city plan, it was later rebuilt, losing its stylistic features.

In the late 19th century, a Renaissance Revival or Classicist corner building at Kazimierz Wielki Square, designed by city architect Karol Polityński or Adolf J. Stapf, arose in the southern part. In 1892, per Janusz Rypuszyński's design, two eastern-row buildings, including the market-corner tenement, were merged and rebuilt in Baroque Revival style. Behind it stretched a walled garden reaching Kapitulna Street.

In November 1884, funded by Bishop Józef Alojzy Pukalski, a statue of the Immaculate Conception of the Blessed Virgin Mary was placed in the southern quadrangular section. In the 1890s, during the Gothic Revival reconstruction of the cathedral basilica, the square was paved.

At the turn of the 19th and 20th centuries, Cathedral Square achieved its current architectural form.

=== 20th Century to present ===
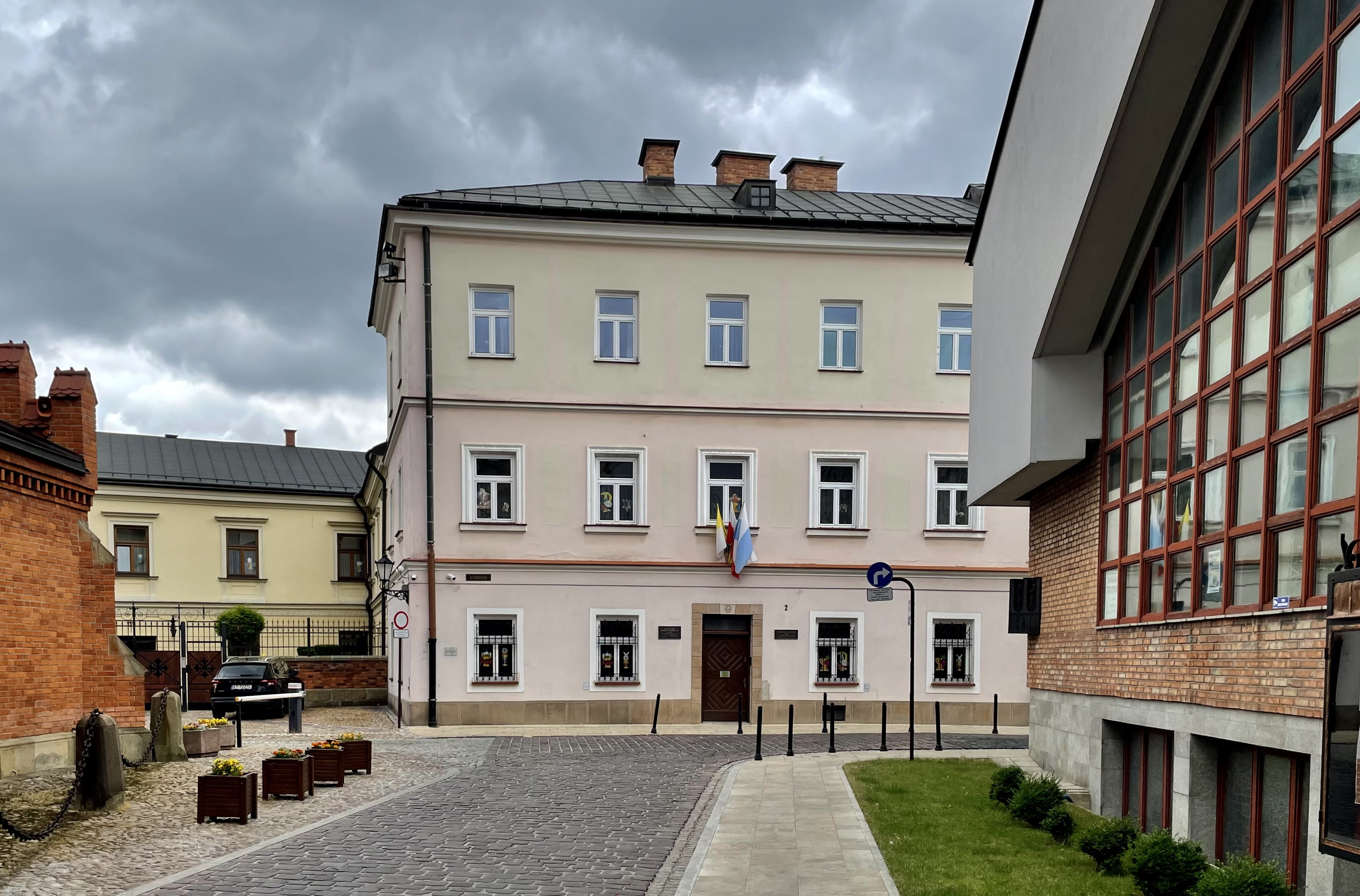
View of the northern part of Cathedral Square

Early 20th-century tenements in the cathedral alley faced demolition due to their poor condition. City authorities planned reconstruction but abandoned the idea in 1903, labeling them "ruins". By 1904, all school institutions had vacated. Intervention by Archduke Franz Ferdinand of Austria and the Commission for the Preservation of Artistic Monuments prevented demolition.

In 1914, the Missionaries House housed the XIV Polish Rifle Squad and Regional Command. During the interwar period, county doctor Maciej Waręda established a County Health Center and Hygiene Museum in the Mikołajowski House.

In 1938, Bishop Franciszek Lisowski purchased cathedral-adjacent buildings to house the Diocesan Museum's collections. During the German occupation in World War II, these buildings hosted the Main Welfare Council and Caritas.

Between 1946 and 1952 (1947–1949, 1948–1952, or 1947–1955, per other sources), cathedral-adjacent buildings were renovated for the Diocesan Museum, with the first exhibition opened in 1950. On 15 July 1952, the City National Council allocated rooms in the tenement at 6 Cathedral Square for the museum's offices, conservation workshop, and storage.

In 1956, a damaged statue of the Blessed Virgin Mary was replaced with a copy, the original moved to Piwniczna-Zdrój on a pedestal at Brzankówka hill. In September 1980, the Tarnów Cathedral was added to the Registry of Cultural Property. On 29 June 1981, initiated by Bishop Jerzy Ablewicz, one of the world's first monuments to John Paul II, designed by Bronisław Chromy, was unveiled in the southern part between a chapel and the cathedral's apse.

Between 1986 and 1987, per Andrzej Skoczek's design, a Pastoral-Catechetical Center was built in the eastern row by the Baroque Revival corner tenement's rear, replacing a former garden. In 1987, during John Paul II's third apostolic visit to Poland, he met with clergy of the Diocese of Tarnów at Cathedral Square and participated in Eucharistic Vespers.

In July 1991, the building complex at 5 Cathedral Square – comprising the Scholasteria, Akademiola, and Mikołajowski House – was added to the immovable monuments register of the former Tarnów Voivodeship. Later, in April 2010, the tenement at 1 Cathedral Square/24 Market Square, and in September 2017, the Missionaries House, were added to the Lesser Poland Voivodeship register.

As of 2023, the square hosts institutions like Biblos Publishing House, the Tarnów branch of Gość Niedzielny, and the Diocesan Museum. The southern section serves as a parking lot for worshippers attending services at the cathedral basilica.

== Architecture ==
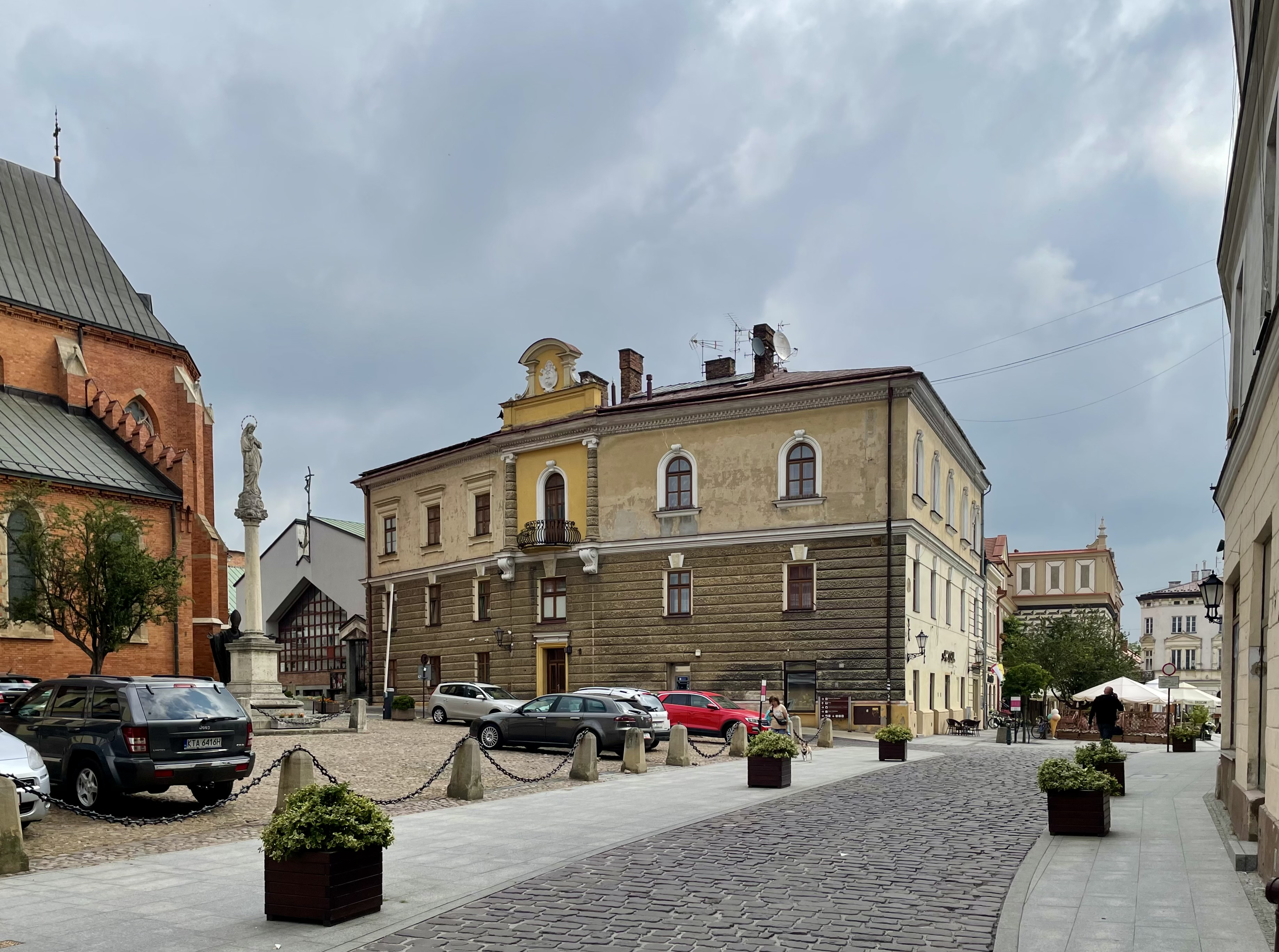
View of the southeastern part of the square toward the Market Square

=== Description of the square ===
Cathedral Square comprises two main parts: a cathedral alley, formerly a churchyard cemetery, encircling the basilica, and a quadrangular plaza, formed later, south of the church where tenements were demolished. Kapitulna Street extends from the alley, while Katedralna Street branches from the quadrangular section adjacent to the Market Square.

==== Cathedral alley ====
The cathedral alley serves as a passageway around the basilica. To the east, it is bounded by the modern Pastoral-Catechetical Center (corner with Kapitulna Street). To the north lie the Canonical Palace, Capital House (Kanonia II), and Misionaries House. To the west, it is enclosed by the Mikołajowski House, Akademiola, and Scholasteria. To the south, the tenement at 6 Cathedral Square borders it. The basilica stands at the center. Some historic buildings in the alley, known as "old houses behind the cathedral", house exhibition halls of the Diocesan Museum.

==== Southern part of the square ====
The southern part emerged in the early 19th century after demolishing tenements, with their basements preserved. It now functions as a parking lot. It hosts the statue of the Blessed Virgin Mary and monument to John Paul II. To the south, it is bounded by 19th-century tenements at 2 and 8 Katedralna Street (corner with Kazimierz Wielki Square, and the corner with Market Square). The cathedral basilica lies to the north, with 18th–19th-century tenements at 6 and 7 Cathedral Square to the west and a 16th–19th-century tenement at 1 Cathedral Square (market corner) to the east.

=== Buildings at the square ===
==== Historic buildings ====
- Tarnów Cathedral – 14th century (register no. A-228, 25 September 1980)
- Tenement at 1 Cathedral Square/24 Market Square – 16th–19th centuries (register no. A-1204/M, 22 April 2010)
- Scholasteria, also rector's house – 16th century (register no. A-338, 18 July 1991)
- Akademiola – 16th century (register no. A-338, 18 July 1991)
- Mikołajowski House – 16th century (register no. A-338, 18 July 1991)
- Missionaries House, also Kanonia I – 18th century (register no. A-1477/M, 13 September 2017)

==== Other buildings ====
- Pastoral-Catechetical Center – built 1986–1987
- Tenement at 2 Katedralna Street/1 Kazimierz Wielki Square – 19th century
- Tenement at 6 Cathedral Square – 18th–19th centuries
- Tenement at 7 Cathedral Square (1 Katedralna Street) – 19th century
- Tenement at 8 Katedralna Street/2 Market Square – 19th–20th centuries
- Capital House, also Kanonia II – 18th century
- Canonical Palace (provost's or suffragan's house) – 14th–19th centuries

==== Monuments ====
- Statue of the Blessed Virgin Mary – erected 1884
- Monument to John Paul II – erected 1981
