= Vyshnivetsky Palace =

Building in Ternopil Oblast, Ukraine

- Палац Вишневецьких
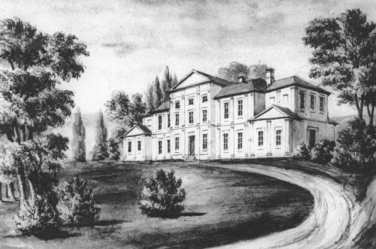
- Vyshnivetsky Palace in the drawing by Napoleon Orda

General information
- Location: Chaichyntsi, Kremenets Raion, Ternopil Oblast, Ukraine
- Coordinates: 49°51′20″N 25°52′25″E

Vyshnivetsky Palace (Ukrainian: Палац Вишневецьких) is a lost historic building in Chaichyntsi of the Borsuky rural hromada of the Kremenets Raion of Ternopil Oblast.

== History ==
The summer palace was built by Kniaz Michał Wiśniowiecki for his wife Tekla of Radziwiłł, in whose honor Chaichyntsi was called Teklopol for some time.

== Description ==
The structure of the palace is similar to the Sanguszko Palace in Iziaslav, built in 1746–1757 by Paolo Fontana. The similarity with the Iziaslav Palace lies in the massing of the building both in the front and side views. The central, highest part, framed by a magnificent order, increased the monumentality of the building. The lowest corner elements did not protrude, like the pavilion-arches in Vyshnivets, but were pressed into the higher parts of the palace. The palace was destroyed during World War I.
