= Chaichyntsi =

Rural locality in Ternopil Oblast, Ukraine

Chaichyntsi Чайчинці
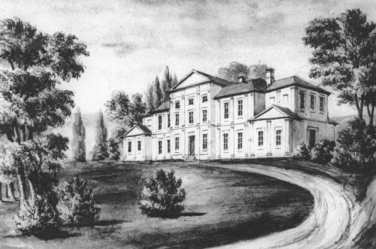
- Chaichyntsi Palace

- Location in Ternopil Oblast
- Coordinates: 49°51′20″N 25°52′25″E
- Country: Ukraine
- Oblast: Ternopil Oblast
- Raion: Kremenets Raion
- Hromada: Borsuky rural hromada
- Time zone: UTC+2 (EET)
  - Summer (DST): UTC+3 (EEST)
- Postal code: 47414

Chaichyntsi (Ukrainian: Чайчинці) is a village in the Borsuky rural hromada of the Kremenets Raion of Ternopil Oblast in Ukraine.

== History ==
The first written mention of the village was in 1460.

After the liquidation of the Lanivtsi Raion on 19 July 2020, the village became part of the Kremenets Raion.

== Religion ==
- Church of the Exaltation of the Holy Cross (1776, wooden).

== Monuments ==
- Vyshnivetsky Palace (18th century, built by Michał Serwacy Wiśniowiecki; destroyed).

== Sources ==
- (in Ukrainian) Басюк Г., Ковальков Ю., Чайчинці // Ternopil Encyclopedic Dictionary: in 4 v. / editorial board: H. Yavorskyi and other, Ternopil: "Zbruch", 2008, V. 3: П—Я, S. 583. — ISBN 978-966-528-279-2.
- "Czajczyńce, wś, powiat krzemieniecki". Geographical Dictionary of the Kingdom of Poland (in Polish). 1. Warszawa: Kasa im. Józefa Mianowskiego. 1880. p. 729.
- "Czajczyńce, wś, powiat krzemieniecki, gmina Werbowiec". Geographical Dictionary of the Kingdom of Poland (in Polish). p. 347.
