= Sanguszko Palace =

18th-century palace in Poland

- Pałac Sanguszków w Tarnowie
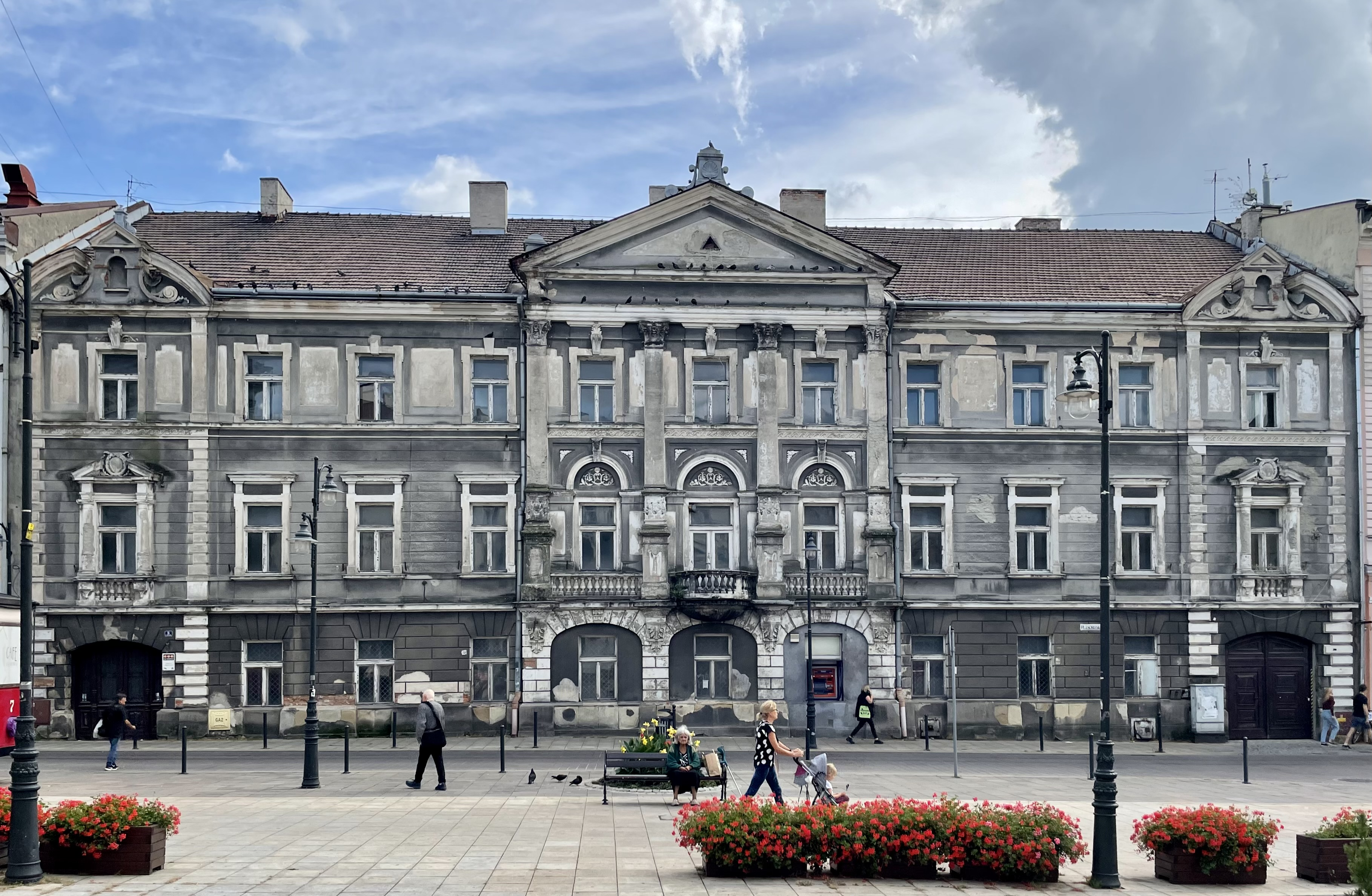
- Facade of the building
- Alternative names: Tarnów County Office Building; Princely House

General information
- Type: palace
- Architectural style: Baroque, later Classicism and Baroque Revival
- Address: 5 Jan Sobieski Avenue
- Town or city: Tarnów
- Country: Poland
- Coordinates: 50°00′42.588″N 20°59′06.792″E
- Completed: second half of the 18th century

Technical details
- Floor area: main building – 1,560 m^{2} (16,800 sq ft) annex – 120 m^{2} (1,300 sq ft)

Sanguszko Palace (also known as Tarnów County Office Building or Princely House) is a palace located at Jan Sobieski Square in Tarnów, Poland. It was constructed at the end of the 18th century, with its current form established in the first half of the 20th century. Over the centuries, it has served various purposes, including residential and administrative functions, housing offices such as the Austrian and Polish county starostwo and the voivodeship office of the Tarnów Voivodeship. During the Galician Peasant Uprising of 1846, victims of the massacre were deposited in front of the building, and the then-Tarnów starosta paid peasants a "reward" for their loyalty to the Austrian emperor. Due to its administrative role, it is commonly known as the county office building.

== Location ==
The building is situated in the center of Tarnów, outside the city walls, beyond the former Kraków Gate, in an area historically known as Kraków Suburb or Great Suburb. It is located on the southern side of Jan Sobieski Square, at number 5.

== History ==
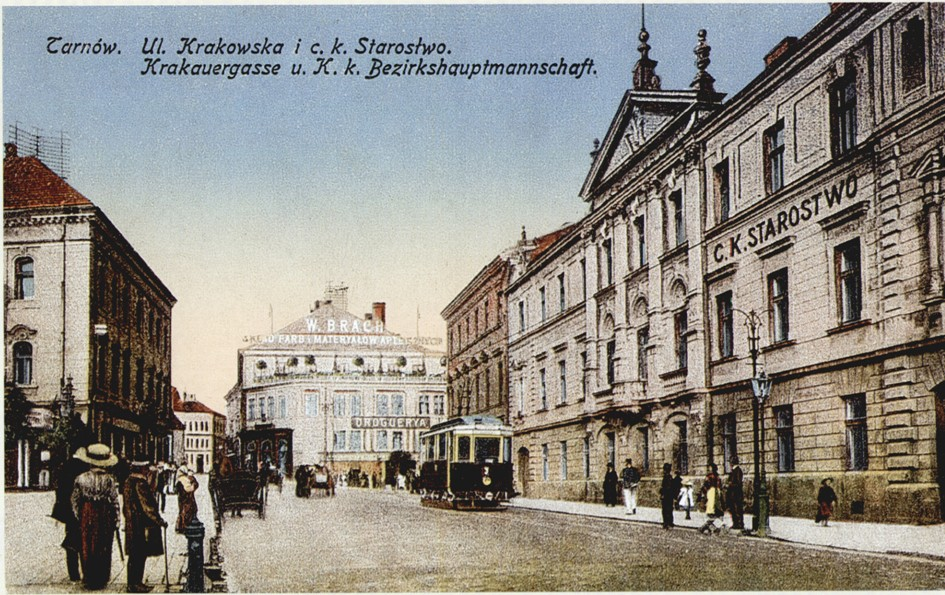
Austrian-era postcard of the building

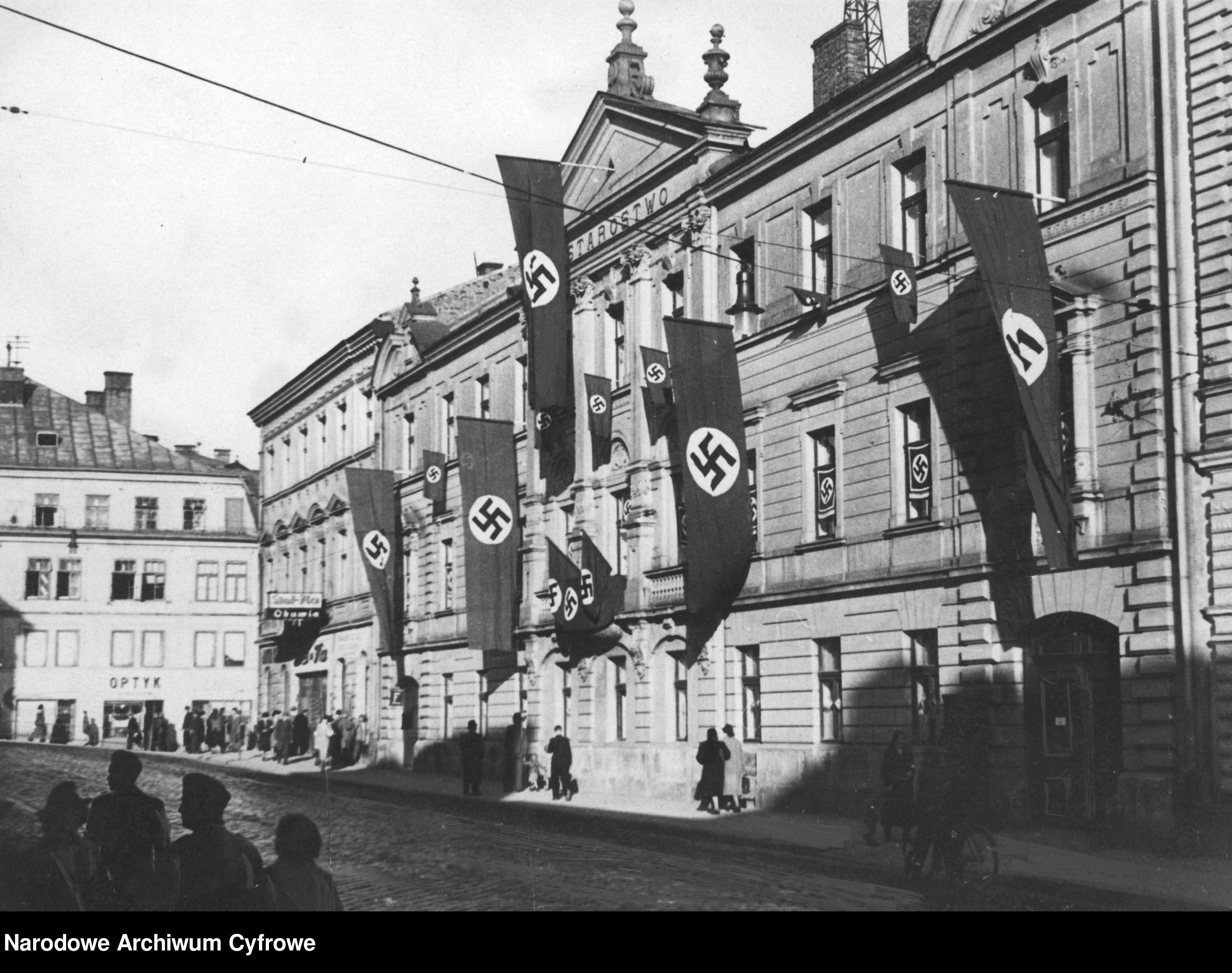
The building during World War II, decorated for the anniversary of Adolf Hitler's birth

Originally, plot number 5 housed a wooden inn owned by the Sanguszko princes. The Baroque palace building was erected between 1785 and 1796 or by 1799, at the initiative of the then-owner of the city, Hieronim Janusz Sanguszko. Set back slightly from the road, it was a two-winged structure, with freestanding outbuildings and likely stables within the plot. On a 1796 city plan, it was marked as the "Princely House" (German: Fürst Haus), and in the inventory of the Tarnów County, it was listed as "a new stone house in Kraków Suburb, built with a façade and the cipher of His Serene Highness".

The building served as a magnate residence. Prince Hieronim Sanguszko took up permanent residence there from 1798. In the early 19th century, his son, Prince Eustachy Sanguszko, sold it to Austrian authorities, who established it as the seat of the Kreis in 1825, the district, and from 1867, the county.

In 1836, the Tarnów starosta Joseph Breinl von Wallerstern resided in the palace. In February 1846, aware of preparations for the Kraków Uprising, Breinl summoned village heads to the palace, urging them to oppose the nobility and all enemies of the empire. During the Galician Peasant Uprising, peasants brought victims of the massacre (approximately 150) to the adjacent square and delivered captured Kraków insurgents to Austrian authorities. Starosta Breinl also met with the peasant leader Jakub Szela there and paid the peasants 4,000 Rhenish guilders as a "reward for loyalty to the emperor".

The building underwent at least two renovations in the 19th century. Before 1831, under the management of the Tarnów Starostwo, it was given Classical features with a multi-axis façade and a spacious central hall. A renovation in 1870 disrupted these Classical forms. Around 1900 or 1901, it was remodeled again, primarily the façade, which was given a Baroque Revival appearance. In the 20th century, under Austrian orders and based on a design by Szczęsny Zaręba, Tarnów's director of municipal construction, the building's style was unified to match contemporary aesthetics.

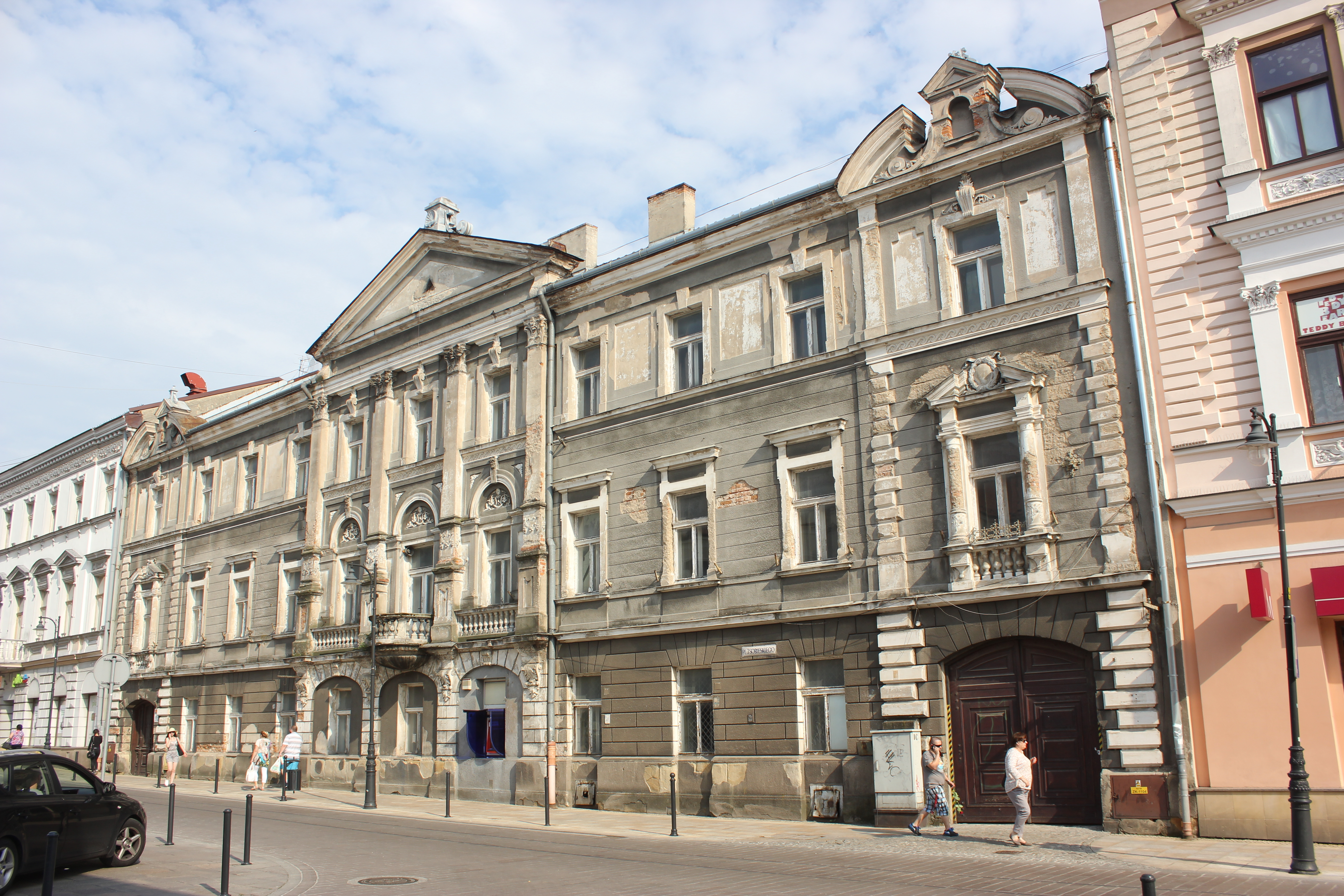
View of the palace in 2018

During Austrian rule, the building was one of Tarnów's most significant public structures, hosting meetings with residents, including governors and archdukes.

On 31 October 1918, members of the Self-Defense Committee seized the palace, forcing the Austrian starosta to swear allegiance to the Polish government. From 1918 to 1939, it housed the county starostwo, and during World War II, it served as a seat for German occupation authorities. After the war until 1975, it again housed county authorities as the County National Council. From then until 1990, it served as the seat of departments of the voivodeship office of the Tarnów Voivodeship. Between 1990 and 1998, it was a district office. Since 2004 or 2005, the building has been privately owned and unused.

In 2003, it was entered into the register of immovable monuments of the Lesser Poland Voivodeship (register number A-12/M, dated 12 December 2003).

== Architecture ==
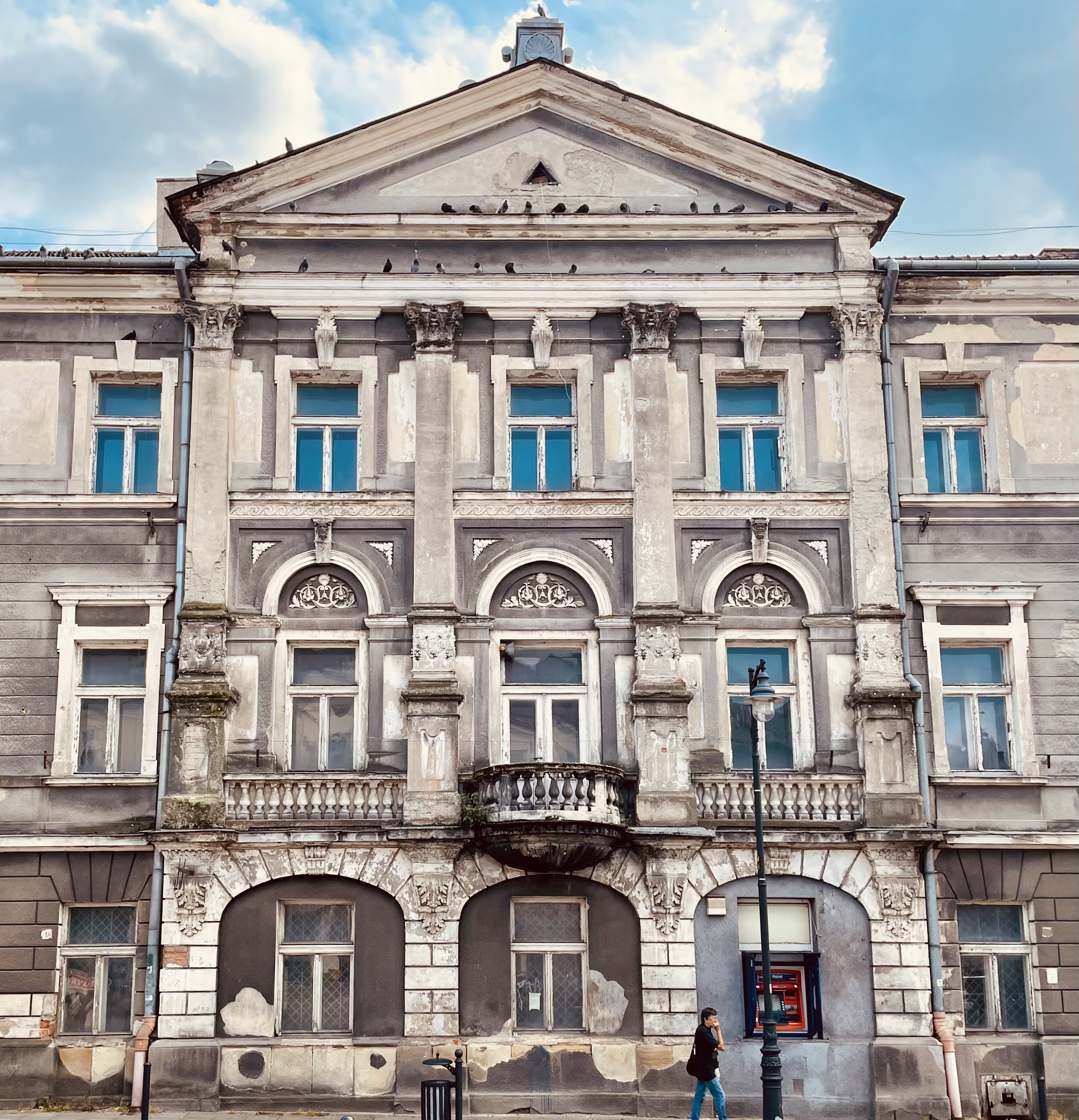
Central avant-corps of the façade

=== Main building ===
The building was constructed on a rectangular plan with external avant-corps on the rear elevation and a rectangular eastern side wing. The three-story main structure and two-story rear wing are covered with a gable roof. A two-story connector links the main body and the rear wing. Built of brick and plastered, it sits on a socle of sandstone coated with cement and is partially basemented. The interior layout is double-bay.

The façade is ten-axis, with three slightly pronounced avant-corps at the center and ends. The central three-axis avant-corps features near-square blind arches with segmental arches, containing rectangular windows. The ground floor, including the side avant-corps, is clad in faux rustication; the rustication on the corners of the single-axis avant-corps is more prominent and extends to the second floor. A cordon cornice, corbelled above the gate keystones and in the central avant-corps, separates the ground floor from the first floor. A semicircular balcony with stone balusters is positioned on the first floor's central axis. Above it, on the second and third floors, pilasters in the grand order visually support a tympanum. The side avant-corps contain entrances: the western one leads to a carriageway hall, basement, and side stairs, while the eastern one accesses the stairwell and hall.

The rear façade is also ten-axis, articulated by prominent external avant-corps. Long balconies with iron balustrades supported by iron corbels span the second and third floors. The wall in the connector between the main body and annex is partially filled with glass bricks.

Ground-floor rooms feature barrel vaulting with lunettes (showing modification traces), barrel vaults, and groin vaulting. The ribs in the vestibule use segmental vaulting, while Klein ceilings with infill are above the stairs. Higher floors have wooden beam ceilings with underceiling. The timber roof truss is post-and-beam, and the gable roof is clad with tiles and, in the rear wing, metal. Double chimneys line the roof. Floors are parquet, with concrete in utility rooms. The carriageway hall has oak block paving, the entrance hall features decorative ceramic tiles signed "Michał Mikoś // Tarnów", and the gate passage is paved with wooden blocks.

The building includes water and sewage, electrical, lightning protection, telephone, and central heating systems. It has a usable area of 1,560 m² and a volume of 15,600 m³.

=== Annex ===
The palace includes a single-story brick annex, single-tract and six-axis, built on a rectangular plan with a diagonally truncated southern gabled wall. It has a small basement with barrel vaulting. An asymmetrically placed glazed porch with vertically boarded walls in a frame structure adorns the front elevation. The façade is smooth, with rectangular doors in the southern section, capped by a modest cornice.

Floors are parquet or white planks, with ceramic tiles and colored glass in the porch. Windows are casement, rectangular. The timber roof truss is post-and-beam, reinforced with low-set brackets. The shed roof with a knee wall is covered with eternit, while the porch has a gable roof.

The outbuilding has a usable area of 120 m² and a volume of 350 m³.
