= City walls of Tarnów =

Former defensive structure in Tarnów, Poland

Tarnów city fortifications complex
- Zespół fortyfikacji miejskich Tarnowa
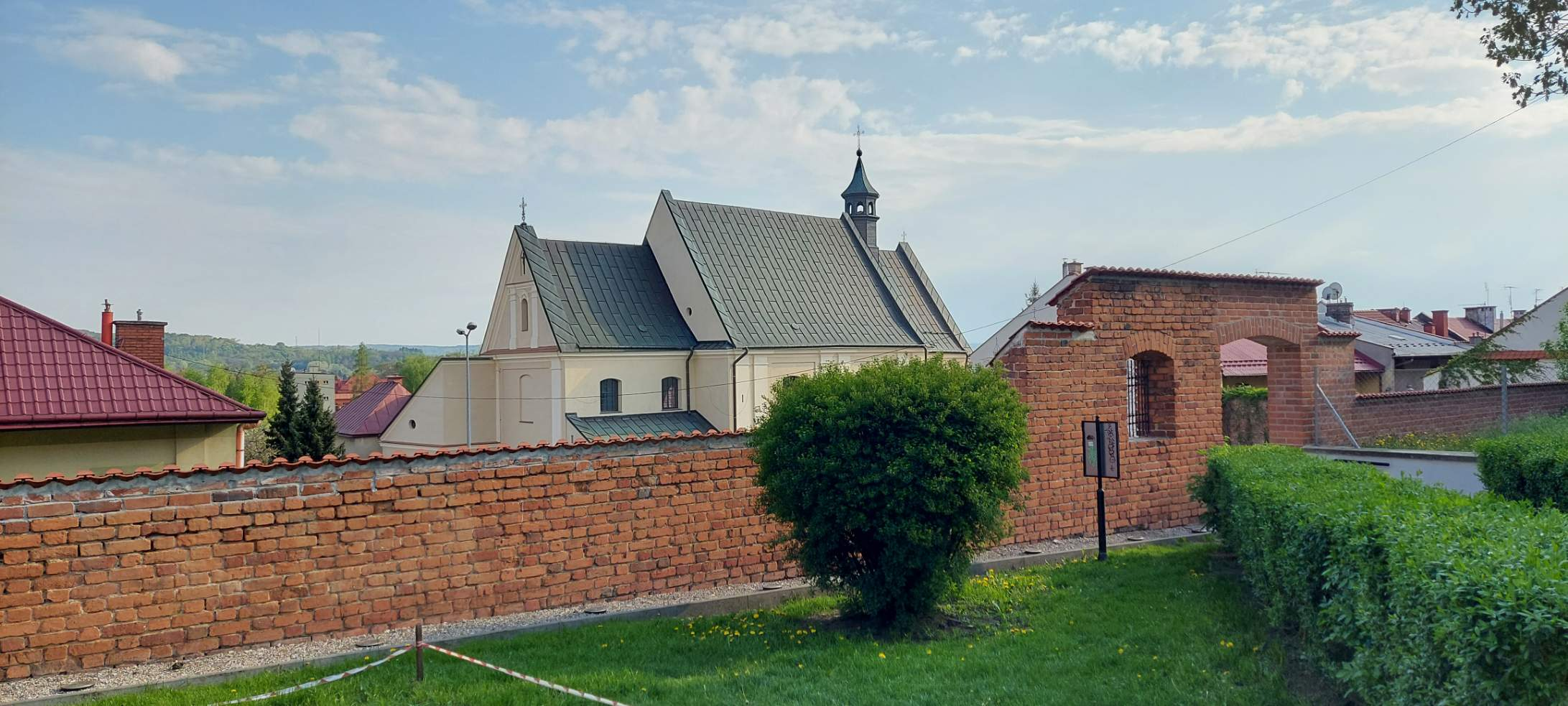
- Preserved section of the walls with a postern on Bernardyńska Street
- Interactive map of the Tarnów city fortifications complex area

General information
- Location: Brama Pilźnieńska, Rybna, Targowa, Wałowa, Wąska streets, Tarnów, Poland
- Coordinates: 50°00′49.8″N 20°59′16.8″E
- Completed: 14th–16th century

Tarnów city walls were a defensive structure consisting of a continuous wall with fortifications such as fortified towers, bastions, and city gates, once surrounding the town (now part of the Old Town). The fortifications were likely built in the 14th century and underwent multiple expansions and modernizations, particularly in the 16th century.

By the 18th century, due to a period of economic decline, the outdated fortifications fell into disrepair, leading to their dismantling. The demolition process began around 1790 and was completed in the early 19th century. Today, only short sections of the former defensive walls remain.

== History ==
=== Origins ===
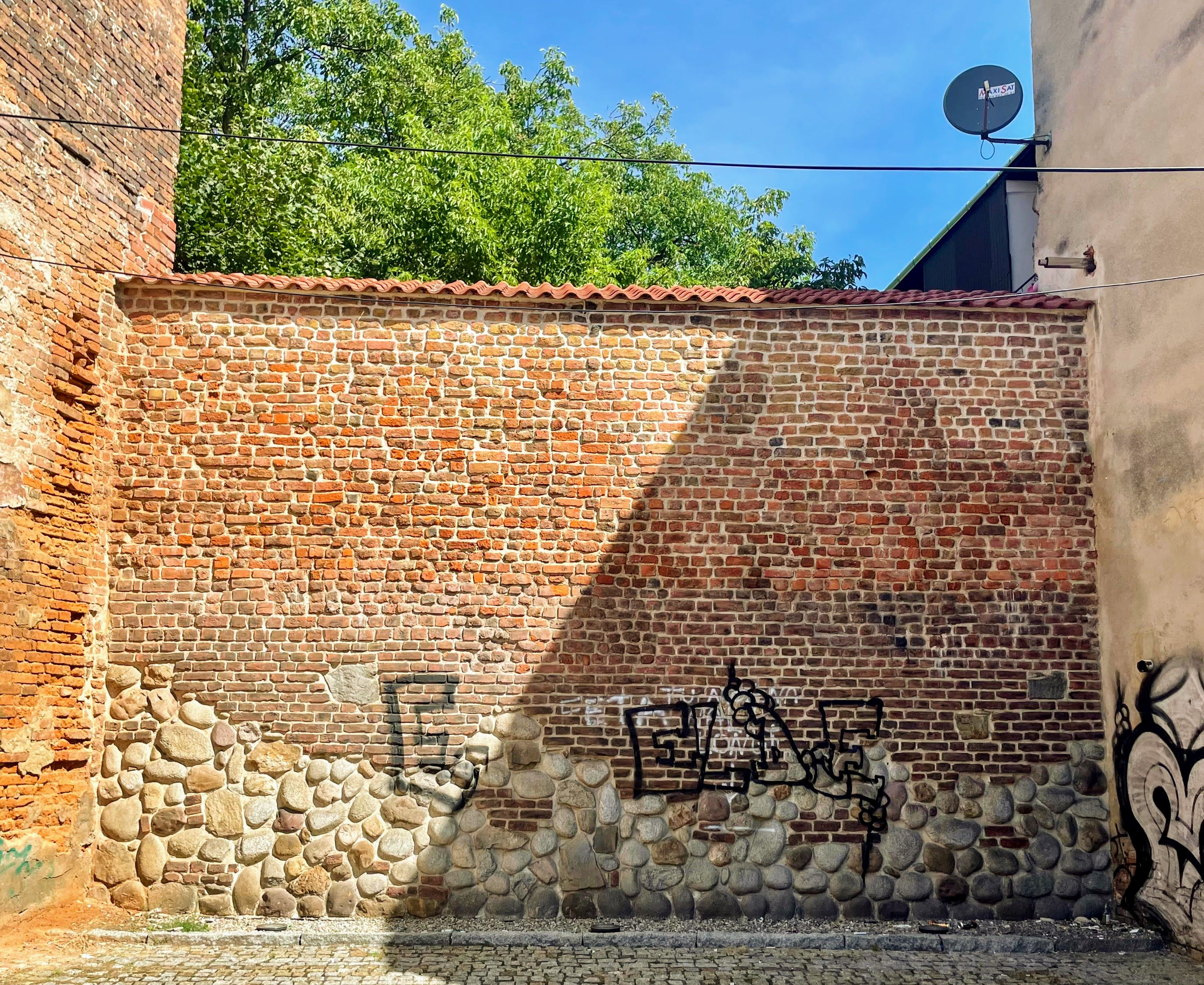
Fragment of the wall near Taras Street

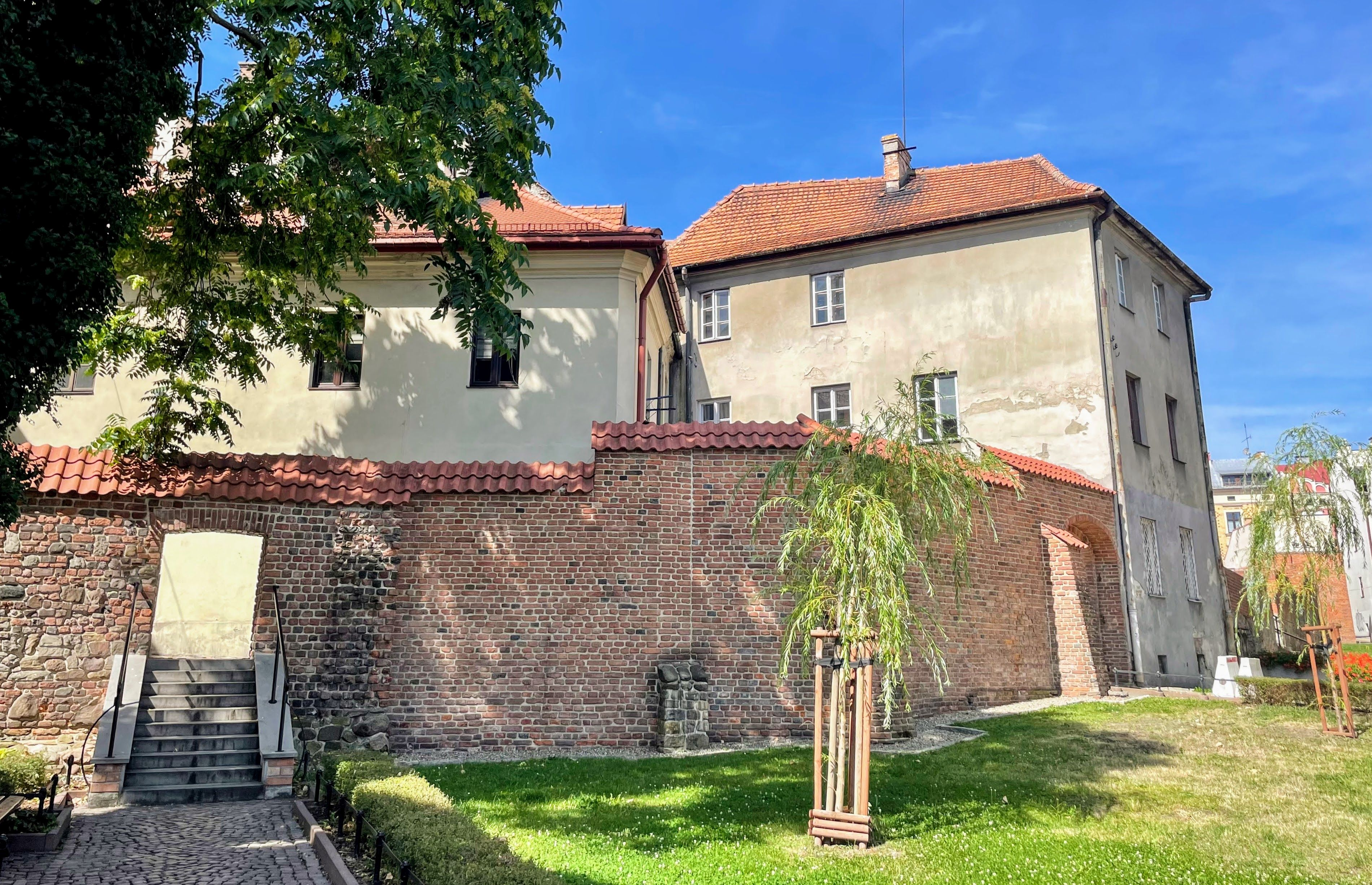
Fragment of the city walls near the statue of Józef Bem

The city walls of Tarnów were likely built shortly after the town's foundation, probably before the mid-14th century. The age of the walls is confirmed by the size of the bricks found in the oldest preserved sections, which differ from later elements. Given their age, these masonry fortifications were probably the town's original defenses. According to Józef Edward Dutkiewicz, the city's fortifications may have been funded by Spycimir Leliwita, the town's owner at the time.

The first written reference to Tarnów's city walls dates back to 1448 when they were already described as long-standing. In the second half of the 15th century, the fortifications were expanded to accommodate firearms and possibly in response to the Hungarian invasion, during which the town was devastated. The enhancements included the addition of an earthen rampart, though it likely did not encircle the entire defensive system. It may have begun near the Pilzno Gate and extended to the Kraków Gate or Wielkie Schody Street, covering the northern and possibly part of the southern section of the fortifications.

It is also probable that the construction of the rampart led to the addition of new posterns, partial reconstruction of some towers, and modifications to the wall's parapet. A path between the rampart and the wall emerged, which later developed into a street within the defensive corridor. The fortifications were likely not expanded on the eastern and southern sides due to the natural terrain, which included steep slopes reinforced by a water-filled moat and the former bed of the Wątok stream, providing strong defensive advantages.

Between 1468 and the late 15th or early 16th century, the southeastern section of the fortifications was further reinforced by the addition of the Bernardine monastery complex. This complex, surrounded by its own fortifications, was attached to the corner of the city walls and enabled flanking defense of sections lacking a rampart.

=== 16th and 17th centuries ===
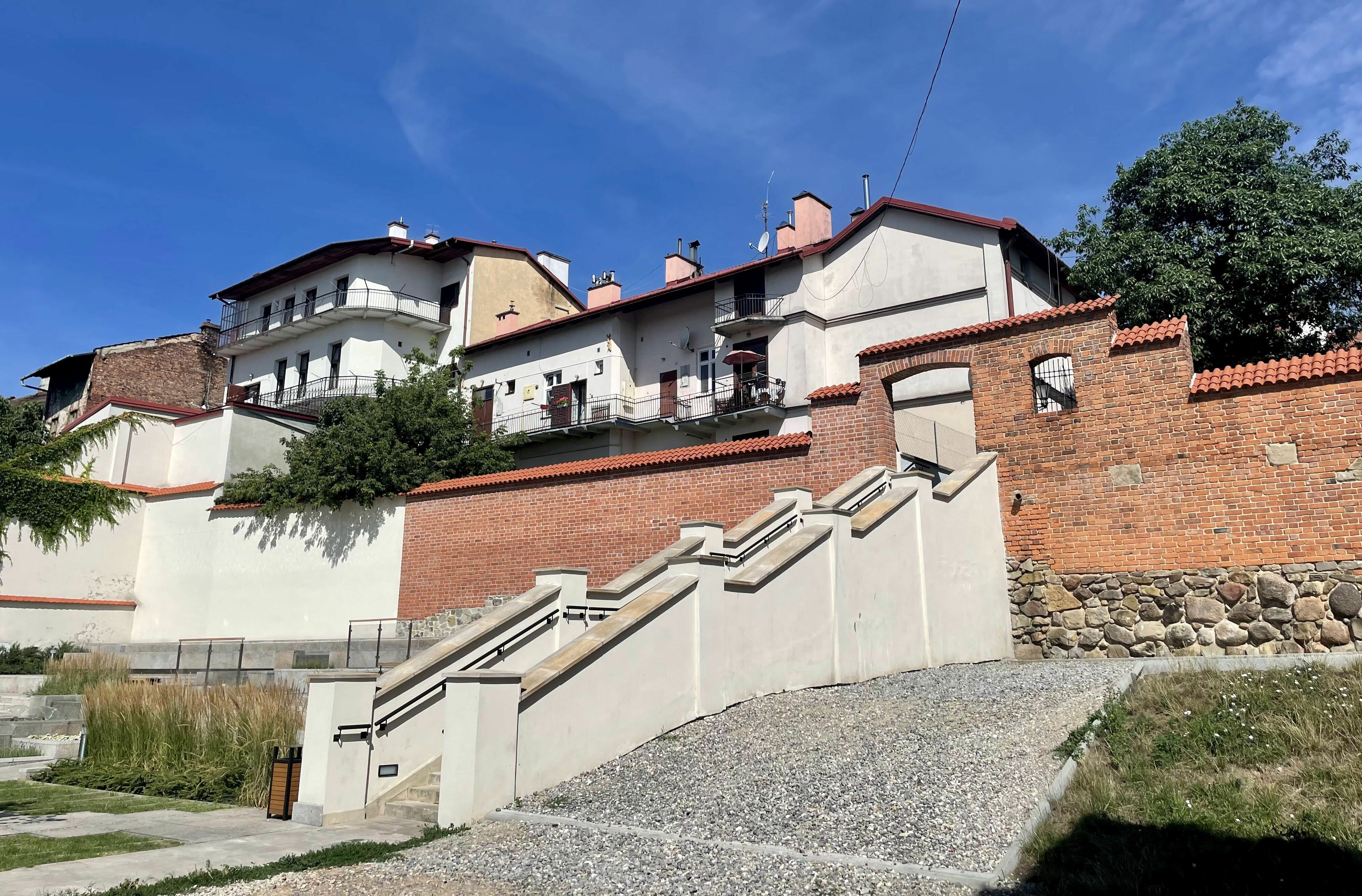
City walls and the Małe Schody Gate

The entire defensive system of the city was rebuilt between 1513 and 1544 during a period of increasing fear of Turkish aggression. From 1514, the works were co-financed and supervised by Jan Tarnowski – the then owner of Tarnów, an outstanding expert in the art of fortification. The expansion of the walls included, among other things, doubling their line by constructing an outer wall along the present-day Wałowa Street and probably Targowa Street, and reinforcing it with five towers or bastion towers. The construction of the outer wall was also due to the development of urban buildings. During this time, the Kraków Gate (1521) and the Pilzno Gate (1519) were also rebuilt.

In 1520, part of the outer wall collapsed due to water erosion, and a section of it was rebuilt from scratch. At the same time, the northern section of the inner wall was reconstructed, presumably modifying the defensive devices and embrasures, and in some places, the wall was also refaced. Later, in the 1530s, the southern section of the wall was further strengthened and, in some places, completely rebuilt. Simultaneously, the water-filled moat was also expanded. From 1544, no further construction expenses appeared in the municipal records; however, from 1537, expenses for saltpeter and gunpowder began to appear, indicating that the completed sections of the fortifications were being armed. The expansion of the defensive system was financed by the city council using funds provided by the city's owners and, partly, probably from the municipal treasury.

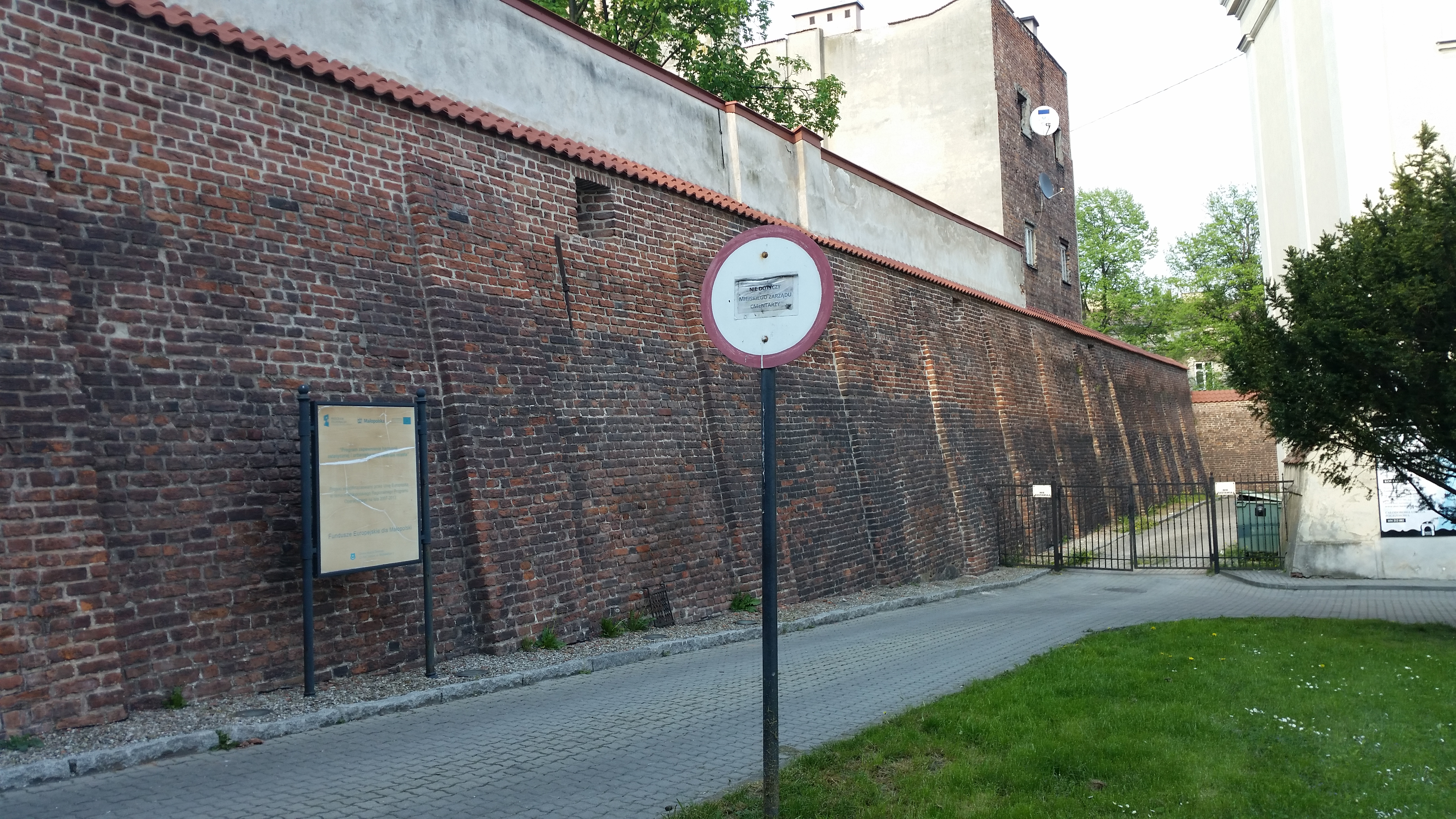
Wall on Szeroka Street

In connection with the construction of the walls, the city council organized a significant construction support base. The municipal brickyard continuously produced bricks during the construction, and if there was a greater demand, temporary brick production sites were organized. Fieldstones used for the lower parts of the walls were brought to the city from nearby villages; similarly, blocks of Ciężkowice sandstone were transported and quarried in the nearby village of Skrzyszów. The construction work was carried out by several contractors, some of whom were brought in from outside the city.

It is presumed that individual sections of the walls, along with their defensive infrastructure, were assigned to city corporations. However, information about these assignments, as well as the names of the towers derived from them (except for one mention of the drapers' tower), has not survived to the present day.

As a result of the 16th-century expansion, Tarnów's defensive system was significantly strengthened. The city fortifications consisted of a total of 9 or 10 towers or bastions, 4 city gates (2 main and 2 so-called smaller ones), and an unspecified number of fortified city gates (probably around 10). Thanks to the modernization of the defensive system, Tarnów was one of the most heavily fortified cities in southern Poland at that time.

At the end of the 16th century, when the city came into the hands of the Ostrogski family, the fortifications were maintained in good condition and preserved at the command of the new owners. Between 1567 and 1569 and between 1574 and 1576, part of the city's income was allocated for the repair and maintenance of the walls. In the first half of the 17th century, the city financed the repairs of the fortifications itself. At the same time, efforts were made to maintain the armaments of the fortifications in good condition, and in 1620, two cannons were placed in the Bernardine monastery.

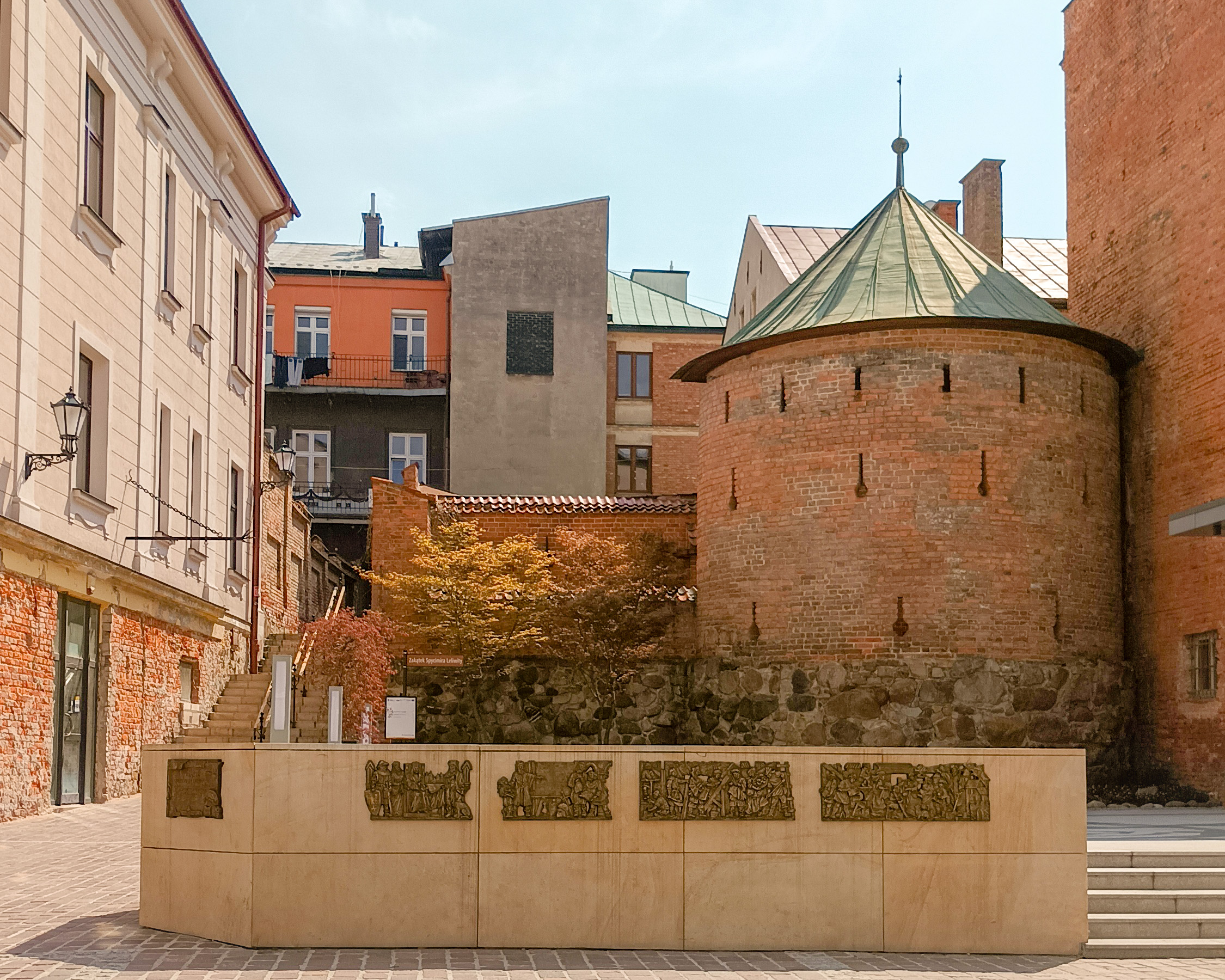
View of the square with a 16th-century bastion

In 1644, the image of Tarnów's city walls appeared on a drawing of the Tarnowski family's family tree. The illustration presented a panorama of the city from the south, showing a city gate located in a tower and two lines of battlement walls; however, this depiction is not entirely reliable. Between 1648 and 1651, further major works were carried out on Tarnów's fortifications when, by the decision of Prince Władysław Dominik Zasławski, the city authorities were obliged to repair the walls, and the inhabitants of the Tarnów County were tasked with building ramparts. The extent of these works is unknown, but it is presumed that no new structures were added to the existing fortifications. These efforts were made due to concerns about the Cossack uprising in Ukraine.

In 1655, the Swedes reached Tarnów and, finding the gates open, forced the city to pay tribute. In the same year, the fortifications prevented marauding troops of the quarter army from breaking into the city and looting it. Shortly afterward, however, Swedish troops entered the city once again, demanding tribute and plundering the city.

=== Decline ===
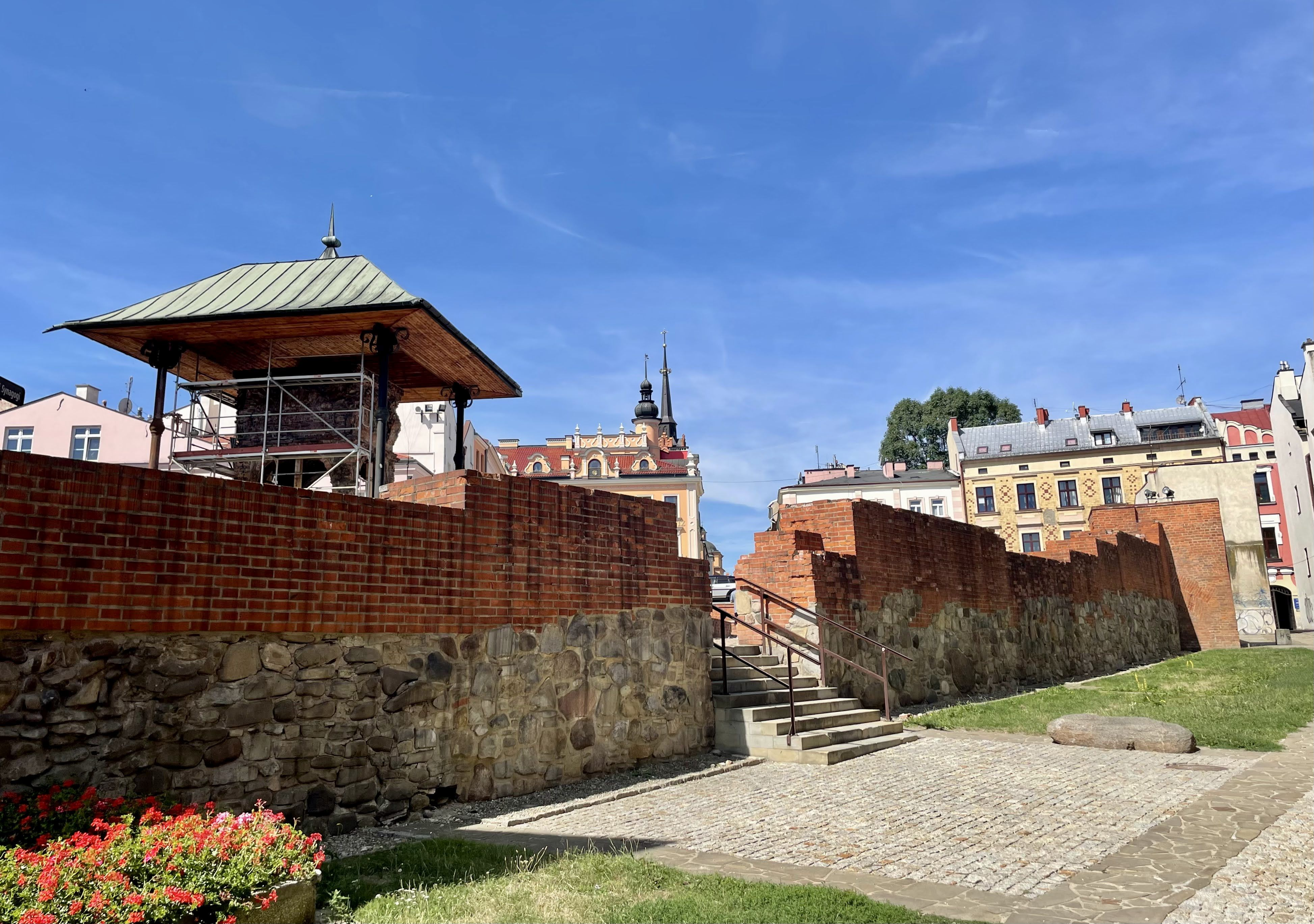
Fragments of the walls near Wąska Street

At least until the end of the 17th century, efforts were made to maintain the fortifications in good condition, but the continued expansion of suburban areas and the city worked against the defensive systems. With the growth of the city from the 16th century, the city walls began to be built over, with these actions starting near the inner walls by the Tarnów Cathedral (although, for example, the Mikołajowski House located there had a corridor providing access to the walls, as requested by the city authorities). Over the years, this practice increased, and the city's owners tried to oppose it, though it is unclear with what success. Parts of Podmurna Street were also built over, which had been intended to provide free access to the walls. By the end of the 17th century, the Tarnów defensive system, in light of the rapid development of military technology, had become outdated. The last repair work on the city fortifications was recorded in the 1680s, when the burned coverings of the walls and defensive embankments were repaired.

As a result of the 18th-century crisis, the repair and maintenance of the outdated fortifications were definitively abandoned. According to a 1754 lustration, the Tarnów fortifications were in very poor condition and no longer suitable for defensive purposes. After the First Partition of Poland, the Austrian authorities ordered the dismantling of the former defensive system. However, before that, the ruins of the former fortifications were likely used as a source of building material. On the Austrian military map (the so-called Miega map) from between 1779 and 1781, four towers on the northern section of the wall were recorded, indicating that the remaining ones must have already been dismantled. The ramparts and moats were leveled, creating new streets: Wałowa Street (called Podwale Street at that time) between 1784 and 1785, followed by Targowa, Szeroka, and Bernardyńska streets a little later.

After 1790, a planned demolition of the useless ruins began, as they were hindering the city's development. Part of the inner wall, most of the outer wall, and the remains of the towers were demolished. Only a short section of the outer wall with a preserved bastion remains to this day; the inner walls were left standing at full height in some places. Two towers also survived along the inner wall. At the end of the 18th century, the remnants of the Tarnów fortifications were immortalized by Zygmunt Vogel. In one of his drawings, he depicted a bastion with a bastion tower, and in another, one of the existing bastions. The undemolished remains of the fortifications were either covered up or absorbed by new buildings. Following the land subdivision and sale of the former fortification areas in 1836, the process of demolition and construction of new buildings accelerated significantly. The planned demolition of the former defensive walls was completed at the beginning of the 19th century.

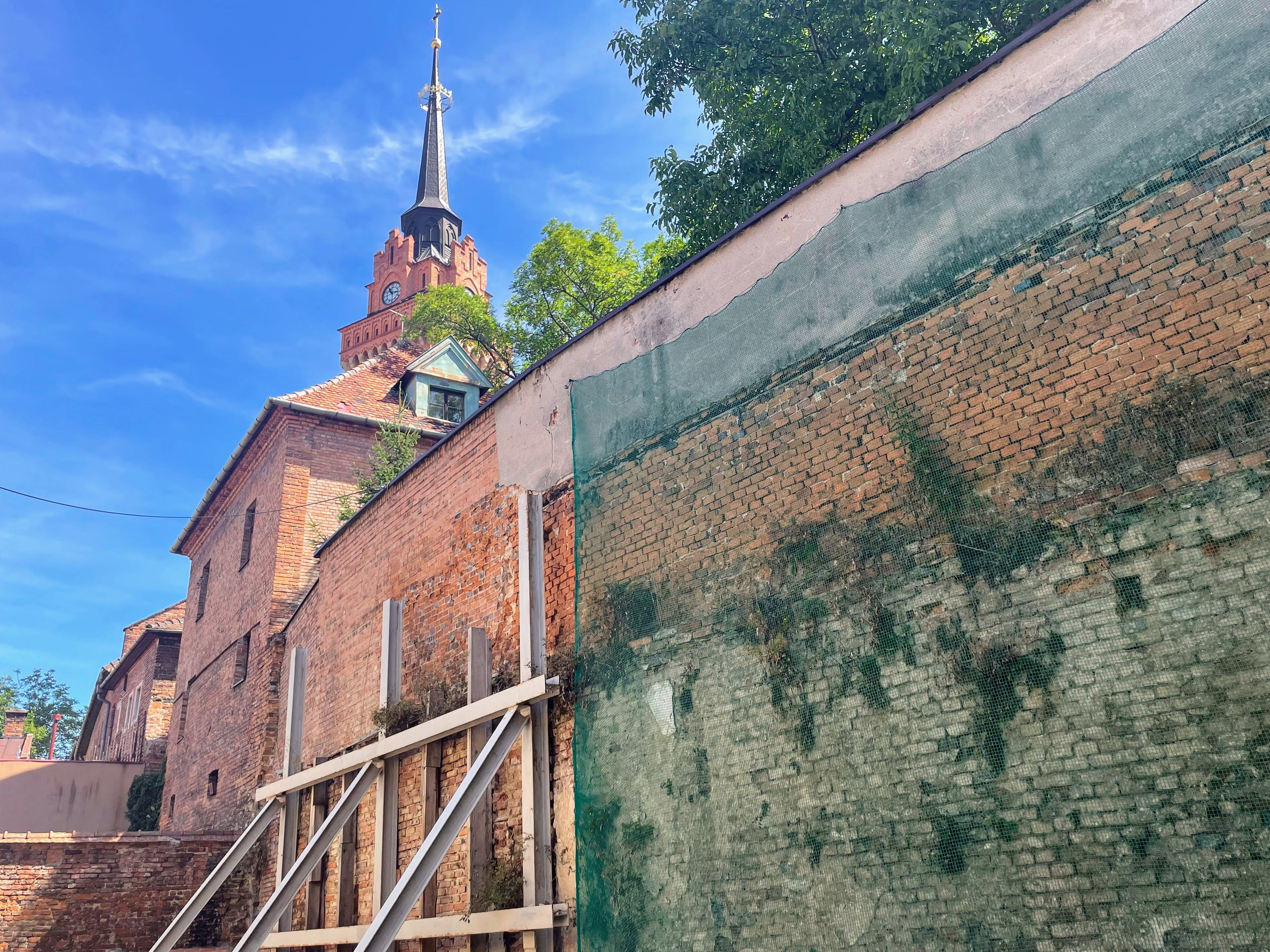
Preserved wall behind the buildings on Wałowa Street

Interest in the former city fortifications was revived at the turn of the 19th and 20th centuries due to growing curiosity about the city's past. Researchers began rediscovering their history, although it did not lead to scientific results at that time. It was only with the publication of the second monograph of the city in 1911 that new light was shed on the former fortifications. Despite increasing interest in the former walls during the interwar period, no work was carried out on them. Changes occurred during World War II, when the destruction of Jewish buildings revealed sections of the walls in the northeastern part of the city. During excavation work, the foundations of the Pilzno Gate were also discovered. During the war, one of the preserved bastions, located on Forteczna Street, was also demolished, as seen in interwar photographs. The first research on the former defensive walls was conducted by Józef Edward Dutkiewicz during the war and continued after its conclusion, with results published in the 1950s. These studies play a significant role in how the former fortifications are perceived today.

After World War II, following Dutkiewicz's concept, the preserved fragments of the walls were exposed. A plan for further revealing sections of the old fortifications was created, to be implemented by demolishing other buildings. This plan was partially realized by the Polish Conservation Studios of Historical Monuments in the 1960s. The exposed sections of the walls were renovated between 1954 and 1969 in the areas of Żydowska, Wąska, Bernardyńska, Basztowa streets, and the Pilzno Gate.

=== Current state ===
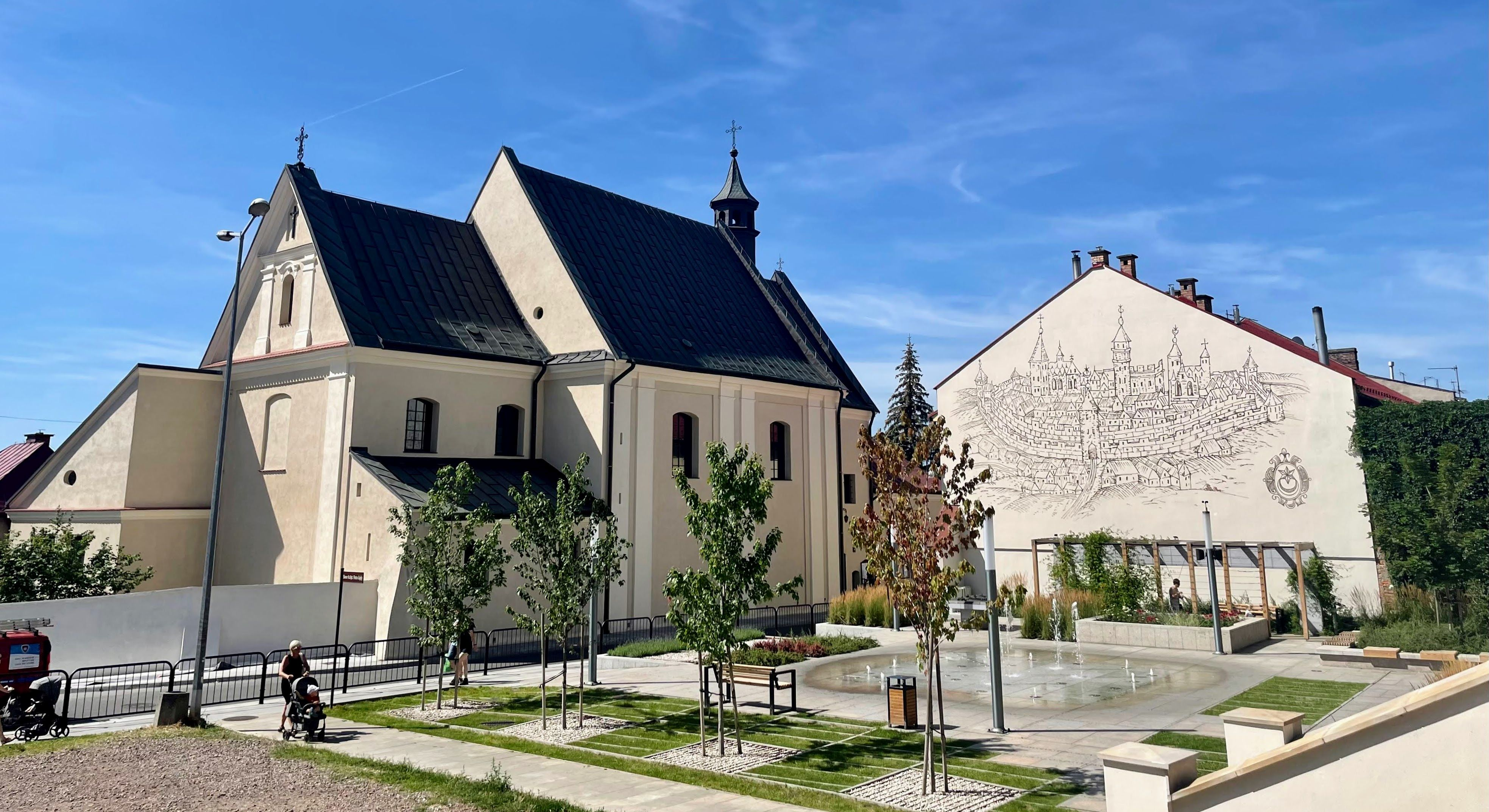
View of the square by Małe Schody Gate; mural on the tenement depicting Tarnów in 1644 with visible city fortifications

To this day, remnants of the Tarnów fortifications have been preserved along a length of approximately 400 meters on Wałowa, Targowa, Szeroka, Bernardyńska, Forteczna streets, and the Pilzno Gate. In 2011, a city tourist trail, "Medieval Walls of Tarnów", was established along the preserved sections of the fortifications.

In 2011, using funding from the Lesser Poland Regional Operational Program, the remnants of the walls on Forteczna Street, Taras Street, Pilzno Gate, and Szeroka Street were revitalized. The scope of the work included filling in gaps, reinforcing mortar and brick structures, applying a new covering with large-format roofing tiles, and cleaning the walls. The walls were also insulated, and lighting was installed along their entire length.

In April 2015, the Tarnów city fortifications were entered into the register of monuments of the Lesser Poland Voivodeship under the number A-1413/M.

Between 2017 and 2018, the preserved fragment of the wall with a gate known as Małe Schody located on Bernardyńska Street was renovated. Between 2019 and 2020, a square with a fountain was created by the renovated walls, and a mural depicting the view of Tarnów with fortifications from 1644 was painted on the adjacent building. During these works, remnants of the former defensive embankment and outer wall were discovered for the first time in the southern part of the defensive perimeter.

== Architecture ==
=== City walls ===
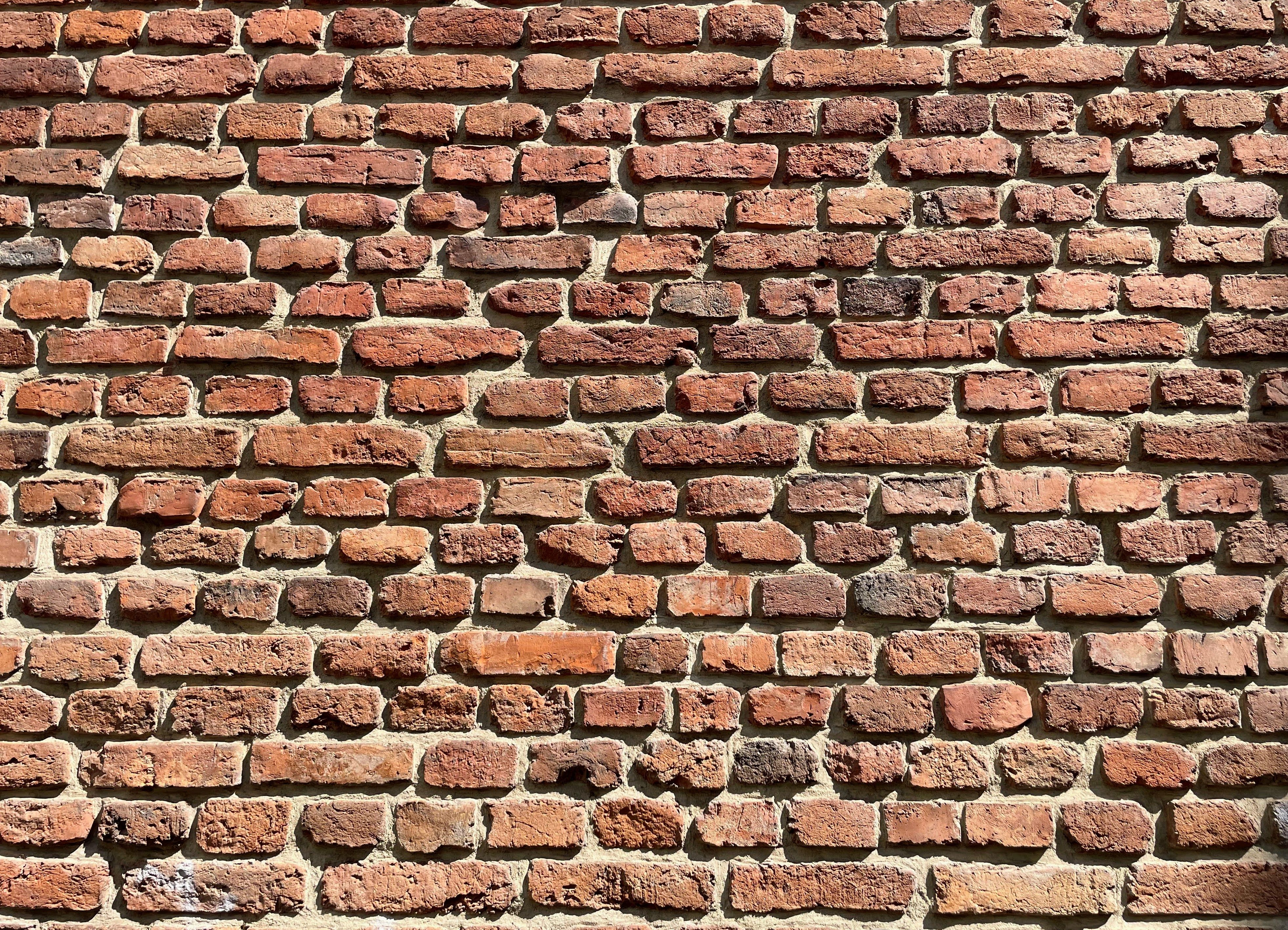
Preserved fragment of the 15th-century facing of the defensive wall

The city walls of Tarnów were built on an irregular oval plan, forming a perimeter adapted to the shape of the city hill. The oval of the city walls, elongated along the east-west axis, probably covered the entire area of the original town, which was about 6 hectares in size. The length of the wall line was approximately 900 meters.

The walls were constructed of brick laid in the Polish bond and, partially in the lower sections, of broken and field stone. They were erected as a curtain wall with a thickness ranging from 1.5 meters to over 2 meters in some places. One location where the original thickness of the walls can still be observed today is a fragment at 4 Brama Pilźnieńska Street, which is 1.48 meters thick.

The original height of the wall is not known today, but it was probably not lower than 3–4 meters, reaching 6 meters or even higher in some places. The appearance of the wall's crown is also uncertain; it may have featured battlements and a walkway for guards, possibly widened with a wooden platform. The walls were later topped, probably in the 16th century, when they were rebuilt and covered with a roof.

The outer wall, built in the 16th century, was constructed with stone in the lower sections and brick in the upper parts. It was lower than the inner wall and was positioned on the edge of the defensive embankment, with its wall slanted inward to absorb the impact of projectiles and cannonballs.

Today, some fragments of the walls are integrated into the structure of tenements and often serve as their back walls. The wall preserved on the southern side, in the area of the Market Square, also functions as a retaining wall.

=== Structures located along the walls ===
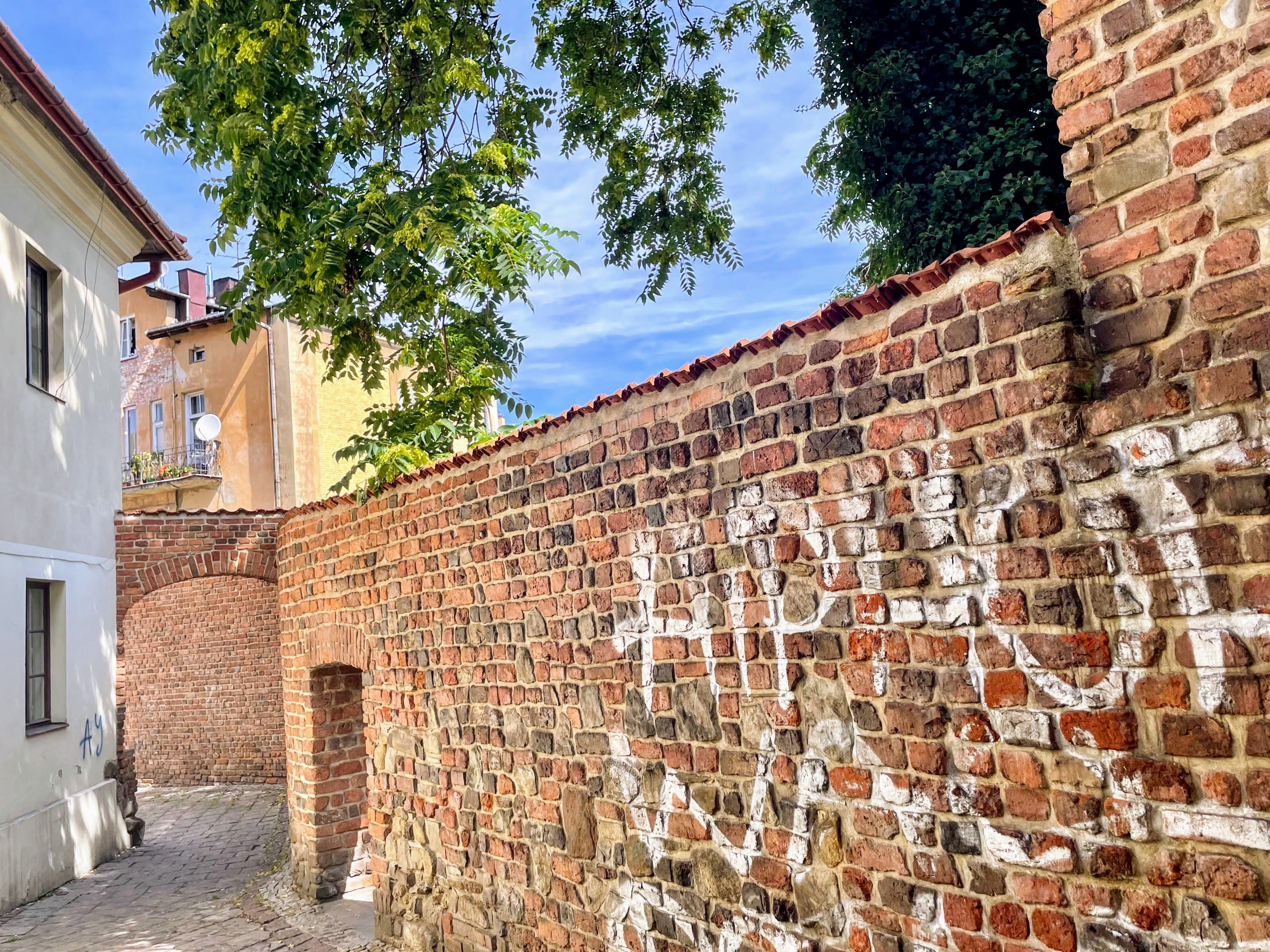
Fragment of the city walls near Forteczna Street

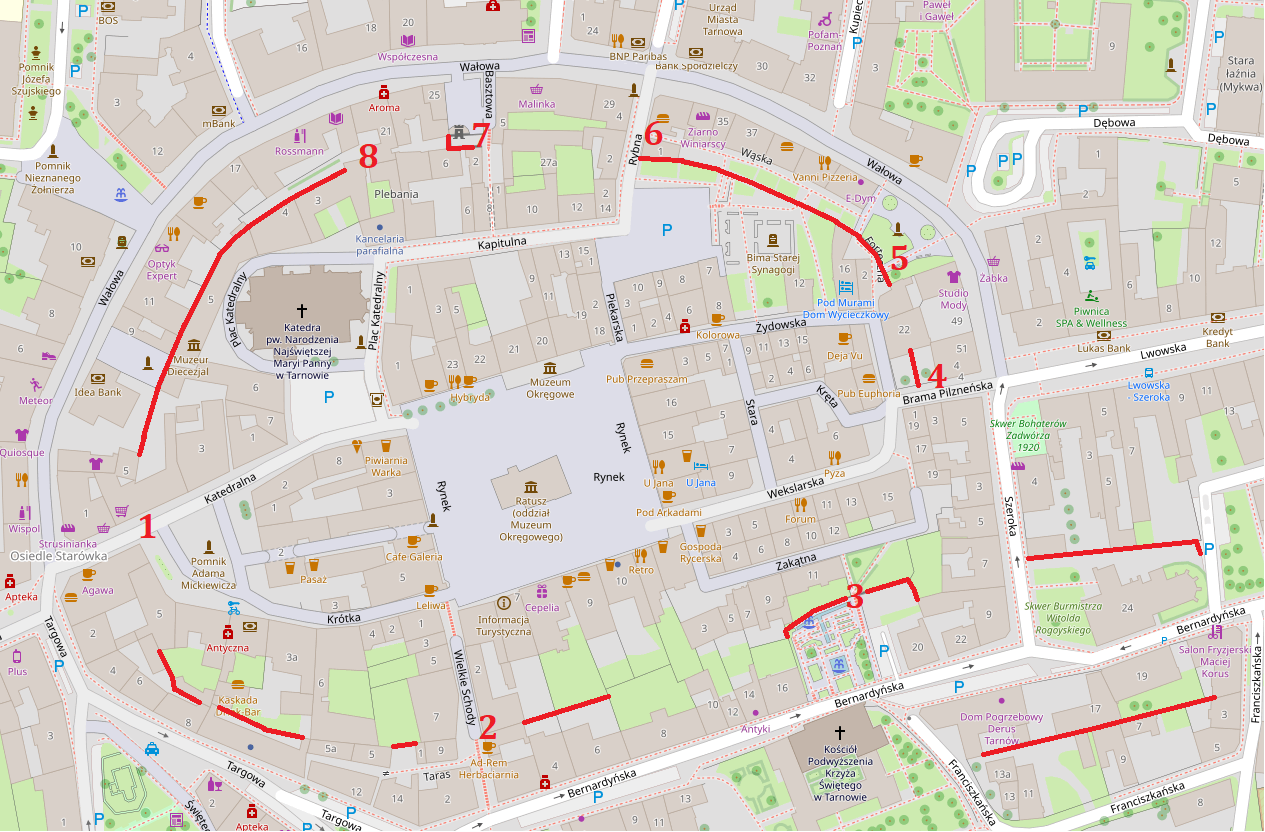
Map showing the locations of the structures of the Tarnów city fortifications

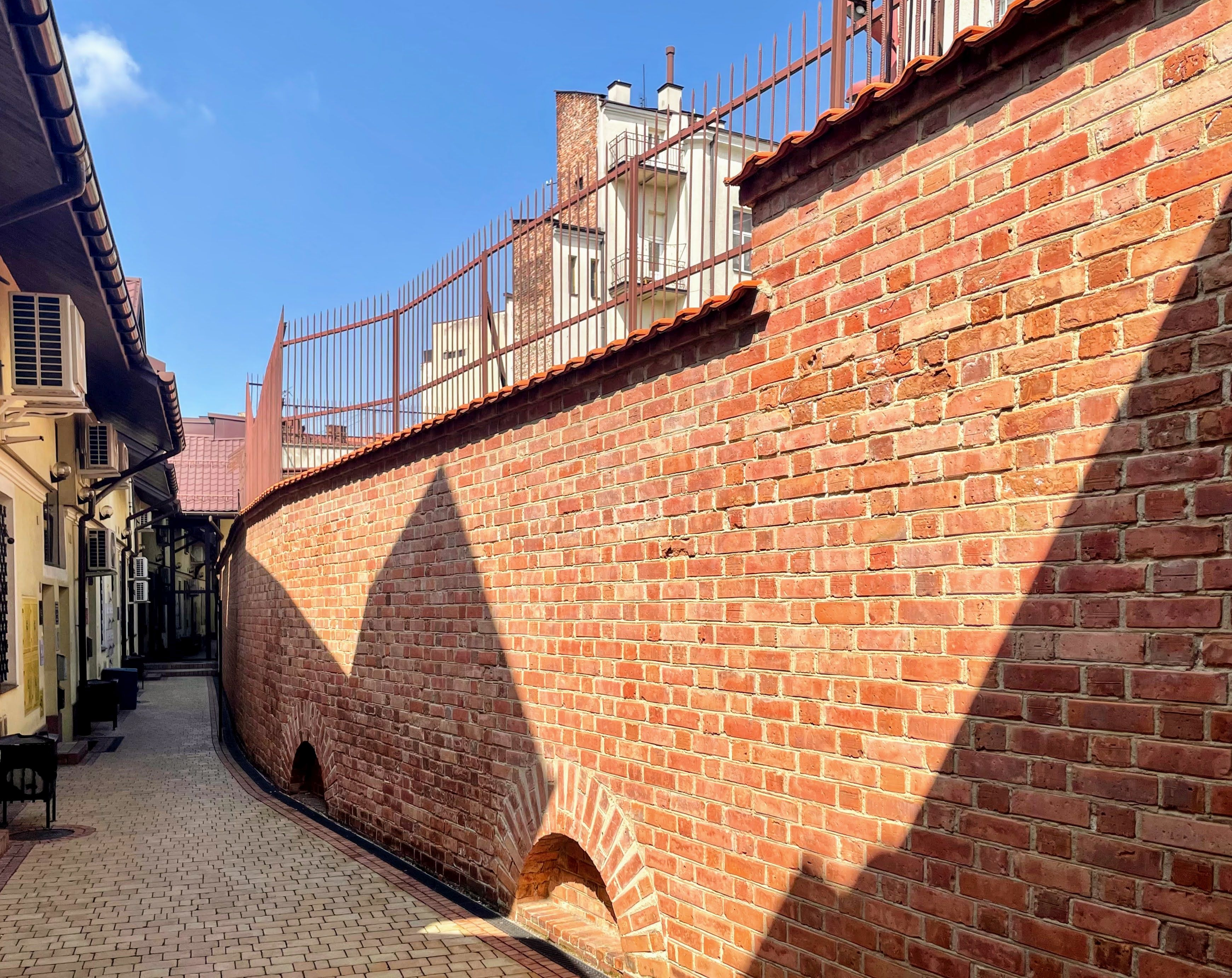
Fragment of the wall in the courtyard of a tenement house at 10 Targowa Street

Along the city walls of Tarnów, there were several dozen architectural structures, including 2 main gates, about 10 wickets, and 9 or 10 towers and bastions. Today, the locations of the following buildings are known:

- Kraków Gate
- Pilzno Gate
- Wicket at the exit of Wielkie Schody Street (also known as the "smaller gate on the hospital side")
- Wicket at the exit of Rybna Street (also known as the gate named "Staromensis")
- Wicket at Forteczna Street
- Wicket at the exit of Małe Schody Street
- Wicket on today's Basztowa Street
- Wicket from Wąska Street
- St. Anna's Wicket
- Princely Tower (also known as the tower by the presbytery)
- Bastion from the first half of the 16th century (locally known as a half-tower)
- Tower at Forteczna Street

==== Towers and bastions ====
It is unknown whether the wall was reinforced with towers in its early period; some sources state that they existed, but their locations and number are not known. Other sources, however, suggest that the towers probably did not exist, as there are no source references or traces of them.

It is probable that the tower called "Princely", located on the northern side of the fortifications at 2 Kapitulna Street, dates back to the 14th century. This structure has a rectangular shape at the bottom, transitioning into an irregular cylinder higher up. Its original height is believed to have reached three above-ground levels, with wall thickness at the lower parts reaching up to 1.8 meters. Having been adapted for residential purposes, it is now part of a building serving as the residence of the auxiliary bishops of the Roman Catholic Diocese of Tarnów.

Traces of other towers, also presumably from the 14th century, have been found in the areas of properties at 23 and 37 Wałowa Street, 6 Cathedral Square, and at the end of Forteczna Street. At the site of the former tower at Forteczna Street, a rounding of the wall line is visible, and the structure itself was dismantled between 1941 and 1942.

The existence of towers within Tarnów's fortifications was documented in the 16th century, during the modernization of the defensive system. They mainly reinforced the outer wall, although there was at least one located by the inner fortifications. One of the 16th-century defensive structures (locally known as a half-tower) is preserved in the Spycimir Leliwita alley at the junction of Wałowa and Basztowa streets and represents an example of a bastion. The thickness of its walls reaches 1 meter at the base, gradually decreasing at higher levels. The building has walls slightly inclined inward, with fan-shaped embrasures placed in them. It is covered with a conical roof.

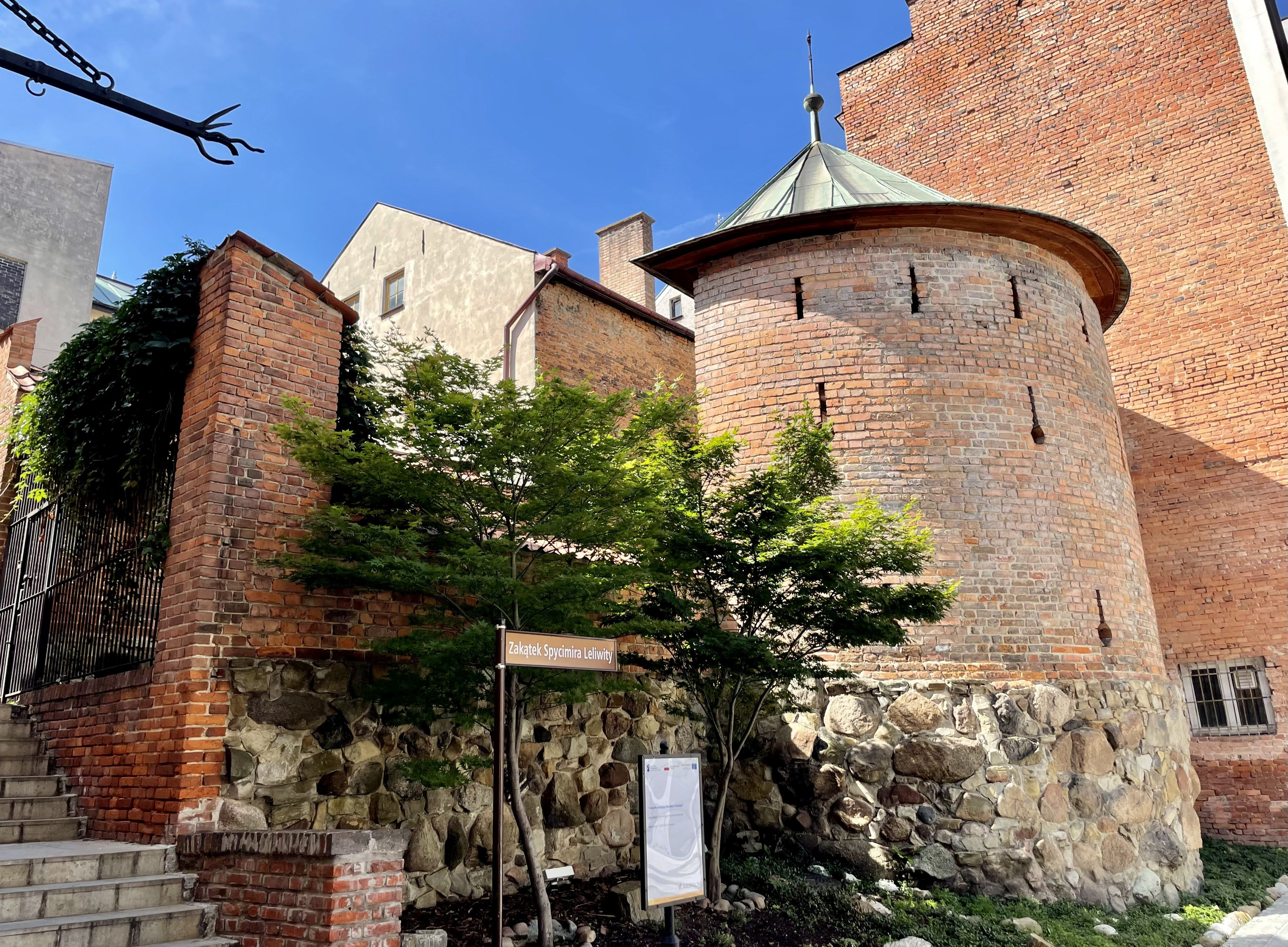
Fragment of the forewall with a 16th-century bastion

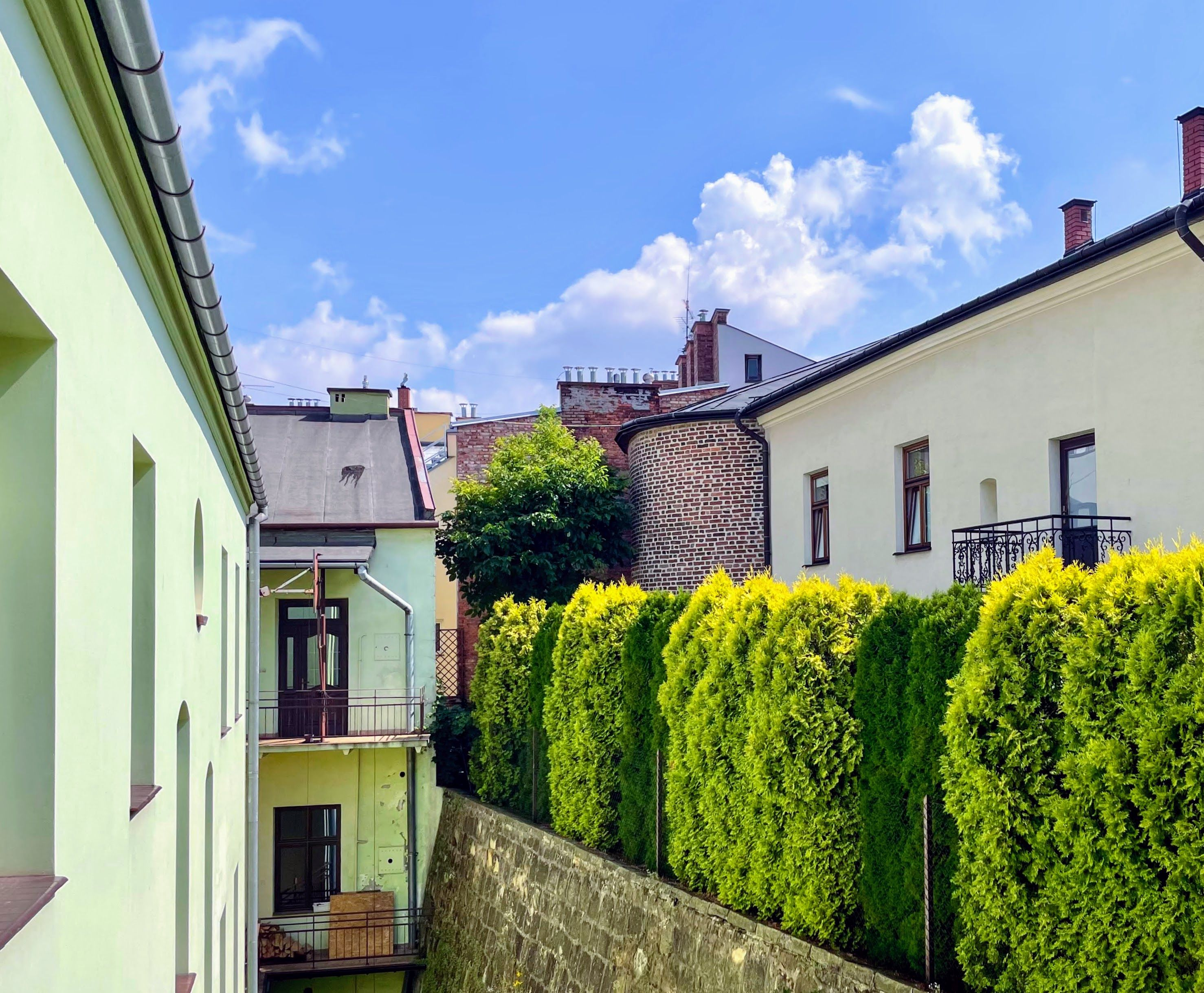
View of the Princely Tower from the courtyard of the tenement at 19 Wałowa Street

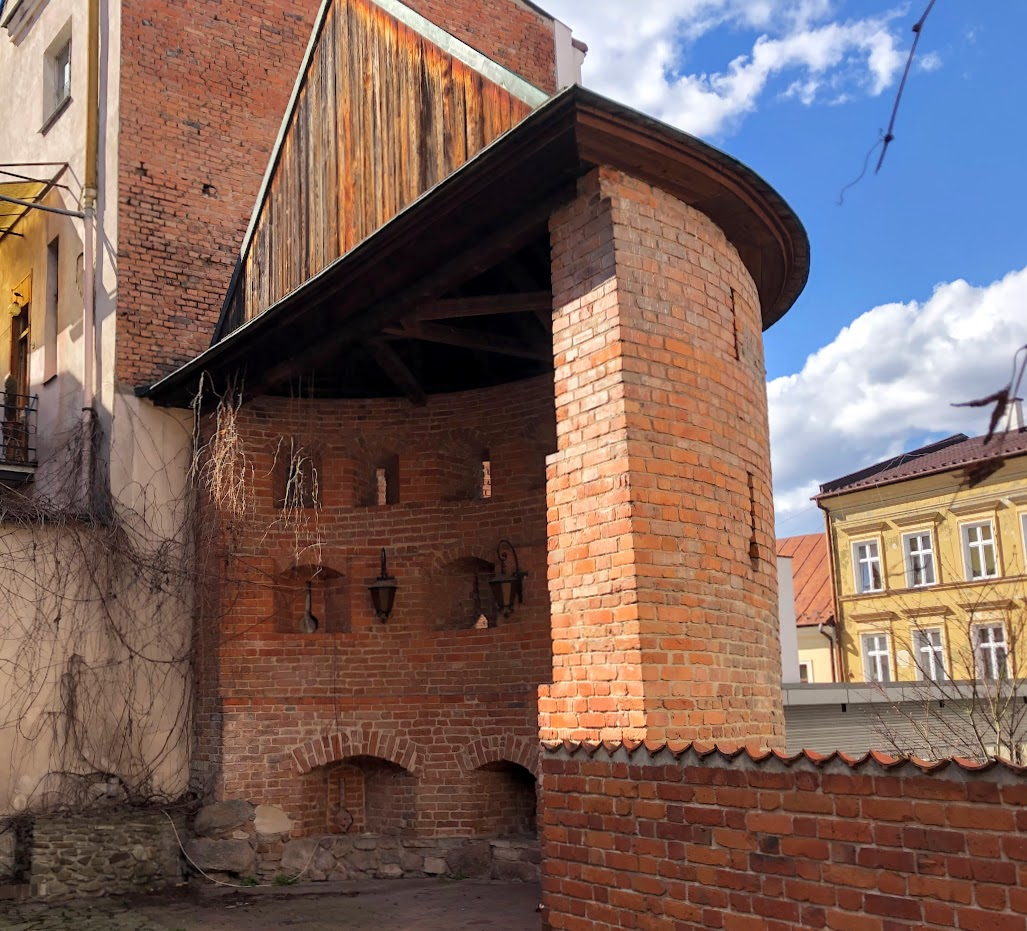
Interior of the 16th-century bastion

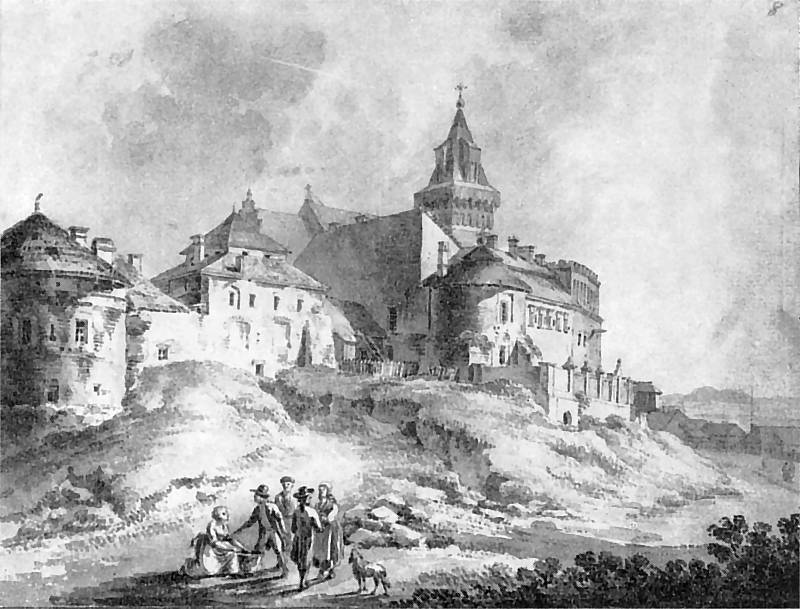
Remnants of the walls from the side of Wałowa Street in 1800 according to Vogel, with the visible bastion and the Princely Tower

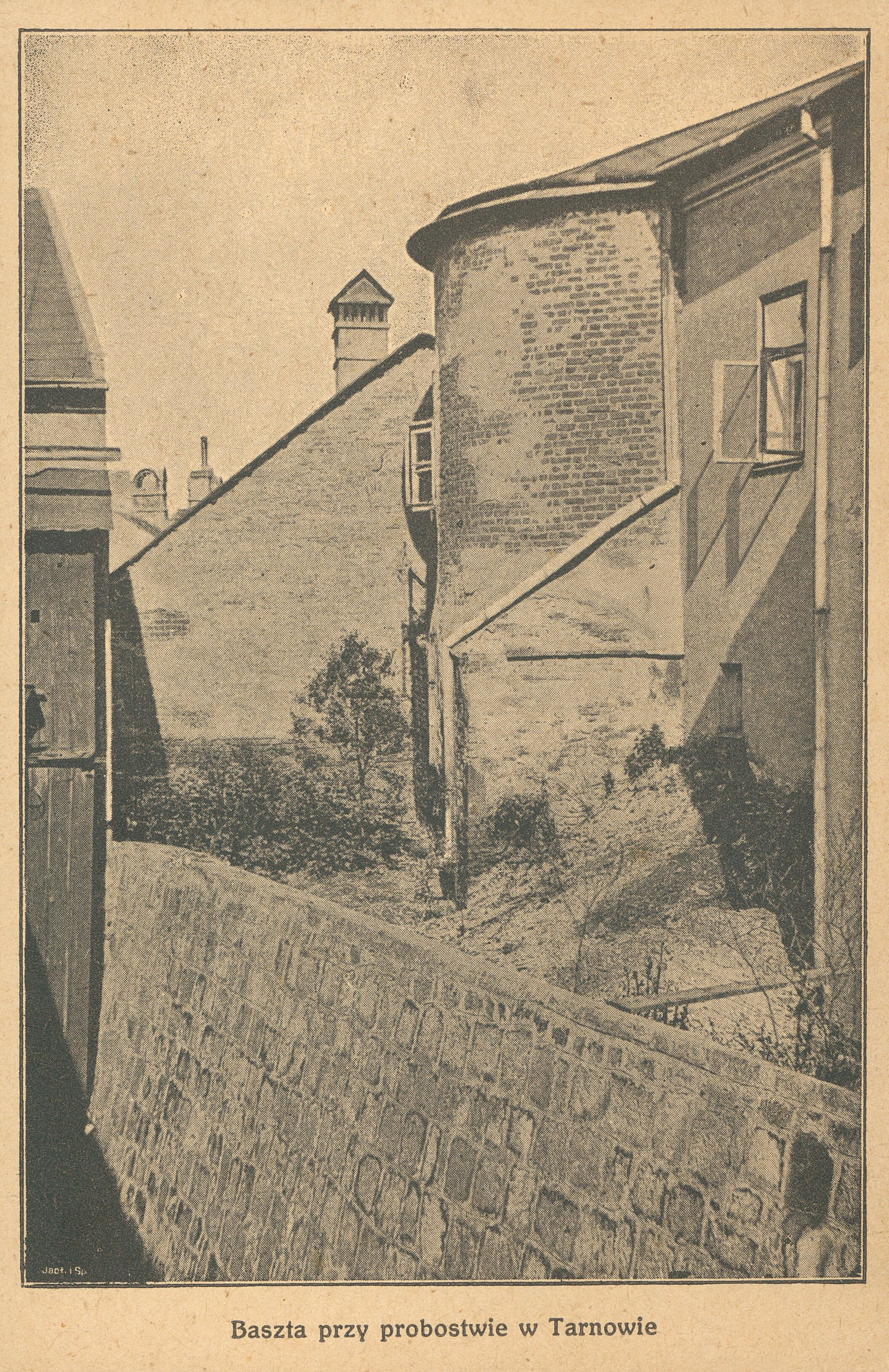
Princely Tower in the first half of the 20th century

==== City gates and wickets ====
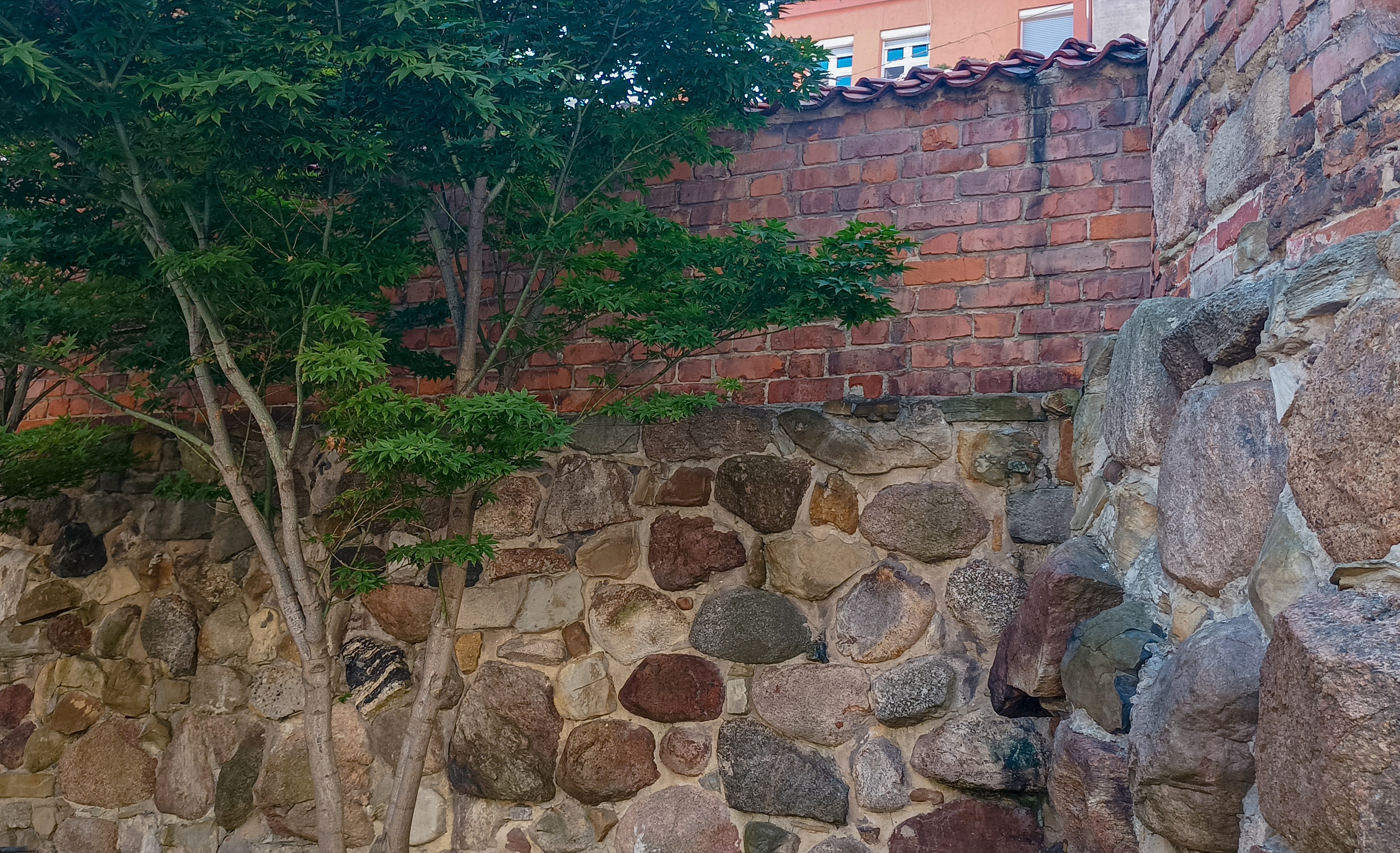
Preserved fragment of the forewall

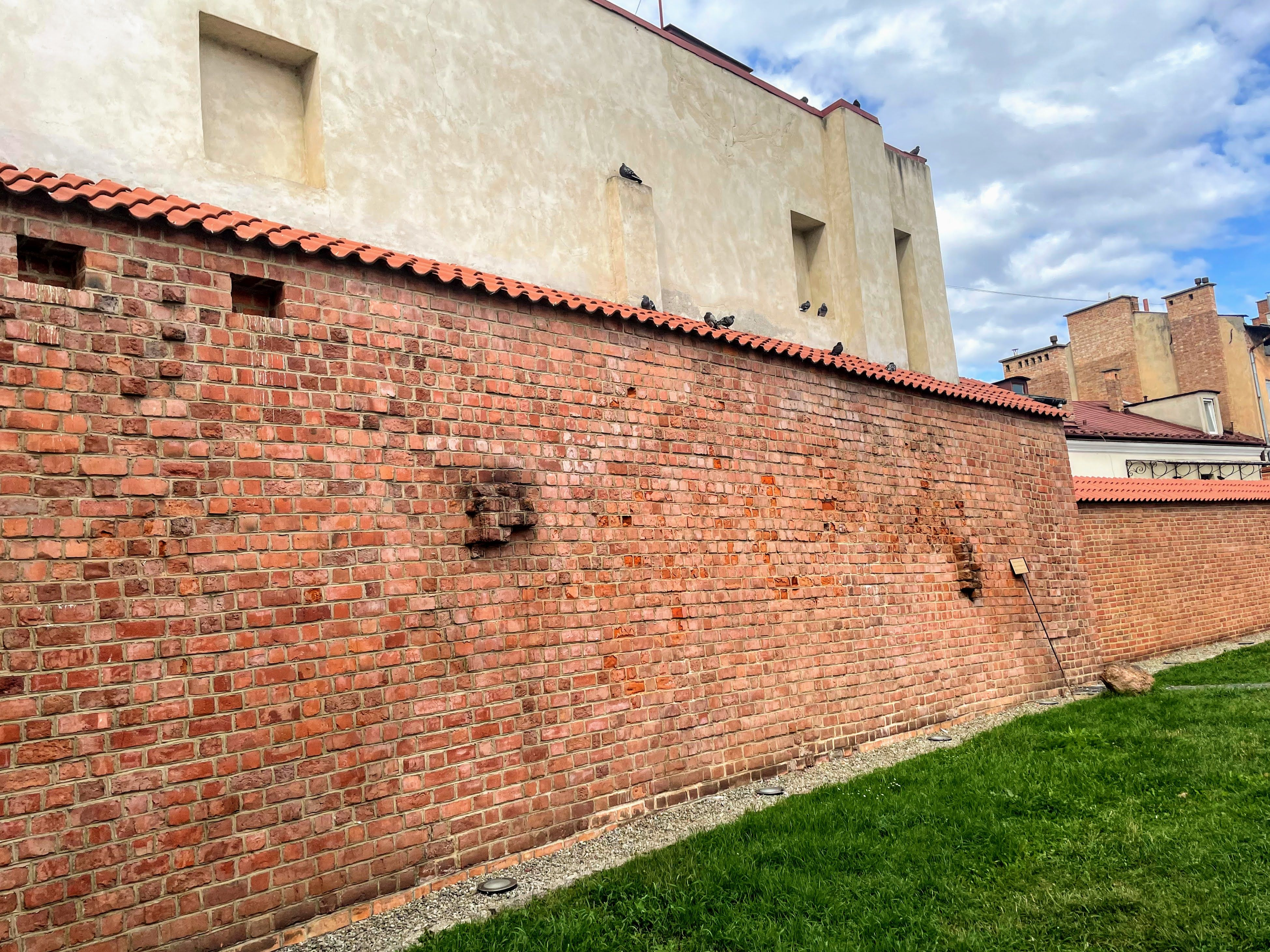
Fragment of the city wall at Rybna Street

The defensive walls of Tarnów included two main city gates: Kraków and Pilzno. These structures were original, and the Pilzno Gate was built alongside the defensive walls. The gates were located in pass-through towers constructed on a rectangular plan or in towers projecting beyond the wall line. Streets from the southern and northern sides of the Market Square converged at both gate towers. According to records from the 18th century, it is known that the gates, presumably since medieval times, had triple doors, including one drawbridge, as well as side wicket gates for pedestrians. It is also known that sewage flowing through the main street gutter was discharged beyond the wall circuit through the Pilzno Gate.

The Kraków Gate was located on the western side of the fortification system, at the junction of Katedralna and Targowa streets, while the Pilzno Gate was situated on the eastern side of the walls, in the middle of the present-day Brama Pilźnieńska Street.

In the 16th century, during the modernization of the city's fortifications, both gates were significantly expanded; the structures included foregates, and expenses for building hostigiums were recorded. One researcher of old Tarnów, Józef Edward Dutkiewicz, also speculated that the gate towers might have been topped with attics. Both gates were still visible on plans prepared for the Austrian army between 1779 and 1783, but it is known that the Kraków Gate was no longer present in Zygmunt Vogel's illustrations from 1800 (in its place, a pile of stones could be seen, possibly remnants from the building's demolition).

In addition to the two main gates, the city also had so-called smaller gates: one at the end of the present-day Wielkie Schody Street, called the "smaller gate on the hospital side", and another in the area of Rybna and Wąska streets, known as "Staromensis".

The existence of the gate at Wielkie Schody Street is confirmed by an entry in the city register from the 16th century; it was also mentioned in an inspection from 1732 and is visible on the genealogical tree of the Tarnowski family from the 17th century. It was situated on the southern side of the fortifications. A road led from it to Hungary and to the Tarnów Castle, and the gate was presumably a pedestrian passage only, although there are also mentions contradicting this, due to an order issued in 1567 by Konstanty Ostrogski to pave the road connecting the city to the castle.

No traces have survived of the northern gate, located in the area of Rybna and Wąska streets. It is known that a road led from it to Dąbrowa Tarnowska and towards the Vistula river.

The city's defensive system also included wicket gates to facilitate communication between the gates, but their exact locations and numbers are unknown; there were probably about 10 of them, although there were also reports suggesting as many as 15. Today, the known locations of wicket gates are:

- at Forteczna Street
- at the end of Małe Schody Street (the gate is located on the southern side of the fortifications, in the area of Bernardyńska and Małe Schody streets)
- at the present-day Basztowa Street (located on the northern side of the fortifications, next to the preserved 16th-century bastion)
- at Wąska Street (on the southern side of the walls, near the former synagogue)
- St. Anna's Wicket (situated in the southwestern part of the fortifications, at the corner of Kazimierz Wielki Square).
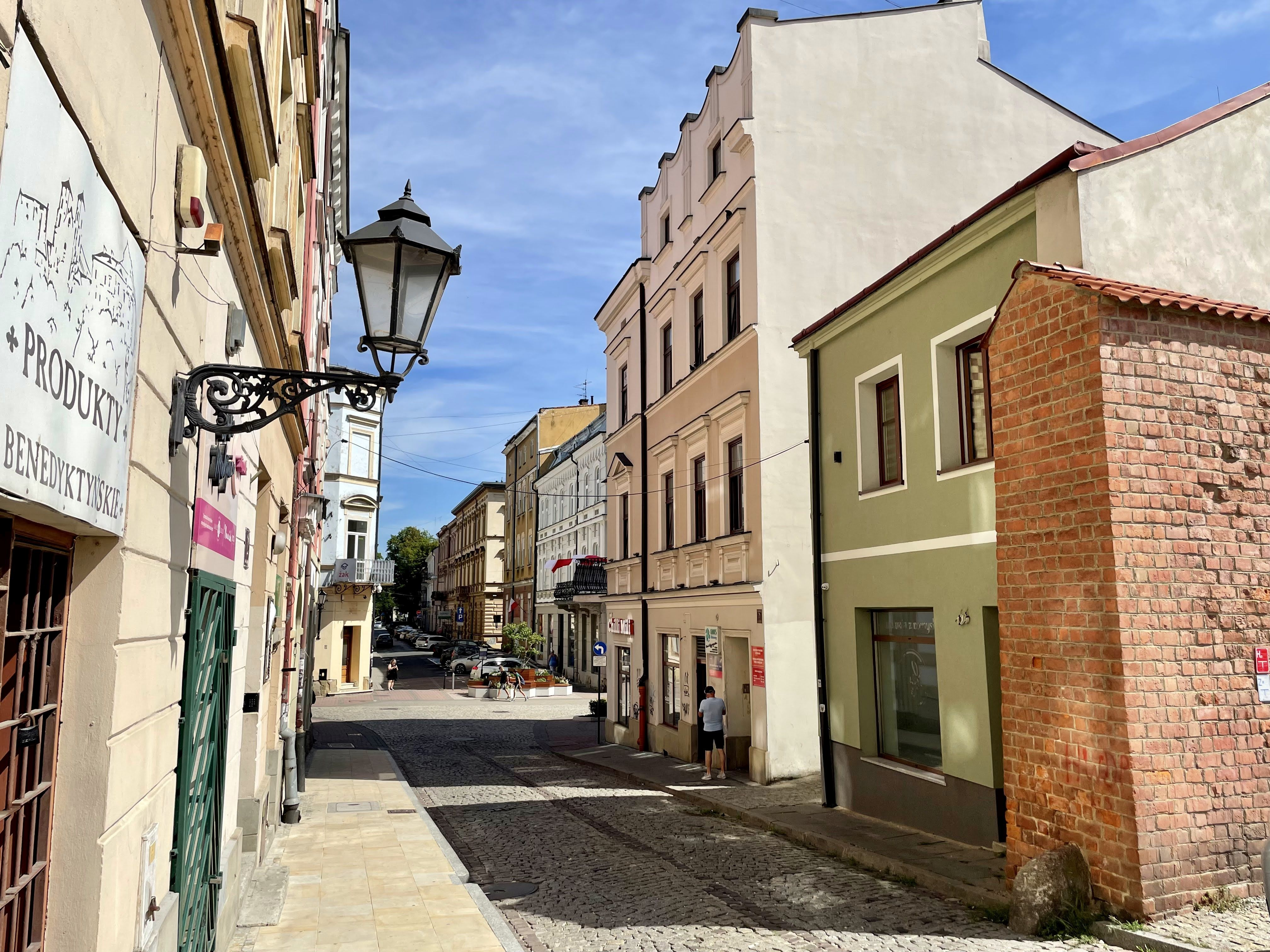
Place where the northern smaller gate was presumably located

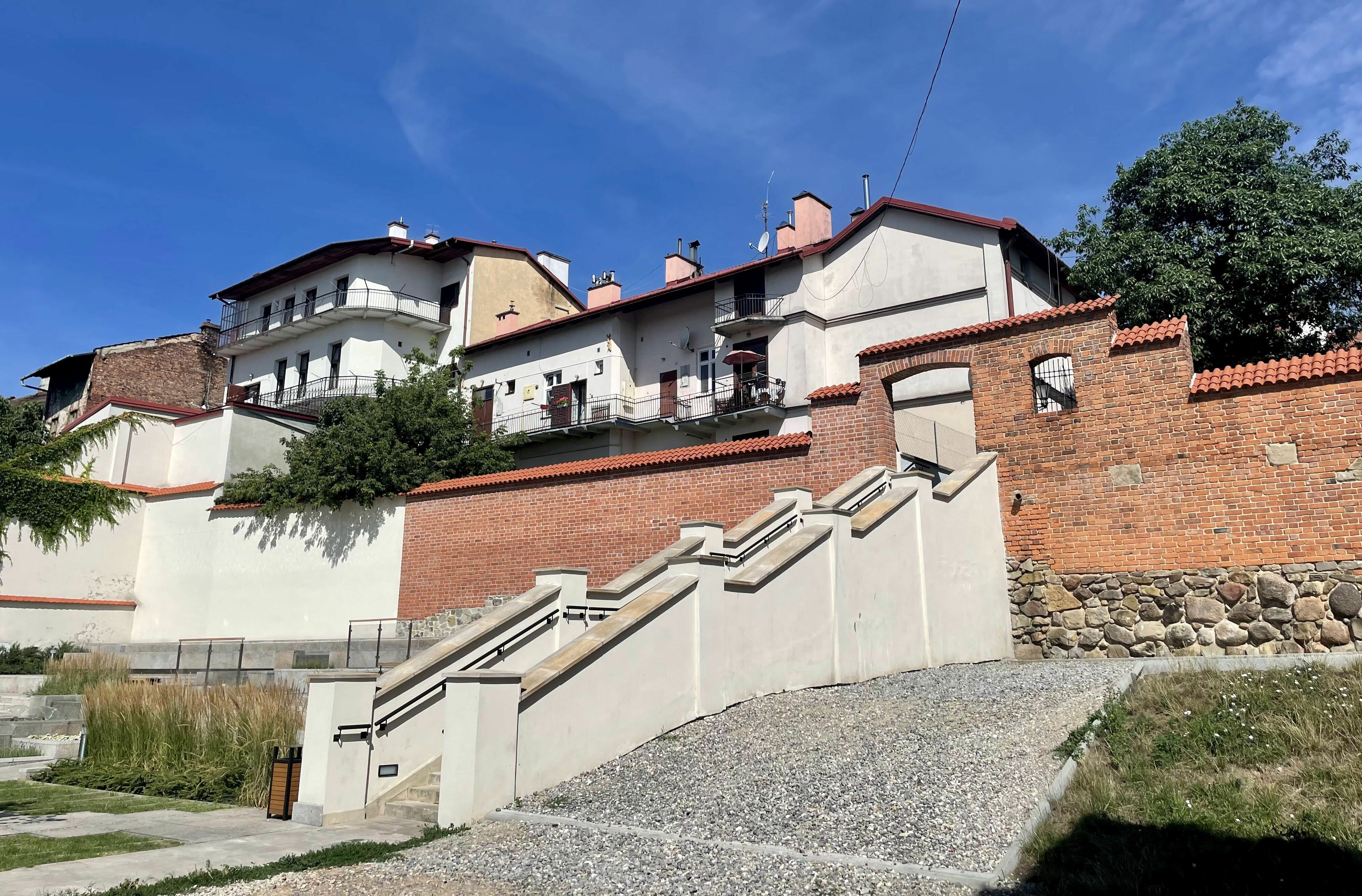
Fragment of the walls with the Małe Schody Gate at Bernardyńska Street

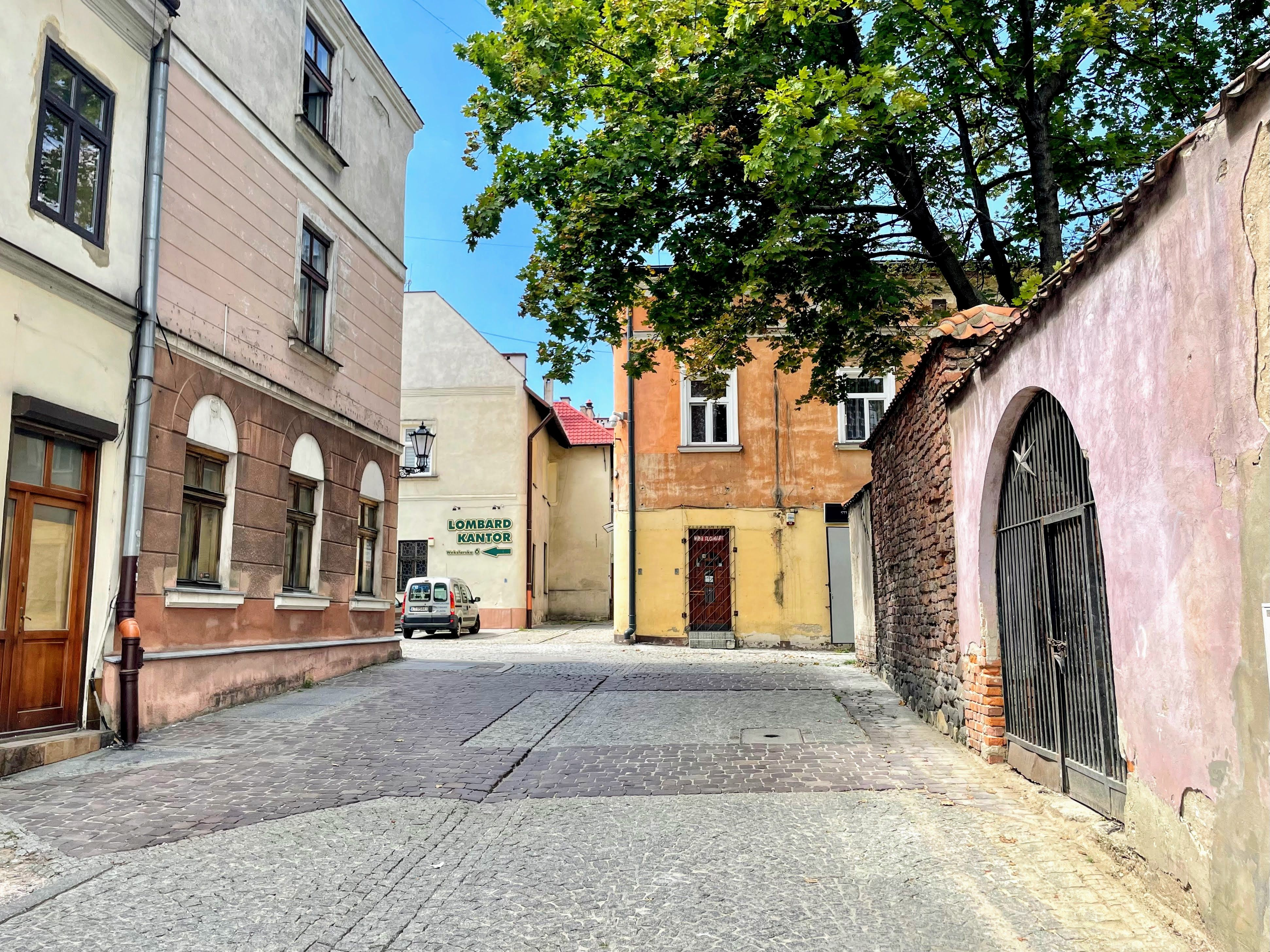
Place where the Pilzno Gate was located. The outline of the former structure has been preserved in the pavement with dark cobblestones

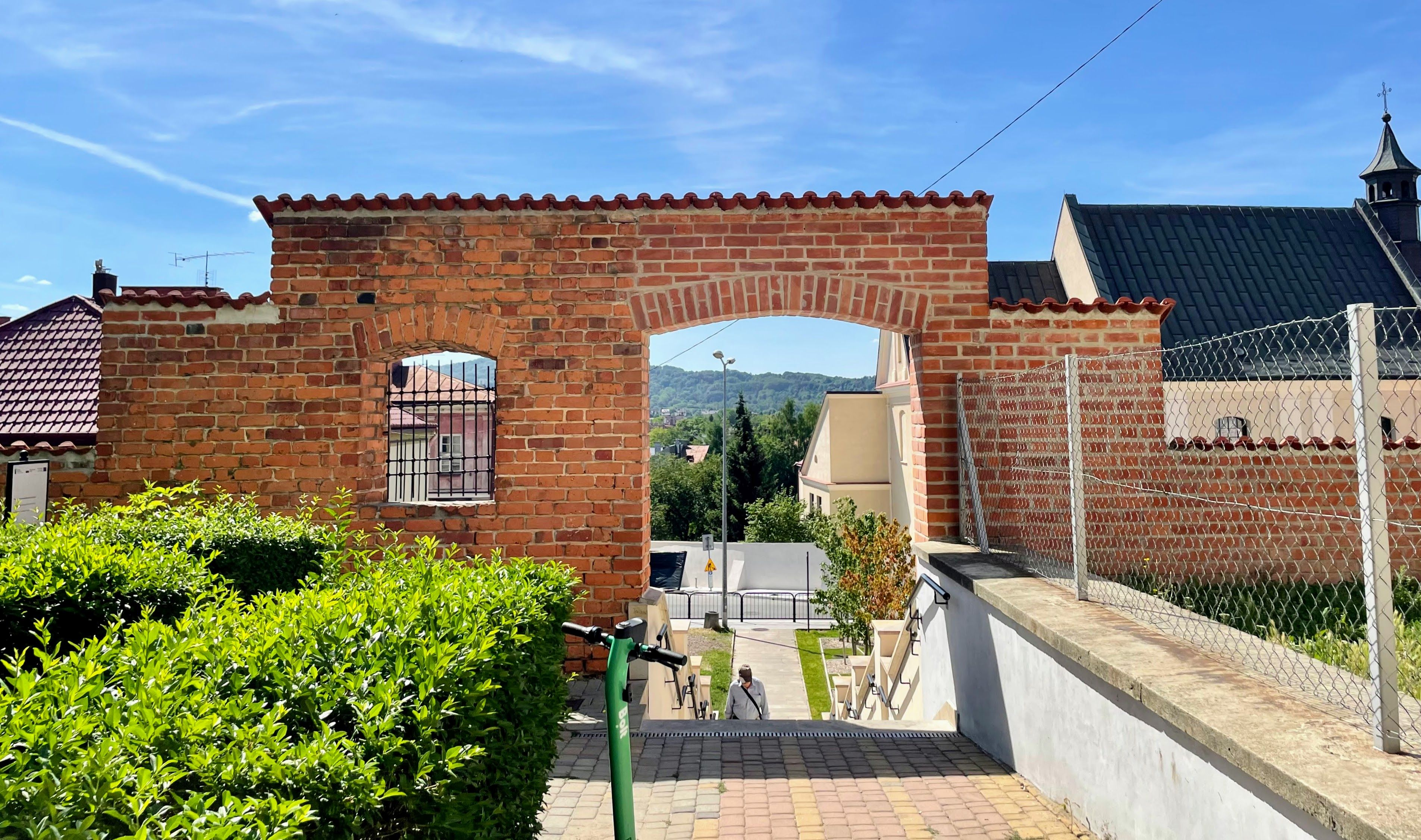
View from the city side towards the gate at Małe Schody Street, leading south

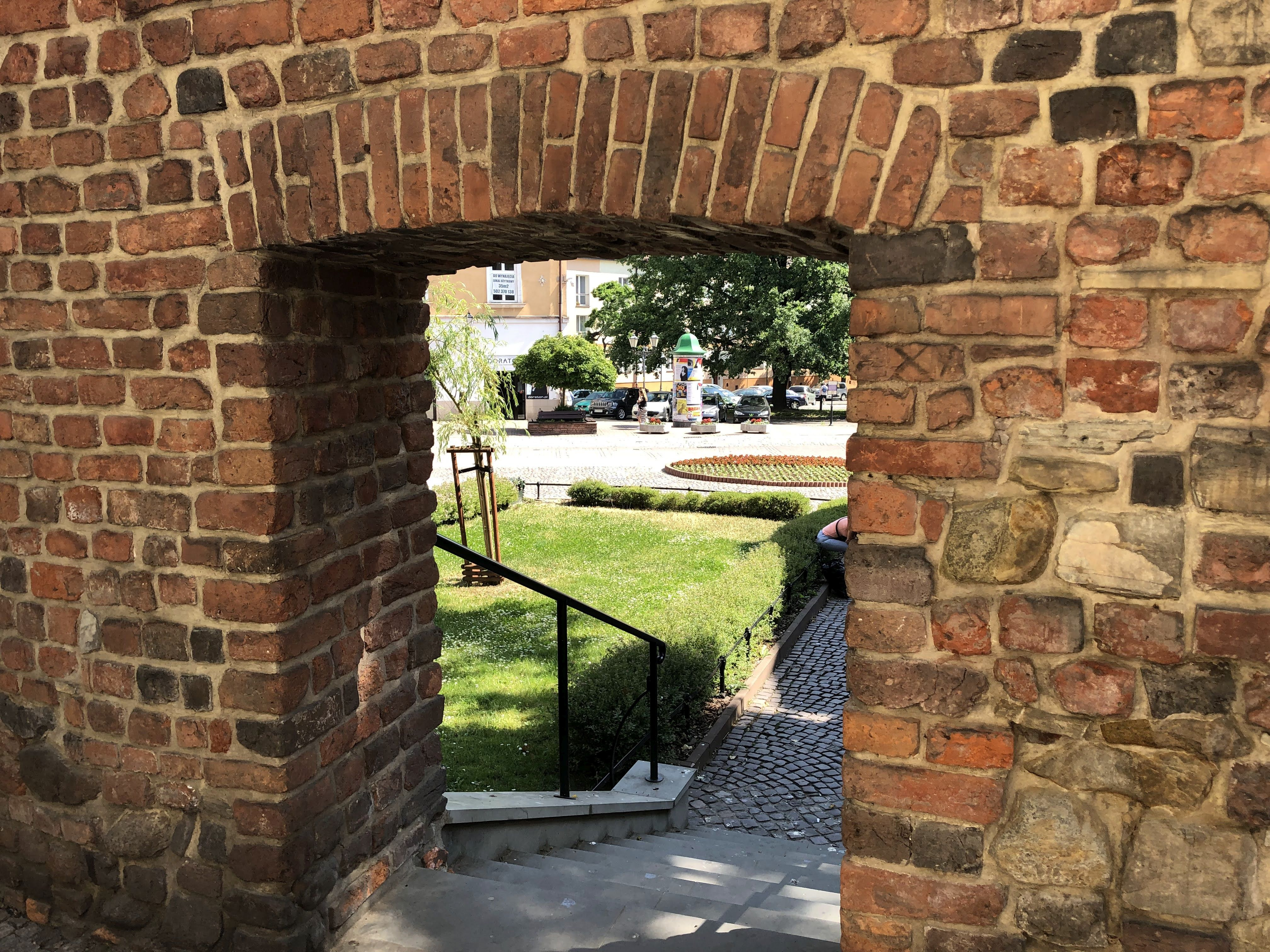
Preserved gate in the wall at Forteczna Street
