= Biała (Dunajec) =

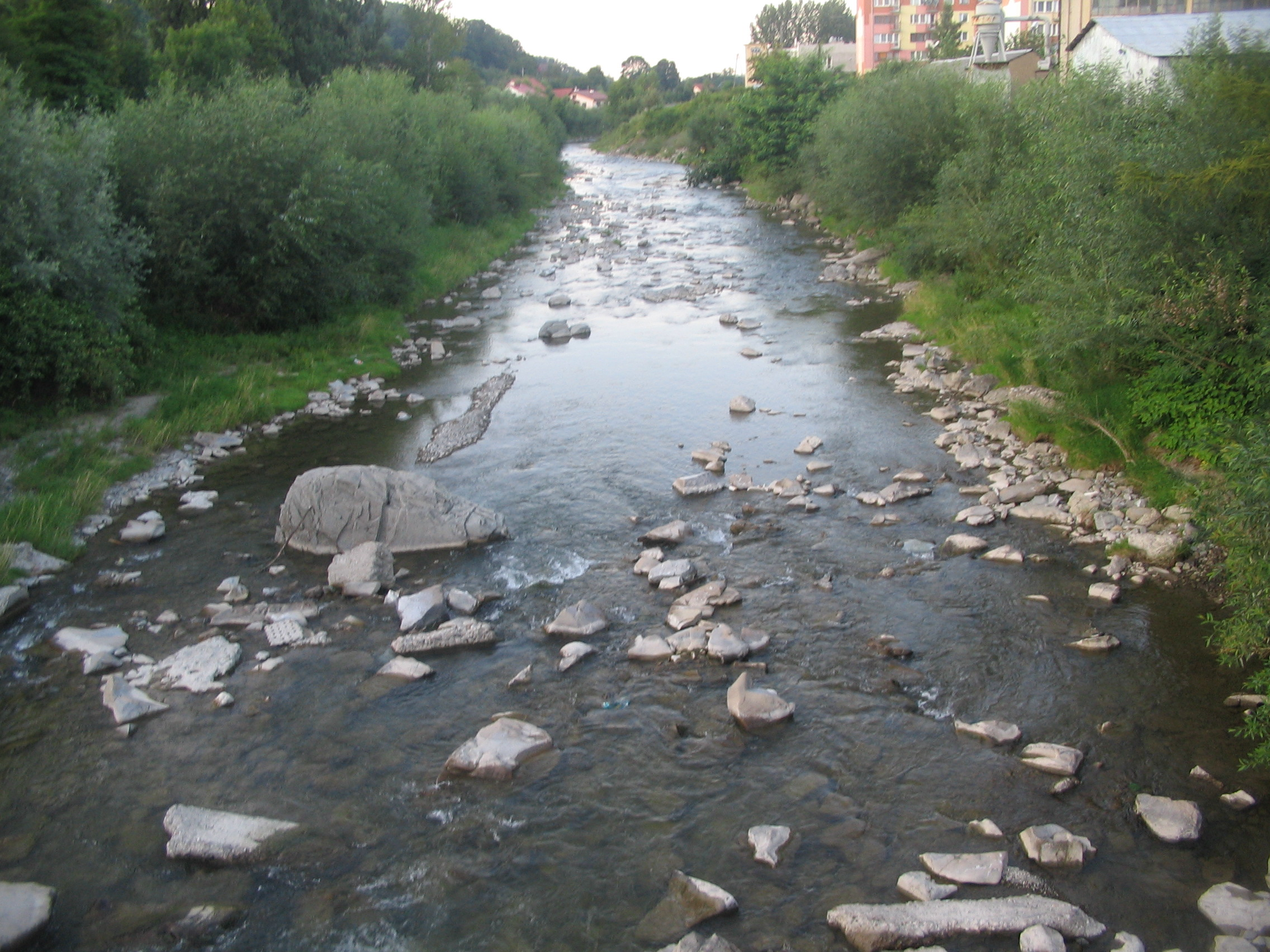

Location
- Country: Poland

Physical characteristics
- Mouth
  - location: Dunajec
  - coordinates: 50°02′11″N 20°54′48″E
- Length: 101.8 km (63.3 mi)

Basin features
- Progression: Dunajec→ Vistula→ Baltic Sea

Biała is a river in eastern central Poland, a right tributary of the Dunajec, which it meets in the town of Tarnów. Arising in the Laborec Highlands of Slovakia, the river flows through the Polish towns of:

- Zakopane
- Poronin
- Biały Dunajec
- Szaflary
- Nowy Targ

Among its own tributaries is the Wątok.
