= Wątok =

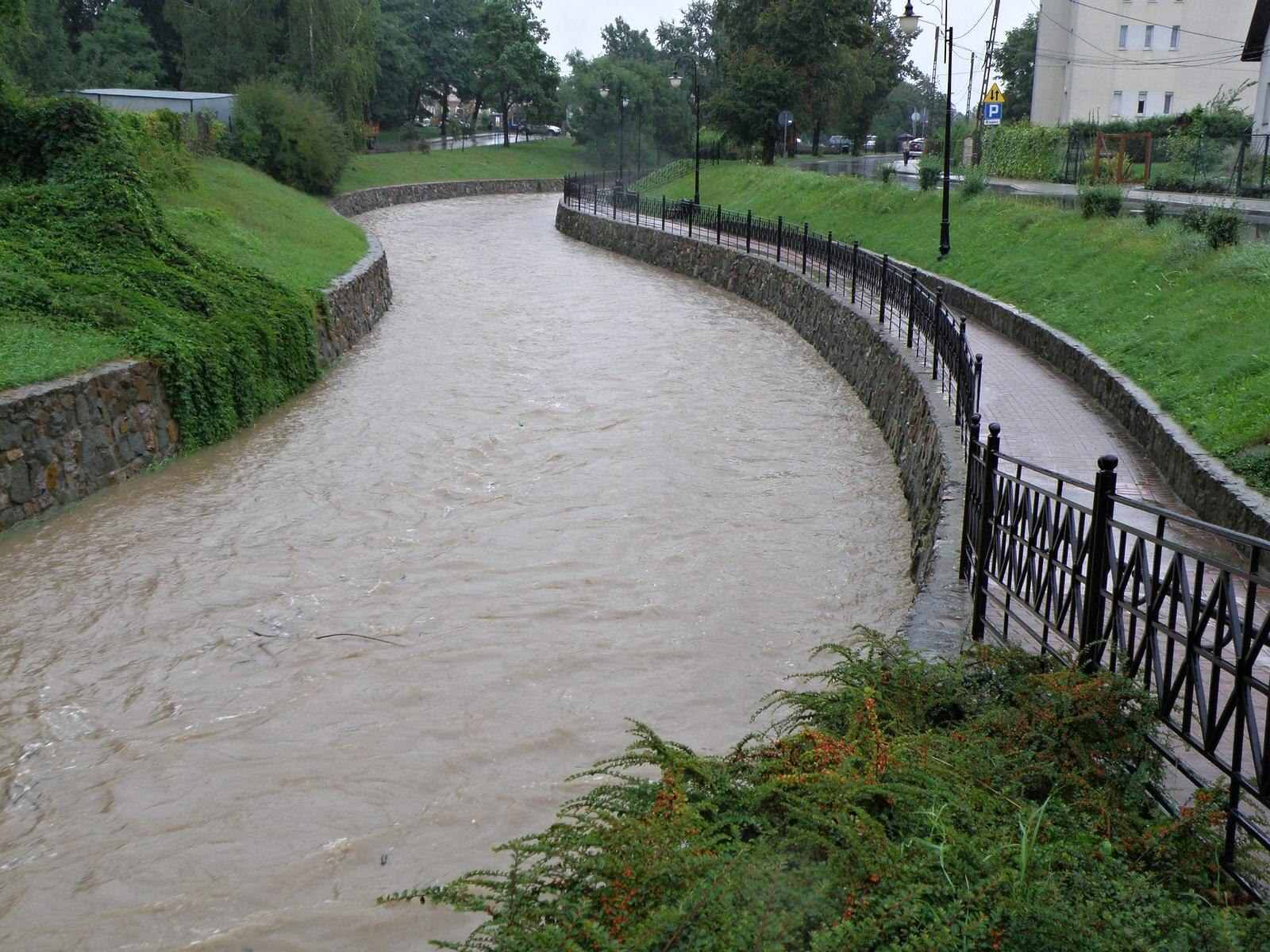
- Wątok in Tarnów during high water level

Location
- Country: Poland
- Voivodeship: Lesser Poland

Physical characteristics
- Source
  - location: near Zalasowa, Tarnów County
  - coordinates: 49°55′43.0″N 21°07′07.0″E
  - elevation: 321 m (1,053 ft)
- Mouth: Biała
  - location: eastern tip of the Gumniska-Zabłocie district, in southern Tarnów
  - coordinates: 49°59′34″N 20°57′36″E
  - elevation: 191.6 m (629 ft)
- Length: 23.02 km (14.30 mi)
- Basin size: 84.94 km^{2} (32.80 mi^{2})
- Discharge
  - average: 0.748 m^{3}/s (26.4 cu ft/s)

Basin features
- Progression: Biała→ Dunajec→ Vistula→ Baltic Sea

Wątok is a river of Poland, a tributary of the Biała, which it meets in Tarnów.
