= Tomb of Paweł Holszański =

16th-century Renaissance tomb in Vilnius

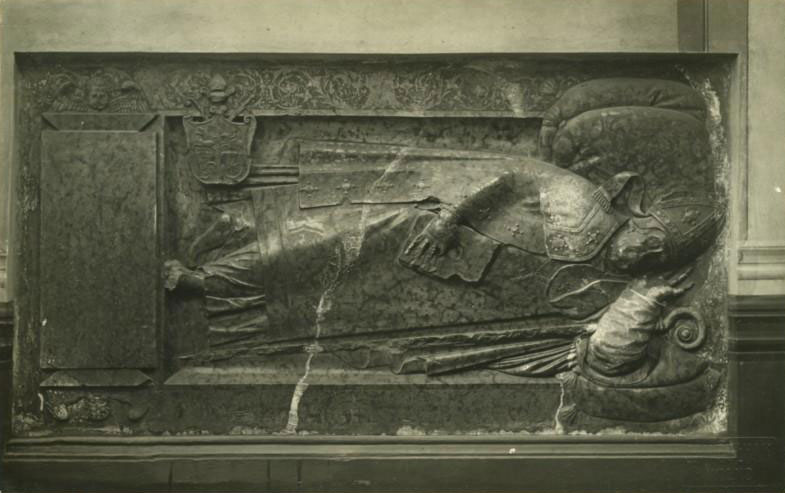
- The effigy of Paweł Holszański (photograph from the early 20th century)
- Artist: Workshop of Padovano
- Year: c. 1550
- Type: Effigy, funerary art
- Subject: Paweł Holszański
- Location: Vilnius Cathedral; Vilnius, Lithuania

The Tomb of Paweł Holszański is a Renaissance sculptural effigy of the Bishop of Vilnius Paweł Holszański (died 1555), located in Vilnius Cathedral. It was created in the workshop of Gian Maria Padovano approximately around 1550.

== Description ==
Holszański is depicted lying in a relaxed pose. He supports his head with his left hand and holds a book with his right hand. The massive figure of the deceased is dressed in rich ecclesiastical vestments, draped in free folds.

The portrait likeness is rendered realistically, emphasizing features of a strong-willed, authoritative character. The elderly face, cut by wrinkles, is devoid of idealization. The decorative border consists of typical Renaissance elements — floral motifs and heads of putti.

== See also ==
- Holszański family
- Tomb of Albrecht Goštautas
