= Tarnów Town Hall =

Town hall in Tarnów, Poland

- Ratusz w Tarnowie
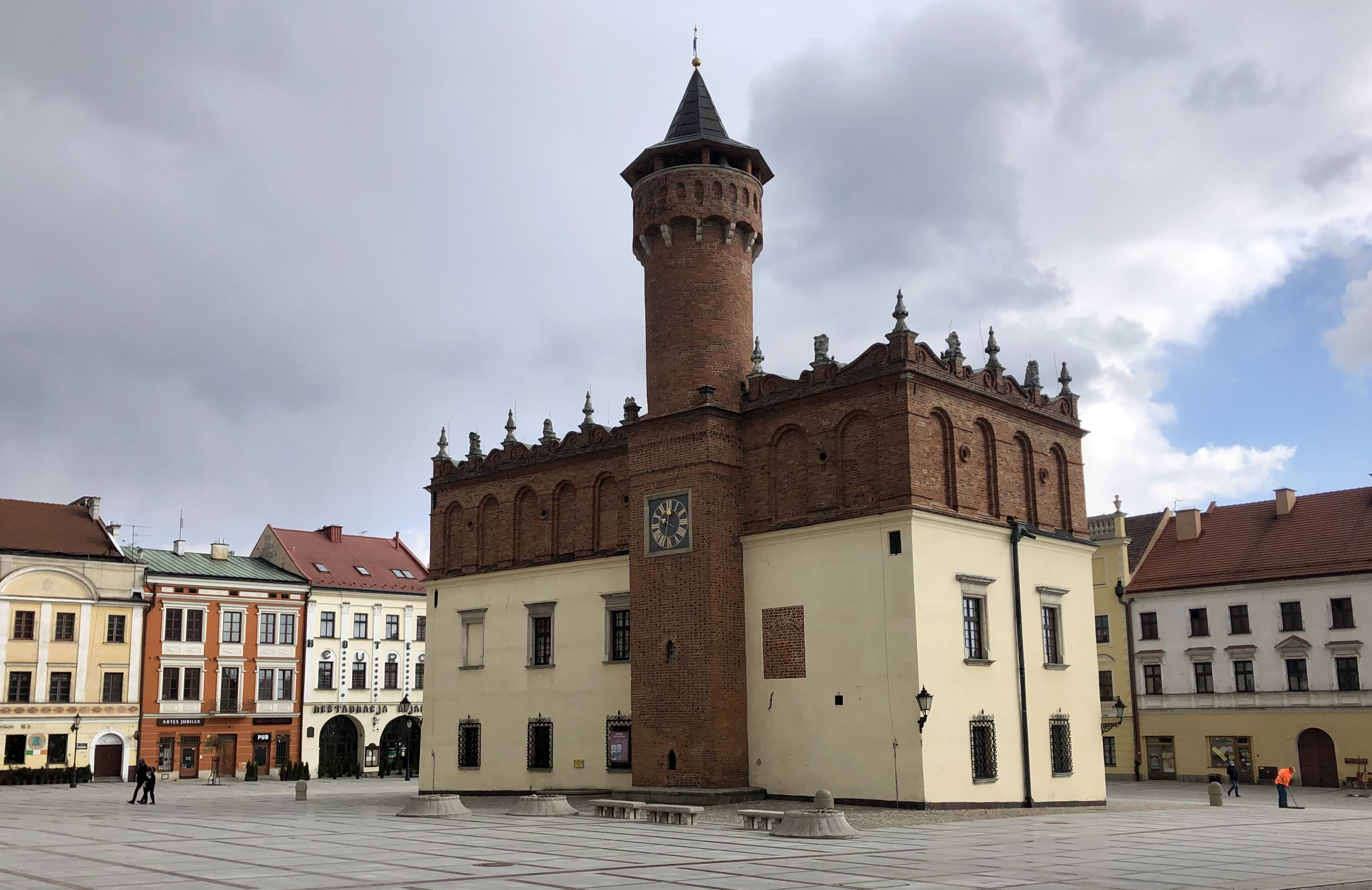

General information
- Location: Tarnów
- Coordinates: 50°00′44.9″N 20°59′18.2″E
- Year(s) built: 15th-16th century

The Tarnów Town Hall is a 15th century town hall in Tarnów, Poland. It is on the register of monuments in Poland.

The town hall is located in Tarnów's market square.

== History ==
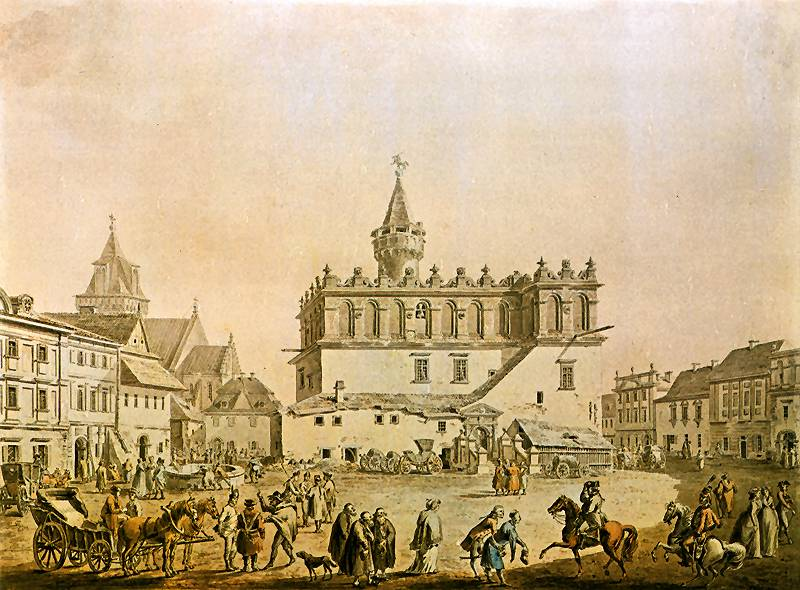
Watercolor by Zygmunt Vogel

The town hall was initially constructed in the 15th century. Geographer Mieczysław Orłowicz mentions that it was redesigned in the 16th century by J. M. Padovano, an architect who had been summoned to Tarnów by Jan Tarnowski. This new design featured elements such as an attic in the Renaissance style.

Zygmunt Vogel produced a watercolor of the town hall around 1800.

During World War I, the town hall was damaged by Austrian artillery during the Gorlice–Tarnów offensive.

== Architecture ==
The structure features the attic, portals, and mascarons.

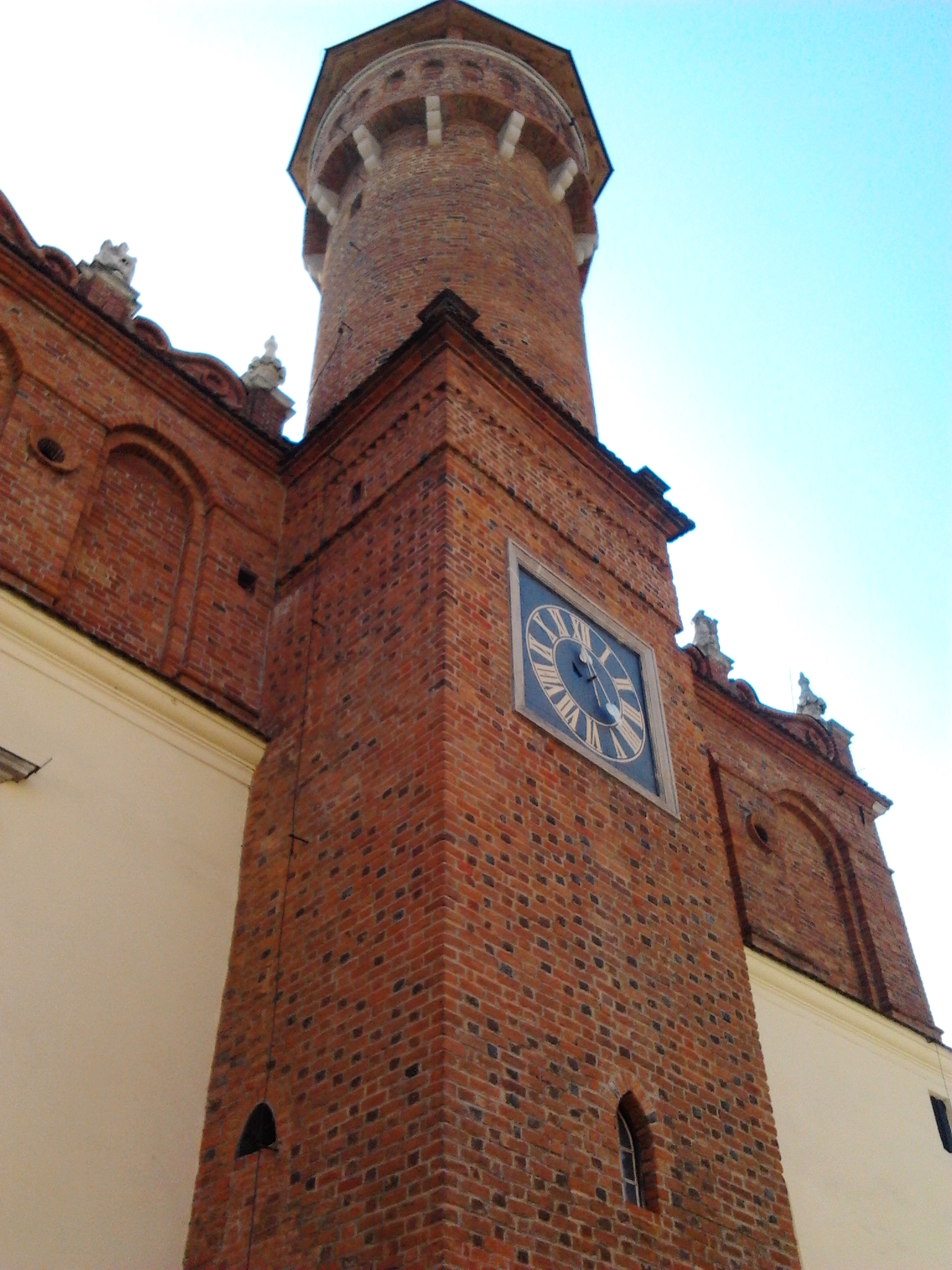
Attic with tower and clock

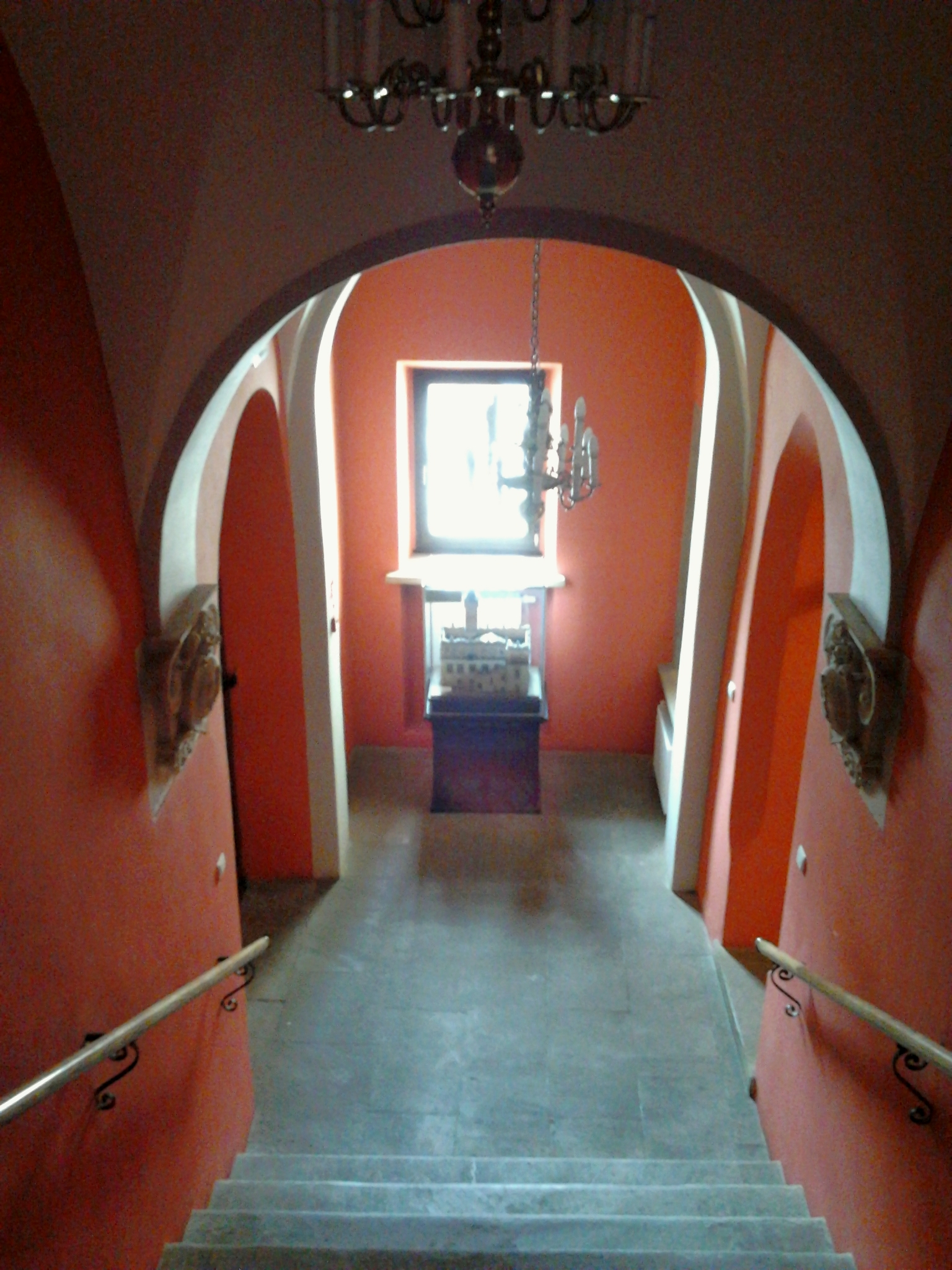
Interior

== See also ==
- Gothic architecture in modern Poland
- Renaissance in Poland
