= Vincenzo Catena =

Italian painter

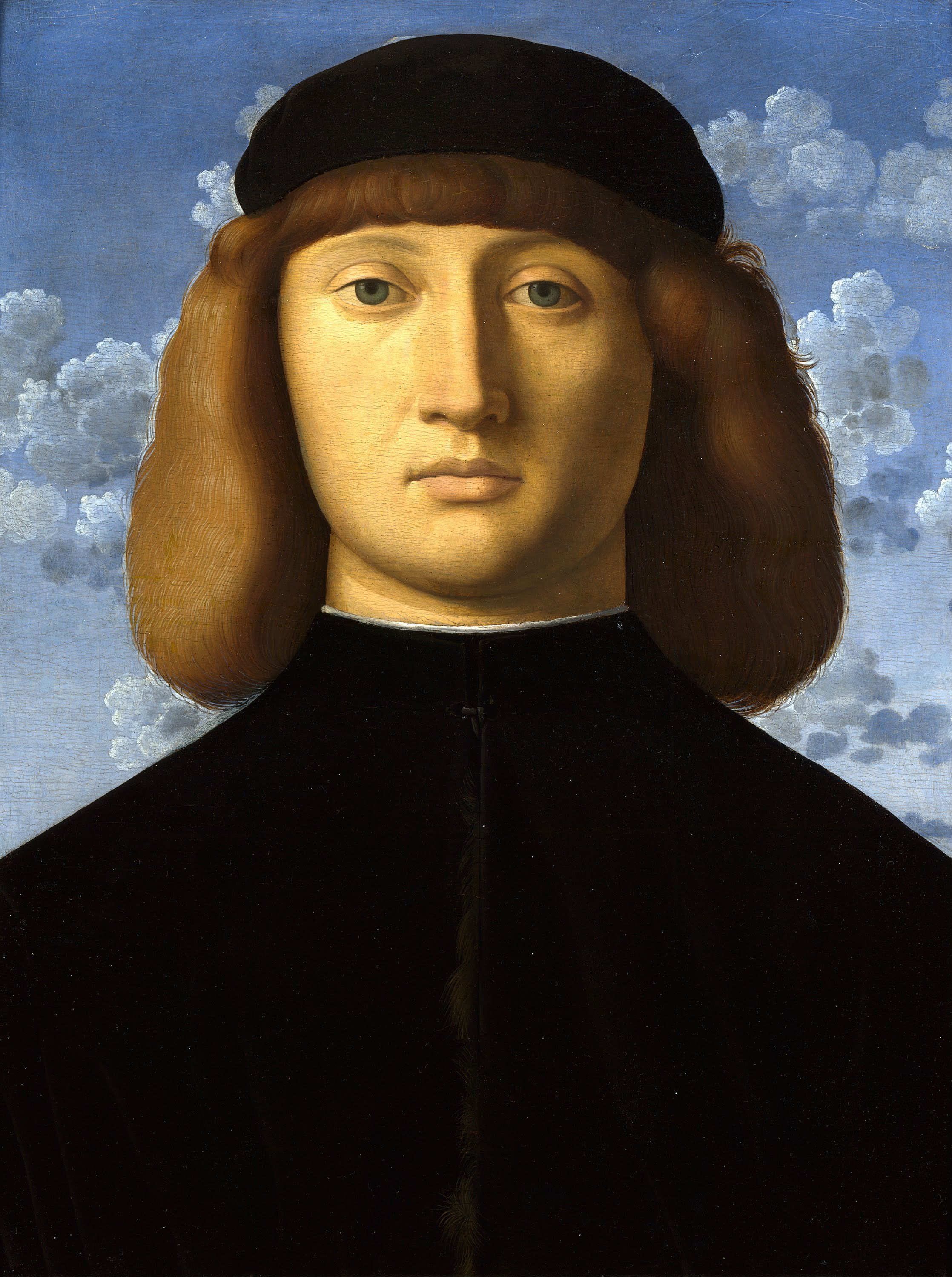
- Portrait of a Young Man
- Born: c. 1480; Italy
- Died: 1531; Italy
- Education: Venetian school
- Occupation: Painter

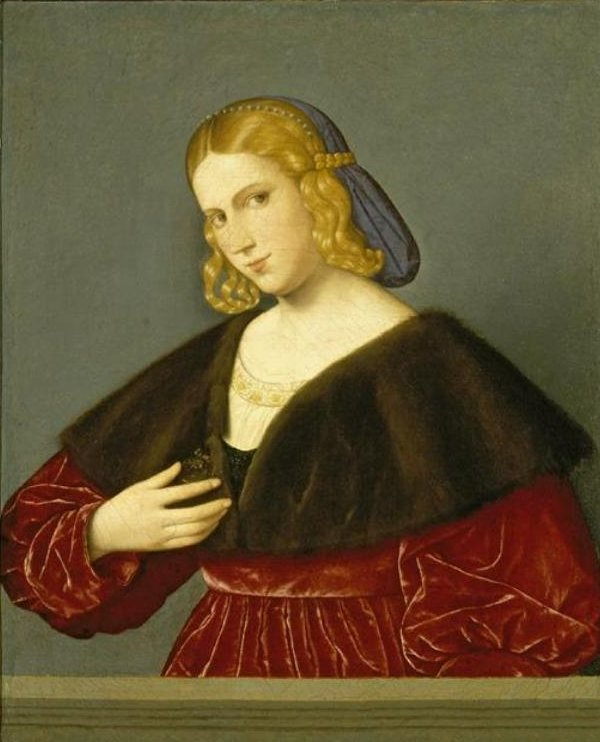
Portrait of a Woman, painting by Vincenzo Catena, ca. 1520, El Paso Museum of Art

Vincenzo Catena (c. 1480–1531) was an Italian painter of the Renaissance Venetian school. He is also known as Vincenzo de Biagio.

== Life ==
Nothing is known of the date and place of Catena's birth. The earliest known record of him is in an inscription on the back of Giorgione's Laura, in which he is described as the painter's Cholego. Catena's early style is however, much closer to that of Giovanni Bellini than the innovative work of Giorgione, and it was not until a few years after Giorgione's death in 1510 that his influence began to show itself in Catena's output. There are about a dozen signed paintings by Catena in existence, although only one of these, the Martyrdom of St Christina (1520) in the church of Santa Maria Mater Domini in Venice, can be dated with any certainty, from an inscription on its marble surround. Catena's wills indicate that he was a man of some wealth, and that he had friends in Venetian humanist circles.

== Sources ==
- Web Gallery of Art
- Adoration of the Shepherds
