= Francesco Minorello =

Italian painter

Francesco Minorello or Menorelo (1624-1657) was an Italian painter of the Baroque period active mainly in Padua.

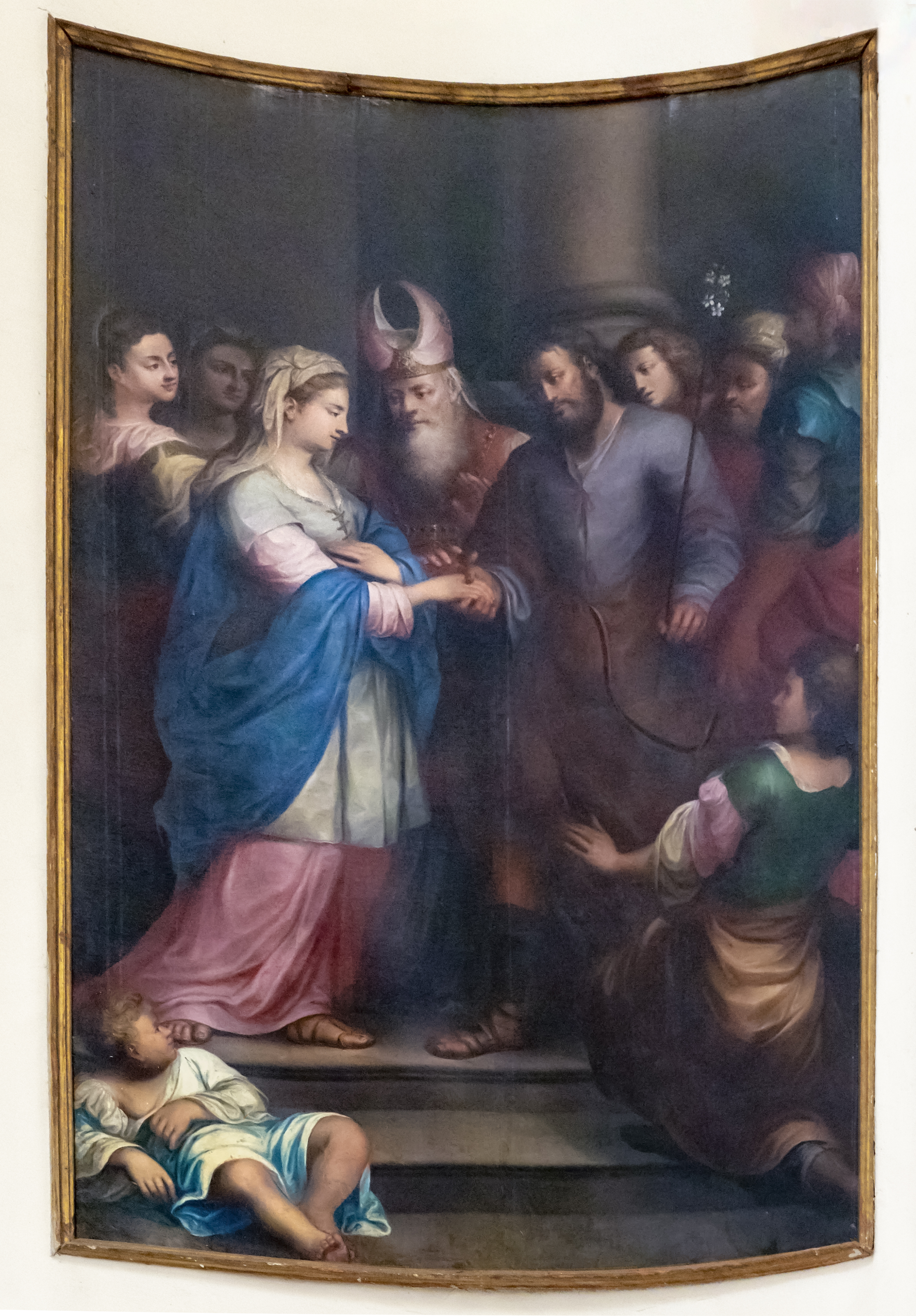
The Marriage of the Virgin Padua Cathedral

== Biography ==
He was born in Conselve, but trained with Luca da Reggio, along with Giulio Cirello who also practiced in Padua. He was from the same family that produced artists Giovanni Battista and Orsola Minorello.

Francesco died young at either 32 or 33. He painted two canvases, St Agnes at the Gallows and St Agnes refusing Gifts, for the church of Sant 'Agnese in Padua and a Mission of the Apostles for the church of Santa Maria della Consolazione in Este.
