= Giulio Cirello =

Italian painter

Giulio Cirello (1633 in Padua – 1709) was an Italian painter.

He trained under Luca Ferrari in Padua. He mainly painted sacred subjects in a late-Baroque style, though he was also valued as portraitist during his time. He painted an altarpiece for the church of San Giuseppe in Padua. He painted the walls of the Palazzo Vescovile or the Bishop's palace, adjacent to the Padua Cathedral; and two pieces for the church of La Rotonda in Rovigo. Along with the fellow Luca da Reggio pupil, Francesco Minorello, he painted two canvases, depicting St Agnes beaten by the Roman Prefect and St Martha as a Nun holding the cross sprays holy water on a Dragon, for the church of Sant'Agnese in Padua.

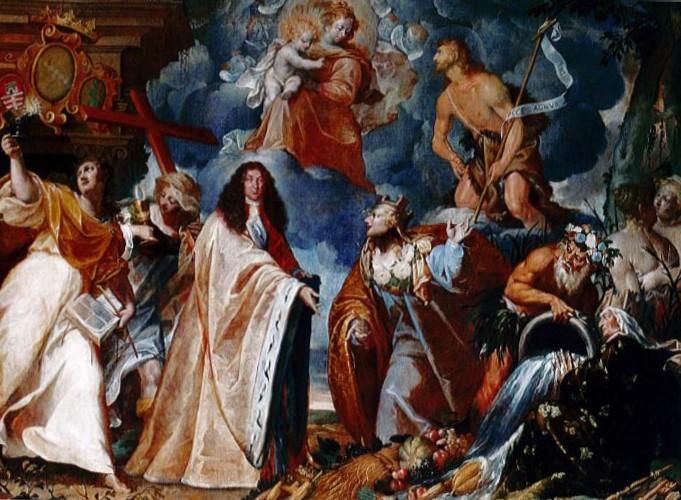
Glory of Giovanni Battista Foscarini (1678)
