= Sant'Agnese, Padua =

Church building in Padua, Italy

Coordinates: 45°24′36.66″N 11°52′23.7″E

Sant'Agnese is a 14th-century Roman Catholic former church located on via Sant'Agnese corner via Dante in the city of Padua in the region of Veneto, Italy. The church deconsecrated in the 1949s, was sold in 2011 to convert to residential units.

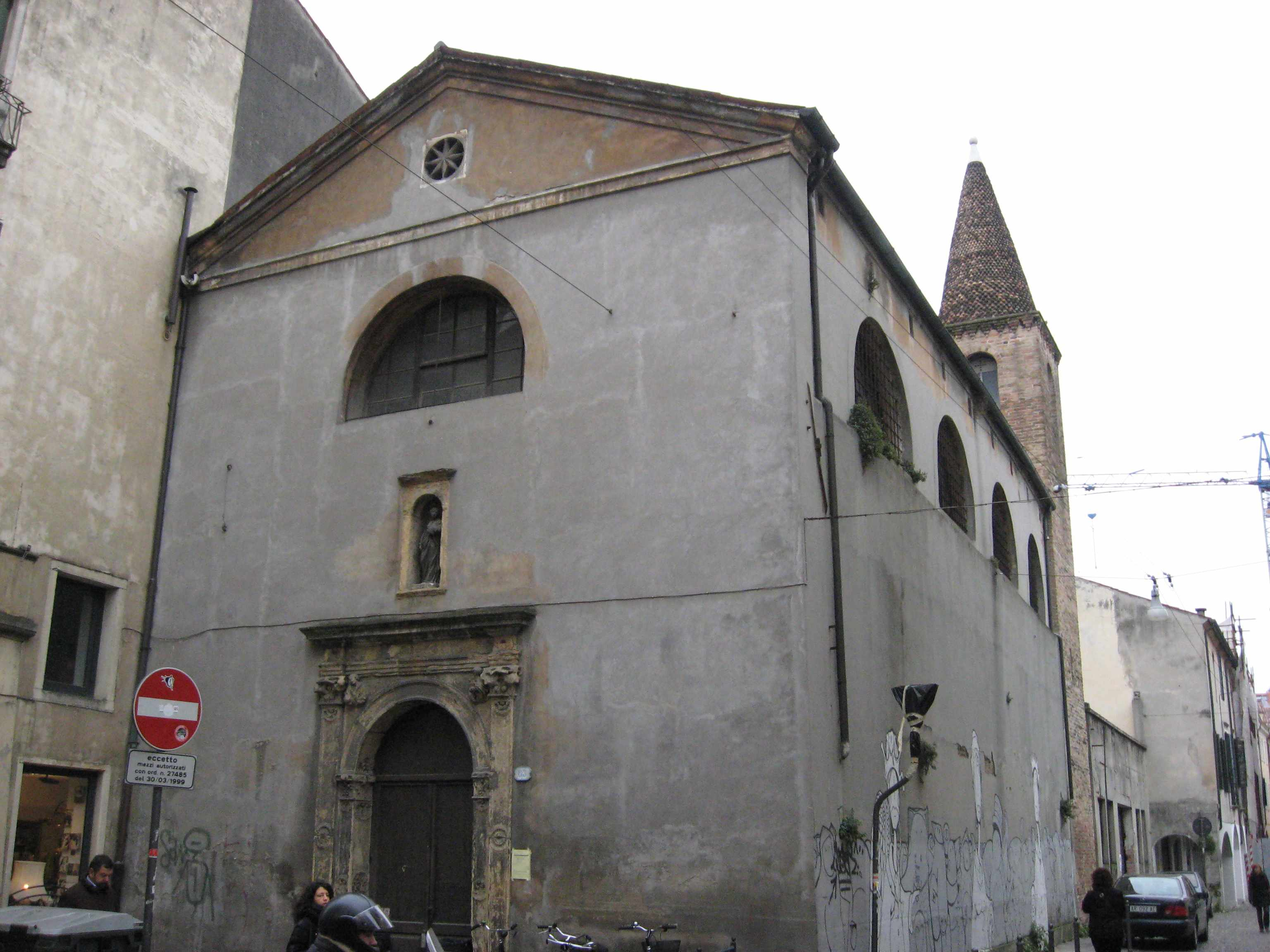
Facade of church with Renaissance portal

== History ==
A church was present here by the 12th century, but the present structure, except for the still standing Romanesque bell-tower, with a steep conical roof, was erected starting in 1362. The facade is from the 16th century. The portico and adjacent vicariate was removed in the 20th-century. The Renaissance portal is still in place was complete by Giovanni Maria Mosca.

The interior decoration has all been stripped. An inventory from 1817 records:

- The first canvas on the right depicting the Martyrdom of Sant'Agnese at the Gallows by Francesco Minorello.
- The first altarpiece on the right depicting a Virgin and Child with St Joseph above and below Saints Francesca Romana and Eurosia (1777), by Domenico Tiepolo with the help of Giovanni Battista Mengardi.
- Another canvas depicting St Agnes beaten by the Roman Prefect by Giulio Cirello.
- Another canvas depicting St Agnes refusing Gifts by Francesco Minorello.
- The third altar had a St Martha as a Nun holding the cross sprays holy water on a Dragon by Giulio Cirello.

The abbot Gasparo Patriarchi, author of the Vocabolario Veneziano e Padovano (1775), was buried here. The musical organ (1899) by Domenico Malvestio was moved to the parish church of Valle San Giorgio, in Baone.
