= Luca Ferrari =

Italian painter (1605–1654)

Luca Ferrari (February 17, 1605 – February 8, 1654) was an Italian painter of the Baroque period.

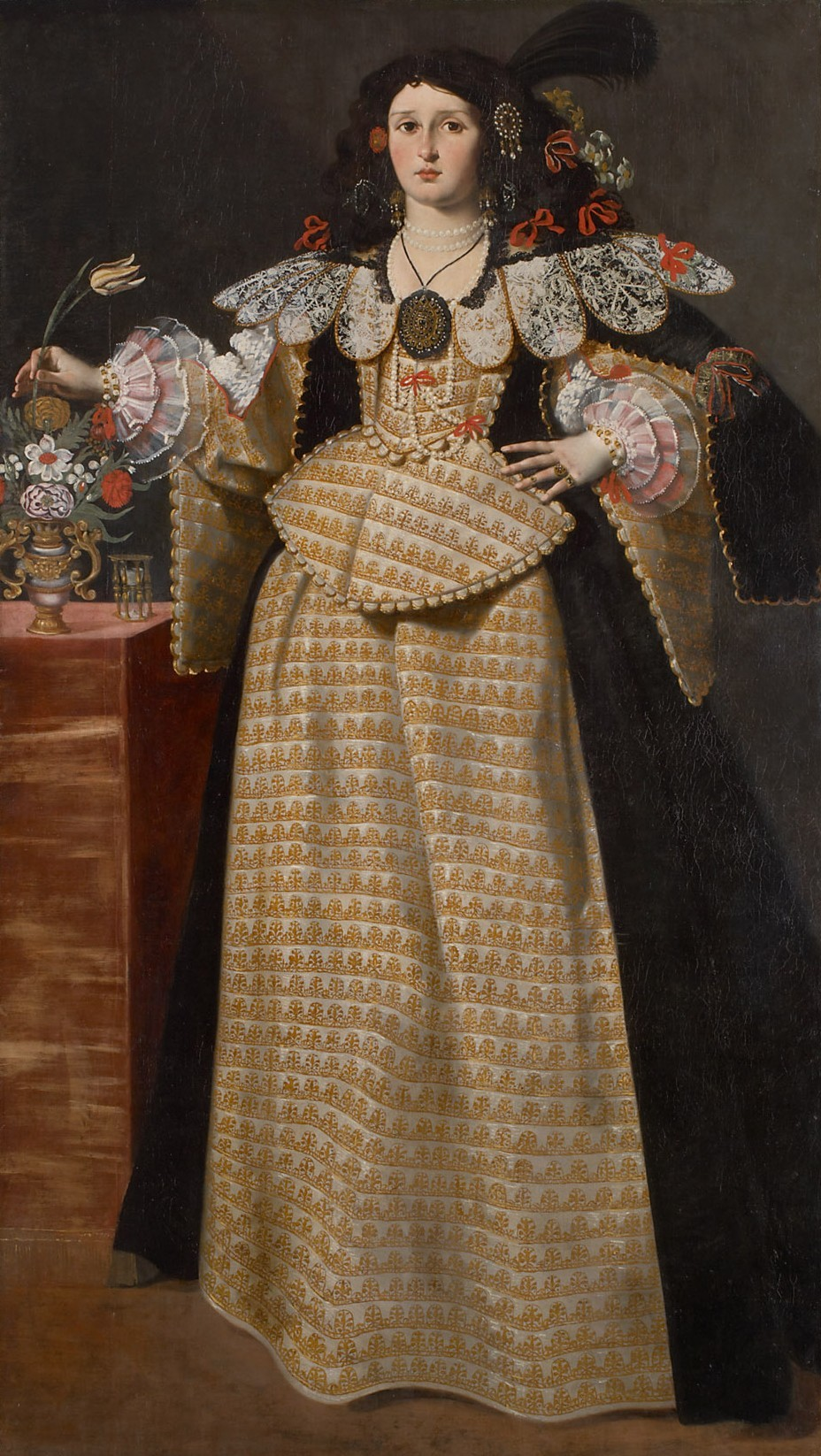
Portrait of a Lady, 1630s

== Biography ==
Also called Luca da Reggio. He was reputedly initially a trainee of Alessandro Tiarini. Moschini identifies him as a pupil of Guido Reni. He later worked with Leonello Spada, Alessandro Tiarini, and Carlo Bononi in the 1610 - 1620s were decorating the basilica of the Madonna della Ghiara in his native city of Reggio Emilia. In 1635 he joined the Fraglia dei pittori of Padua for two years. He frescoed episodes of the Life of Antenore (1650) for the Villa Selvatico at Battaglia Terme, and in the following years he painted seven panels depicting the Mysteries of the Rosary for the ceiling of San Tommaso Cantauriense's church in Padua. He painted both large historical canvases and small cabinet pieces. Among his pupils in Padua was Giulio Cirello. Moschini identifies Giovanni Battista Pelizzari and Francesco Minorello as pupils.
