= Market Square, Tarnów =

Central market square in Tarnów, Poland

Market Square
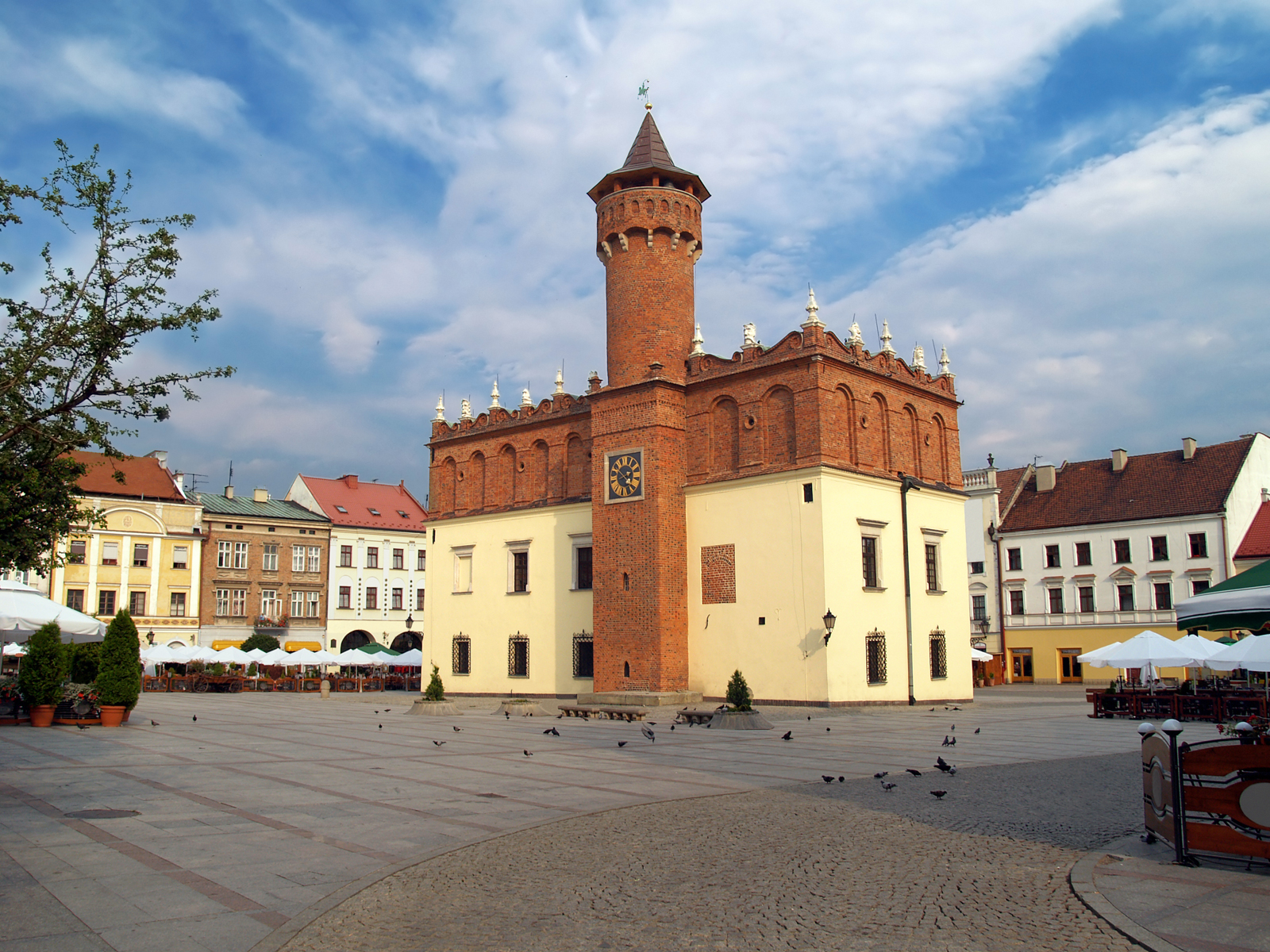
- Market Square viewed from Katedralna Street, with the Tarnów Town Hall in the center

- Location within Poland
- Part of: Old Town
- Location: Tarnów
- Coordinates: 50°0′44.69″N 20°59′16.44″E

The Market Square in Tarnów, Poland, is a historic market square located at the heart of the Old Town. Established during the city's founding in 1330, it was laid out according to medieval urban planning principles. The square is surrounded by tenements built between the 16th and 19th centuries, with a Renaissance town hall as its central landmark.

== History ==
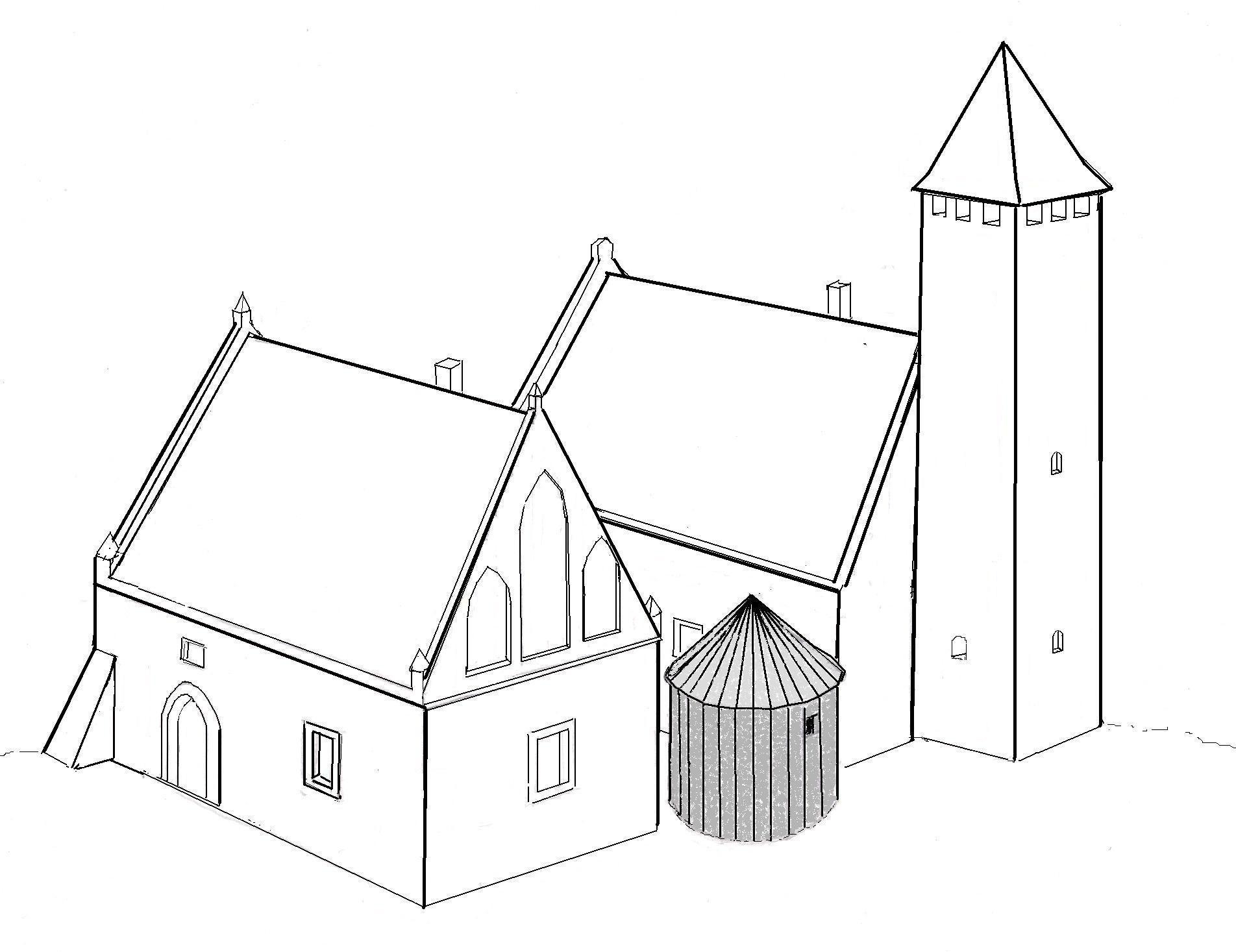
Late Gothic town hall (right, with tower) and adjacent prison, built after 1494

The Market Square was established in 1330 during Tarnów's founding, designed as a rectangular plaza measuring approximately 89.4 m by 74.5 m. Positioned on sloping terrain to facilitate rainwater drainage, it was surrounded by residential plots – nine along the longer sides and five along the shorter ones. As the city's main public and commercial hub, the square hosted weekly markets, and from 1670, annual fairs lasting a week or more. Initially, the square had an unpaved surface with wells at its southwest and northeast corners, supplied by the city's water system from the 15th century. Surrounding wooden structures and market stalls filled the plaza.

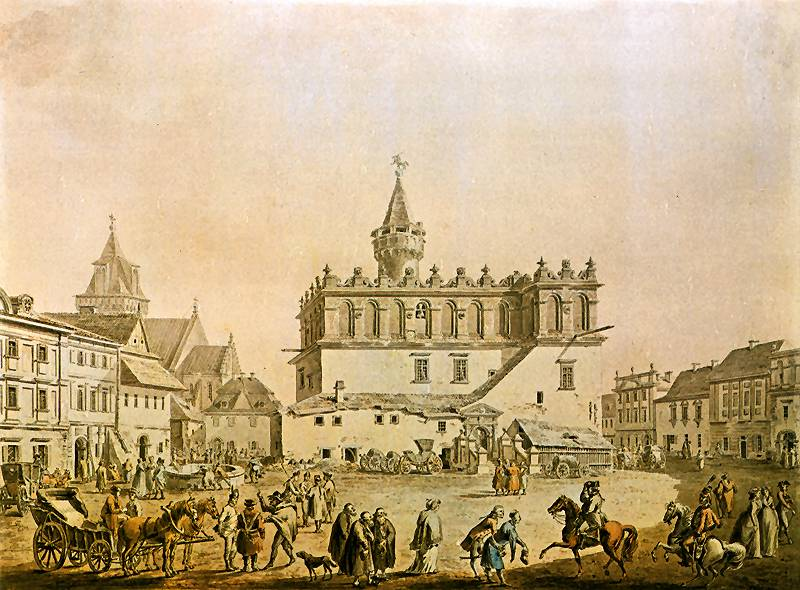
Market Square and town hall in 1800, by Zygmunt Vogel

In the 15th century, partially or fully brick-built, single-story houses began to appear. Fires in the 15th century destroyed the square's commercial structures and much of its surrounding buildings. During reconstruction, the building line was shifted inward, transforming the square's appearance. A brick town hall was erected at its center, and in the 16th century, the houses evolved into grand Renaissance multi-story tenements with arcades. Under Hetman Jan Tarnowski, the town hall was rebuilt, and a weigh house building was later added.

A 1663 fire devastated the town hall and surrounding structures during a period of economic decline. The town hall was quickly rebuilt, but the tenements were restored slowly, often more modestly. The 18th century brought further crises, with fires in 1735 destroying the entire city. A 1738 inspection noted four vacant plots and seven abandoned houses around the square. Subsequent fires further damaged the square's buildings.

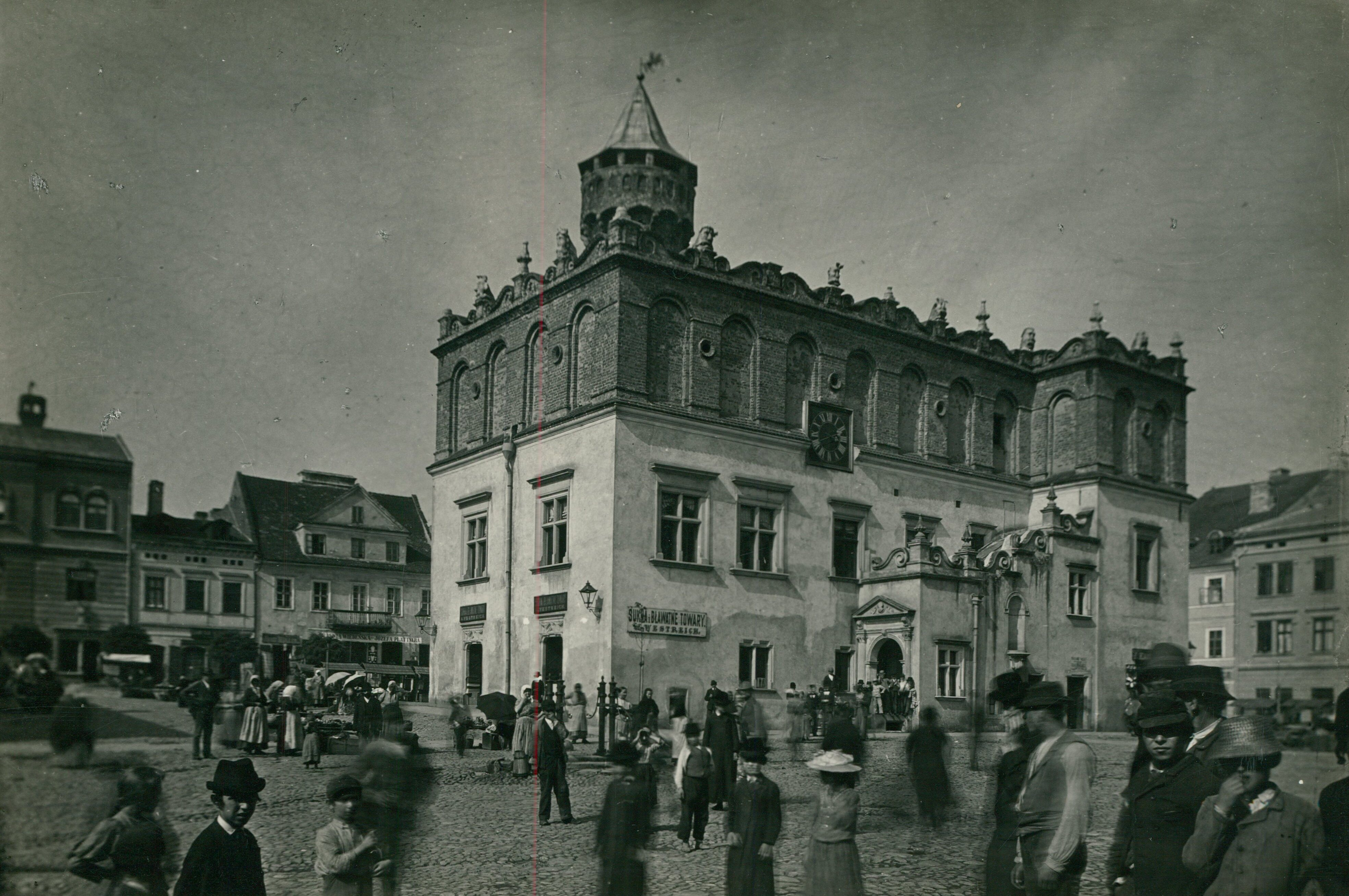
Market Square circa 1905

From the mid-18th century, the tenements were gradually rebuilt, but economic hardship altered their character. Many Renaissance arcaded tenements were replaced with simpler late-Baroque or Classical tenements. The southern side's arcades were demolished, and those on the shorter sides were walled up, with only three northern tenements retaining their arcades. Plot boundaries shifted due to mergers and subdivisions. The most prominent building became the Sanguszko family's Classical two-story urban palace. Fires in 1792, 1813, and 1814 again damaged the town hall and surrounding structures. Rebuilt tenements often gained new interiors, facades, or additional stories. By the outbreak of World War I, most tenements were owned by Jewish residents.

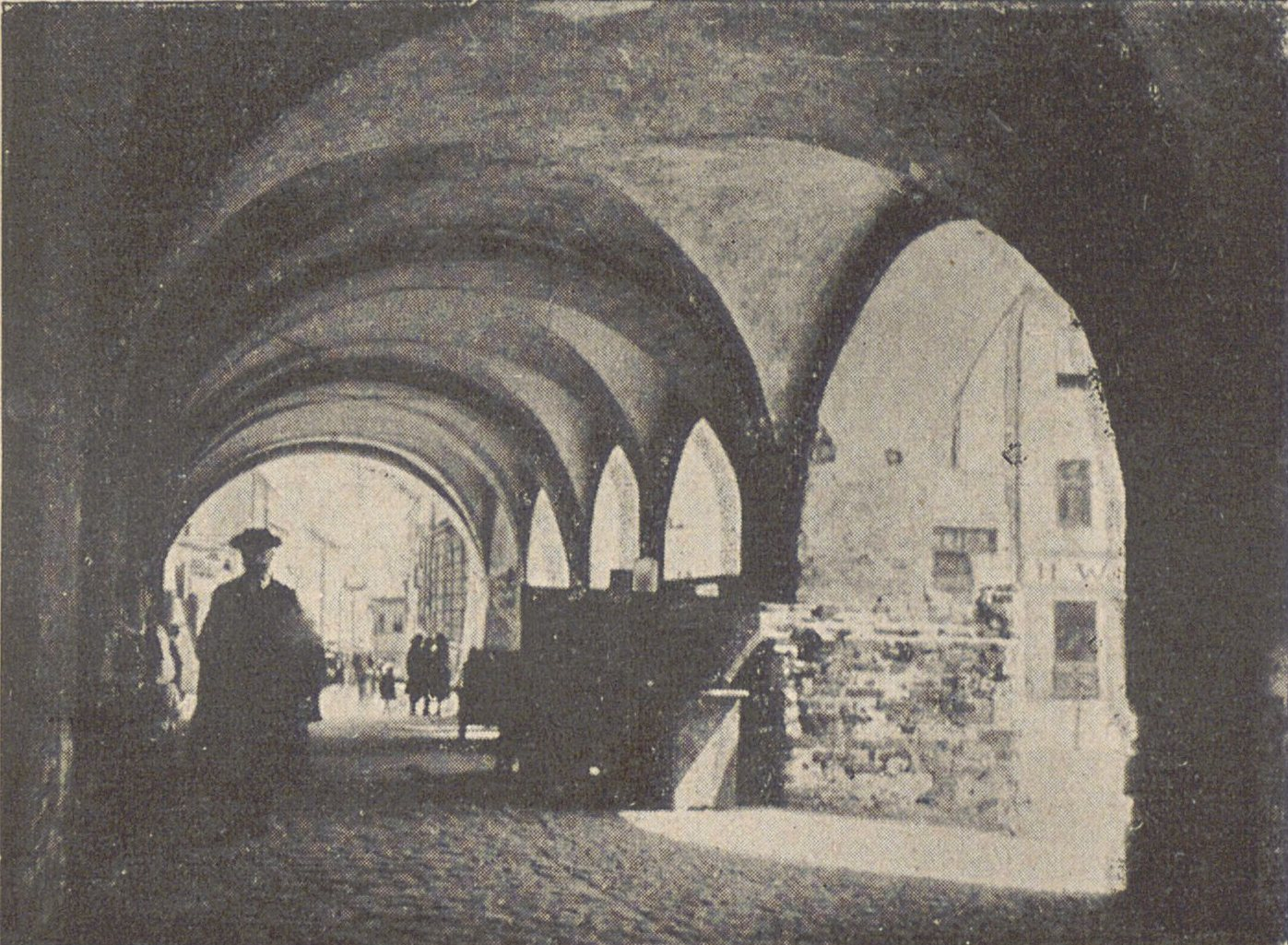
Arcades of northern tenements circa 1929

Throughout the 19th and early 20th centuries, the condition of the square's buildings improved, with renovated tenements receiving new Historicist facades. The town hall underwent a major renovation and reconstruction from 1889 to 1892. The square's wells were closed between 1909 and 1910 after a new water system was built. Parts of the square were paved with river stones, likely from the 18th century, and between 1887 and 1888, the entire surface was repaved with river stone cobbles, with sidewalks added along all sides. During the interwar period, no significant changes occurred. In 1931, the town hall was transferred to the museum after municipal offices relocated. In 1934, Tarnów's downtown, including the Market Square, was listed in the register of monuments.

During the German occupation, all Jewish residents were expelled from the square's tenements. Between 11 and 19 June 1942, Nazi forces murdered approximately 3,000 Jews from the Tarnów Ghetto in the square and nearby streets. In 1942, the square's cobblestone surface was replaced with trylinka concrete tiles. After World War II, the square lost its commercial role. In the 1960s, a conservation program was planned for the square's buildings, but it was only partially completed. Some tenements and the town hall regained their historic character, and two wells were reconstructed. Between 1996 and 1998, the square's surface was renovated. The vehicle-free section was paved with granite slabs, and the area around the town hall was relaid with river stone cobbles.

== Present day ==
The Market Square remains Tarnów's most prominent public space, part of the downtown urban layout listed in the register of monuments. The historic town hall stands at its center, surrounded by tenements built between the 16th and 19th centuries. The most significant are the Renaissance arcaded tenements in the northern row. Every day at noon, the Tarnów hymn, composed by Stanisław Rzepecki, is played from the town hall tower.

== Architecture ==
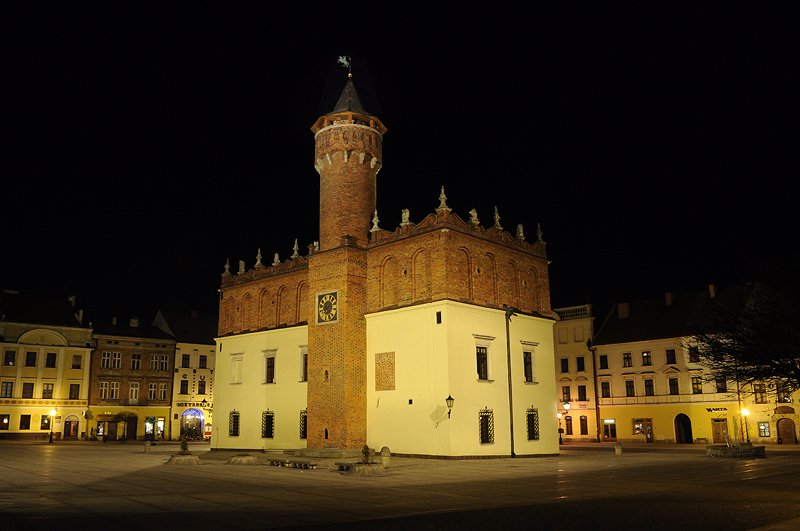
Town Hall at night

=== Town Hall ===
The first Gothic town hall was built in the center of the Market Square in the late 14th century. The current structure, a blend of Mannerist and Renaissance architecture, evolved through renovations from the 15th to 16th centuries. This rectangular, two-story building features a tower with a cantilevered walkway supported by brackets. The tower is topped with a steep roof, crowned by a metal emblem of the Sanguszko family's Lithuanian Chase coat of arms. The facade is adorned with an attic, its crest decorated with stone mascarons and pinnacles. The town hall now houses a branch of the Tarnów Regional Museum.

=== Tenements ===
==== Western row ====
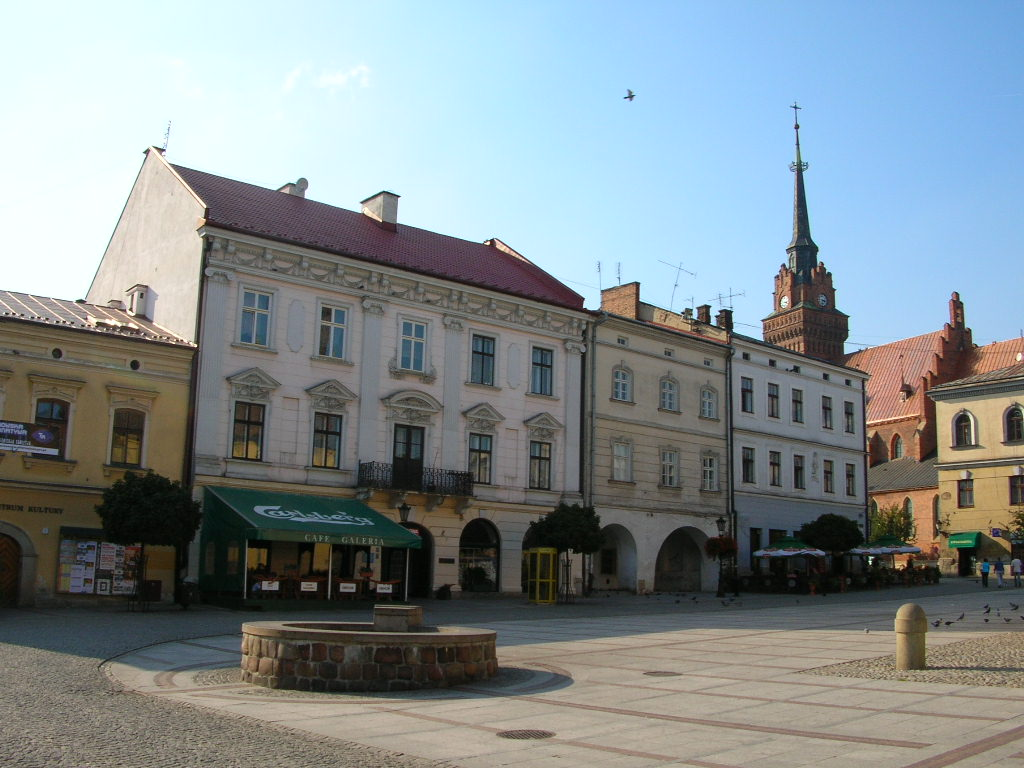
Tenements on the western side of the Market Square

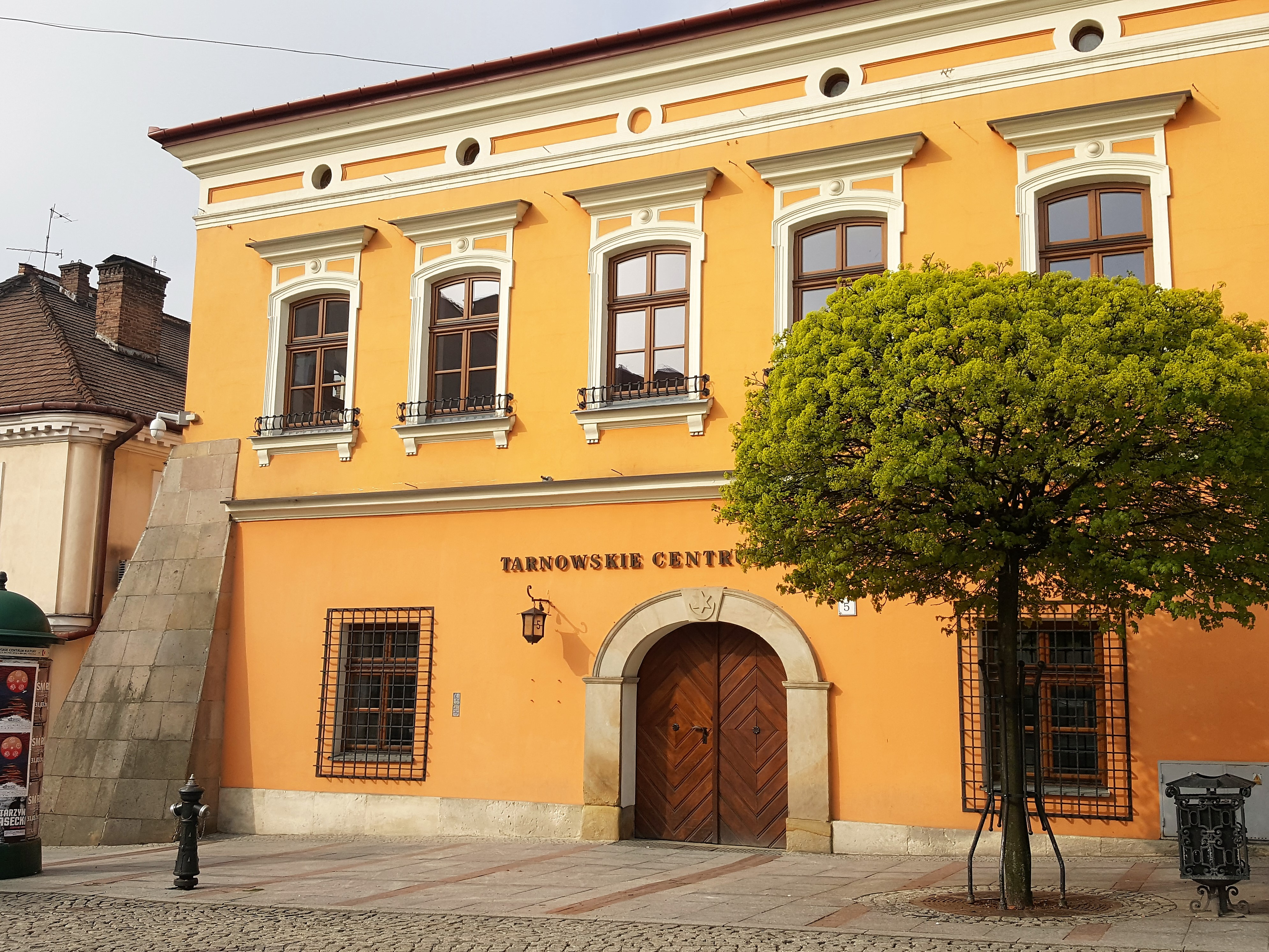
Ratajewiczowska tenement

This continuous row, between Cathedral Square to the north and Krótka Street to the south, comprises the front facades of four tenements from the 15th to 16th century, later rebuilt. The houses are numbered 2 to 5 from north to south:

- Saint Florian tenement (2 Rynek Street/8 Cathedral Square): A two-story tenement at the northwest corner, featuring a statue of Saint Florian on its facade. The ground floor retains 16th-century vaulted ceilings with decorative paintings. Built in the 16th century with an arcade over older basements, it was partially rebuilt in the 18th century, with the arcade incorporated into the ground floor. Before 1837, the Baroque portal was removed, and the Saint Florian statue was added. A second story was added in 1929, giving it its current form.
- Rosowska tenement (3 Rynek Street): A two-story tenement with an arcaded porch. Constructed in the 16th century with a vaulted arcade, it replaced an earlier wooden house. Later renovations removed the arcade and altered the second story. A major restoration from 1968 to 1970 reopened the arcade and rebuilt the second story. Since 2013, it has housed the Tarnów Regional Museum. It was listed in the Lesser Poland Voivodeship's register of monuments in 2007.
- Nikielsonowska tenement (4 Rynek Street): A two-story, vaulted tenement with a neo-Renaissance facade. Its rear outbuildings form the Tertila Passage, connecting to Casimir the Great Square. The basements date to the 15th century. Built in the late 16th century with an arcade, it collapsed after fires in 1735 and 1743. Rebuilt in the mid-18th century as a Classical two-story house for the Sanguszko family, it later served as a noble court (Forum Romanum) from 1796 to 1826, then as a bishop's palace until 1912. Mayor Tadeusz Tertil converted it into a tenement with commercial ground-floor spaces, linking its outbuildings to a new structure in 1913 to form the passage. Listed in the register of monuments in 2004, it has housed the Pasaż Odkryć science and technology center since 2022. A statue of Tadeusz Tertil, created by Arkadiusz Latos, was unveiled at the passage entrance on 30 October 2018.
- Ratajewiczka tenement (5 Rynek Street): A single-story tenement at the southwestern corner, facing Krótka Street. Considered one of Tarnów's oldest tenements, it retains late-14th to early-15th-century vaulted basements and a Gothic stone portal at the basement entrance. Its neo-Renaissance facade features decorative elements. Built around 1400, it was set back one bay from the current building line. An arcade with pointed arches was added in the late 15th to early 16th century. Fires in 1663 and 1735 caused damage, leading to the arcade's closure and a Baroque-Classical gable. Artillery damage in 1915 altered the roof. A conservation renovation from 1980 to 1992 adapted it for the Tarnów Cultural Center.

==== Southern row ====
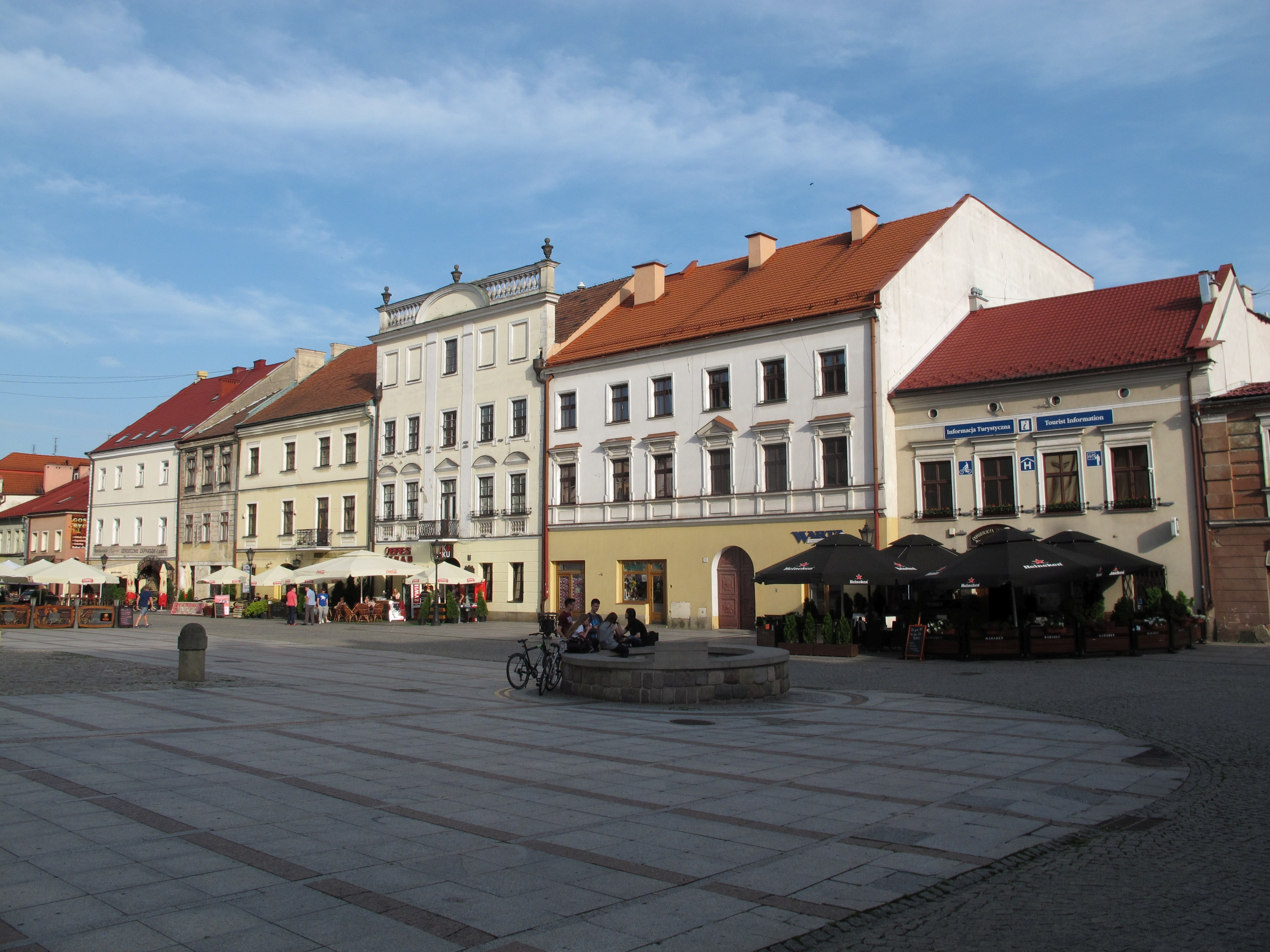
Tenements on the southern side

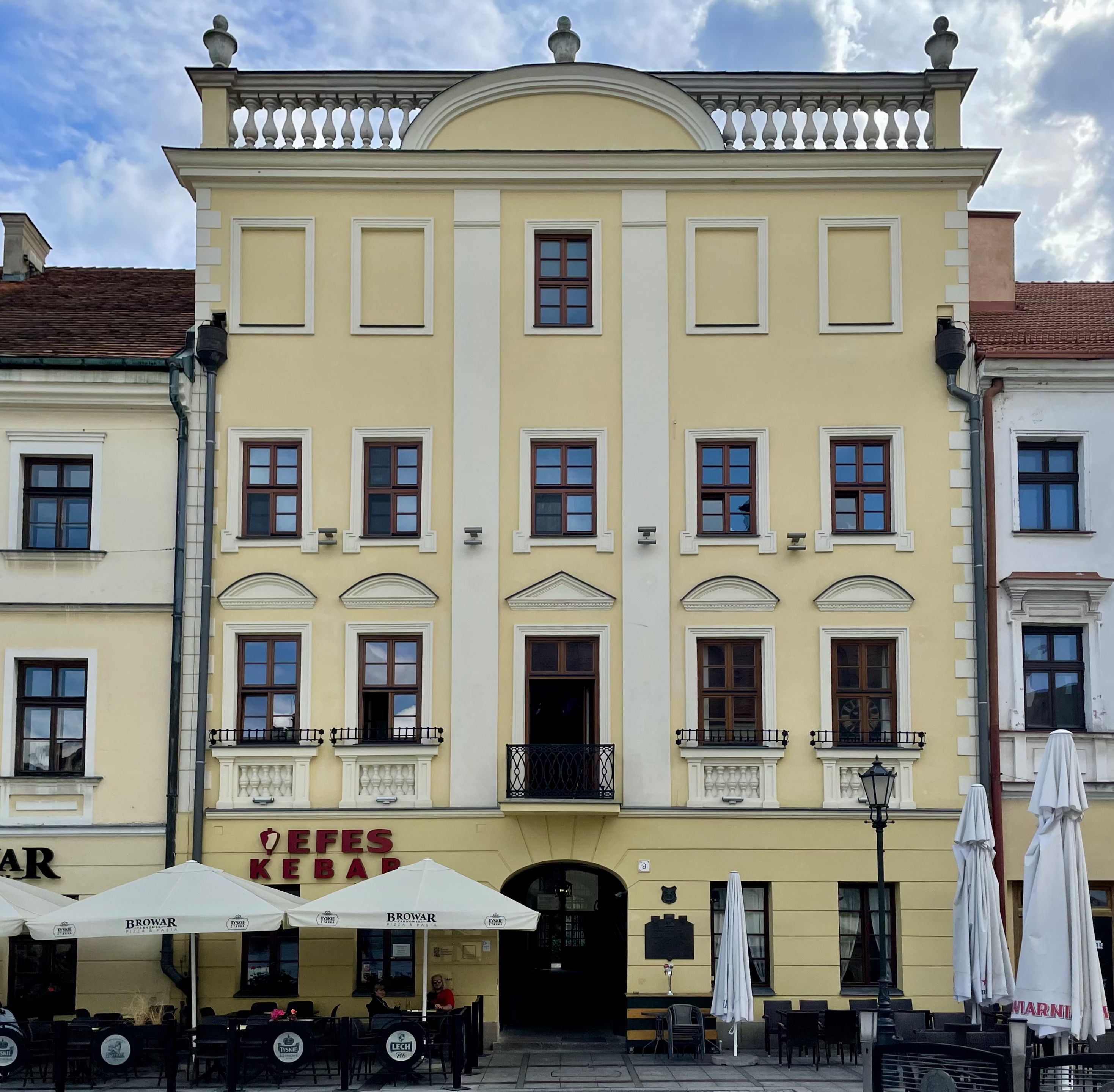
Tenement at 9 Rynek Street

This continuous row, between the Great Stairs to the west and Zakątna Street to the east, consists of seven tenements. They are numbered 6 to 12 from west to east:

- Tenement at 6 Rynek Street: A corner, single-story tenement at the southwest, facing the Great Stairs. It retains a 16th-century tiled basements. Its neo-Renaissance facade was shaped in the 19th century. A 2009 fire killed two people, and renovations began in 2017.
- Tenement at 7 Rynek Street: A single-story tenement with a neo-Renaissance facade from the early 20th century. It houses the Tarnów Tourist Information Center.
- Tenement at 8 Rynek Street: A two-story, vaulted tenement with a neo-Renaissance facade and original panelled gate. It combines two 15th–16th-century buildings. A 1814 fire prompted rebuilding, with a second story added and the facade reshaped by 1896. A 1960s renovation restored the facade and interiors. Listed in 1996.
- Tenement at 9 Rynek Street: A two-story tenement with a Baroque-Classical facade topped by a high attic. Built in the mid-18th century after demolishing an earlier structure, it was rebuilt after a 1743 fire. A second story was added before 1800, but the attic was removed in the 1920s. A 1977–1979 renovation restored the attic. A 2015 plaque commemorates Roman Dzieślewski, a pioneer of Polish electrical engineering. It houses local offices of Radio Kraków and TVP Kraków. Listed in 1993.
- Technika House (10 Rynek Street): A two-story tenement with a Classical facade from a 1931–1932 renovation. Its basements, some from the 17th century, include vaulted chambers. Listed in 1995.
- Tenement at 11 Rynek Street: A three-story, vaulted tenement with a 19th-century facade. Likely built in the 15th century with an arcade, it was rebuilt without one after fires. A second story was added after 1830.
- Tenement at 12 Rynek Street: A corner, two-story tenement at the southeast, facing Zakątna Street. Its basements date to the 16th century. Built around that time, it was rebuilt multiple times after fires, gaining its current form in the mid-19th century with a second story. Listed in 1995.

==== Eastern row ====
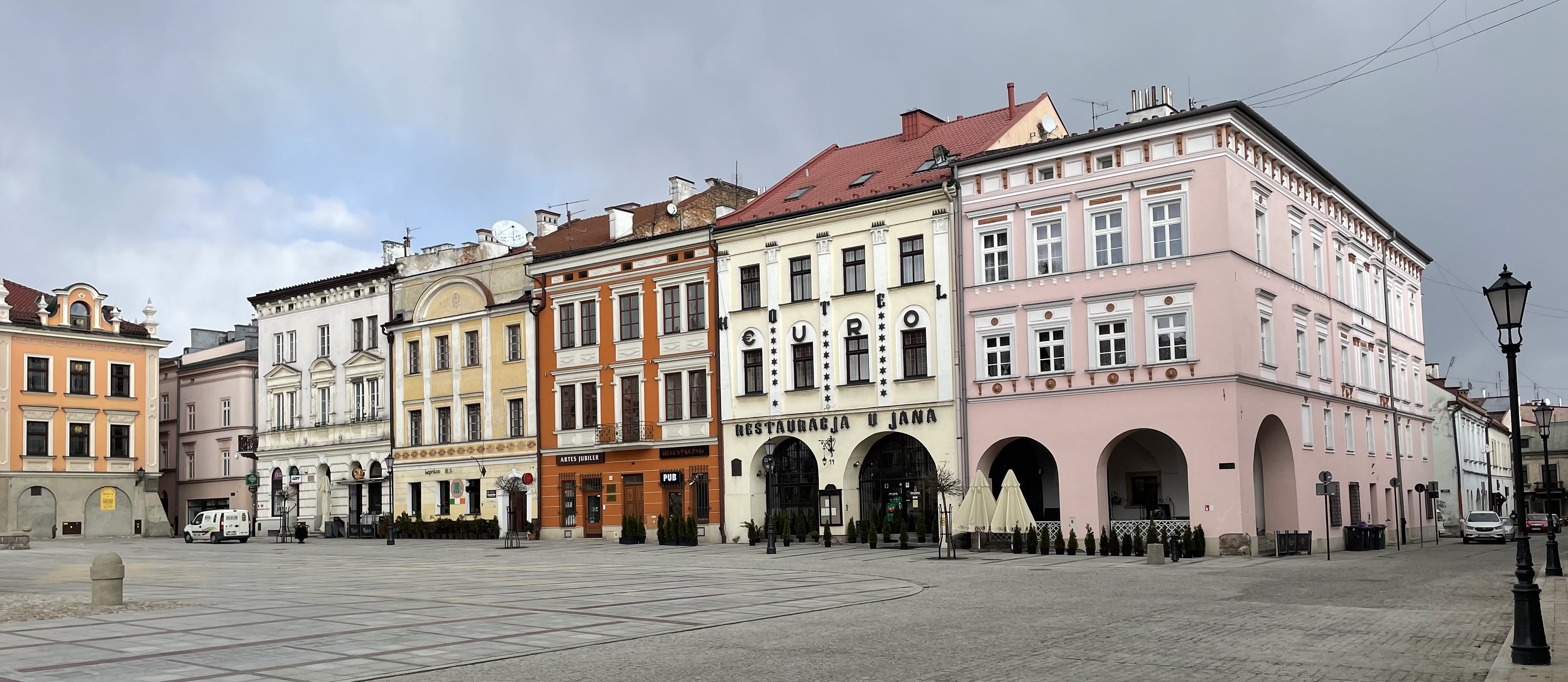
Tenements on the eastern side of the Market Square

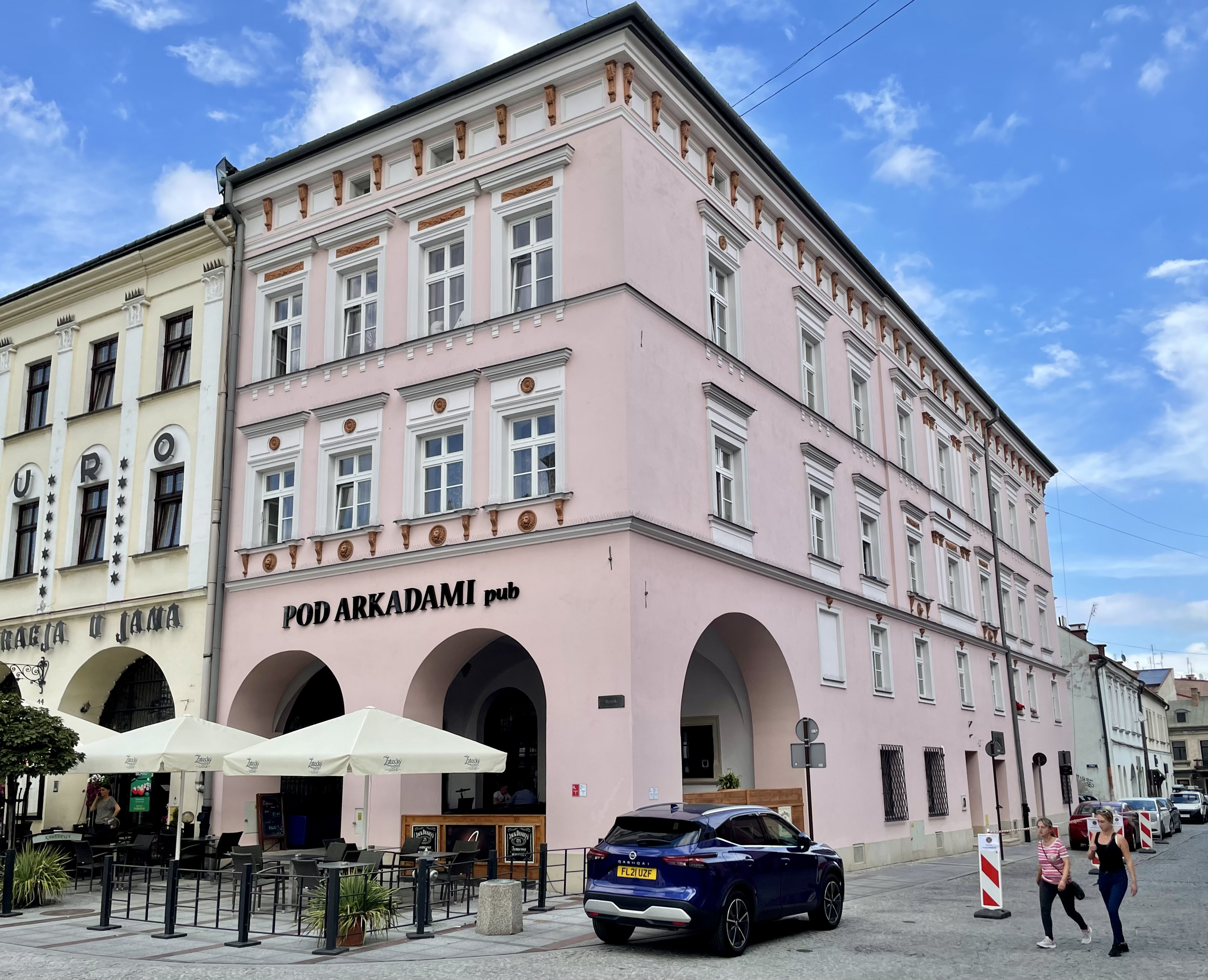
Sakowiczowska tenement

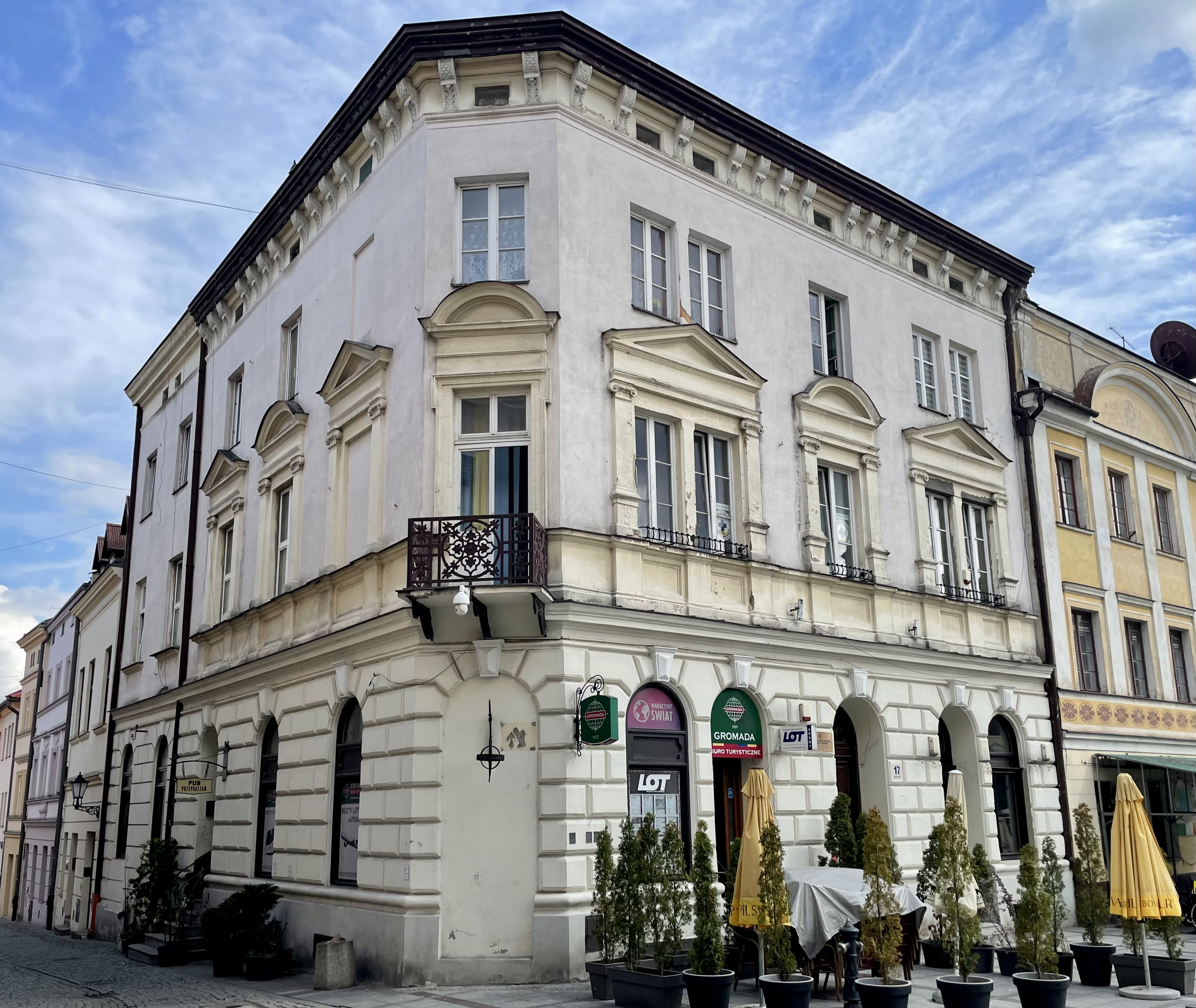
Tenement at 17 Rynek Street

The eastern row comprises five 16th-century tenements, later rebuilt, between Wekslarska Street to the south and Żydowska Street to the north. All are listed in the register of monuments, numbered 13 to 17 from south to north:

- Sakowiczowska tenement (13 Rynek Street/2 Wekslarska Street): A two-story corner tenement with a Neo-Renaissance facade and arcaded ground floor, facing Wekslarska Street. Built before the late 15th century, it was expanded with an arcaded basement in the 16th century. A 1743 fire damaged the roof and an interior room. By 1796, the arcade was bricked up, and an attic was added. A second floor was added before 1888. During a 1960–1962 renovation, the arcade was restored, and the facade was decorated with paintings. It was listed in 1998.
- Tenement at 14 Rynek Street: A two-story tenement with glassed-in arcaded arches. Rebuilt in the 16th century with an arcade and a second floor, it was damaged in the 1735 fire and rebuilt without the arcade by 1796. A second floor was added in 1866, and the arcade and original interior were restored between 1960 and 1962. From 1767 to 1787, it housed Tarnów's first royal post office, commemorated by a plaque. It now contains a restaurant and hotel. It was listed in 1998.
- Tenement at 15 Rynek Street: A two-story tenement with an eclectic facade from the late 19th to early 20th century. Built in the 16th century, likely with an arcade, it was rebuilt without the arcade after the 1743 fire. A second floor was added between the late 19th and early 20th century, and a balcony was added in 1923. The facade's plaster was removed in the 1960s. It was listed in 1996.
- Tenement at 16 Rynek Street: A two-story tenement with a Baroque-Neoclassical facade. Built or expanded in the 16th century, it was rebuilt without an arcade after the 1734 fire by 1796. A 1960s conservation renovation restored its 18th-century appearance. It was listed in 1993.
- Tenement at 17 Rynek Street: A two-story corner tenement with a Neo-Renaissance facade, facing Żydowska Street. Rebuilt after a 1743 fire by 1796, it was renovated in 1884, with a chamfered corner and a second floor added. It was listed in 1993.

==== Northern row ====
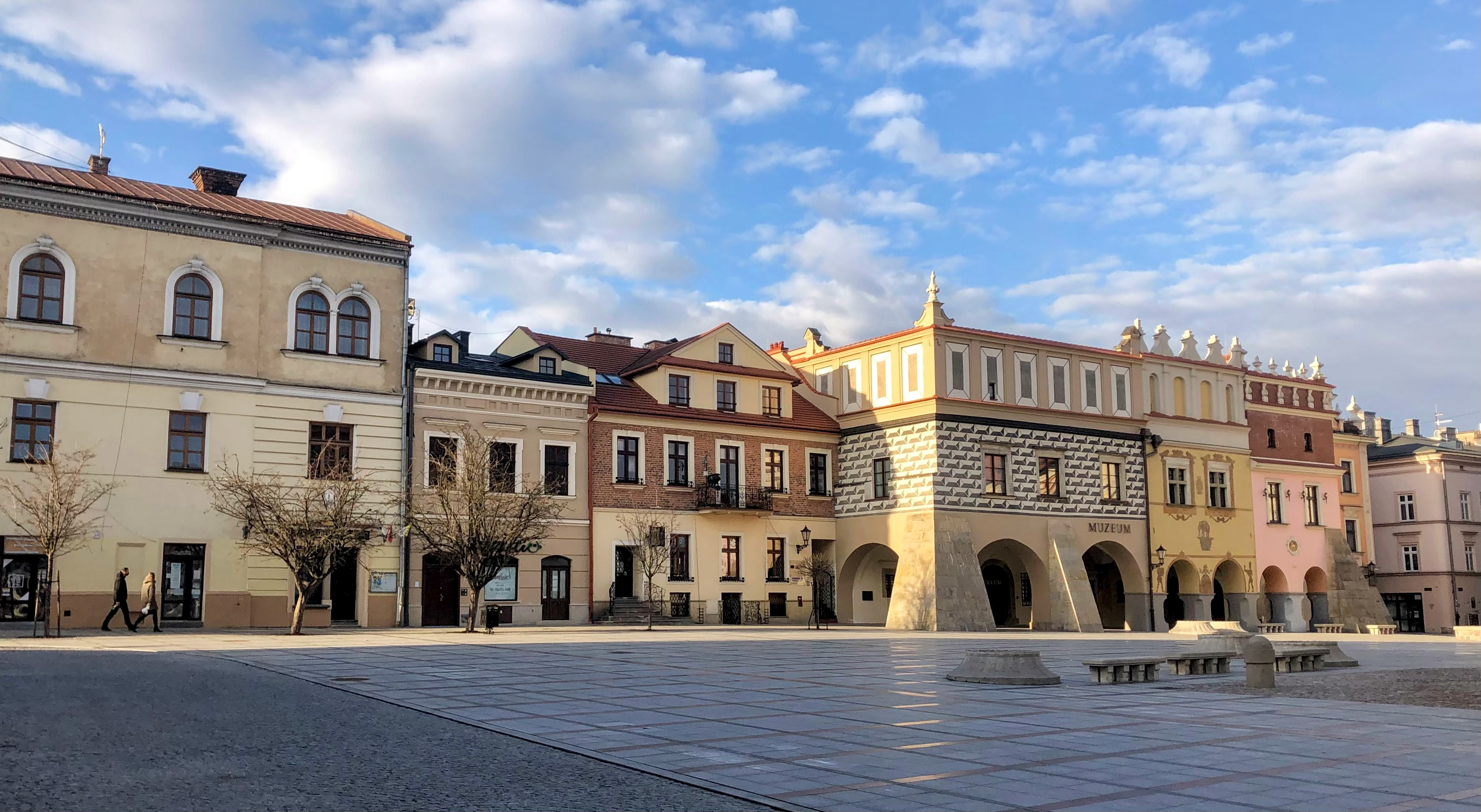
Tenements on the northern side of the Market Square

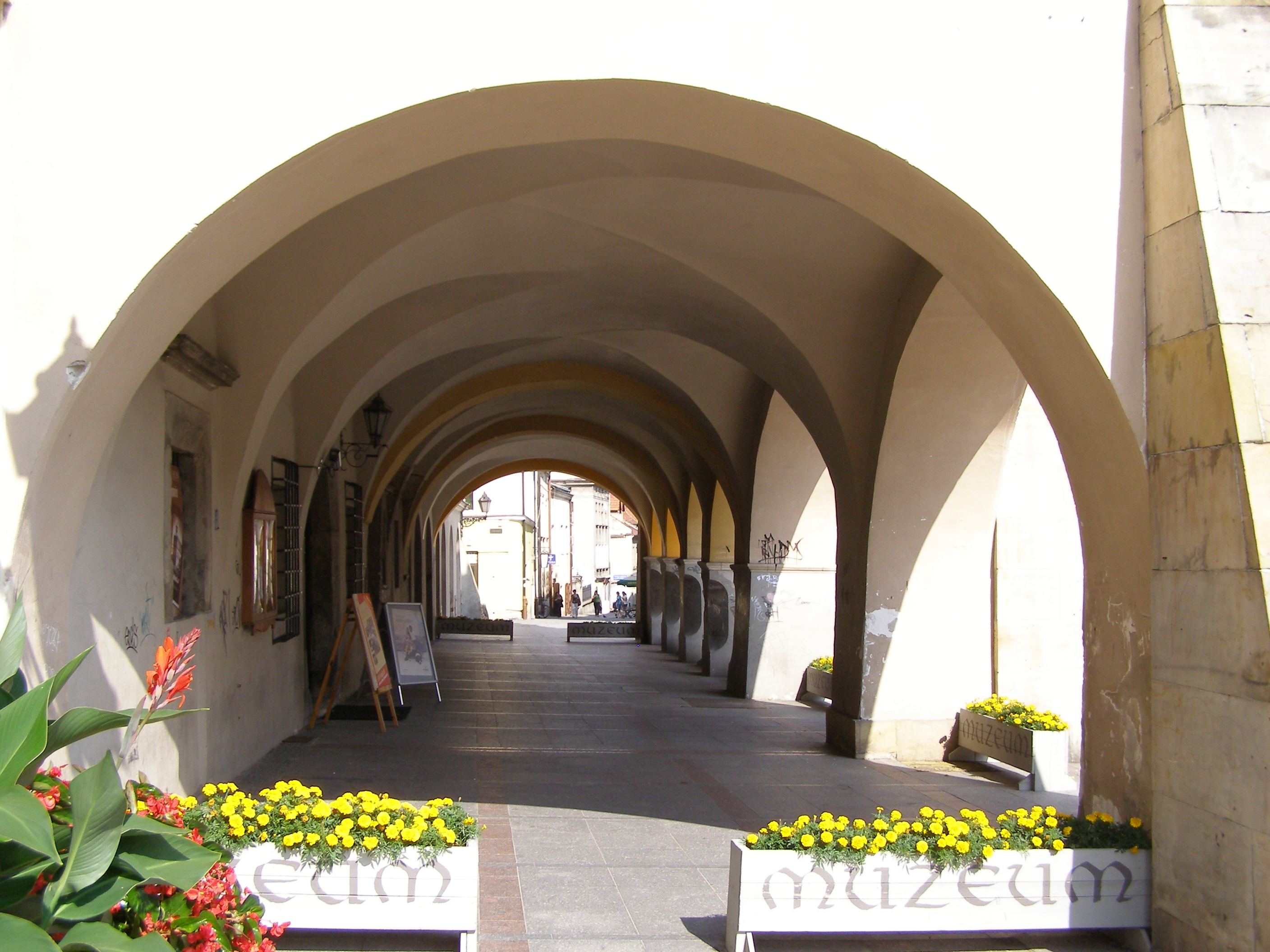
Arcades of Renaissance tenements at 21, 20, and 19 Rynek Street

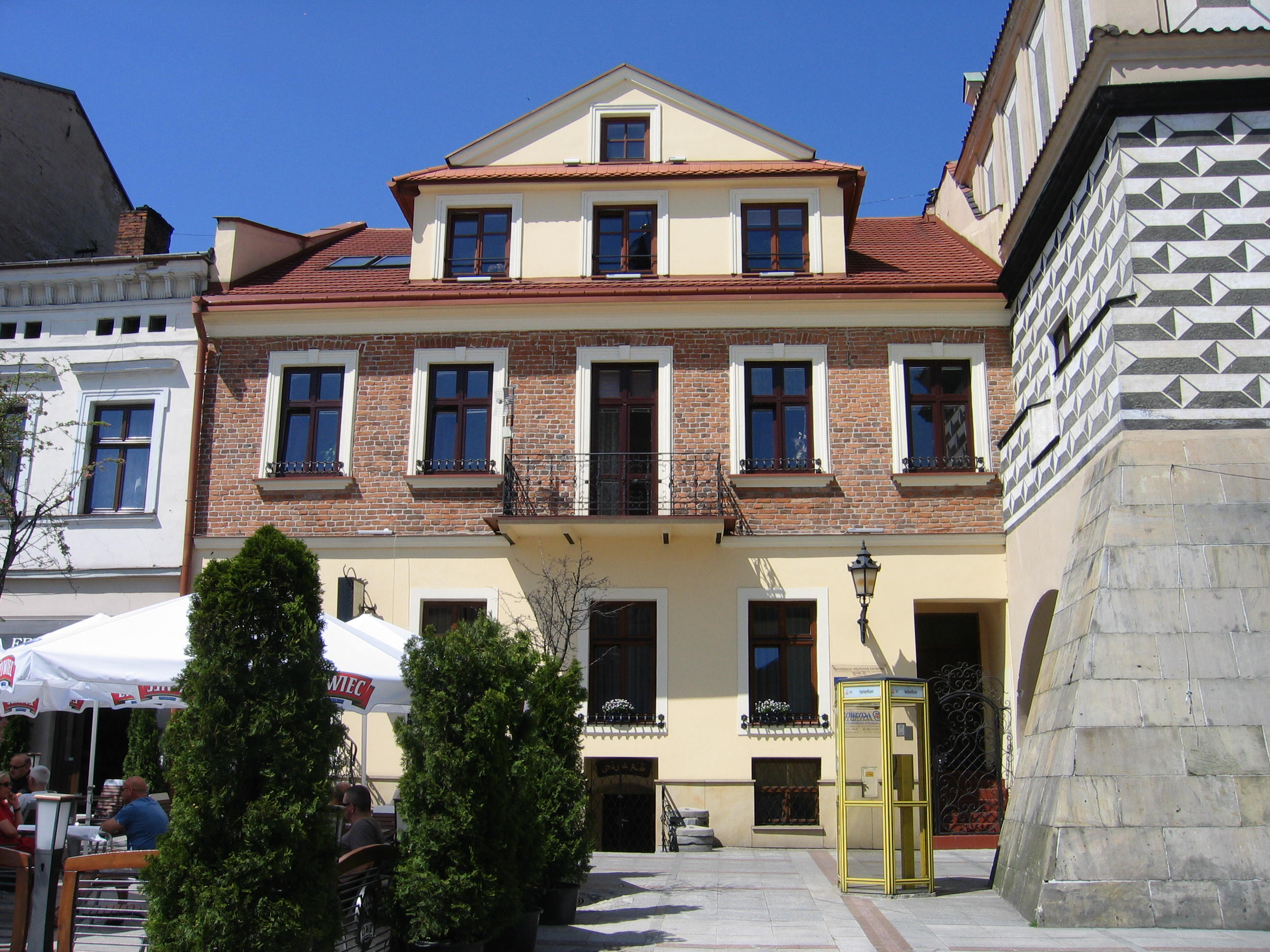
Tenement at 22 Rynek Street

The northern row consists of seven tenements between Cathedral Square to the west and Piekarska Street to the east, including Renaissance tenements with arcades extending beyond the building line. They are numbered 18 to 24 from east to west:

- Szynklerowska tenement (18 Rynek Street): A corner tenement facing Piekarska Street, rebuilt before 1796 after a 1735 fire destroyed an earlier arcaded structure. Extended to Kapitulna Street, it gained a second floor in the 19th century, with its eastern facade reinforced with buttresses. It retains 16th–19th-century basements. Its interior was merged with 19 Rynek Street during a recent renovation.
- Tenement at 19 Rynek Street: A two-part tenement with an arcade in its western section. Formed by merging two 16th-century tenements in 1913, it was rebuilt in the 18th century. The western section retains a Renaissance facade with a reconstructed attic from 1946 to 1947. The eastern arcade was removed in the 18th century. It shares an interior with 18 Rynek Street and was listed in 1947.
- Tenements at 20–21 Rynek Street: Two Renaissance single-story tenements from the 16th century, merged in 1780 to house General Richard d'Alton after the First Partition of Poland. Featuring two-bay arcades, their facades have reconstructed attics from between 1946 and 1947. The facade of 20 Rynek Street was painted by Alojzy Stanisław Majcher, a resistance member executed in 1943. 21 Rynek Street, known as the Kaszewiczowska tenement, was the main seat of the Tarnów Regional Museum from 1949 to 2013 and became the Museum of Tarnów and Region History in 2020. A plaque in 21 Rynek Street's arcade honors Jan Głuszak, a visionary Tarnów architect. They were listed in the 1930s.
- Tenement at 22 Rynek Street: A single-story tenement with a rear wing, featuring a three-axis interior and a partially unplastered brick facade. Rebuilt in the 18th century as a single-story house after a 1735 fire, it was expanded in the early 19th century. It was listed in 2005.
- Tenement at 23 Rynek: A single-story tenement on a narrow plot, rebuilt in the 18th century after a fire and expanded in the early 19th century.
- Chapter House (1 Cathedral Square/24 Rynek Street): A corner tenement facing Cathedral Square, formed by merging two older houses in the 19th century. Rebuilt in 1892 with a second floor and a Neo-Baroque facade, it housed the Pod Aniołem pharmacy, with a 19th-century angel sculpture above the entrance. It was listed in 2010.

== Bibliography ==
- Potępa, S., ed. (1994). Tarnów – Stare Miasto [Tarnów – Old Town] (in Polish). Vol. 1st. Tarnowskie Tow. Kulturalne. ISBN 83-901529-1-6.
