= Tomb of Albertas Goštautas =

16th-century Renaissance tomb in Vilnius

Tomb of Albrecht Goštautas
- Artist: Bernardino Zanobi de Gianotis
- Year: c. 1539–1541
- Type: Effigy, funerary art
- Medium: Red marble
- Subject: Albertas Goštautas
- Location: Vilnius Cathedral; Vilnius, Lithuania

The Tomb of Albrecht Goštautas is a Renaissance sculptural effigy of the Grand Chancellor of Lithuania Albertas Goštautas, located in Vilnius Cathedral. It was created by the Italian sculptor Bernardino Zanobi de Gianotis approximately between 1539 and 1541.

== Description ==
The tombstone is a slab of red marble carved with a full-length image of the deceased. The Chancellor holds a flag (standard) with one hand and presses a sword to himself with the other. The composition contains few details. The floral ornament of the background is faintly visible, the coat of arms (Abdank) is placed in a small cartouche, and the "waves" of the flag's cloth are resolved very modestly and concisely. This quality lends the image of Albrecht Goštautas a majesty and even severity appropriate to his former high office.

Albrecht Goštautas is depicted as a warrior, a knight, and a defender of the Fatherland (Grand Duchy of Lithuania). The artistic solution of this monument combines different concepts. On the one hand, it approaches Italian tombstones depicting the deceased lying on a deathbed. On the other hand, it resembles South German reliefs, where the deceased are shown clad in armor with a flag in their hands. The combination of these concepts gives the monument a stylistic contradiction: the frozen pose of the deceased and the lifelessly lowered left arm do not quite match the stance of the legs, which firmly rest against the edge of the slab, or the confident movement of the right arm holding the heavy flag.

== See also ==
- Goštautas family
- Tomb of Lew Sapieha
