= Santa Maria Mater Domini =

Church in Venice, Italy

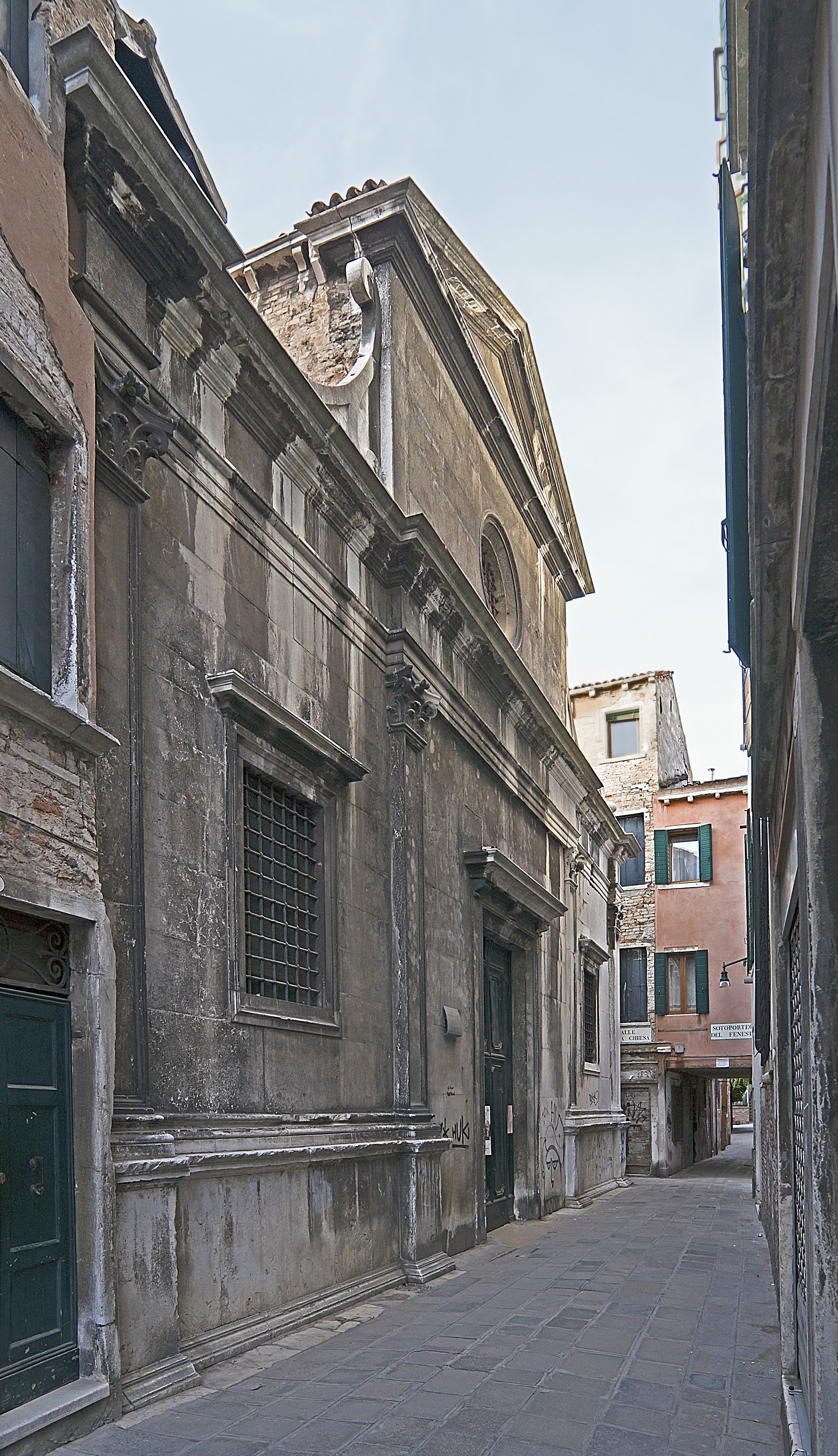

- Location within Venice Location within Italy

Religion
- Affiliation: Roman Catholic
- Province: Venice

Location
- Location: Venice, Italy
- Interactive map of Santa Maria Mater Domini
- Coordinates: 45°26′23″N 12°19′49″E

Architecture
- Style: Renaissance style

Santa Maria Mater Domini is a Renaissance style church in the sestiere of Santa Croce in Venice, Italy.

== History ==
A church at the site dates from the tenth century. The architect of the present interior is not entirely certain: Pietro Lombardo, Mauro Codussi, and Giovanni Buora are mentioned as possible authors. The facade is attributed to Jacopo Sansovino. It contains an altar by an unknown Lombard artist of the 15th century. The second altar has an altarpiece representing Vision of St Catherine the Martyr, by Vincenzo Catena, and a Transfiguration by Francesco Bissolo.

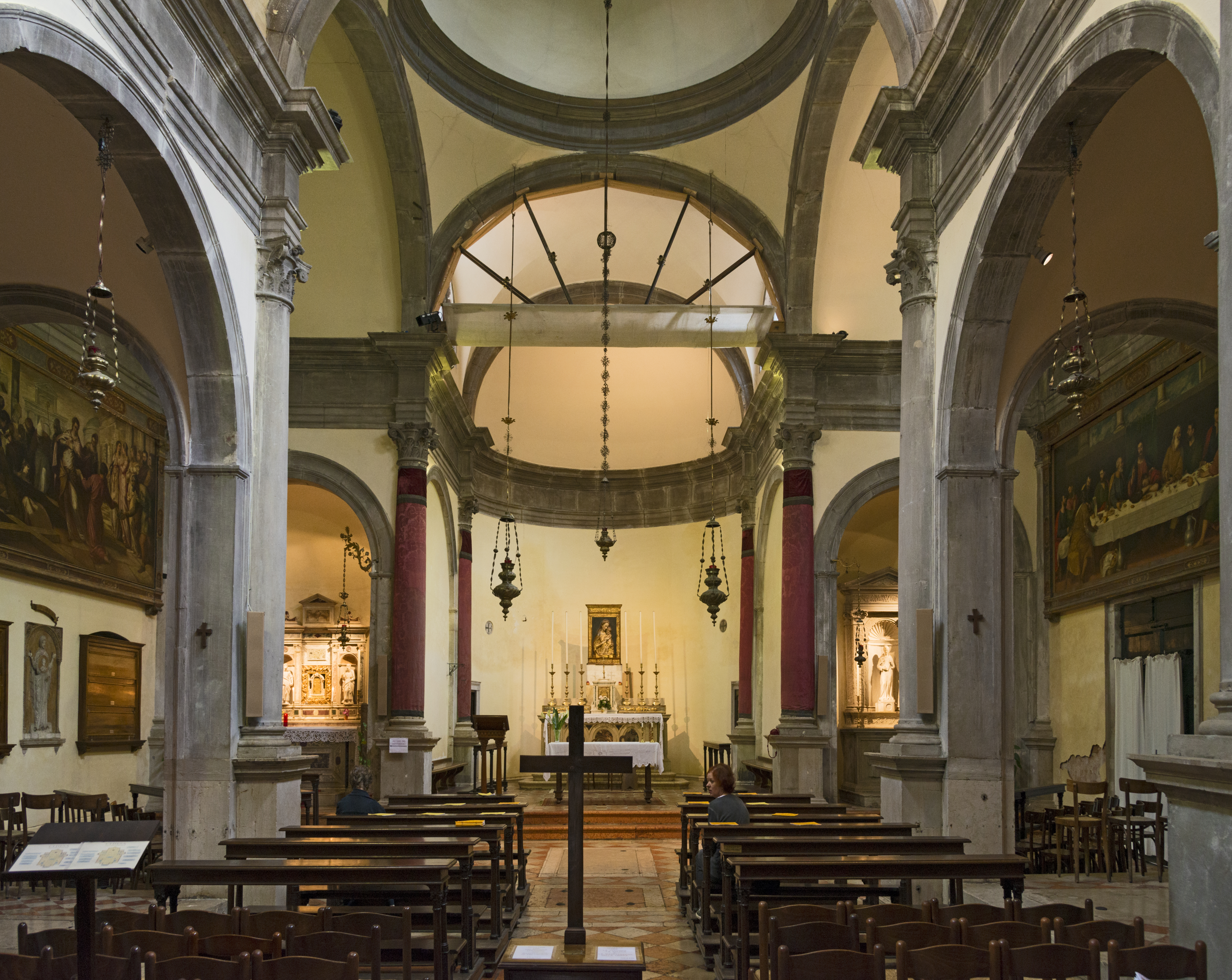
Interior

On the entrance-wall, to the left, is a Relief of the Madonna by Giovanni da Pisa, (after Donatello); on the 1st altar on the right, are sculptures by Lorenzo Bregno and Antonio Minelli; in the right transept, is a painting of Finding of the Cross, by Tintoretto; opposite, Last Supper, by Bonifazio dei Pitati; beneath, a Byzantine relief of the Madonna.

== See also ==
- 16th-century Western domes
