= Giovanni Maria Mosca =

Italian sculptor

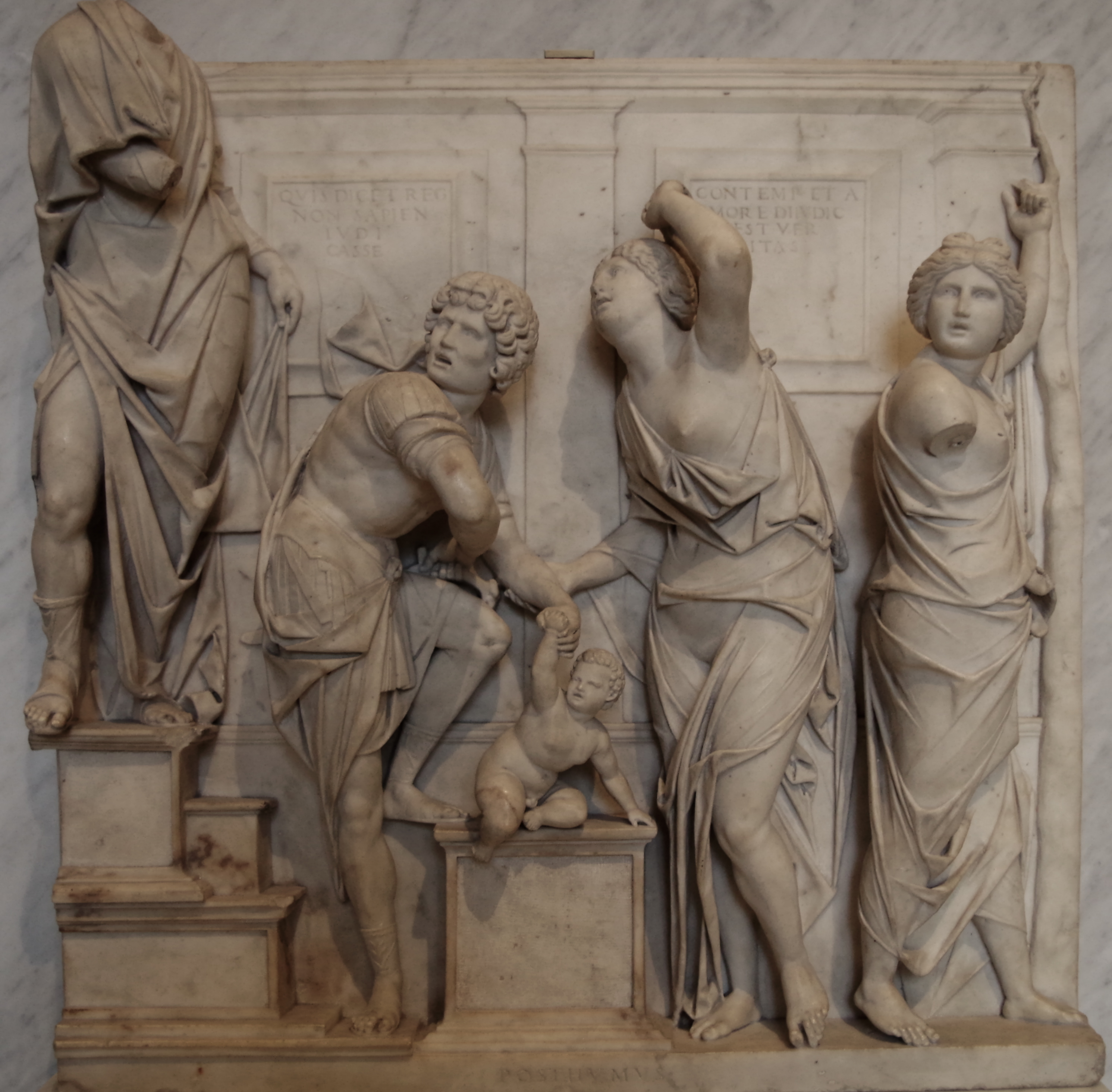
The Judgement of Solomon, Louvre, Paris

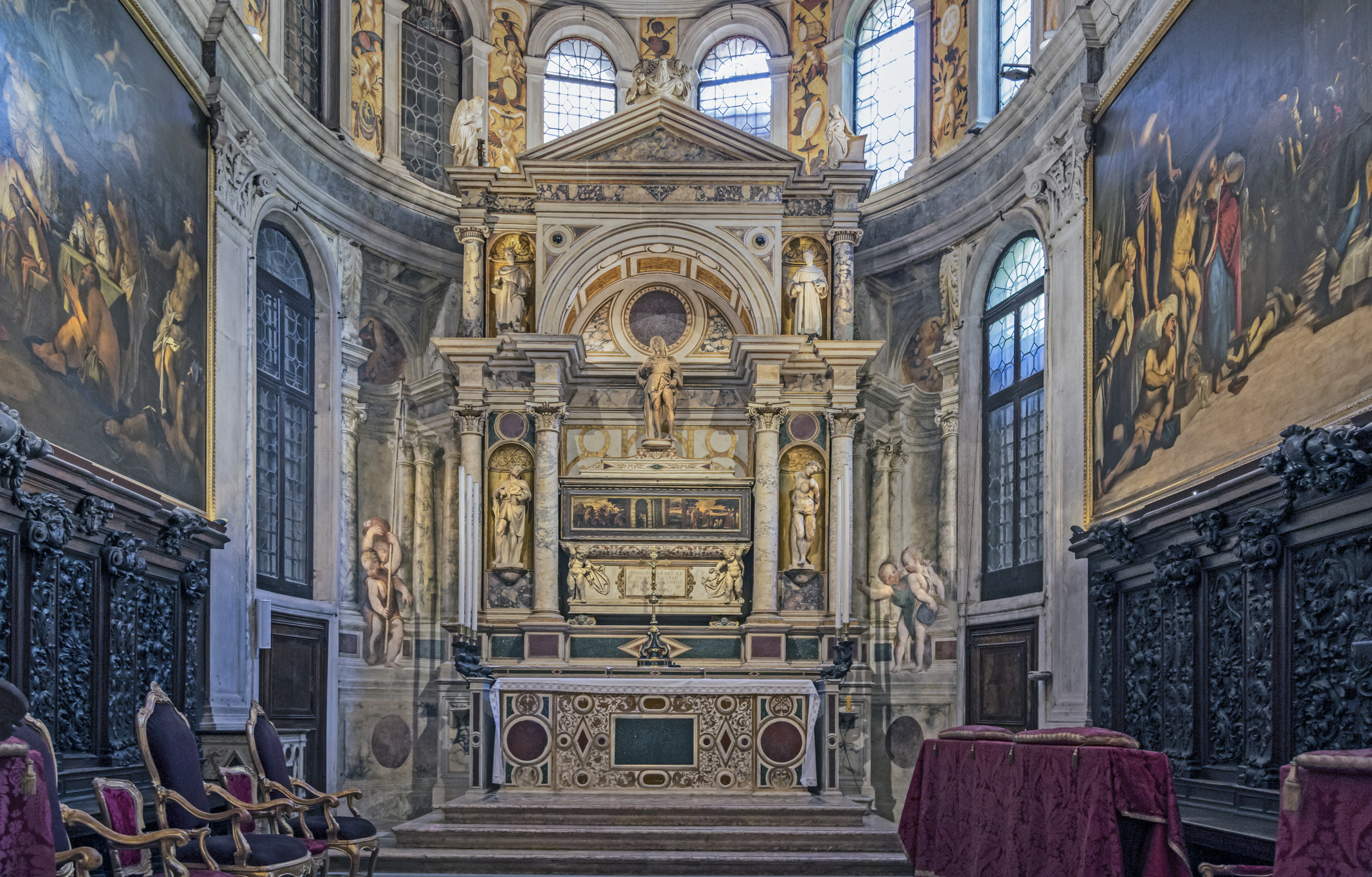
High altar, San Rocco, Venice.

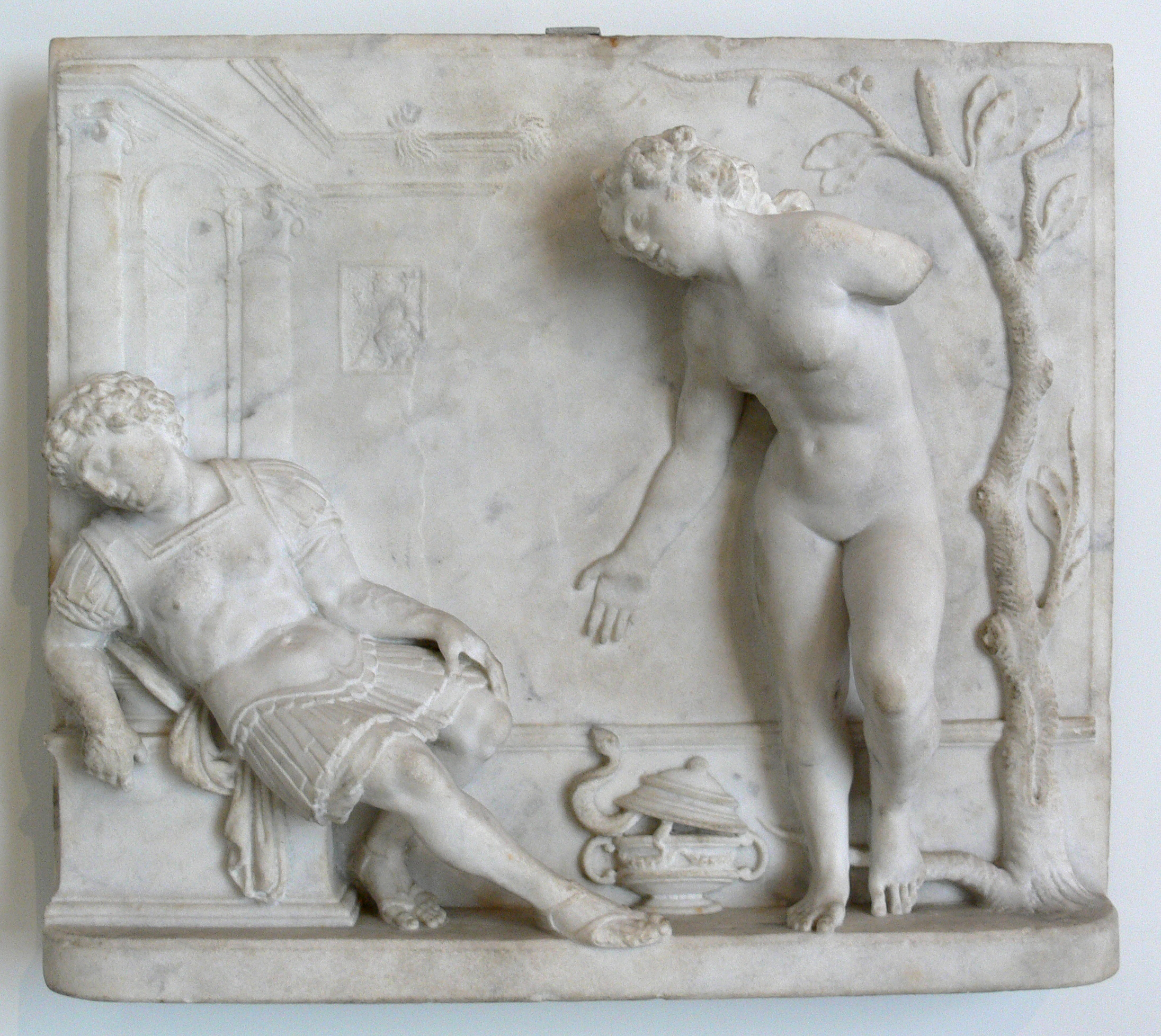
Antony and Cleopatra, Bode-Museum, Berlin

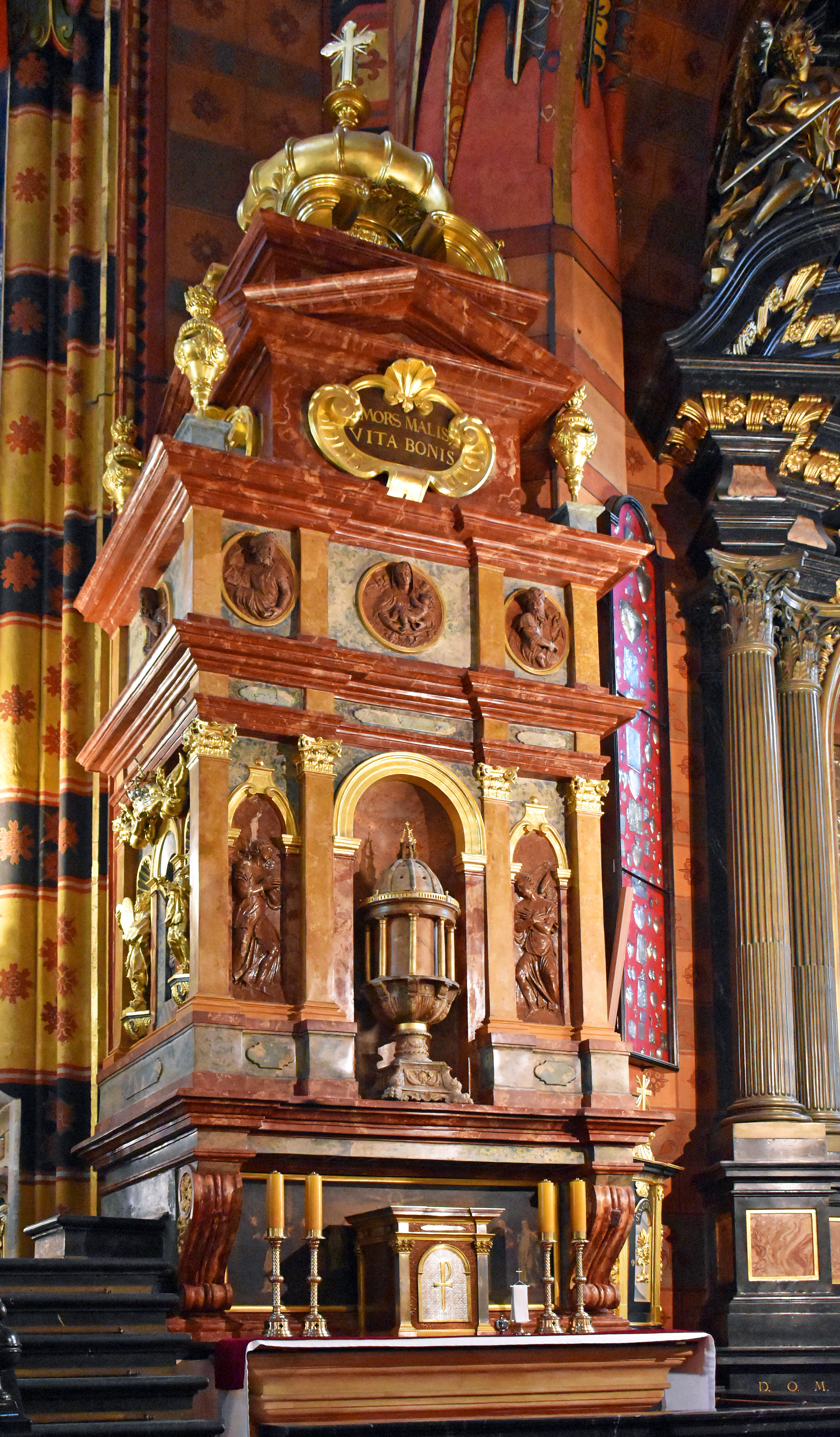
Ciborium, Church of Our Lady Assumed into Heaven, Kraków

Giovanni Maria Mosca or Giovanni Padovano (1495/99 – after 1573) was an Italian Renaissance sculptor and medallist, active between 1515 and 1573, initially in the Veneto and after 1529 in Poland, where his first name was rendered Jan.

== Life ==
Born in Padua (which now has a street named after him), the first surviving mention of Mosca dates to 1507, when he began six years as apprentice to the Paduan sculptor Giovanni Minello and then to the goldsmith Bartolomeo Mantello. His first surviving work, The Beheading of Saint John the Baptist' (1516; Padua Cathedral), dates to this period. His artistic training continued in the studio of Tullio Lombardo and Antonio Lombardo, both sons of the equally famous architect and sculptor Pietro Lombardo.

He was active in Veneto, where he produced important works in both Padua and Venice and collaborated with Guido Lizzaro, Bartolomeo di Francesco Bergamasco and Pietro Paolo Stella. He arrived in Kraków around 1529 after being summoned to Sigismund I's court. He had probably attracted by the commission for the royal tomb but probably arriving too late to contribute to that work, which was instead produced by the Florentine Bartolomeo Berrecci. His first commission in Poland was four medals showing the royal family. He gathered around himself the most important sculptural workshop in Poland, mainly specialising in tomb monuments.

== Works ==
- The Beheading of Saint John the Baptist - 1516 - sacrestia dei Prebendati, Padua Cathedral
- Saint John the Baptist - sacristy, Santo Stefano, Venice
- Saint Roch, Saint John the Baptist, Saint Francis - 1520-22 - high altar, San Rocco, Venice
- Miracle of the Glass - 1520-29 - cappella del Santo, basilica di Sant'Antonio, Padua
- The Virgin of Charity - 1522 - Isabella Stewart Gardner Museum, Boston
- Judgement of Solomon - Louvre, Paris
- Altarpiece of the Sacrament - Santa Maria Mater Domini, Venice
- Cenotaph of Alvise Pasqualigo - 1523-29 - basilica di Santa Maria Gloriosa dei Frari, Venice
- Ecce Homo Altarpiece - 1524-25 - Casa Cardinal Piazza, Venice
- Gateway - Sant'Agnese, Padua
- Porcia - 1523-29 - Galleria Franchetti alla Ca' d'Oro, Venice
- Philoctetes - 1520-29 - Palazzo Ducale, Mantua
- Eurydice - 1520-29 - Metropolitan Museum of Art, New York
- Eurydice - 1520-29 - Museo di Capodimonte, Naples
- Cleopatra - Musée des beaux-arts, Rennes
- Cleopatra - Museum Kunstpalast, Düsseldorf
- Mucius Scaevola - 1520-29 - Skulpturensammlung, Dresden
- Mucius Scaevola - 1520-29 - National Gallery of Scotland, Edinburgh
- Mucius Scaevola - 1520-29 - Museo del Bargello, Florence
- Mars/Achilles - 1520-29 - Bowes Museum, Barnard Castle
- Tomb of Archbishop Piotr Gamrat - 1545-47 - Wawel Cathedral, Kraków
- Ciborium, Wawel Cathedral, Kraków
- Arcade attic, Cloth Hall, Kraków

== Bibliography ==
- (in Italian) Matteo Ceriana (ed.), I bassorilievi mitologi e sacri, in Il camerino di alabastro. Antonio Lombardo e la scultura all'antica, catalogo della mostra tenuta a Ferrara, Cinisello Balsamo, Silvana Editoriale, 2004, pp. 250–289, ISBN 8882157202.
- (in Italian) Beatrice Cirulli, MOSCA, Giammaria, detto il Padovano, in Dizionario biografico degli italiani, vol. 77, Roma, Istituto dell'Enciclopedia Italiana, 2012. URL consultato il 12 ottobre 2018.
