= List of basilicas in Italy =

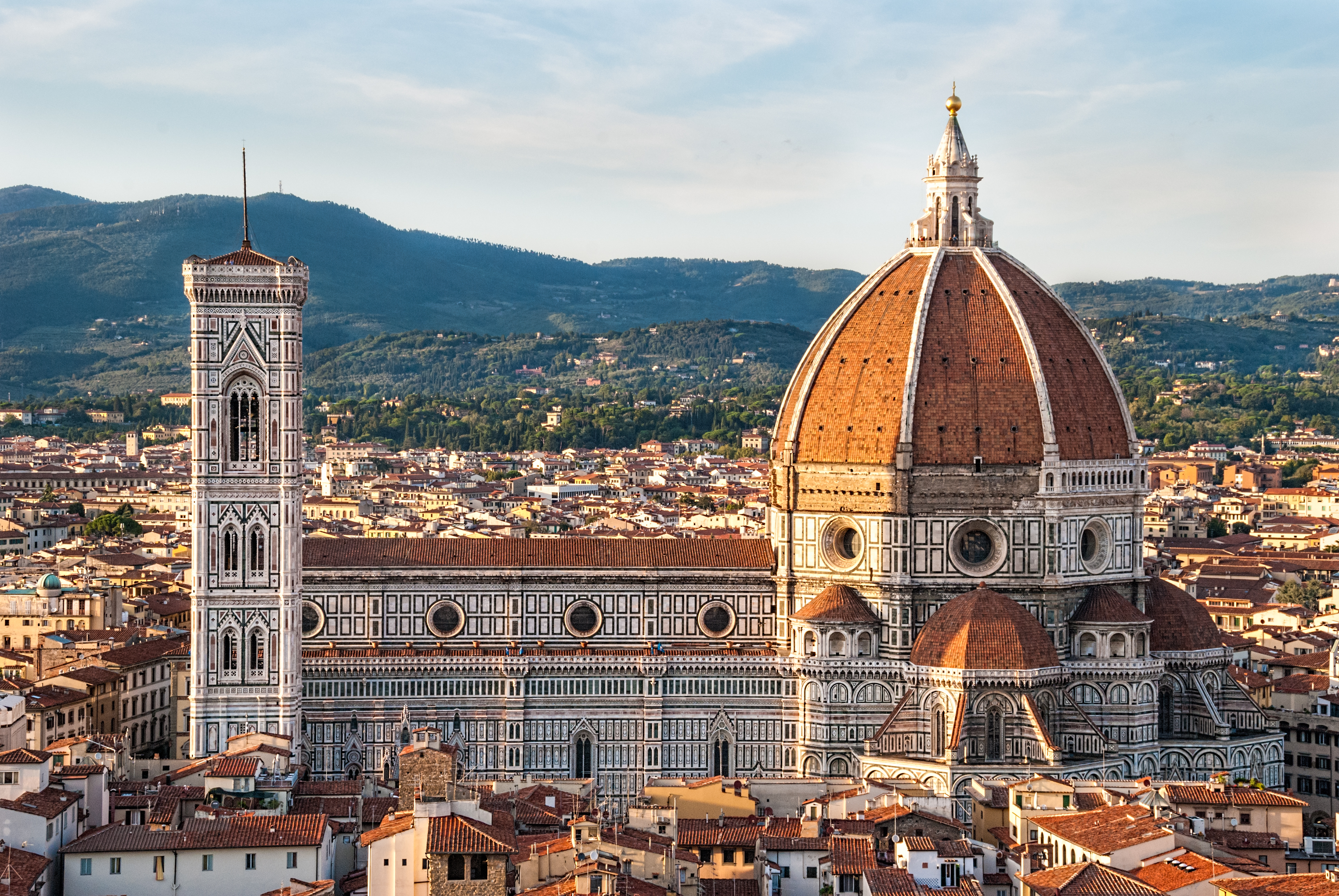
The Santa Maria del Fiore cathedral in Florence by Filippo Brunelleschi, which has the largest brick dome in the world, and is considered a masterpiece of world architecture.

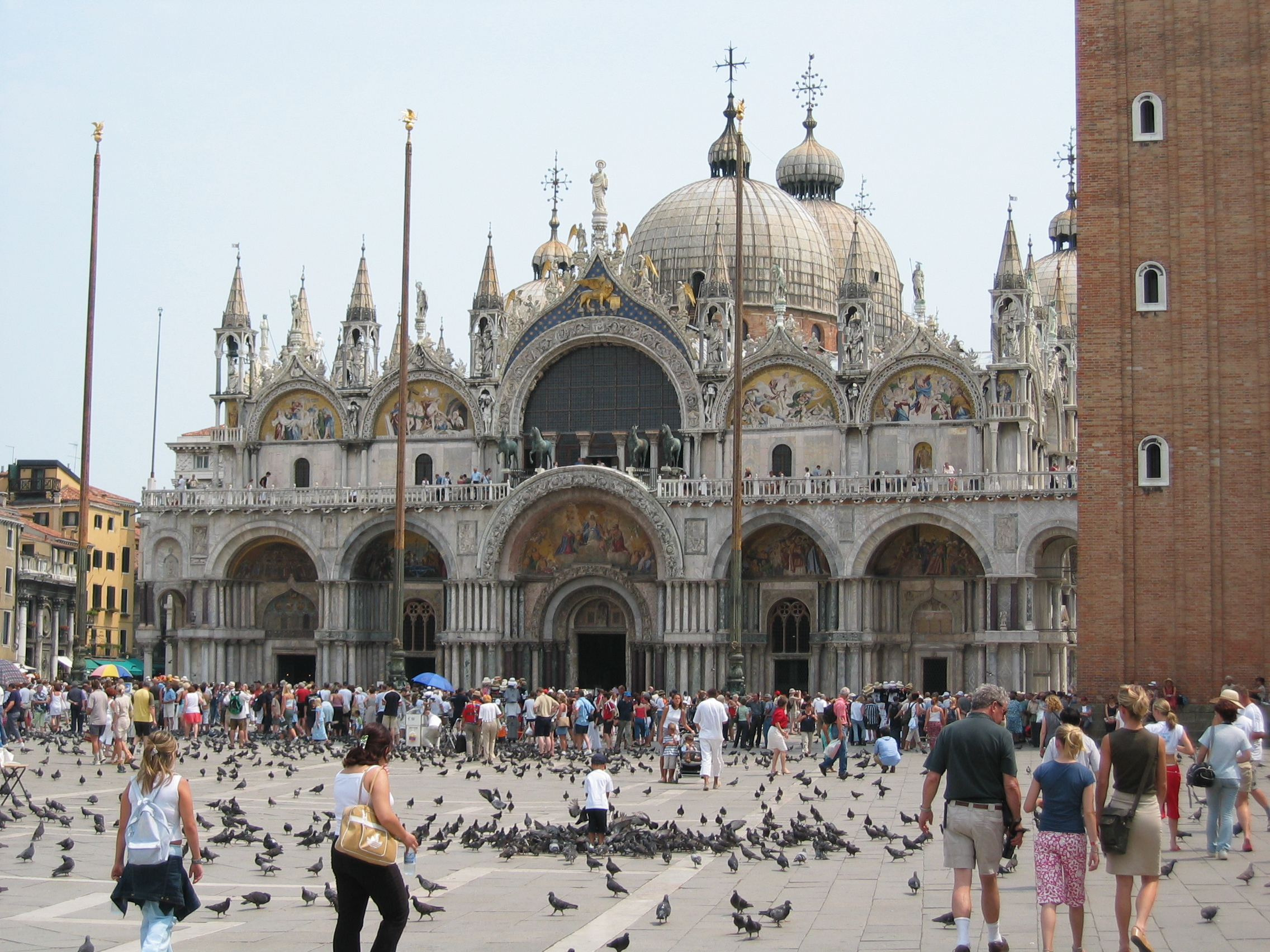
St Mark's Basilica in Venice, one of the best known examples of Italo-Byzantine architecture

The following is a list of Roman Catholic basilicas in Italy, listed by diocese and comune. The date of designation as a basilica is in parentheses.

== Acerenza ==
=== Acerenza ===
- Cathedral of Santa Maria Assunta (1956)

=== Tolve ===
- Santuario di San Rocco (2023)

== Acerra ==
=== Santa Maria a Vico ===
- Santa Maria Assunta (1957)

== Acireale ==
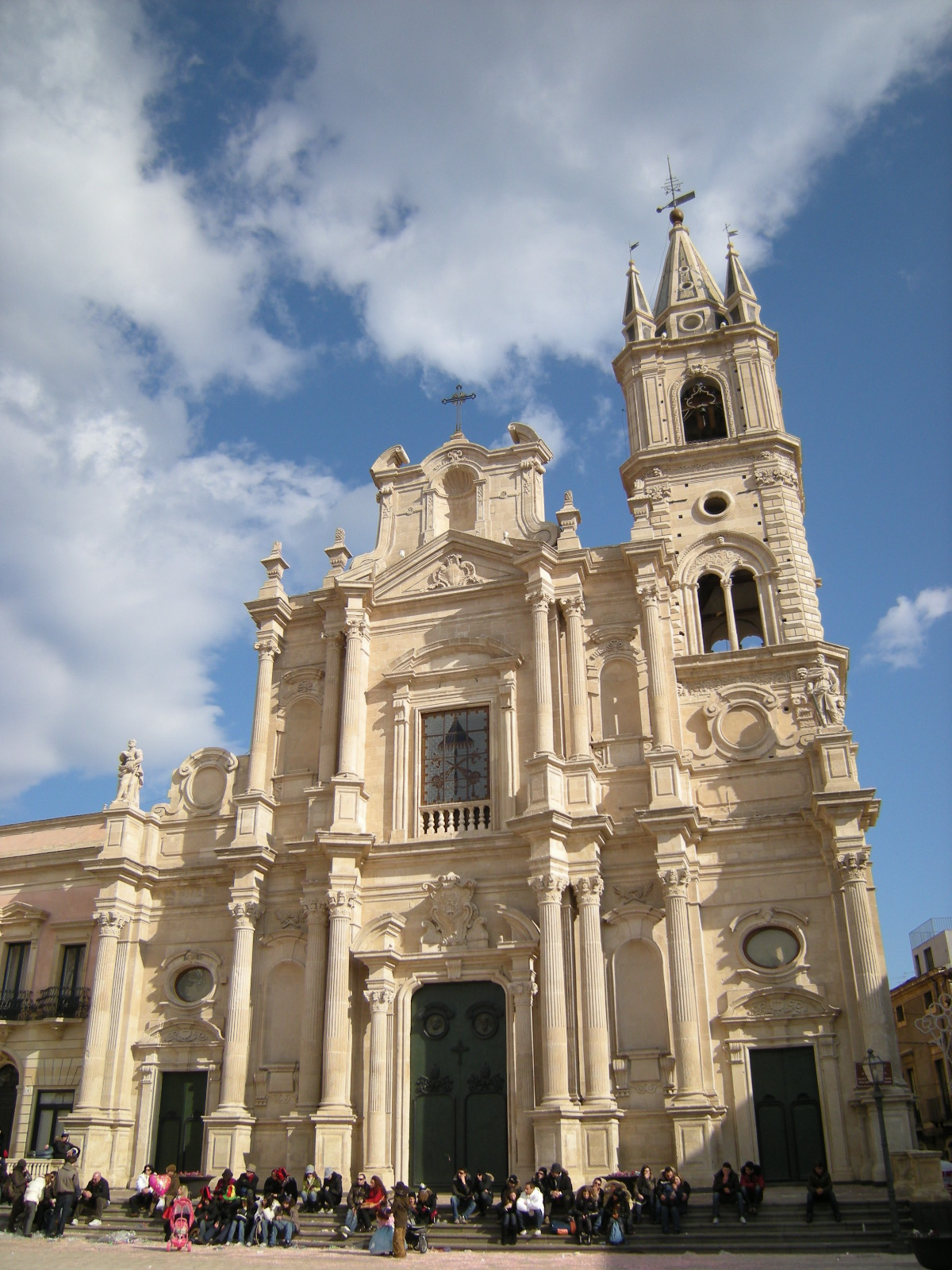
Santi Pietro e Paolo, Acireale

=== Acireale ===
- Cathedral of Santa Maria Annunziata (1948)
- Santi Pietro e Paolo (1933)
- San Sebastiano (1990)

=== Castiglione di Sicilia ===
- Maria Santissima della Catena (1985)

=== Randazzo ===
- Santa Maria Assunta (1957)

=== Riposto ===
- San Pietro (1967)

== Acqui ==
=== Acqui ===
- San Pietro (ancient)

== Adria – Rovigo ==
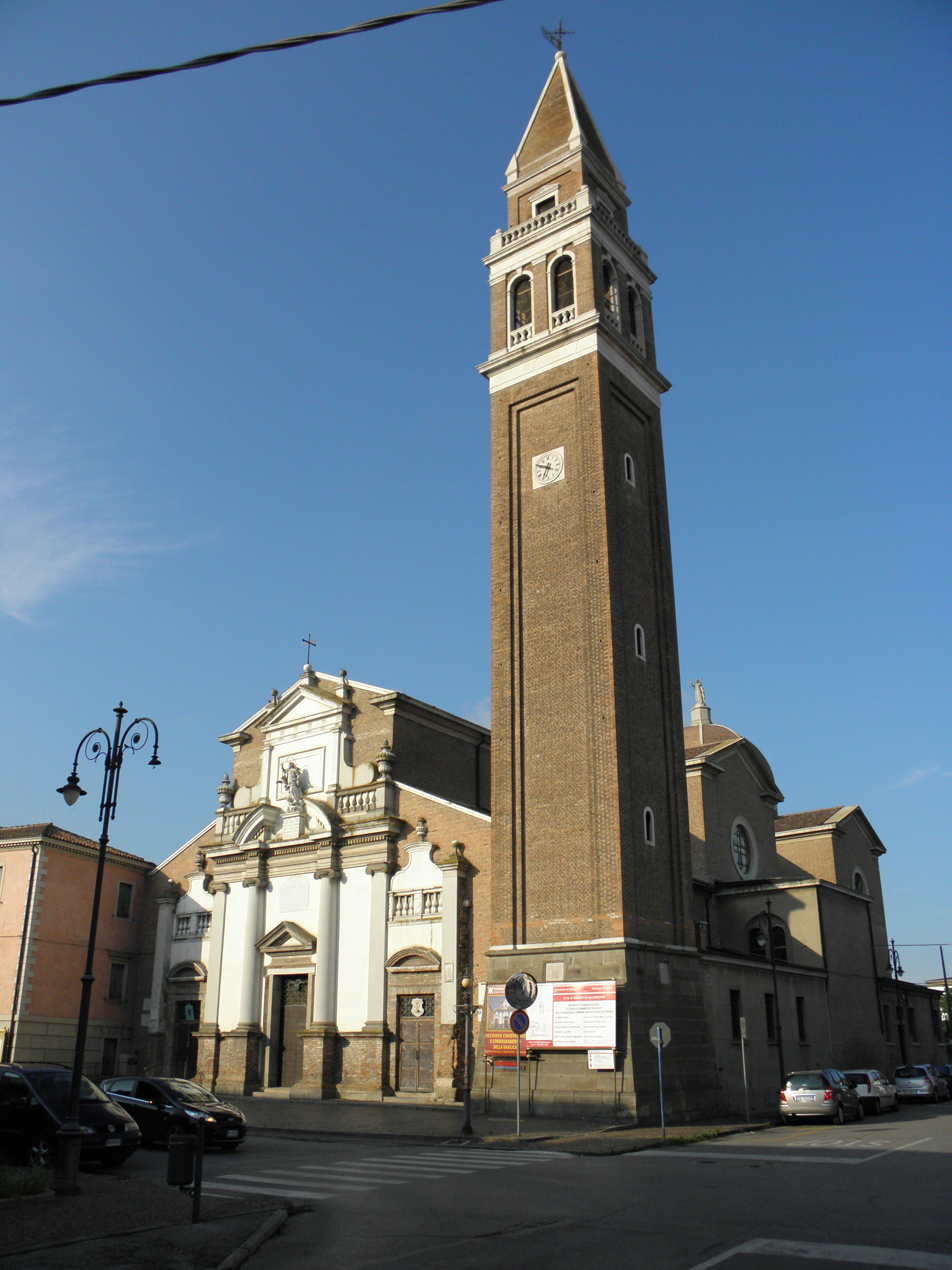
Santa Maria della Tomba, Adria

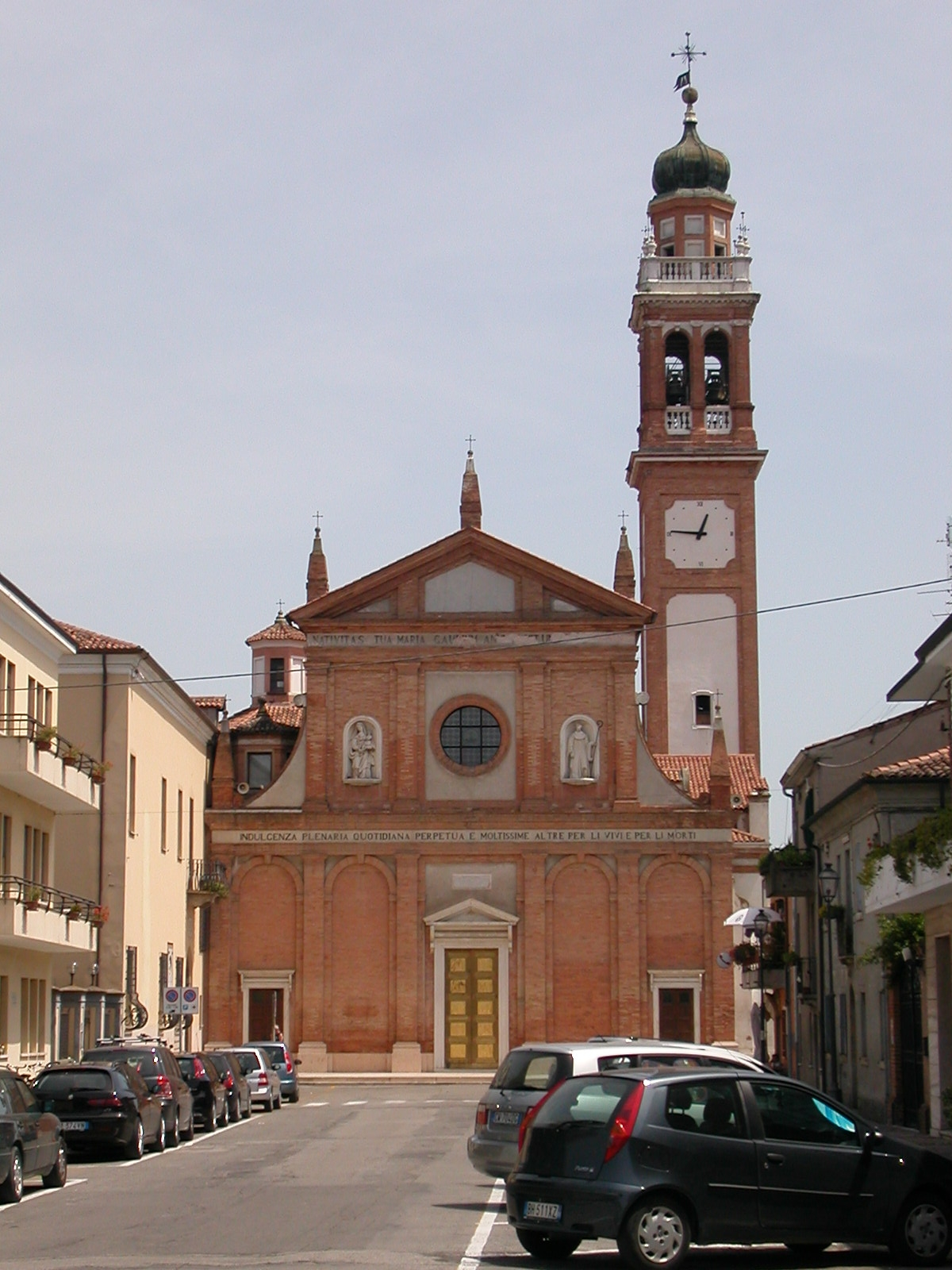
Santa Maria del Pilastrello, Lendinara

=== Adria ===
- Santa Maria della Tomba (ancient)

=== Lendinara ===
- Santa Maria del Pilastrello (1911)

=== San Bellino ===
- San Bellino (ancient)

=== Sant'Apollinare ===
- Sant'Apollinare (ancient)

== Agrigento ==
=== Agrigento ===
- Cathedral of Santa Maria Assunta (1951)
- Santi Maria Immaculata e Francesco d'Assisi (1940)

=== Sciacca ===
- Santa Maria (1991)
- San Calogero (1979)

== Albano ==
=== Albano Laziale ===
- Cathedral of Santi Giovanni Battista e Pancrazio (1865)

=== Anzio ===
- Santa Teresa (1959)

=== Marino ===
- San Barnaba Apostolo (1851)

=== Nettuno ===
- Nostra Signora delle Grazie e Santa Maria Goretti (1970)

== Albenga – Imperia ==
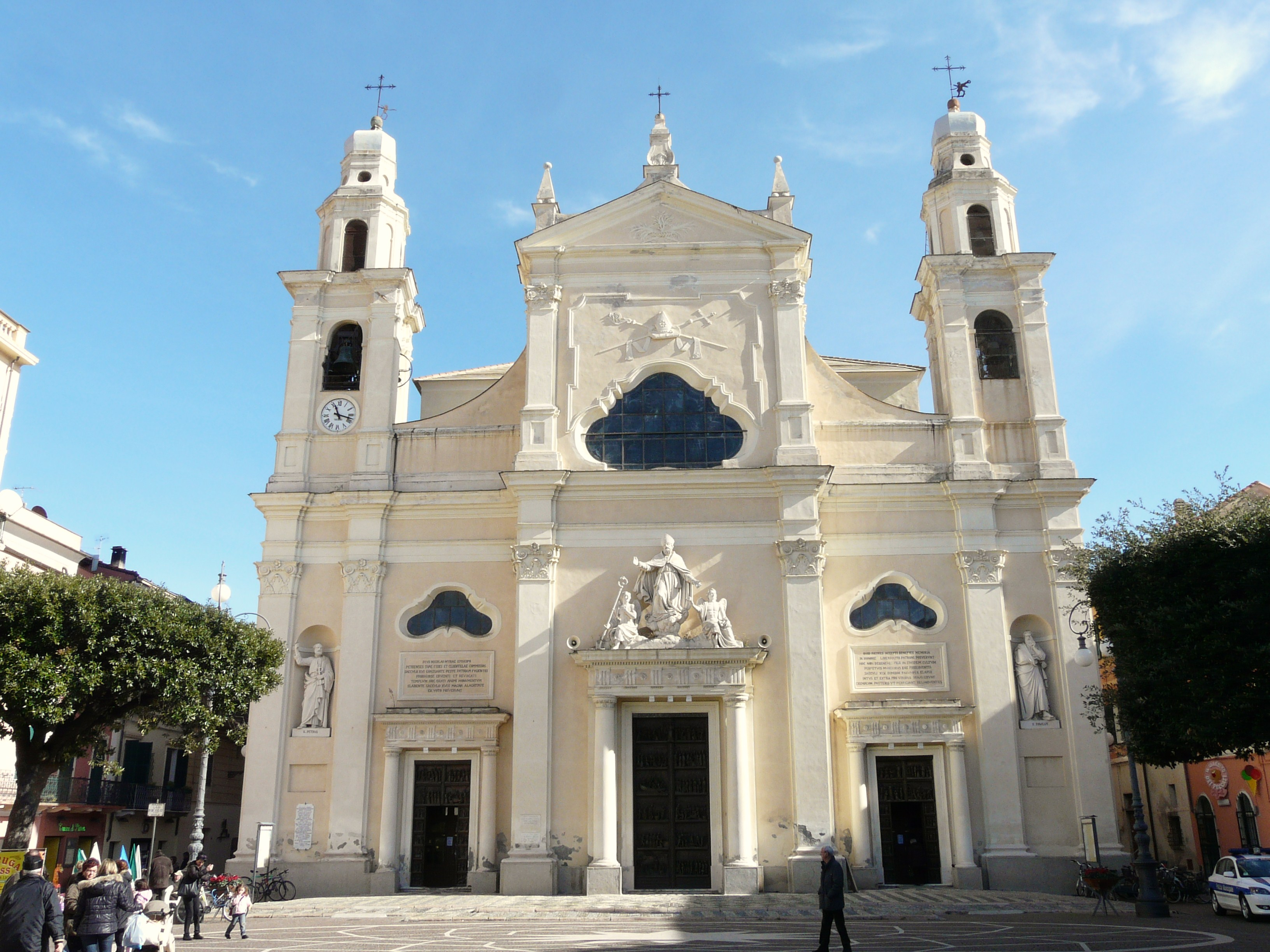
San Nicolò, Pietra Ligure

=== Imperia ===
- San Maurizio (1947)

=== Pietra Ligure ===
- San Nicolò di Bari (1992)

== Alessandria ==
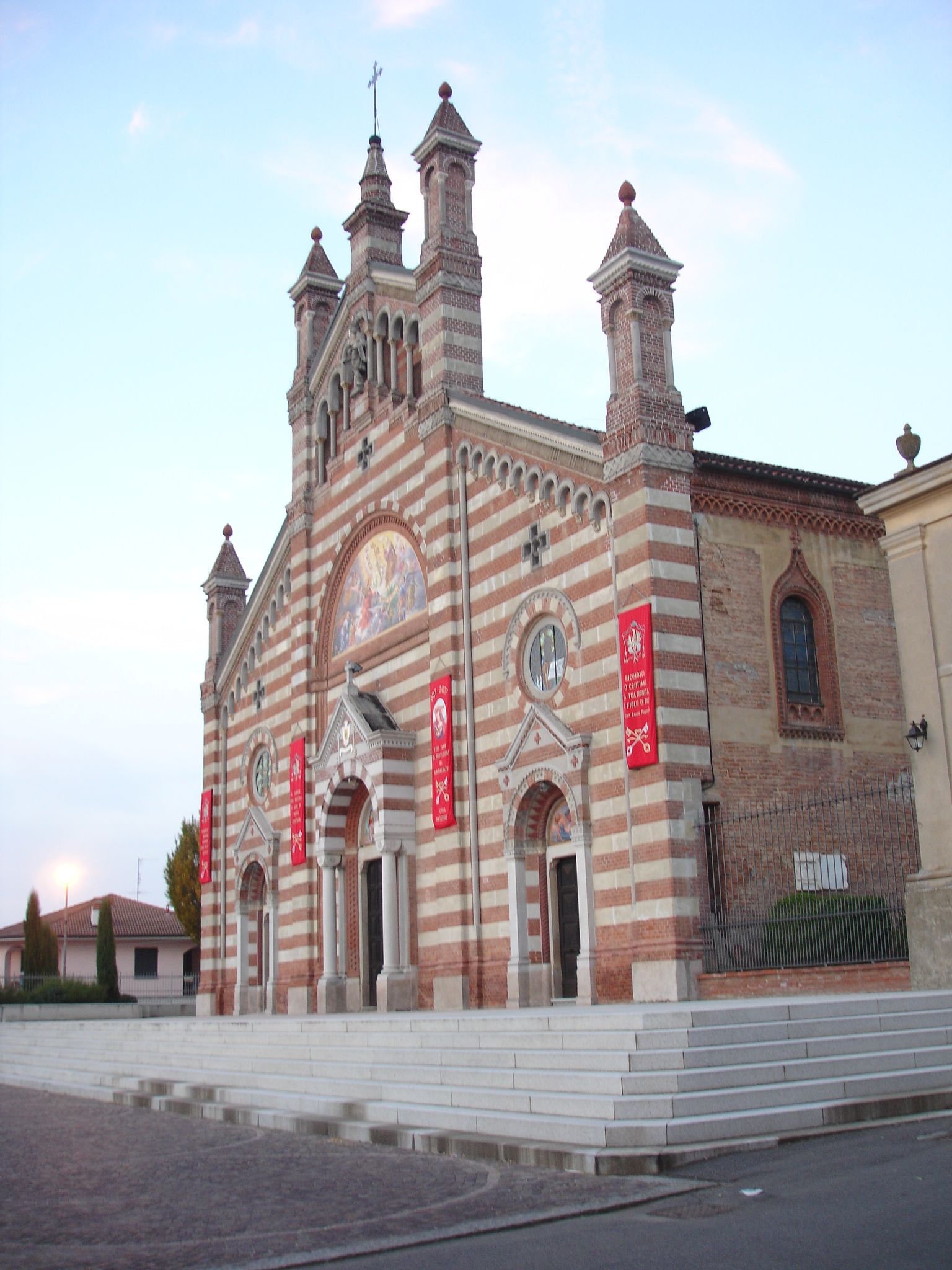
San Dalmatio basilica, Quargnento

=== Quargnento ===
- San Dalmatio (1992)

== Alghero – Bosa ==
=== Cuglieri ===
- Santa Maria della Neve (1919)

== Alife – Caiazzo ==
=== Caiazzo ===
- Concattedrale di Maria Santissima Assunta e Santo Stefano Vescovo (2013)

=== Piedimonte Matese ===
- Santa Maria Maggiore (1945)

== Altamura – Gravina – Acquaviva delle Fonti ==
=== Gravina in Puglia ===
- Co-Cathedral of Maria Santissima Assunta (1993)

== Amalfi – Cava de' Tirreni ==
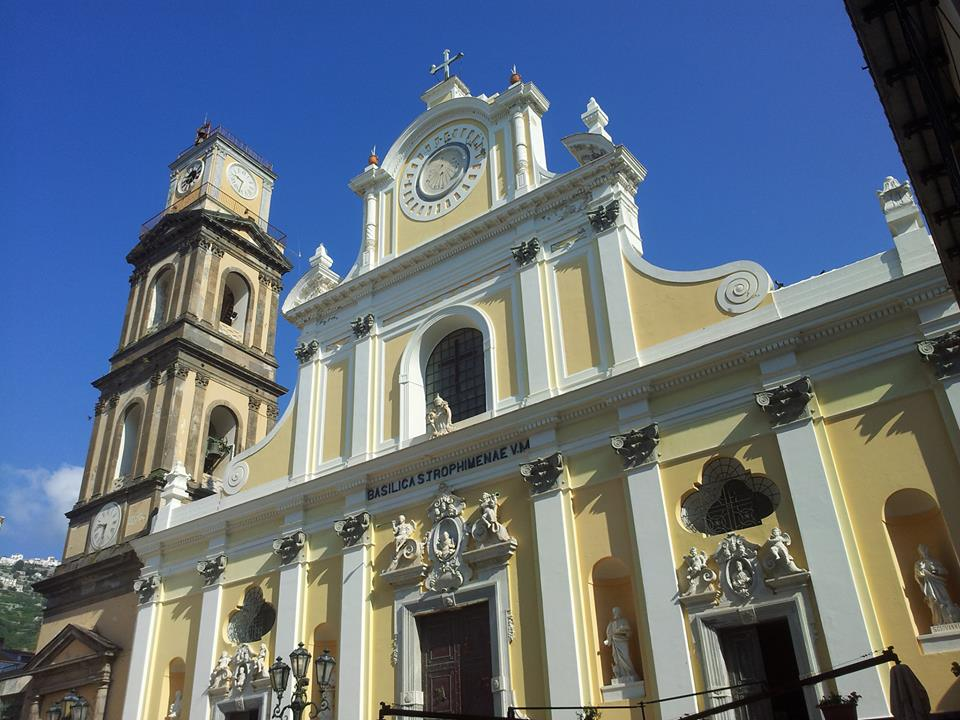
Santa Trofimena, Minori

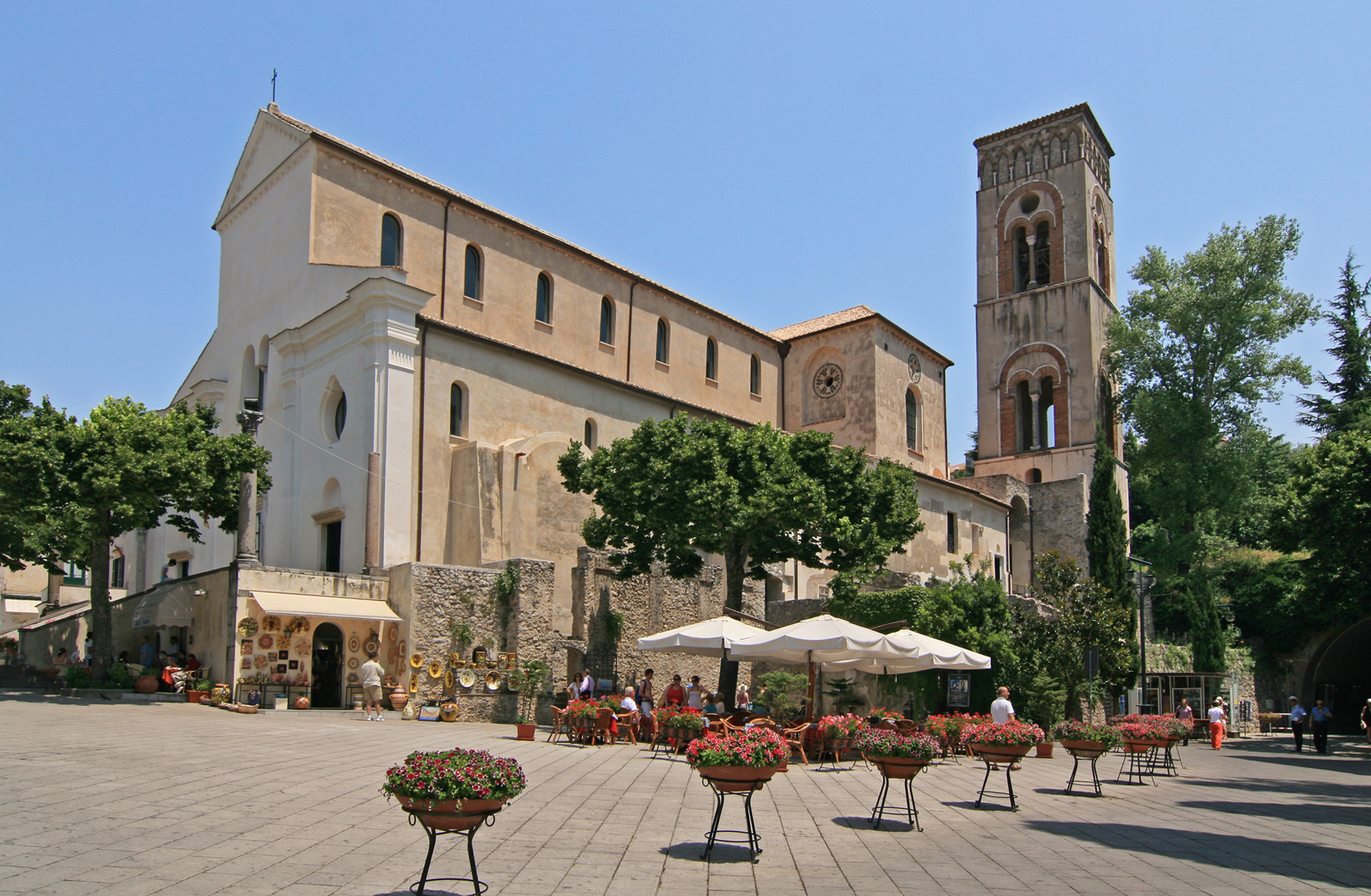
Santa Maria Assunta, Ravello

=== Cava de' Tirreni ===
- Santa Maria dell'Olmo (1931)

=== Minori ===
- Santa Trofimena (1910)

=== Ravello ===
- Santa Maria Assunta (1918)

== Anagni – Alatri ==
=== Alatri ===
- Co-Cathedral of San Paolo (1950)

=== Anagni ===
- Cathedral of Maria Santissima Annunziata (ancient)

== Ancona – Osimo ==
=== Ancona ===
- Cathedral of San Ciriaco (1926)

=== Osimo ===
- Co-Cathedral of Santa Tecla (1955)

== Arezzo – Cortona – Sansepolcro ==
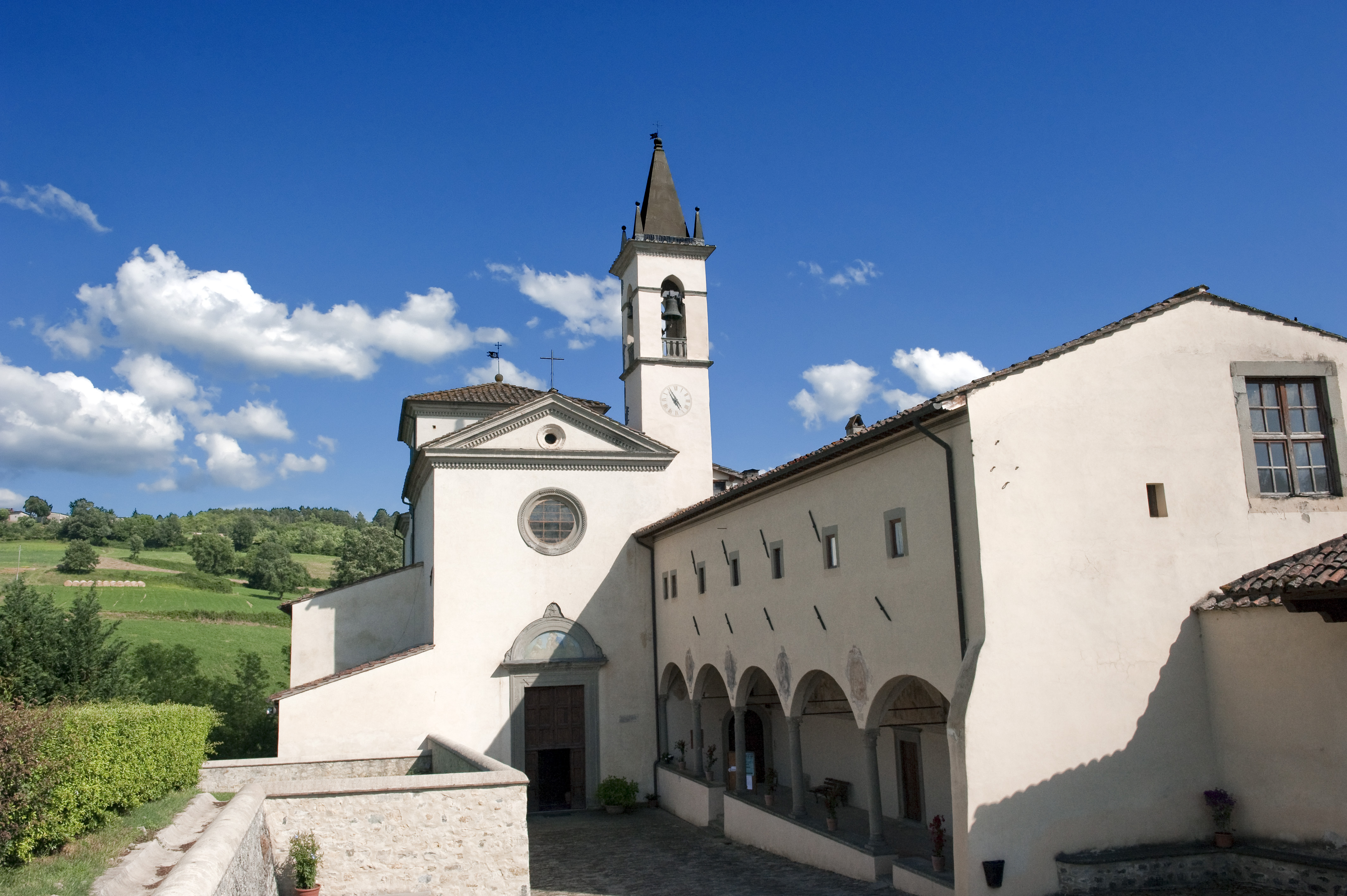
Santa Maria del Sasso, Bibbiena

=== Arezzo ===
- San Domenico (1960)
- San Francesco d'Assisi (1955)

=== Bibbiena ===
- Santa Maria del Sasso (1942)

=== Chiusi della Verna ===
- Santa Maria Assunta (1921)

=== Cortona ===
- Santa Margherita Penitente (1927)

=== Sansepolcro ===
- Co-Cathedral of San Giovanni Evangelista (1962)

== Ariano Irpino – Lacedonia ==
=== Ariano Irpino ===
- Cathedral of Santa Maria Assunta (1984)

== Ascoli Piceno ==
=== Ascoli Piceno ===
- Cathedral of Madre di Dio e San Emidio (1857)

== Assisi – Nocera Umbra – Gualdo Tadino ==
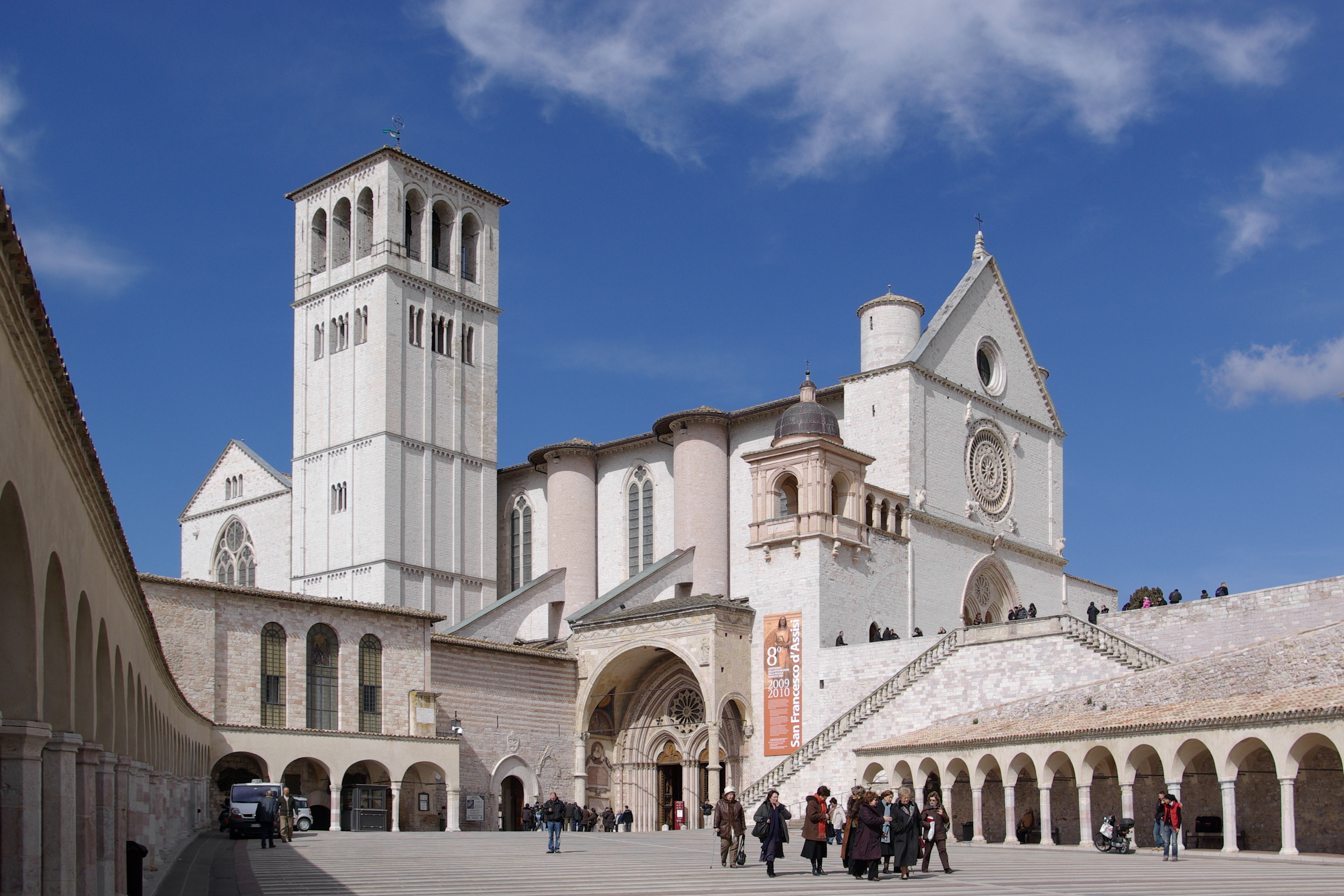
San Francesco d'Assisi, Assisi

=== Assisi ===
- Santa Chiara (1912)
- Basilica of San Francesco d'Assisi (ancient)
- Santa Maria degli Angeli (ancient)

=== Gualdo Tadino ===
- San Benedetto (1980)

== Aversa ==
San Tammoro Basilica, Grumo Nevano

=== Grumo Nevano ===
- San Tammaro (1982)

== Avezzano ==
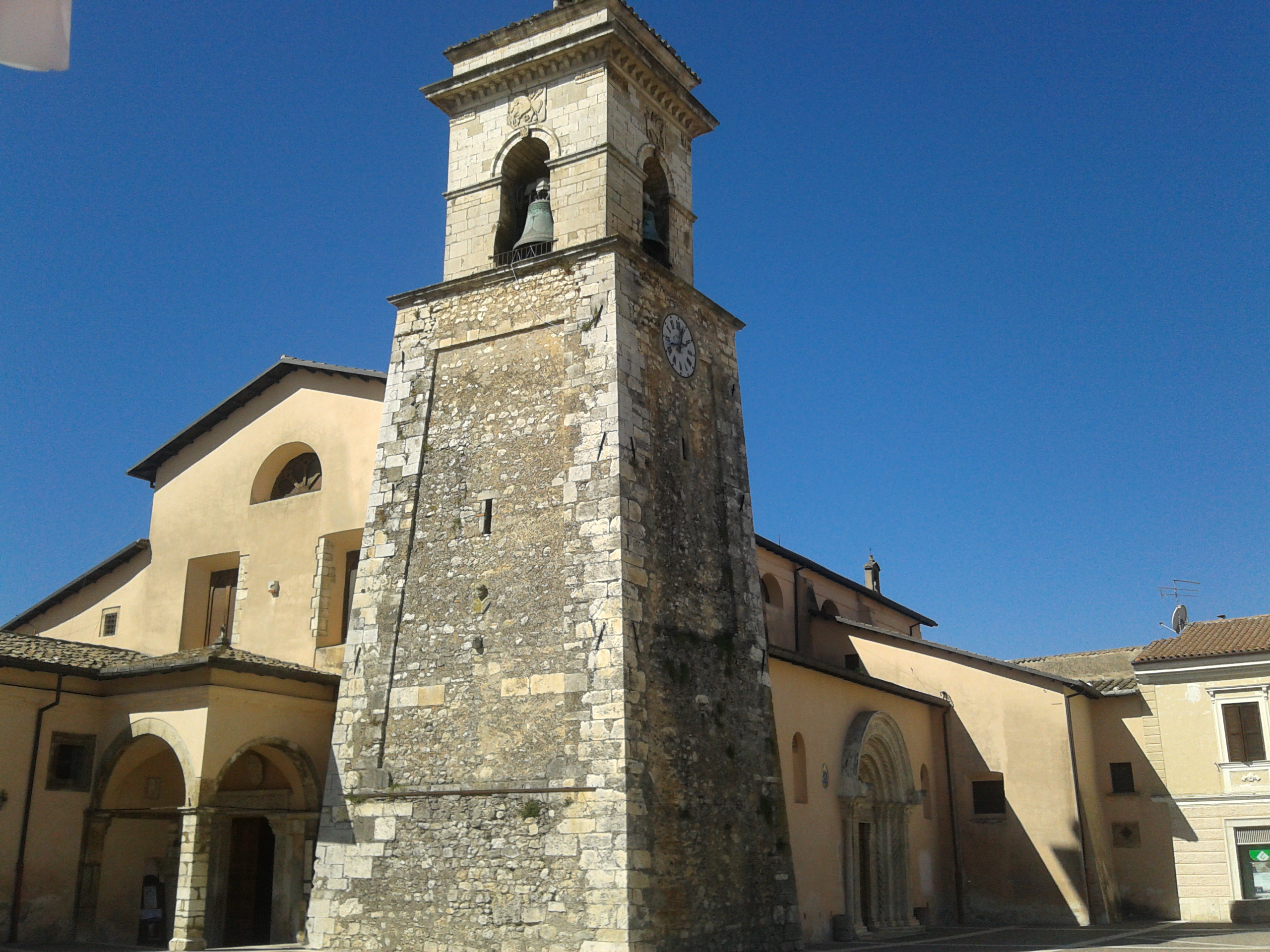
San Cesidio e Rufino, Trasacco

=== Pescina ===
- Basilica Concattedrale di S. Maria delle Grazie (2016)

=== Trasacco ===
- San Cesidio e Rufino (ancient)

== Bari – Bitonto ==
=== Bari ===
- Cathedral of Santa Maria Assunta (1954)
- San Nicola (ancient)
- Santa Fara (2014)

=== Bitonto ===
- Santi Medici Cosma e Damiano (1975)

== Belluno – Feltre ==
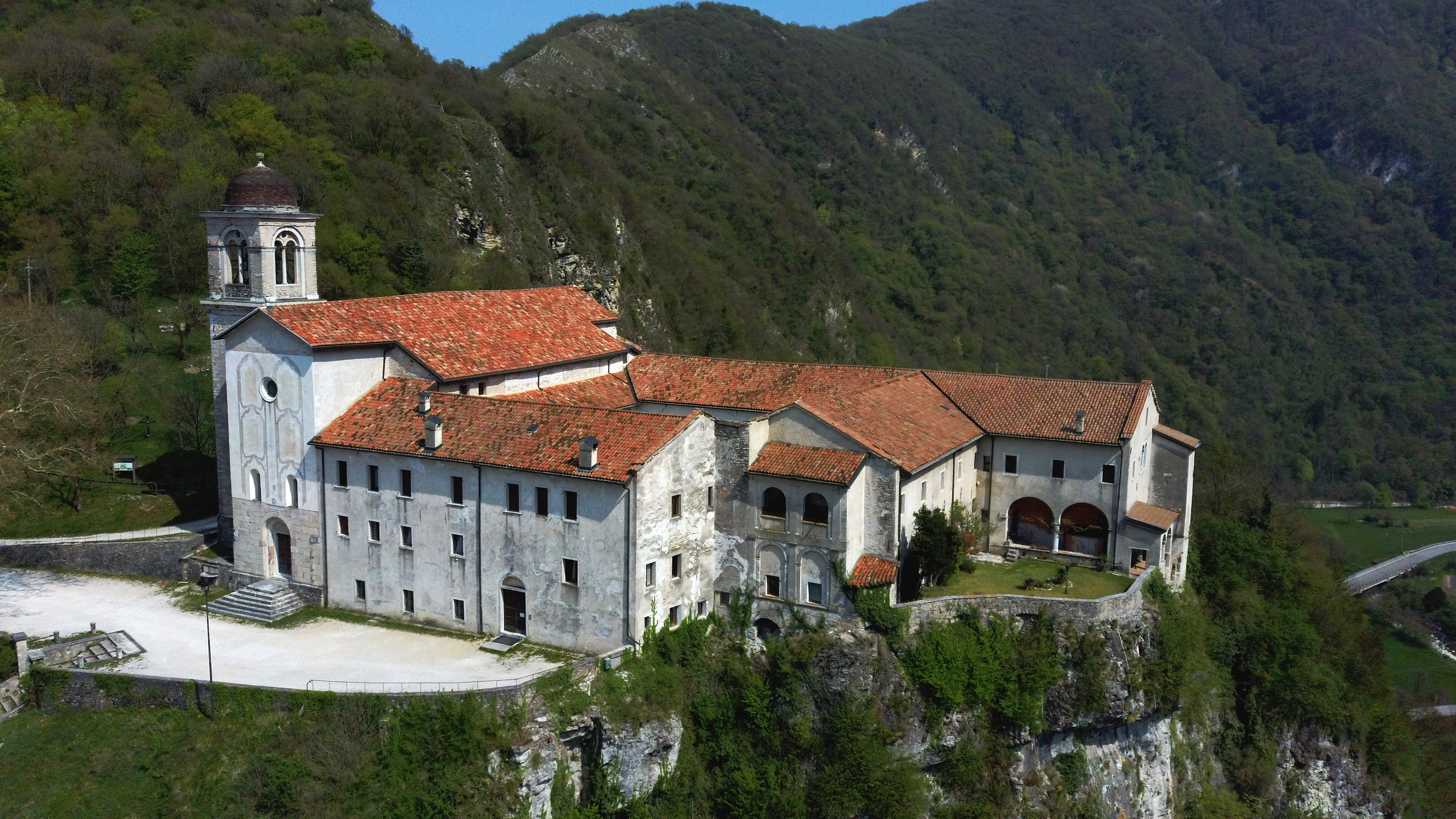
Santi Vittore e Corona, Feltre

=== Belluno ===
- Cathedral of San Martino (1980)

=== Cortina d'Ampezzo ===
- Santi Filippo e Giacomo (2011)

=== Feltre ===
- Santi Vittore e Corona (2002)

== Benevento ==
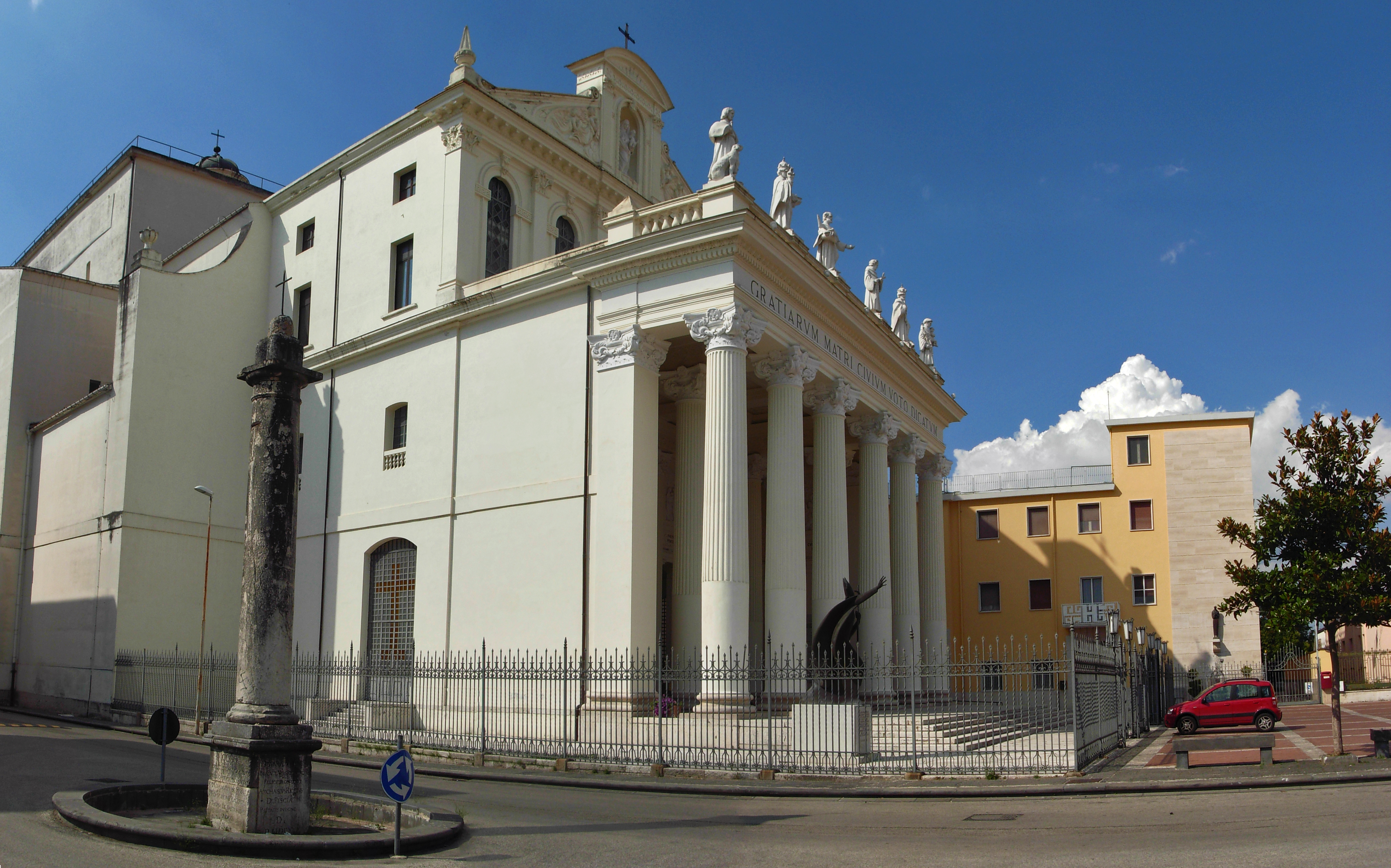
Santa Maria delle Grazie, Benevento

=== Benevento ===
- Santa Maria delle Grazie (1957)

=== Vitulano ===
- Santa Maria Annunziata (1991)

== Bergamo ==
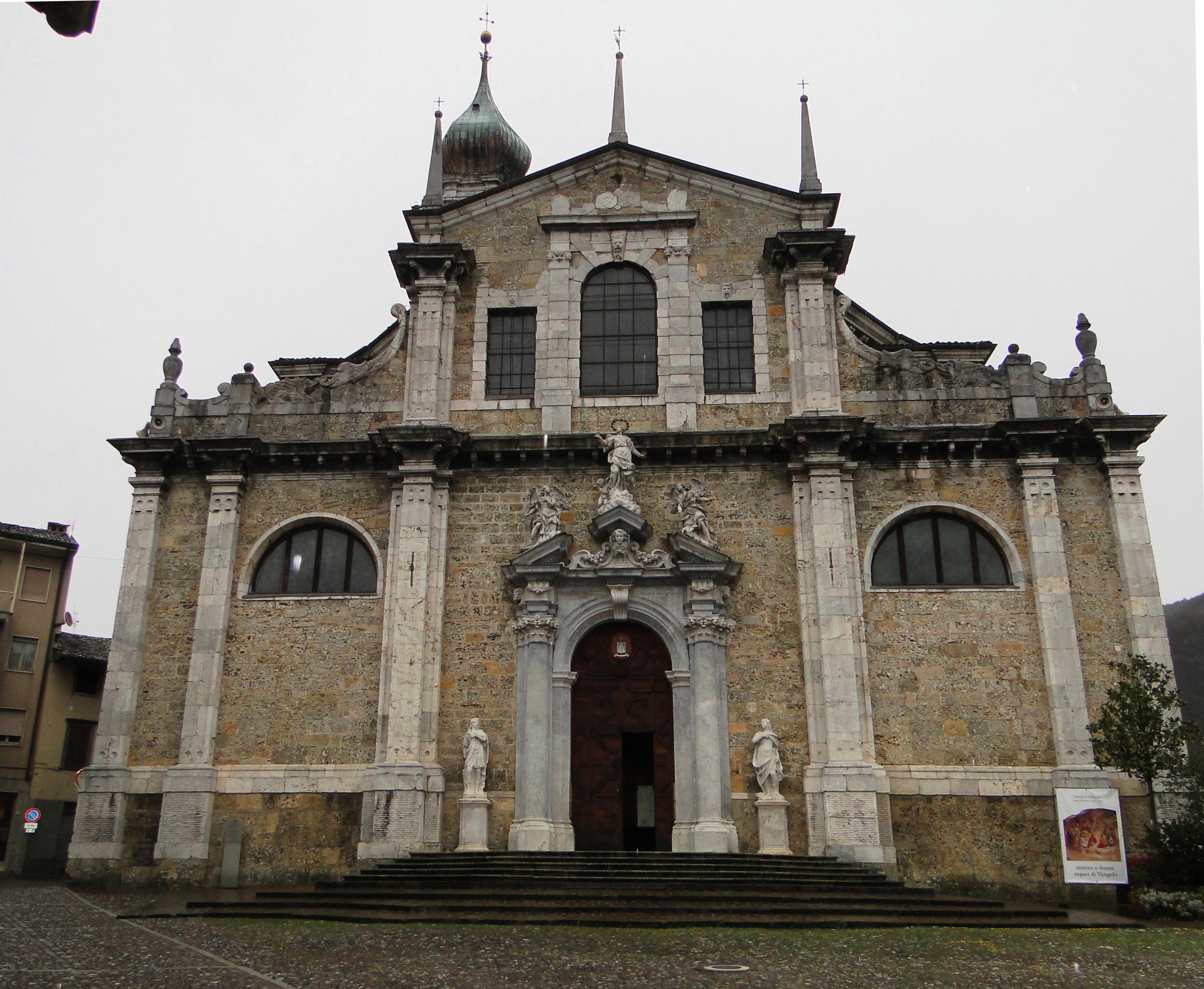
Santa Maria Assunta, Gandino

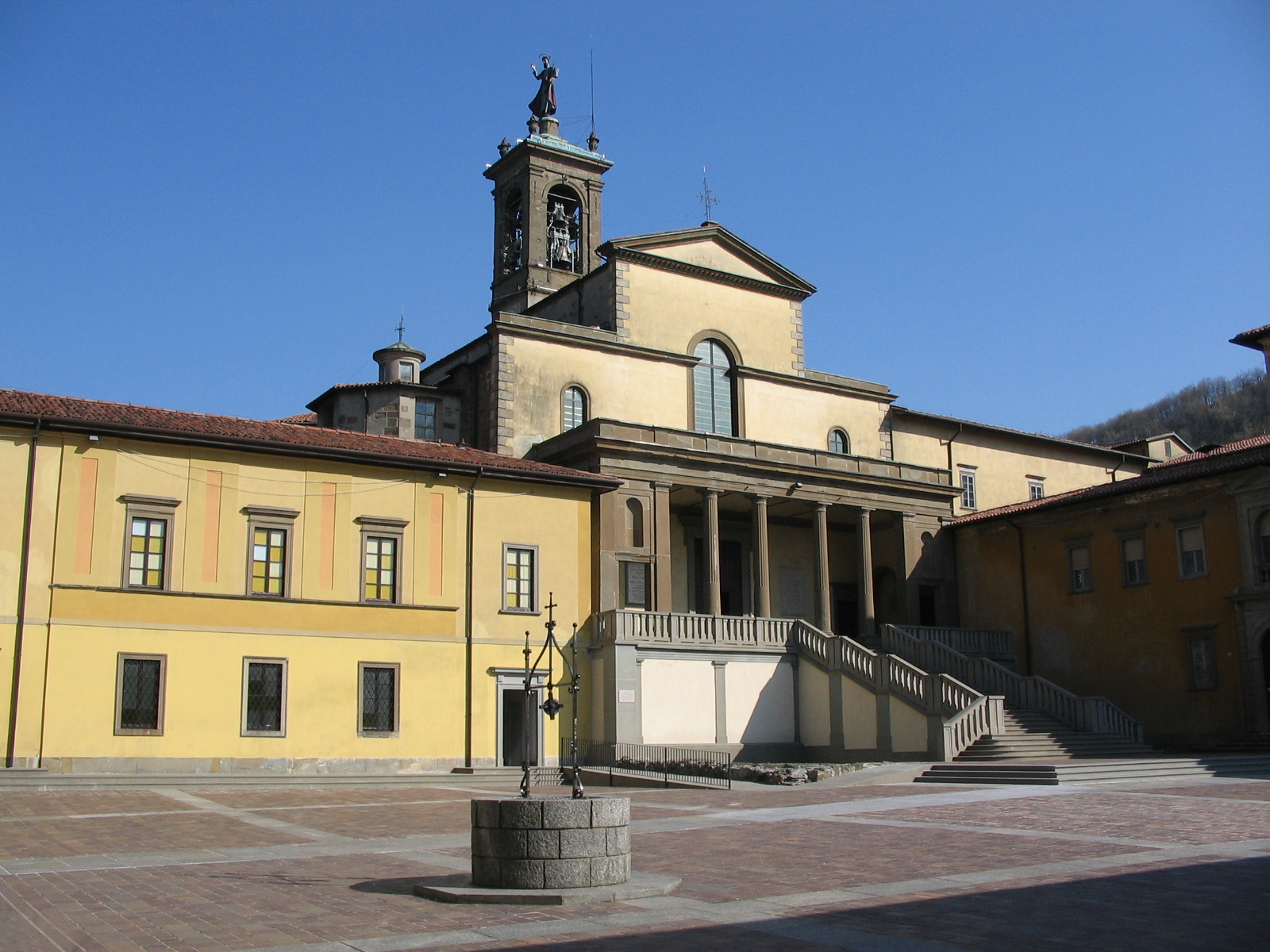
San Giacomo, Pontida

=== Alzano Lombardo ===
- San Martino (1922)

=== Bergamo ===
- Sant'Alessandro in Colonna (1998)

=== Clusone ===
- Santi Maria Assunta e Giovanni Battista (1961)

=== Gandino ===
- Santa Maria Assunta (1911)

=== Pontida ===
- San Giacomo (1911)

=== Vercurago ===
- Santi Bartolomeo e Girolamo Emiliani (1958)

== Biella ==
=== Biella ===
- Santa Maria di Oropa (1957)

== Bologna ==
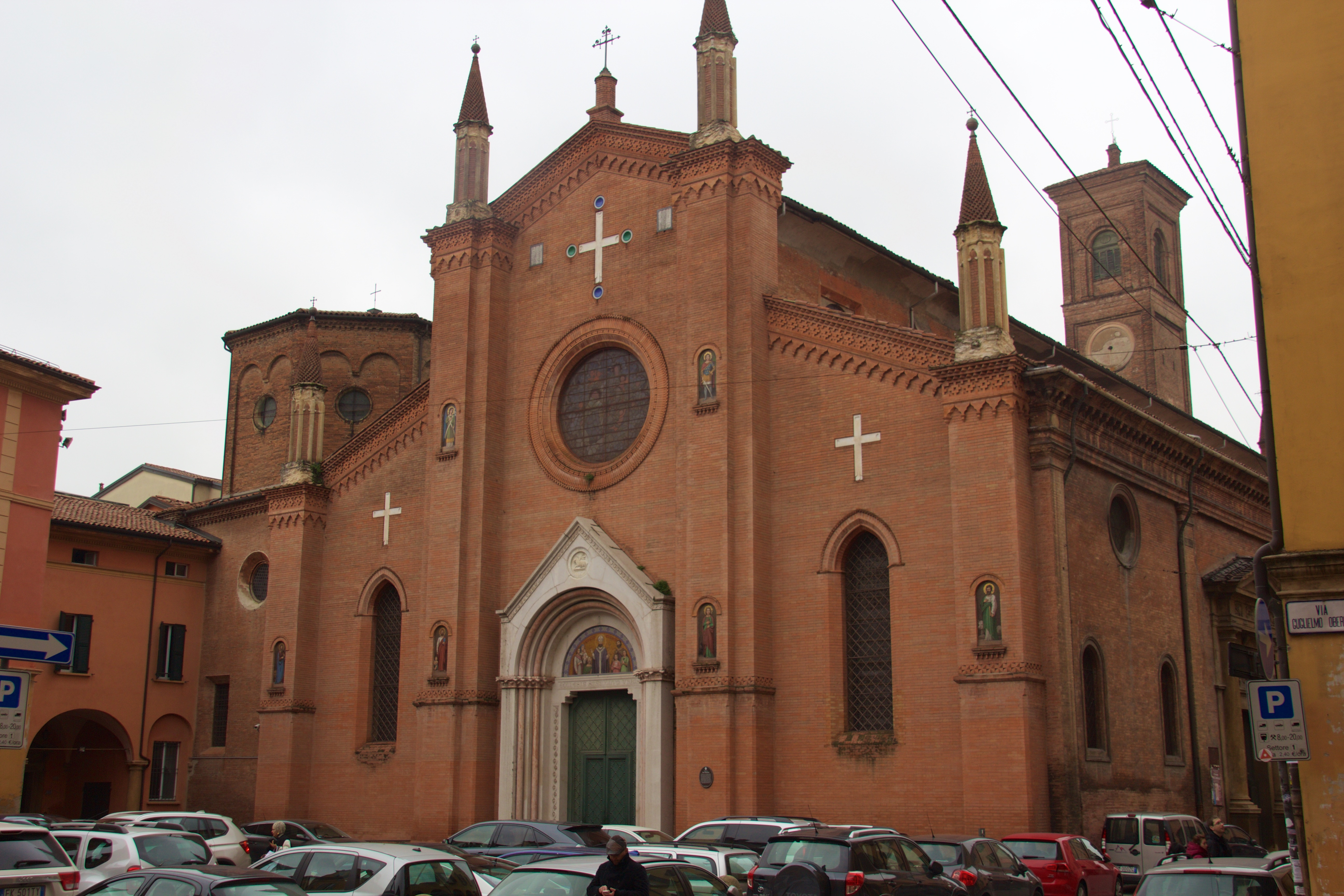
San Martino Maggiore, Bologna

=== Bologna ===
- Sant'Antonio da Padova (1939)
- Santi Bartolomeo e Gaetano (1924)
- San Domenico (1884)
- San Francesco di Bologna (1935)
- Basilica Beata Vergine di San Luca (1907)
- Basilica Collegiata di Santa Maria Maggiore (ancient)
- Santa Maria dei Servi (1954)
- San Martino di Bologna (1941)
- San Petronio Basilica (ancient)
- Santo Stefano (ancient)
- San Giacomo Maggiore

=== Cento ===
- San Blase (1980)

== Bolzano – Brixen ==
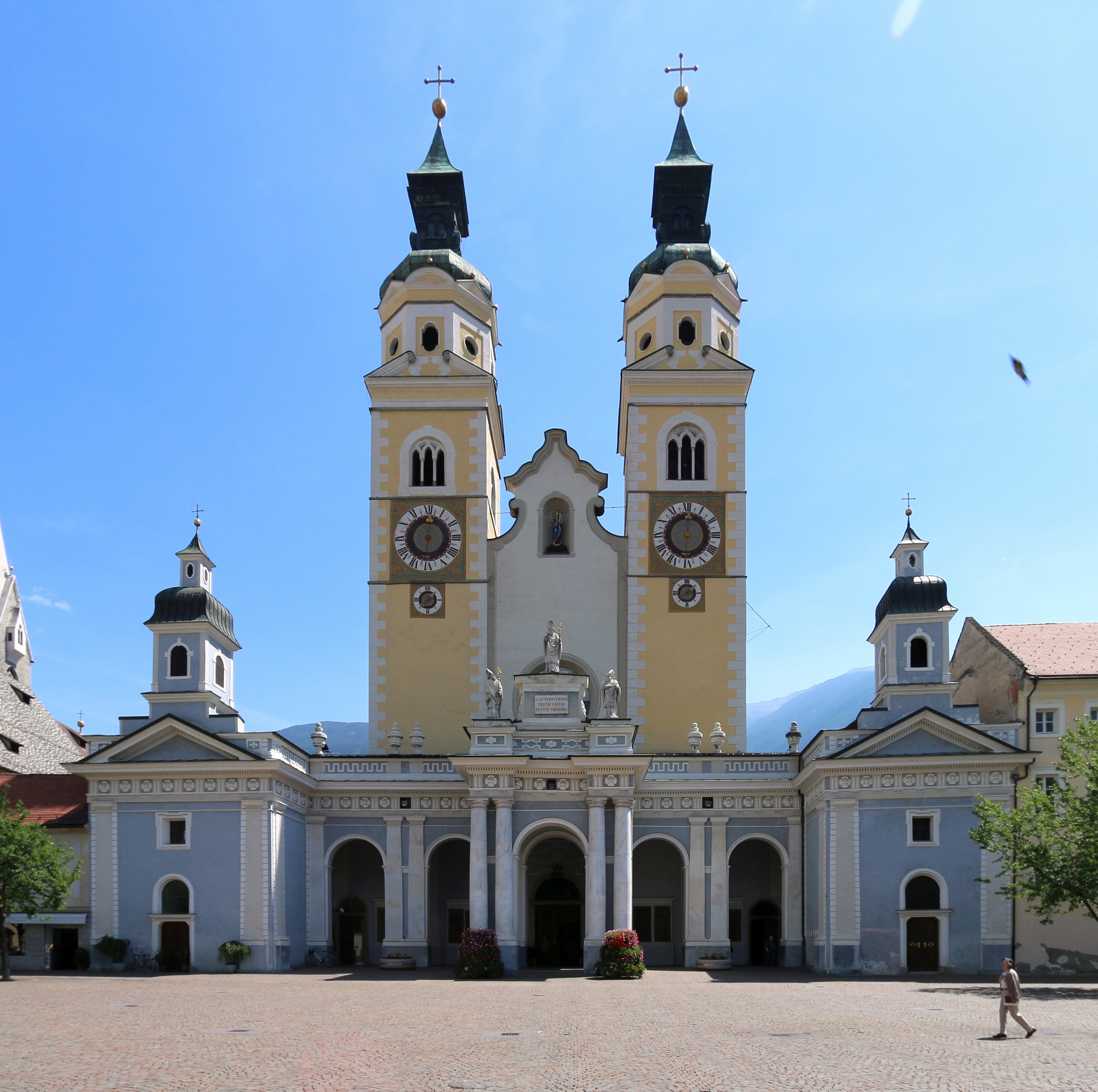
Santa Maria Assunta, Brixen

=== Brixen ===
- Cathedral of Santa Maria Assunta (1950)

=== Deutschnofen ===
- Maria Weissenstein (1985)

=== Vahrn ===
- Santa Maria Assunta (1956)

== Brescia ==
=== Bagnolo Mella ===
- Santa Maria della Visitazione (1999)

=== Brescia ===
- Basilica di San Salvatore (ancient)
- Santa Maria delle Grazie (1963)

=== Concesio ===
- Basilica Sant’Antonino Martire (2016)

=== Montichiari ===
- Santa Maria Assunta (1963)

=== Pralboino ===
- Sant'Andrea Apostolo (2015)

=== Verolanuova ===
- San Lorenzo Martire (1971)

== Brindisi – Ostuni ==
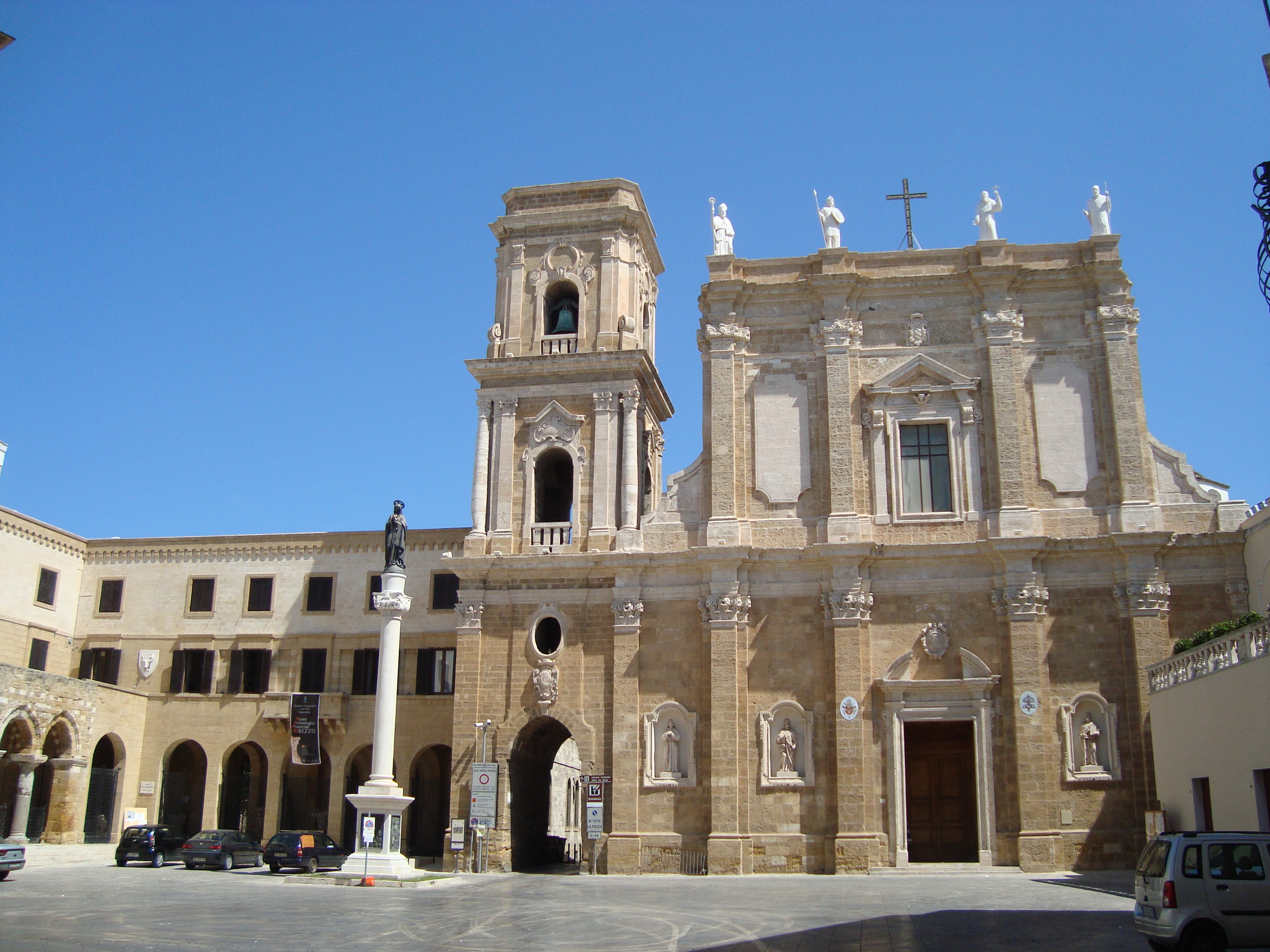
San Giovanni Battista, Brindisi

=== Brindisi ===
- Cathedral of San Giovanni Battista (1867)

=== Mesagne ===
- Santa Maria (1999)

=== San Vito dei Normanni ===
- Santa Maria della Vittoria (1998)

== Cagliari ==
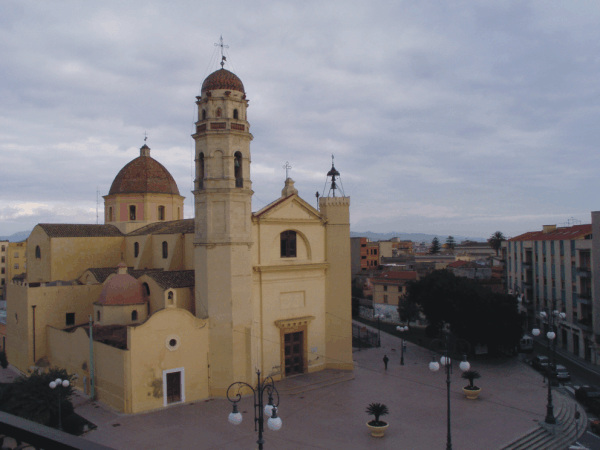
Sant'Elena Imperatrice, Quartu Sant'Elena

=== Cagliari ===
- Basilica di Nostra Signora di Bonaria (1926)
- Basilica di San Saturnino (1119)
- Basilica di Santa Croce (1809)

=== Quartu Sant'Elena ===
- Basilica di Sant'Elena Imperatrice (2007)

== Caltagirone ==
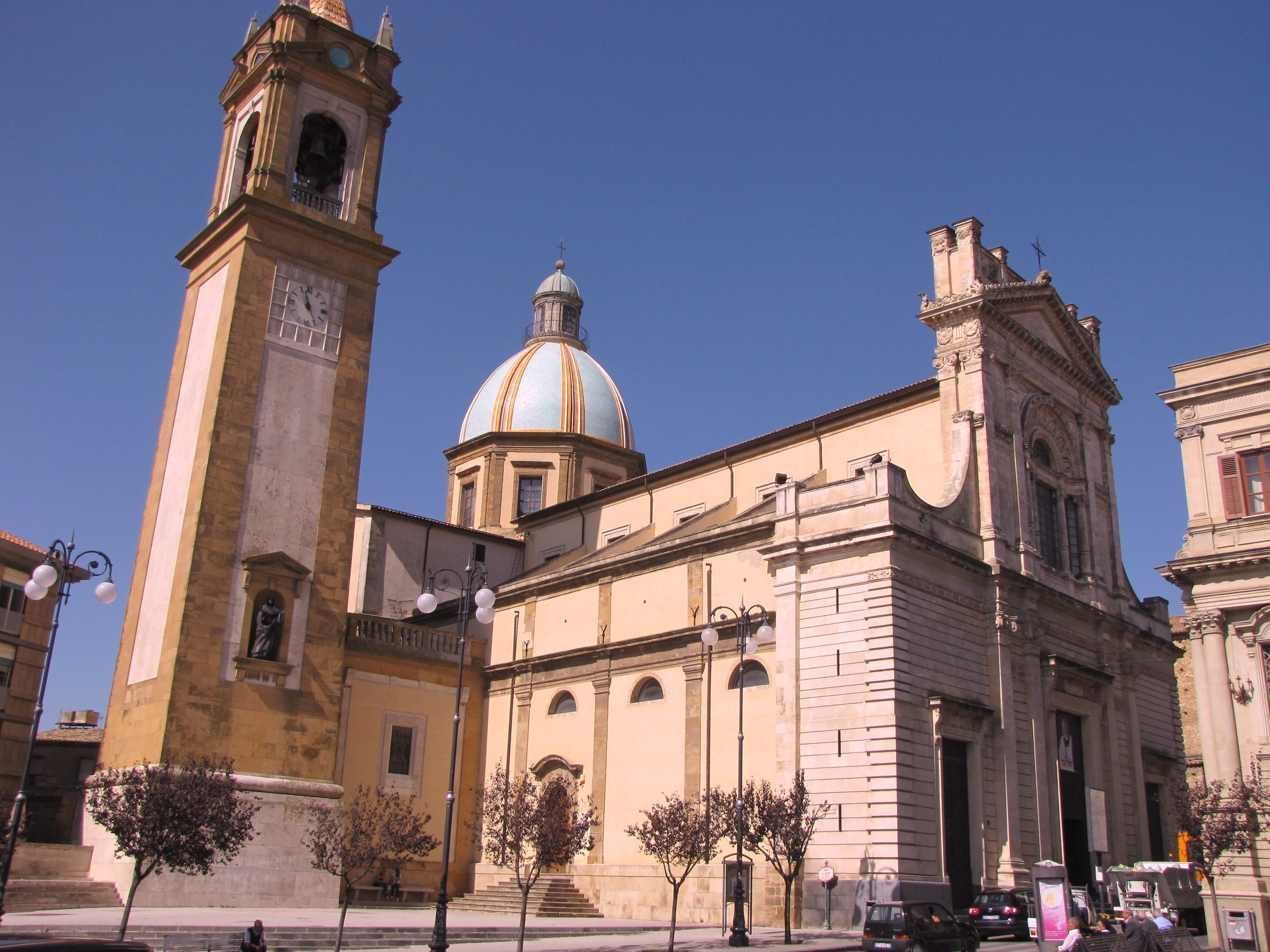
San Giuliano, Caltagirone

=== Caltagirone ===
- San Giacomo Apostolo (1816)
- Cathedral of San Giuliano (1920)
- Santa Maria della Modonna del Monte (1963)

=== Militello in Val di Catania ===
- San Nicolò e del Santissimo Salvatore (2021)

== Camerino – San Severino Marche ==
=== Camerino ===
- Cathedral of Santissima Annunziata (1970)
- San Venanzio (1950)

== Campobasso - Bojano ==
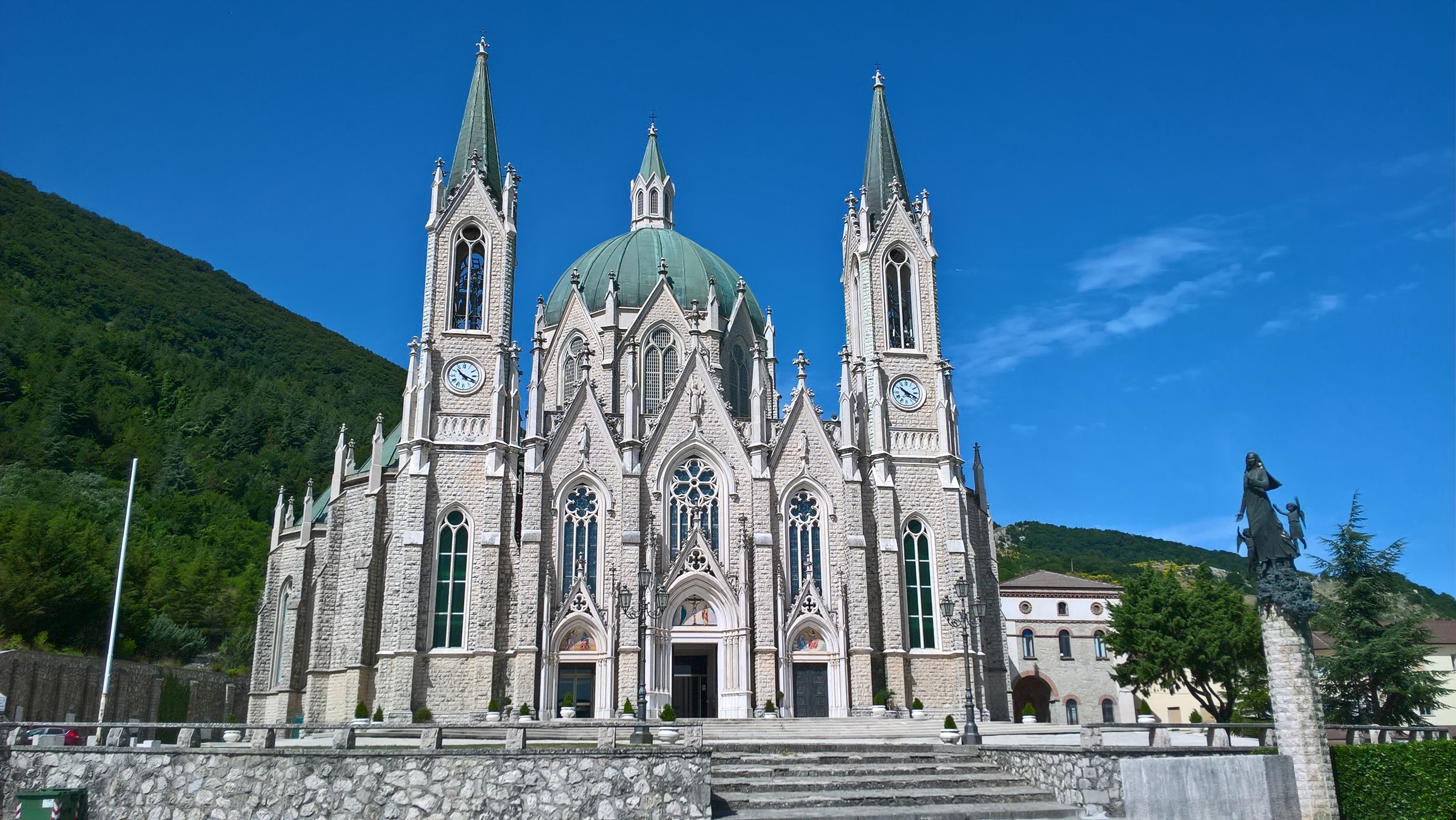
Maria Santissima Addolorata, Castelpetroso

=== Castelpetroso ===
- Maria Santissima Addolorata (2013)

== Capua ==
=== Capua ===
- Sant'Angelo in Formis (ancient)
- Cathedral of Santa Maria Assunta (1827)

== Carpi ==
=== Carpi ===
- Cathedral of Santa Maria Assunta (1979)

== Casale Monferrato ==
=== Casale Monferrato ===
- Sacro Cuore di Gesù (1969)

=== Serralunga di Crea ===
- Sacro Monte di Crea (1951)

== Caserta ==
=== Maddaloni ===
- Corpus Domini (2003)

== Cassano all'Ionio ==
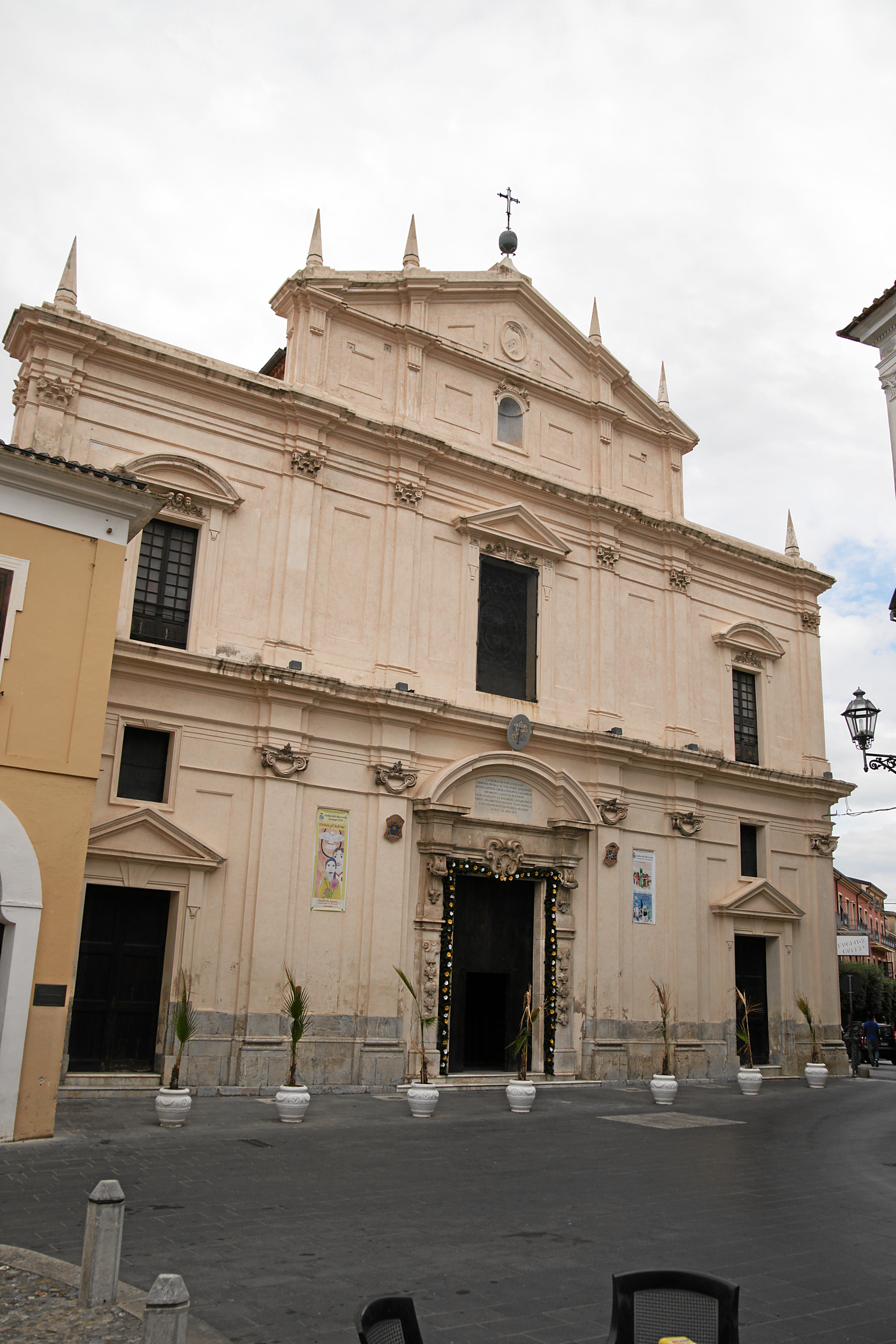
Natività della Beata Vergine Maria del Lauro, Cassano all'Ionio

=== Cassano all'Ionio ===
- Basilica Cattedrale della Natività della Beata Vergine Maria del Lauro (2014)

=== Castrovillari ===
- Basilica Santuario di Santa Maria del Castello (2022)

== Catania ==
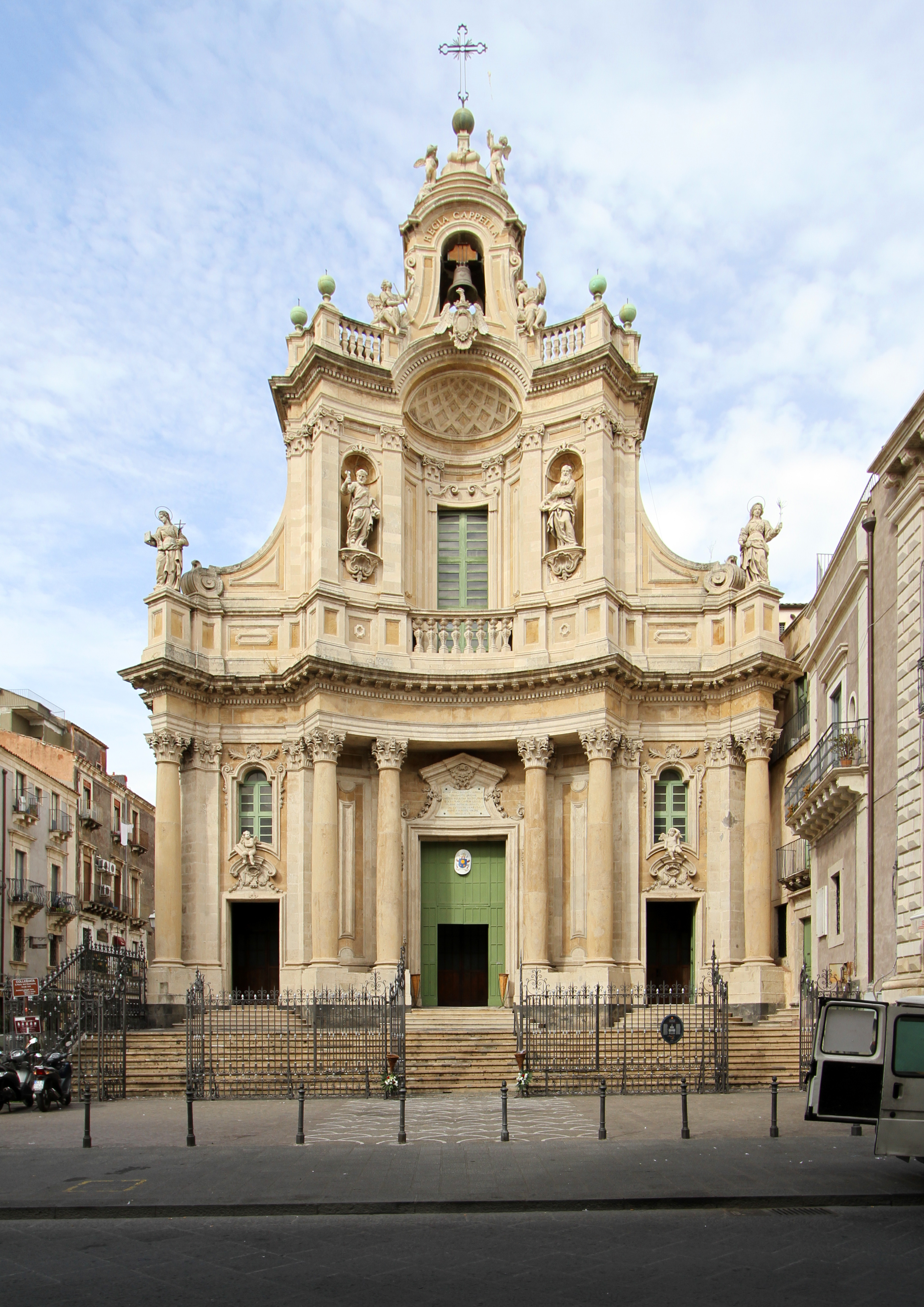
Santa Maria dell'Elemosina, Biancavilla

=== Biancavilla ===
- Santa Maria dell'Elemosina (1970)

=== Catania ===
- Maria Santissima Annunziata al Carmine (1987)
- Cathedral of Sant'Agata (1926)
- Santa Maria dell'Elemosina (1946)

=== Pedara ===
- Santa Caterina (1996)

== Catanzaro – Squillace ==
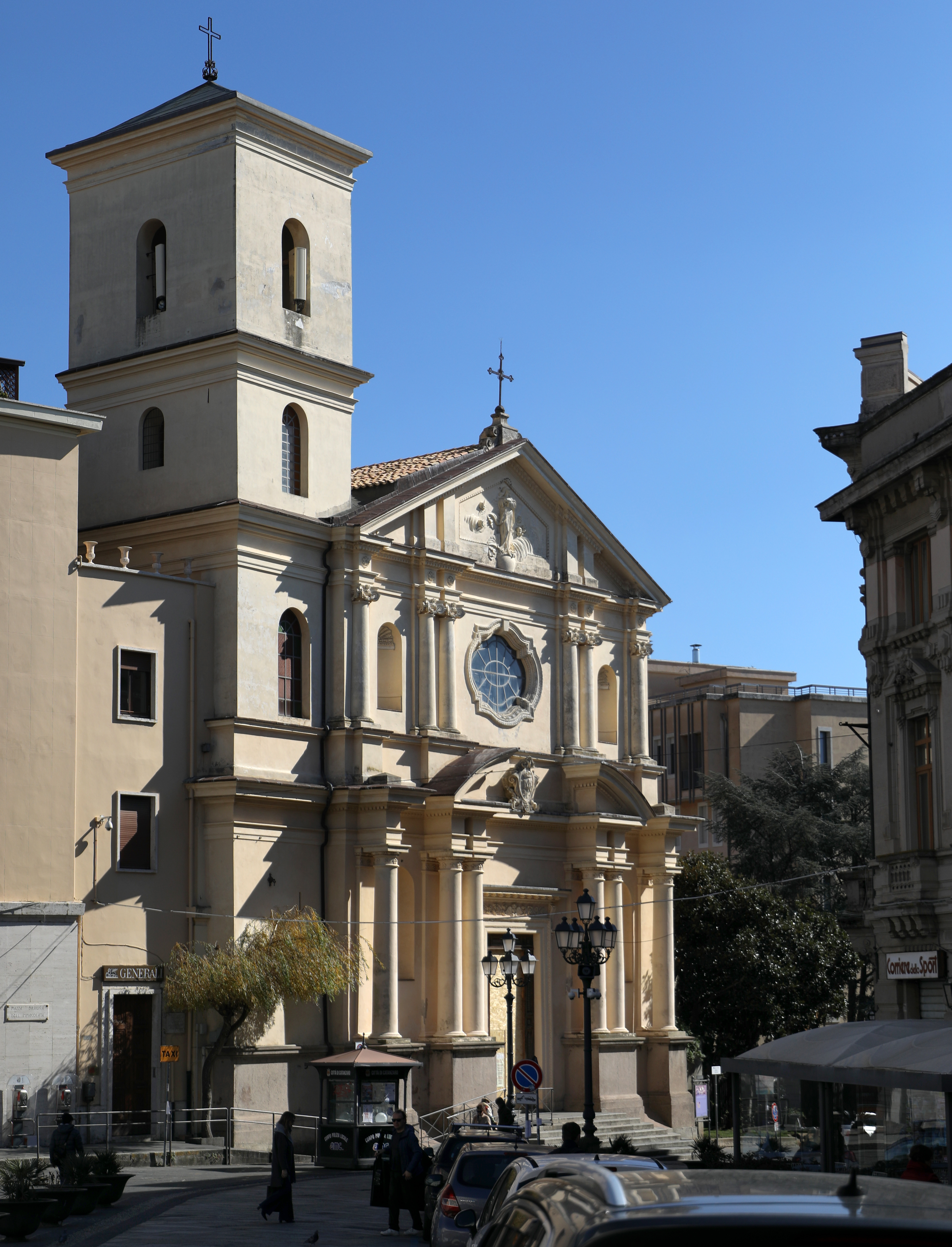
Maria Santissima Immacolata, Catanzaro

=== Catanzaro ===
- Maria Santissima Immacolata (1954)

=== Squillace ===
- Co-Cathedral of Santa Maria Assunta (2014)

== Cefalù ==
=== Cefalù ===
- Cathedral of the Transfiguration (ancient)

=== Collesano ===
- San Pietro (1983)

=== Montemaggiore Belsito ===
- Sant'Agata (ancient)

== Cerignola – Ascoli Satriano ==
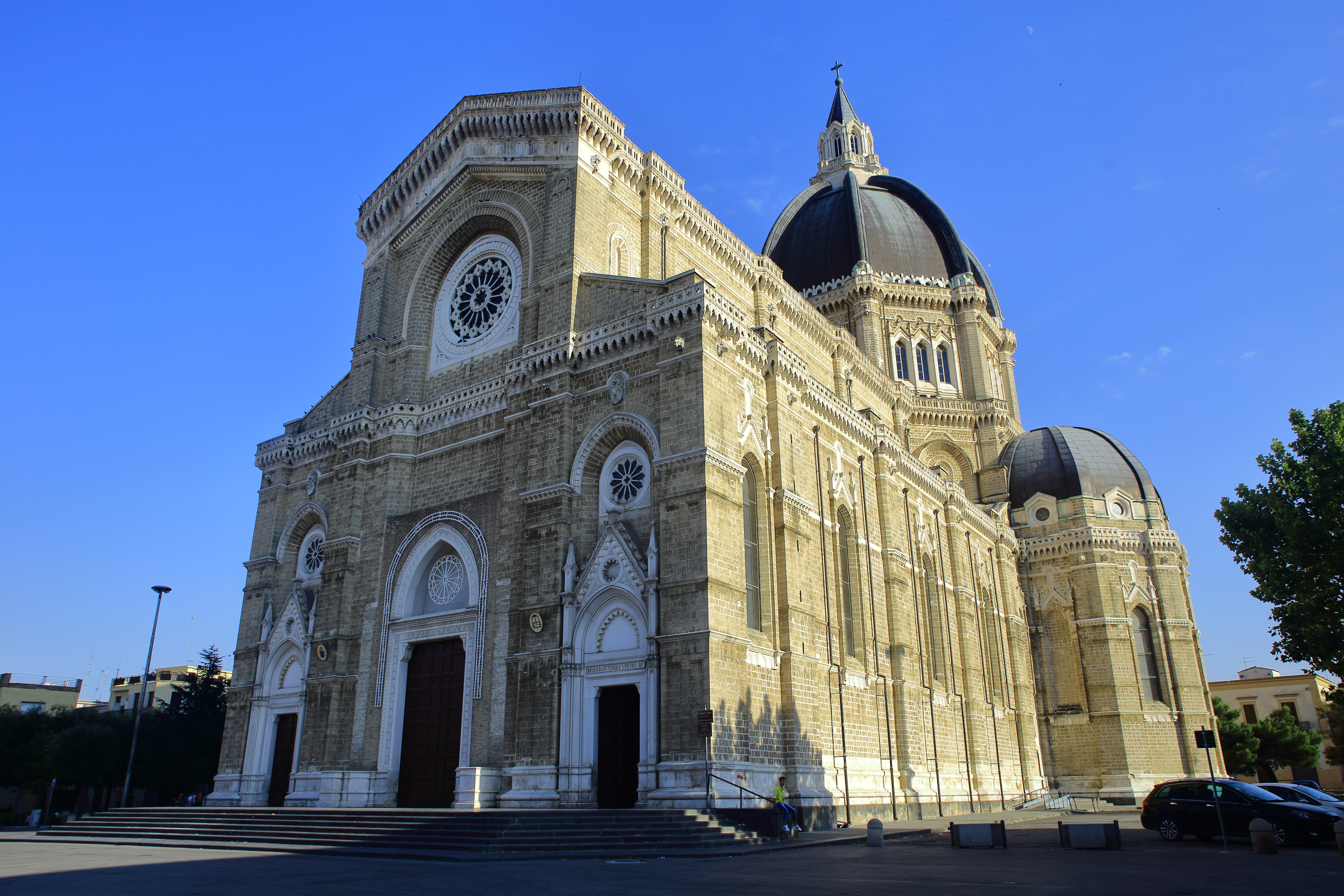
San Pietro Apostolo, Cerignola

=== Cerignola ===
- Cathedral of San Pietro Apostolo (1999)

== Cerreto Sannita – Telese – Sant'Agata de' Goti ==
=== Guardia Sanframondi ===
- Santa Maria Assunta (1989)

== Cesena – Sarsina ==
=== Cesena ===
- Cathedral of San Giovanni Battista (1960)
- Santa Maria del Monte (ancient)

=== Sarsina ===
- Co-Cathedral of Santi Maria Annunziata e Vicinio (1961)

== Chiavari ==
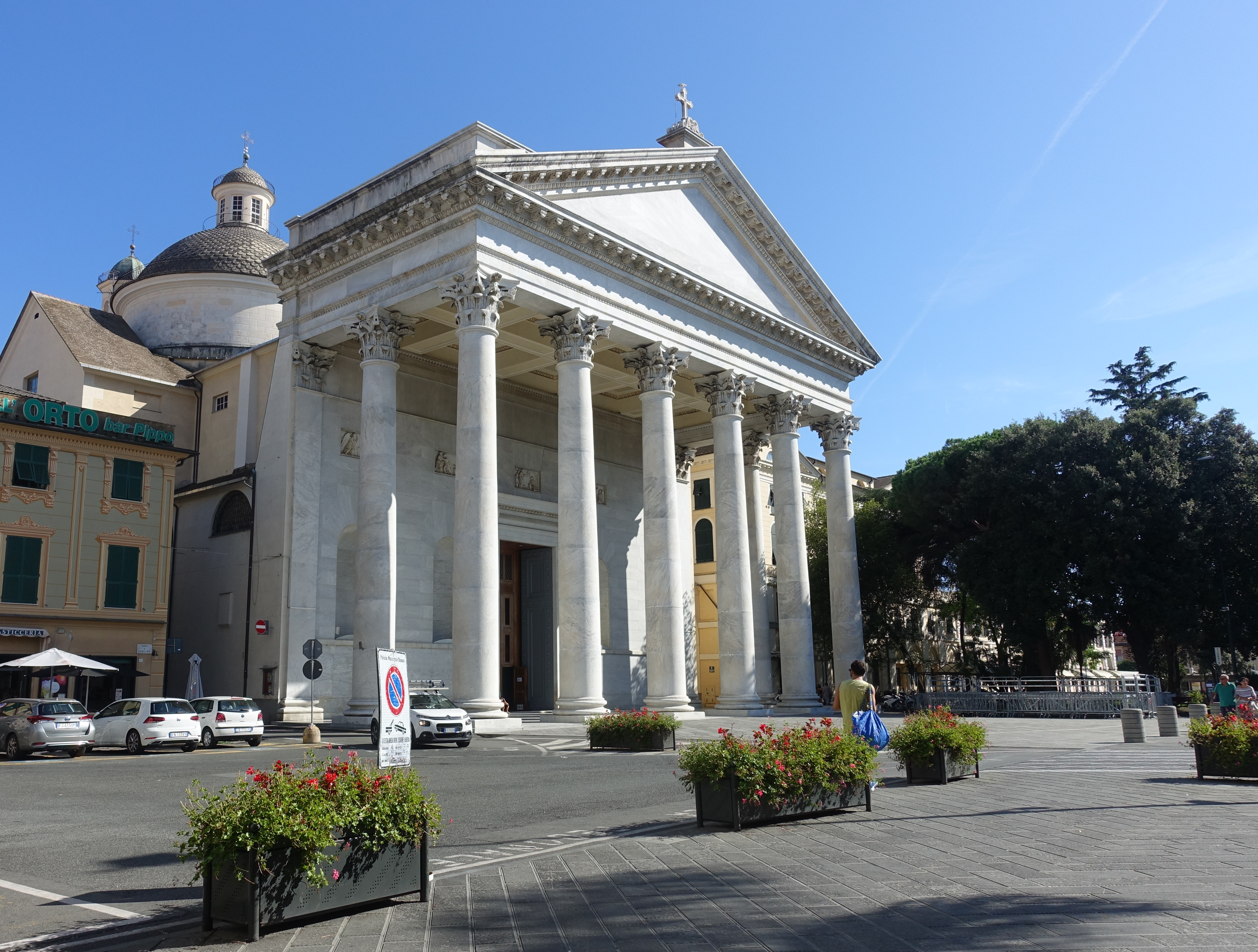
Nostra Signora dell'Orto e di Montallegro, Chiavari

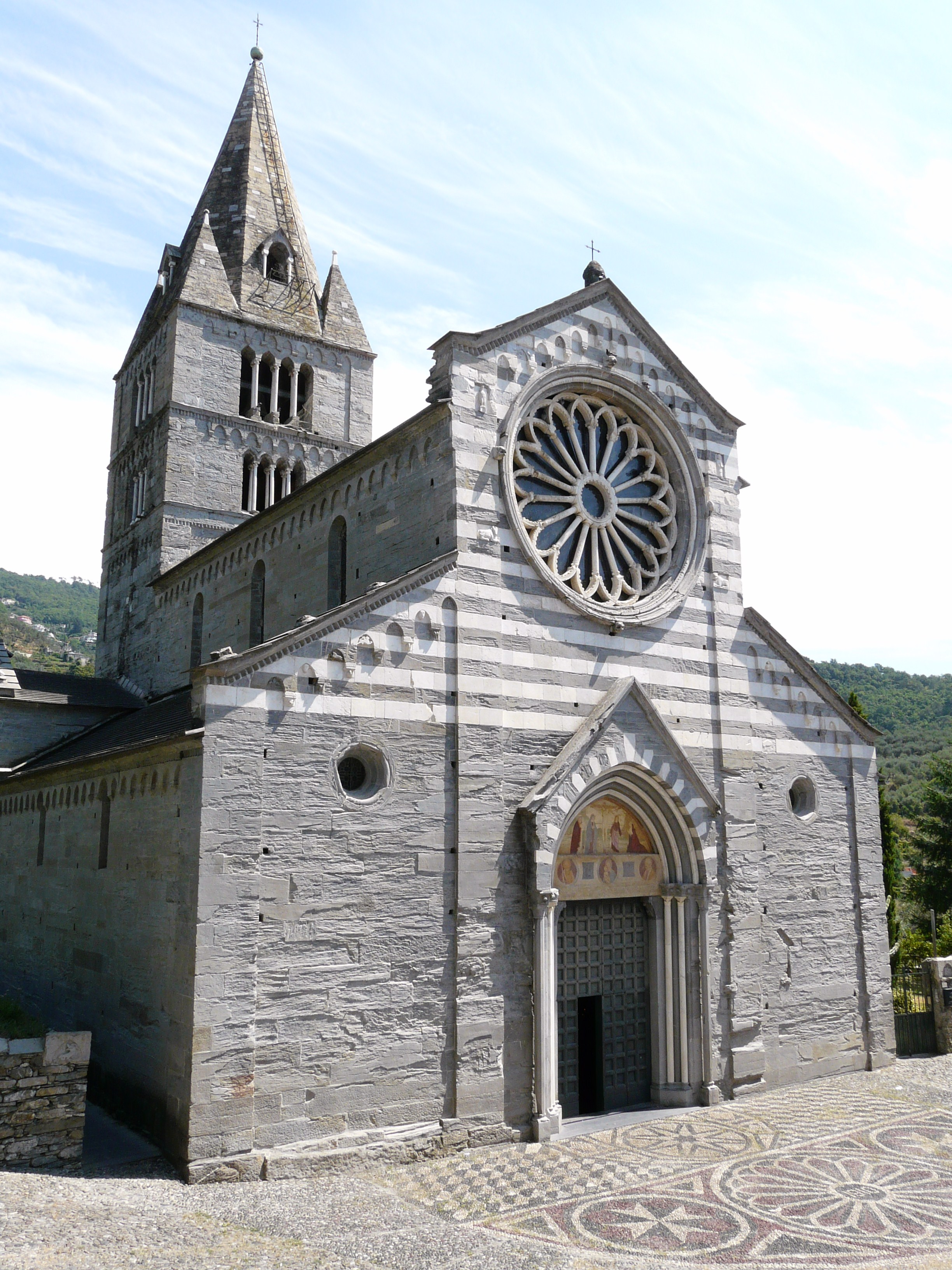
San Salvatore, Cogorno

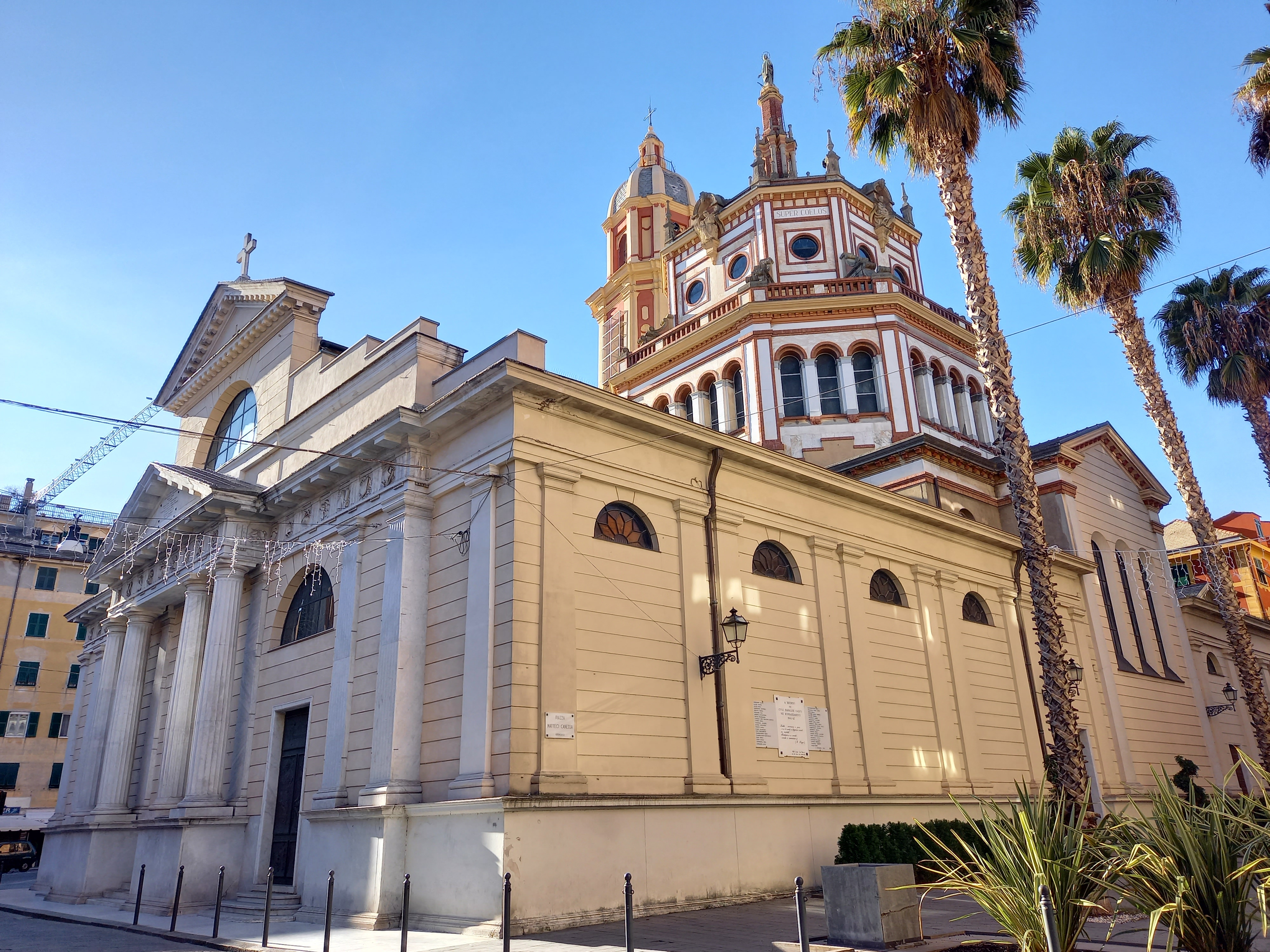
Santi Gervasio e Protasio, Rapallo

=== Chiavari ===
- Cathedral of Nostra Signora dell'Orto e di Montallegro (1904)

=== Cogorno ===
- San Salvatore (ancient)

=== Lavagna ===
- Santo Stefano (1921)

=== Rapallo ===
- Sanctuary of Monteallegro (1942)
- Santi Gervasio e Protasio (1925)

=== Santa Margherita Ligure ===
- Santa Margherita d'Antiochia (1951)

=== Sestri Levante ===
- Santa Maria di Nazareth (1962)

== Chieti – Vasto ==
=== Manoppello ===
- Santuario del Volto Santo (2006)

== Chioggia ==
=== Chioggia ===
- Madonna della Navicella (1906)

== Città di Castello ==
=== Città di Castello ===
- Cathedral of San Florido (1888)

== Civita Castellana ==
=== Castel Sant'Elia ===
- Santa Maria ad Rupes (1912)
- Sant'Elia

=== Città di Castello ===
- Madonna del Transito (1998)

=== Civita Castellana ===
- Cathedral of Santa Maria (ancient)

== Como ==
=== Como ===
- San Giorgio (1941)
- Cathedral of Santa Maria Assunta (1951)

=== Tirano ===
- Santa Maria dell'Apparizione (1927)

== Conversano – Monopoli ==
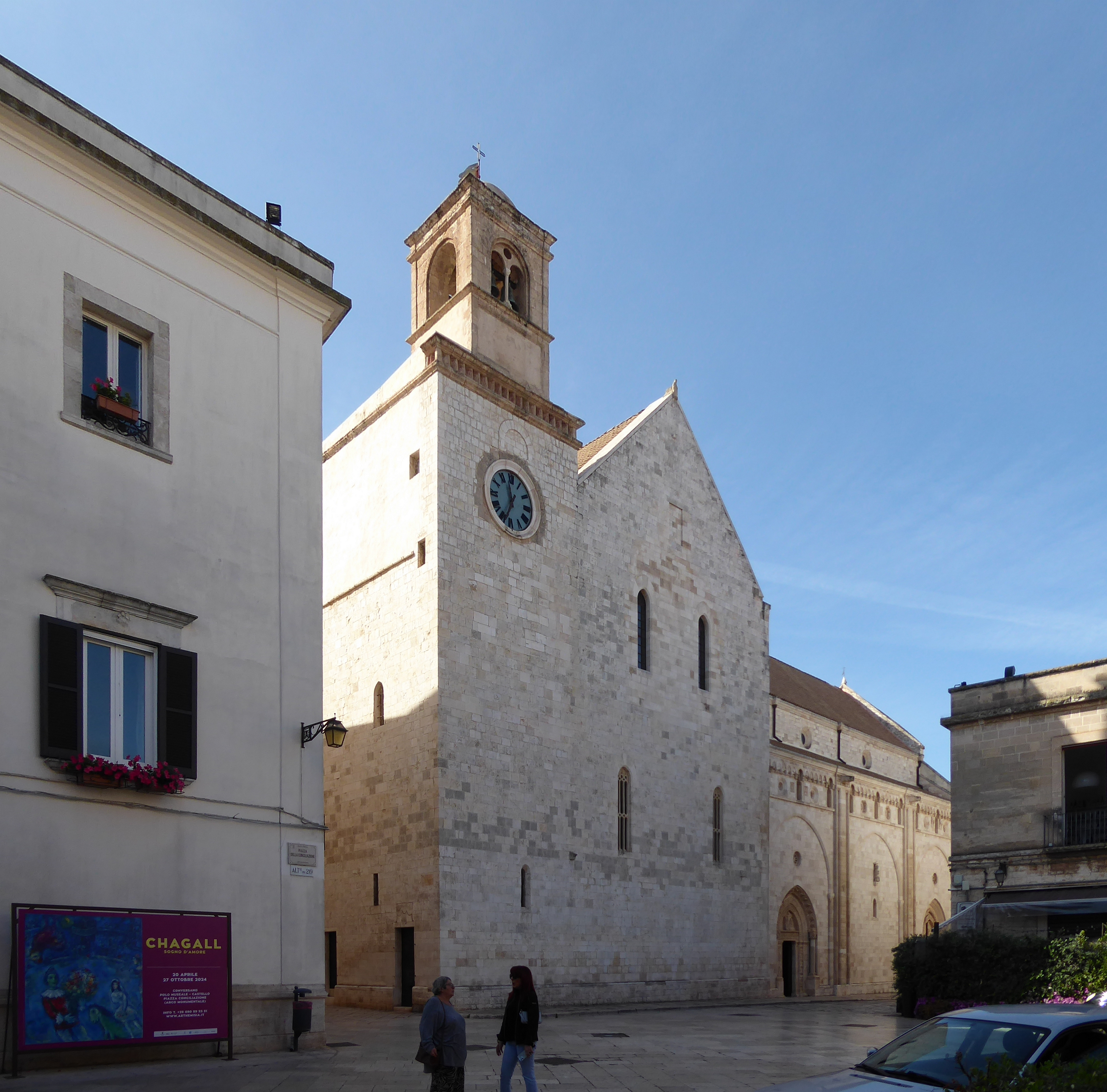
Santa Maria Assunta, Conversano

=== Alberobello ===
- Santi Cosma e Damiano (2000)

=== Conversano ===
- Cathedral of Santa Maria Assunta (1997)

=== Monopoli ===
- Co-Cathedral of Santa Maria della Mactia (1921)

== Cosenza – Bisignano ==
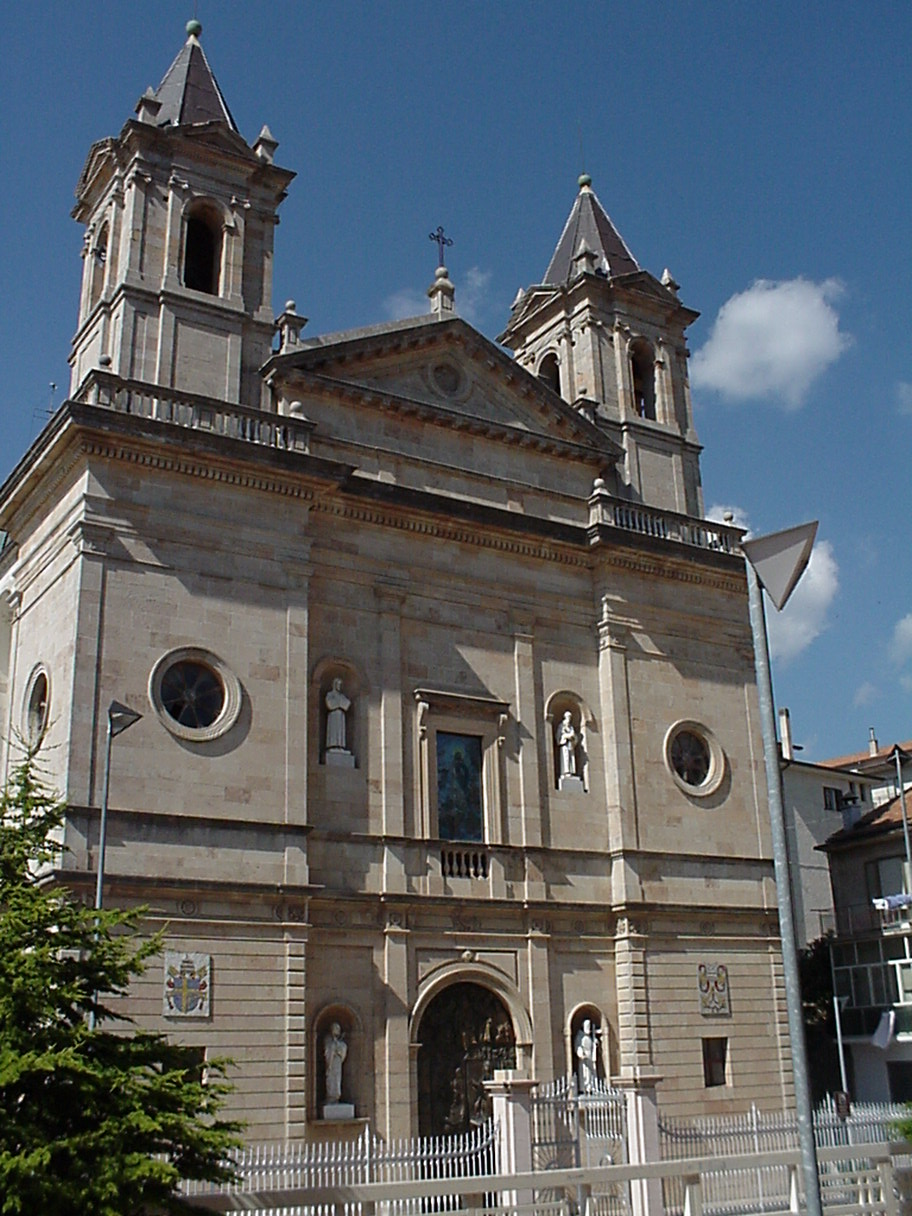
Beato Angelo, Cosenza

=== Cosenza ===
- Santuario del Beato Angelo (1980)

=== Dipignano ===
- Madonna della Catena (1966)

=== Paola ===
- San Francesco di Paola (1921)

== Crema ==
=== Crema ===
- Santa Maria della Croce, Crema (1958)

== Cremona ==
=== Caravaggio ===
- Nostra Signora di Caravaggio (1906)

== Crotone – Santa Severina ==
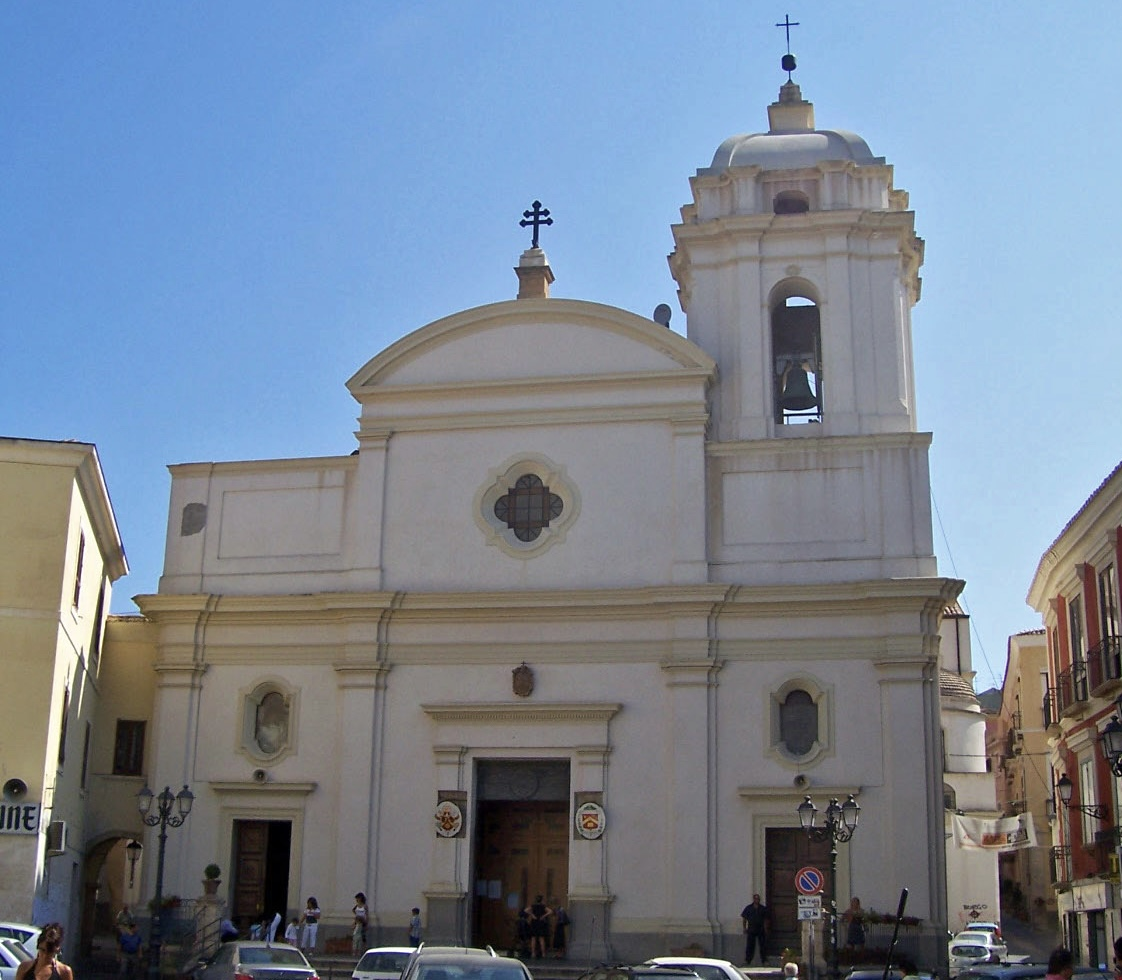
Santa Maria Assunta, Crotone

=== Crotone ===
- Cathedral of Santa Maria Assunta (1983)

== Fabriano – Matelica ==
=== Fabriano ===
- Cathedral of San Venanzio (1963)

== Faenza – Modigliana ==
=== Faenza ===
- Cathedral of San Pietro (1948)

== Fano – Fossombrone – Cagli – Pergola ==
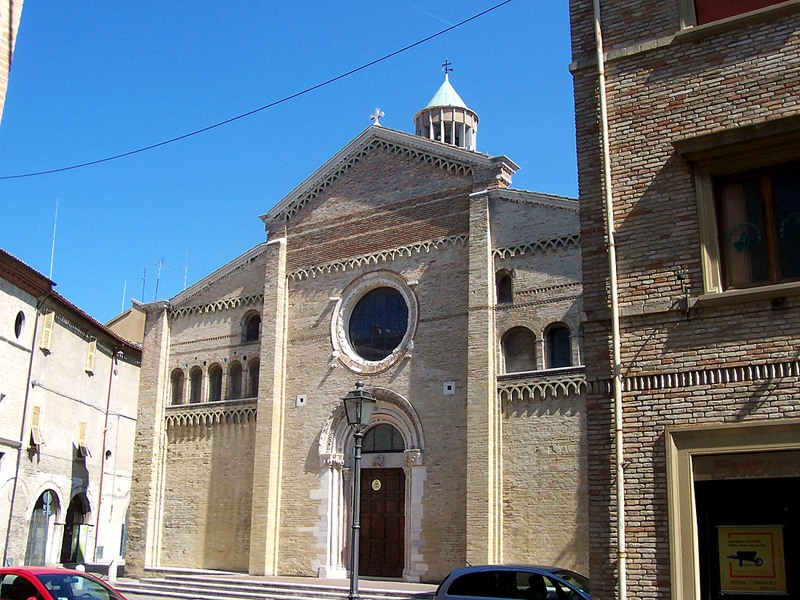
Santa Maria Assunta, Fano

=== Cagli ===
- Co-Cathedral of Santa Maria Assunta (1982)

=== Fano ===
- Cathedral of Santa Maria Assunta (1953)
- San Paterniano (ancient)

=== Pergola ===
- San Lorenzo in Campo (1943)

=== Serra Sant'Abbondio ===
- Santa Croce di Fonte Avellana (1982)

== Fermo ==
=== Fermo ===
- Cathedral of Santa Maria Assunta (1962)

== Ferrara – Comacchio ==
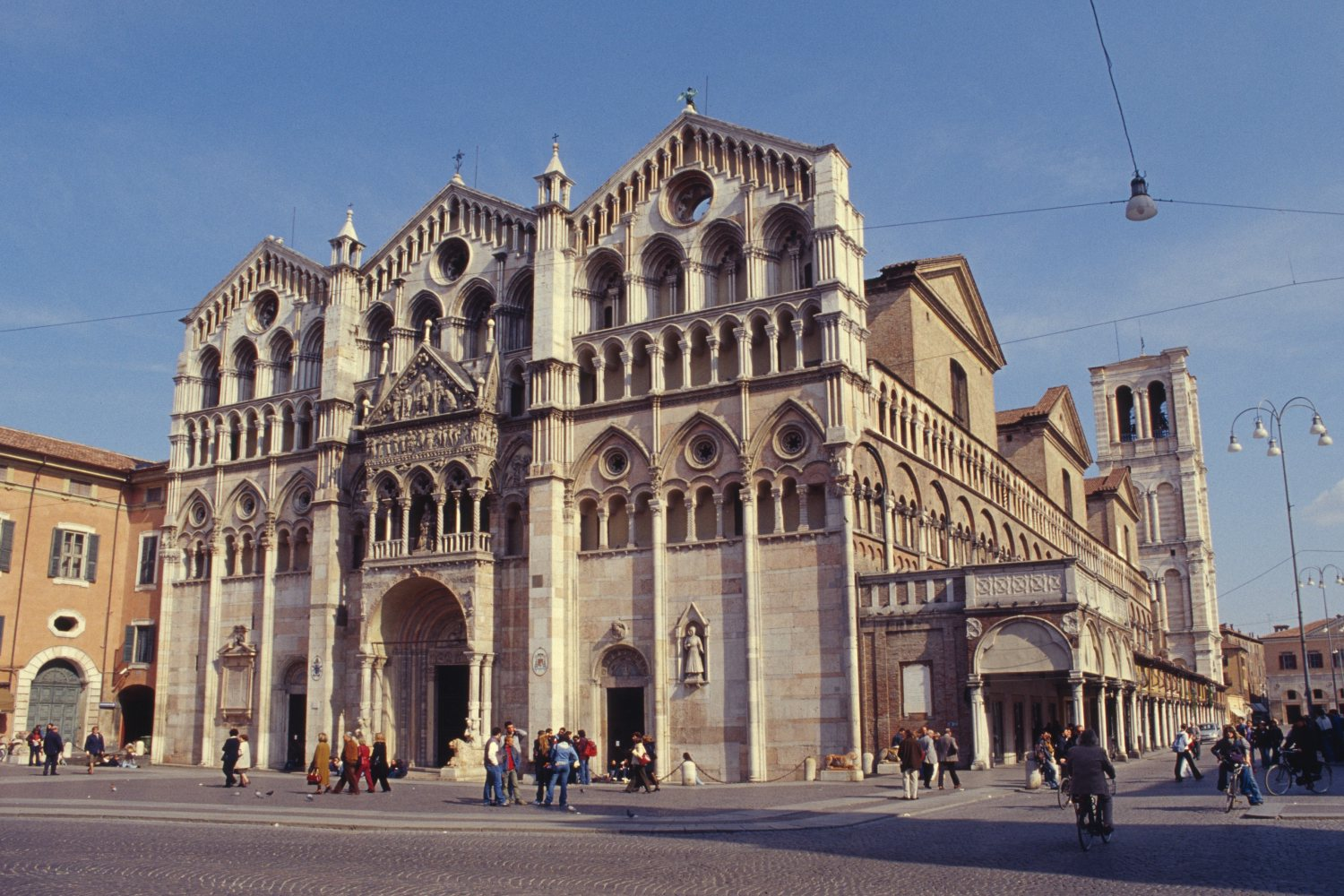
Cathedral of San Giorgio, Ferrara

=== Comacchio ===
- Co-Cathedral of San Cassiano Martire (1961)

=== Ferrara ===
- San Francesco d'Assisi (1956)
- Cathedral of San Giorgio (1959)

== Fidenza ==
=== Monticelli d'Ongina ===
- San Lorenzo (1942)

== Fiesole ==
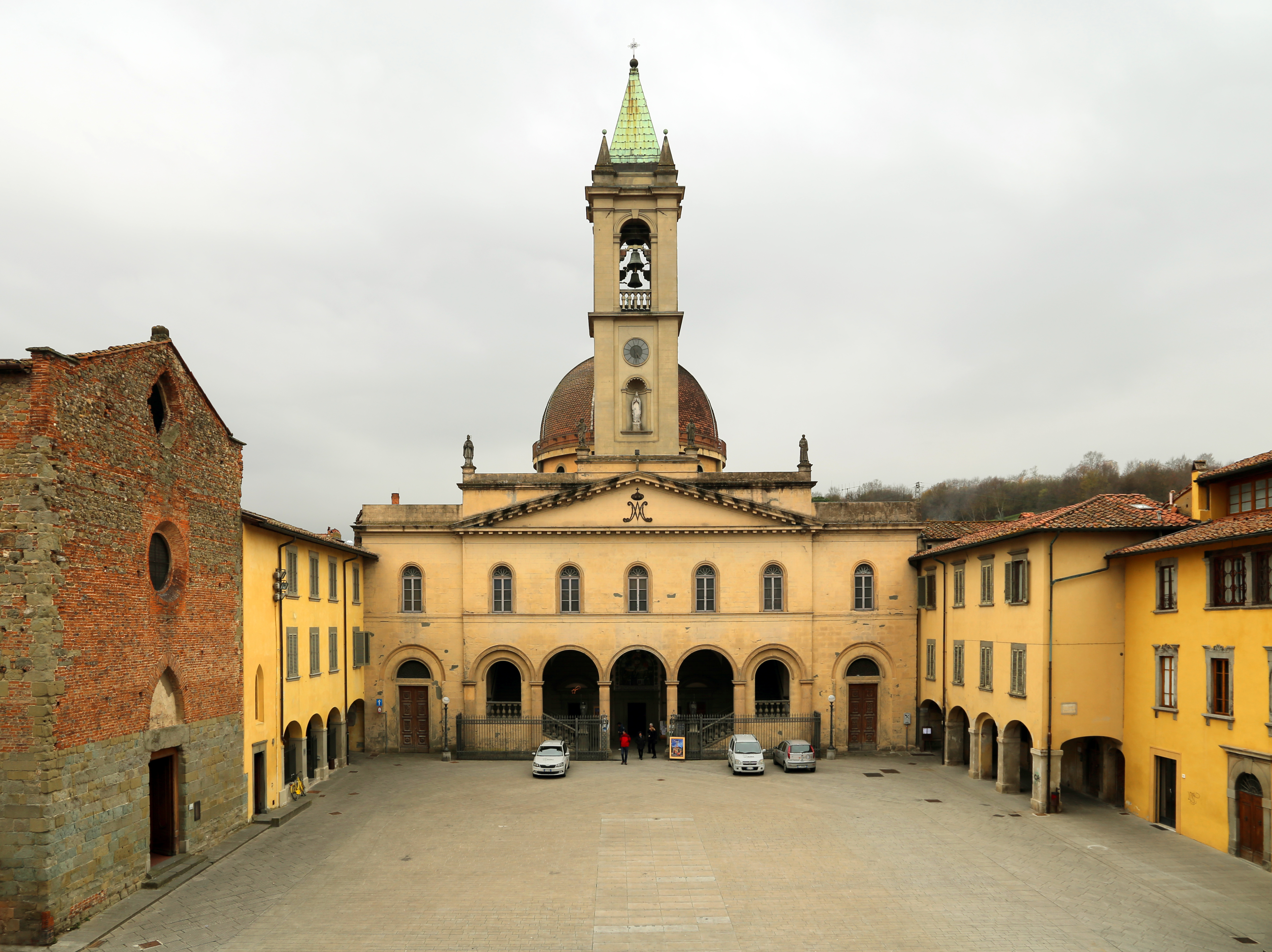
Santa Maria delle Grazie, San Giovanni Valdarno

=== Reggello ===
- Santa Maria Assunta di Vallombrosa (1950)

=== San Giovanni Valdarno ===
- Santa Maria delle Grazie (1929)

== Florence ==
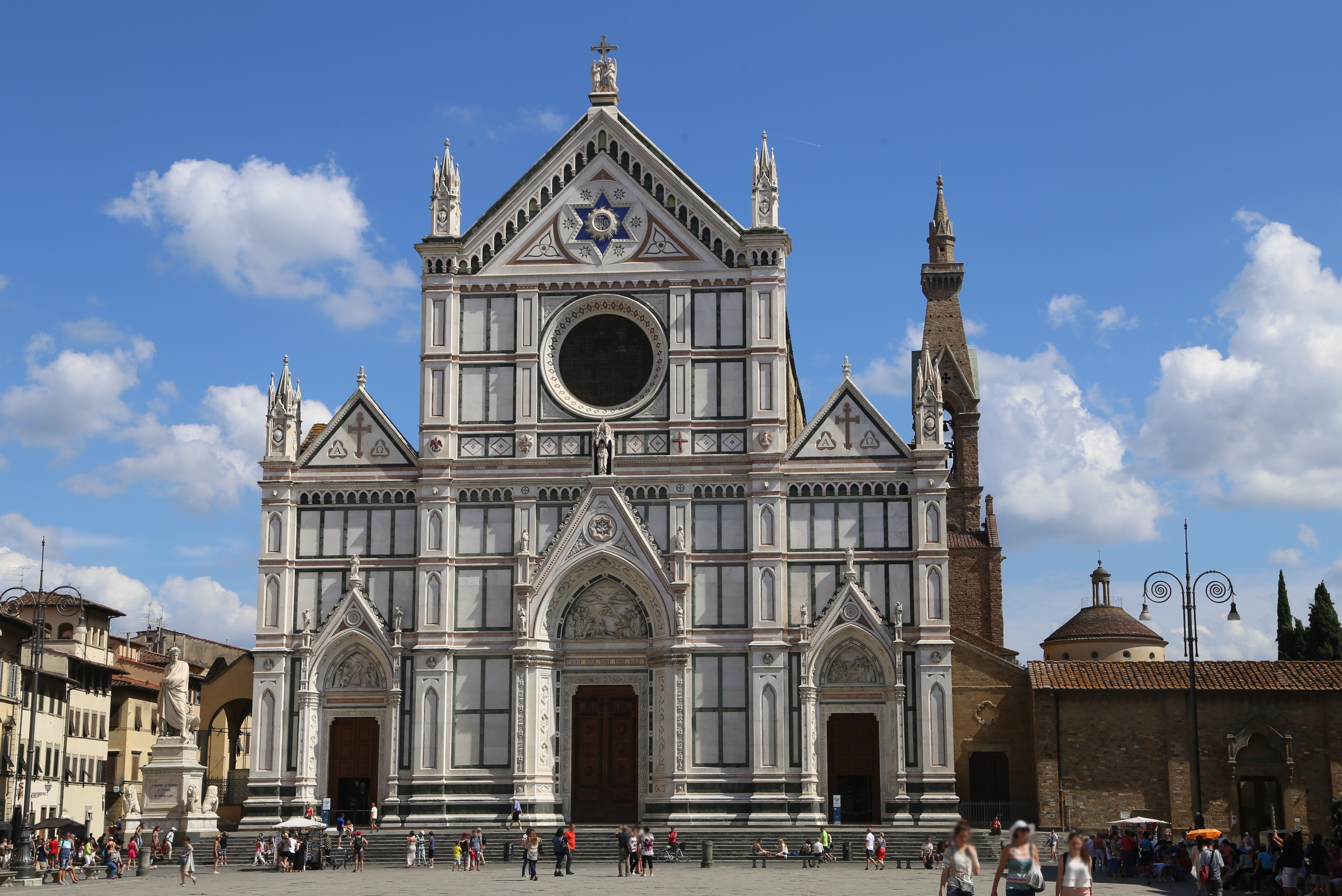
Santa Croce, Florence

=== Florence ===
- Baptistery of San Giovanni (ancient)
- Santissima Annunziata (1806)
- Santa Croce (1933)
- San Lorenzo (ancient)
- San Marco (1942)
- Santa Maria del Carmine (1954)
- Cathedral of Santa Maria del Fiore (ancient)
- Santa Maria Novella (1919)
- San Miniato al Monte (ancient)
- Santo Spirito (ancient)
- Santa Trinita (ancient)

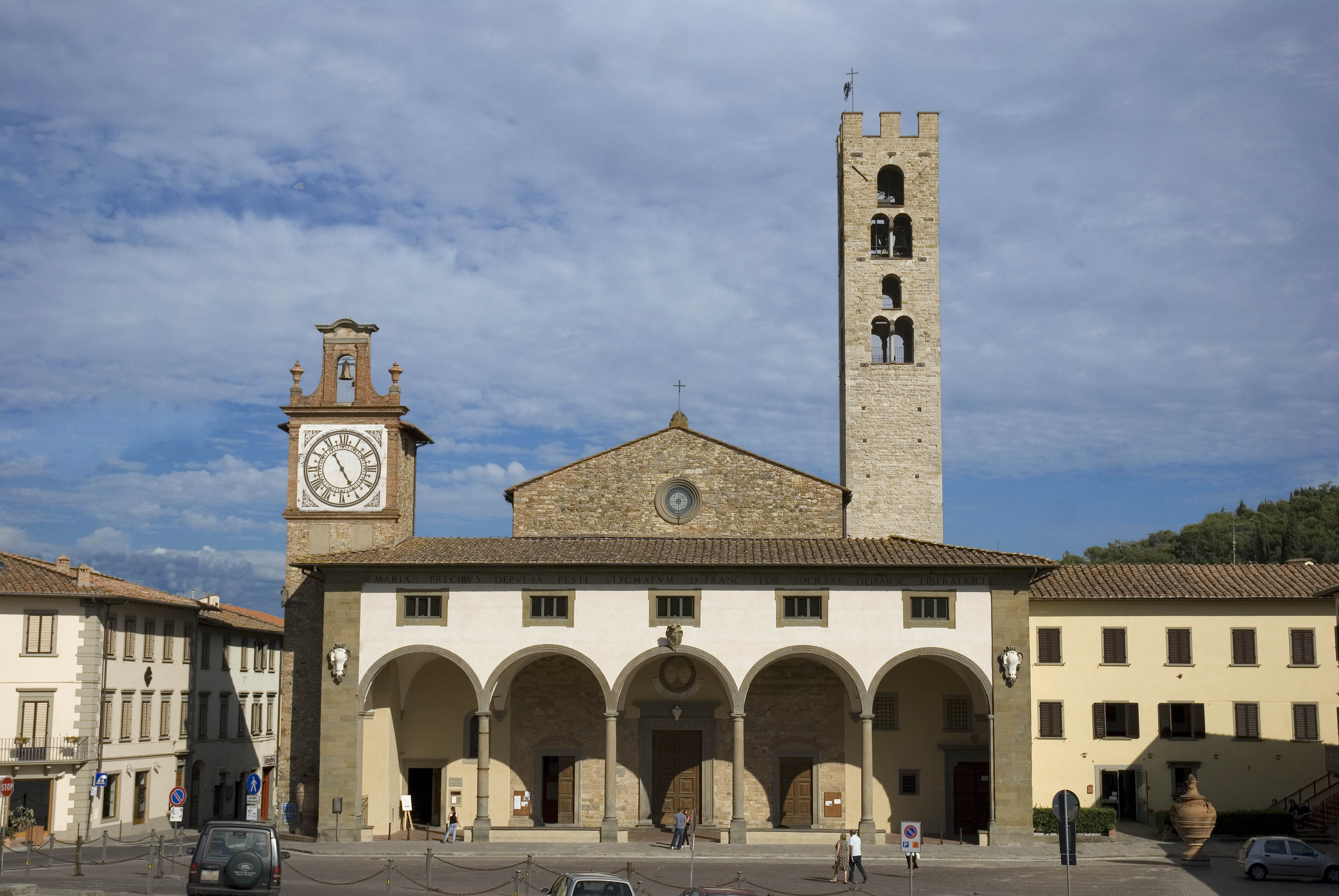
Santa Maria, Impruneta

=== Impruneta ===
- Santa Maria all'Impruneta (1924)

=== Vaglia ===
- Santi Maria Addolorata e Filippo Benizi di Monte Senario (1917)

== Foggia – Bovino ==
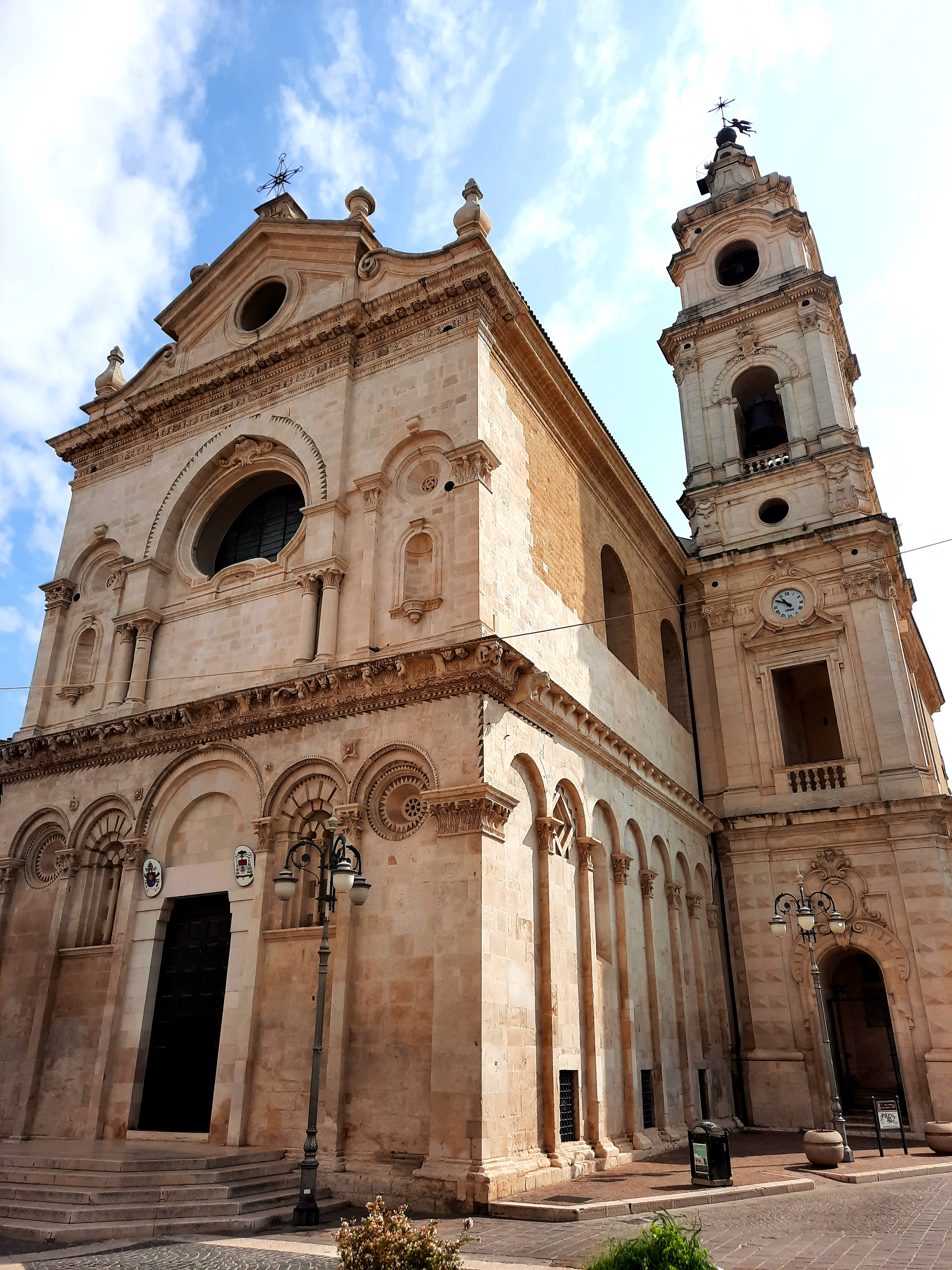
Cathedral of the Iconavetere, Foggia

=== Bovino ===
- Co-Cathedral of Santa Maria Assunta (1970)

=== Foggia ===
- Cathedral of the Iconavetere (1806)
- San Giovanni Battista (ancient)
- Santa Maria (1978)

== Forlì – Bertinoro ==
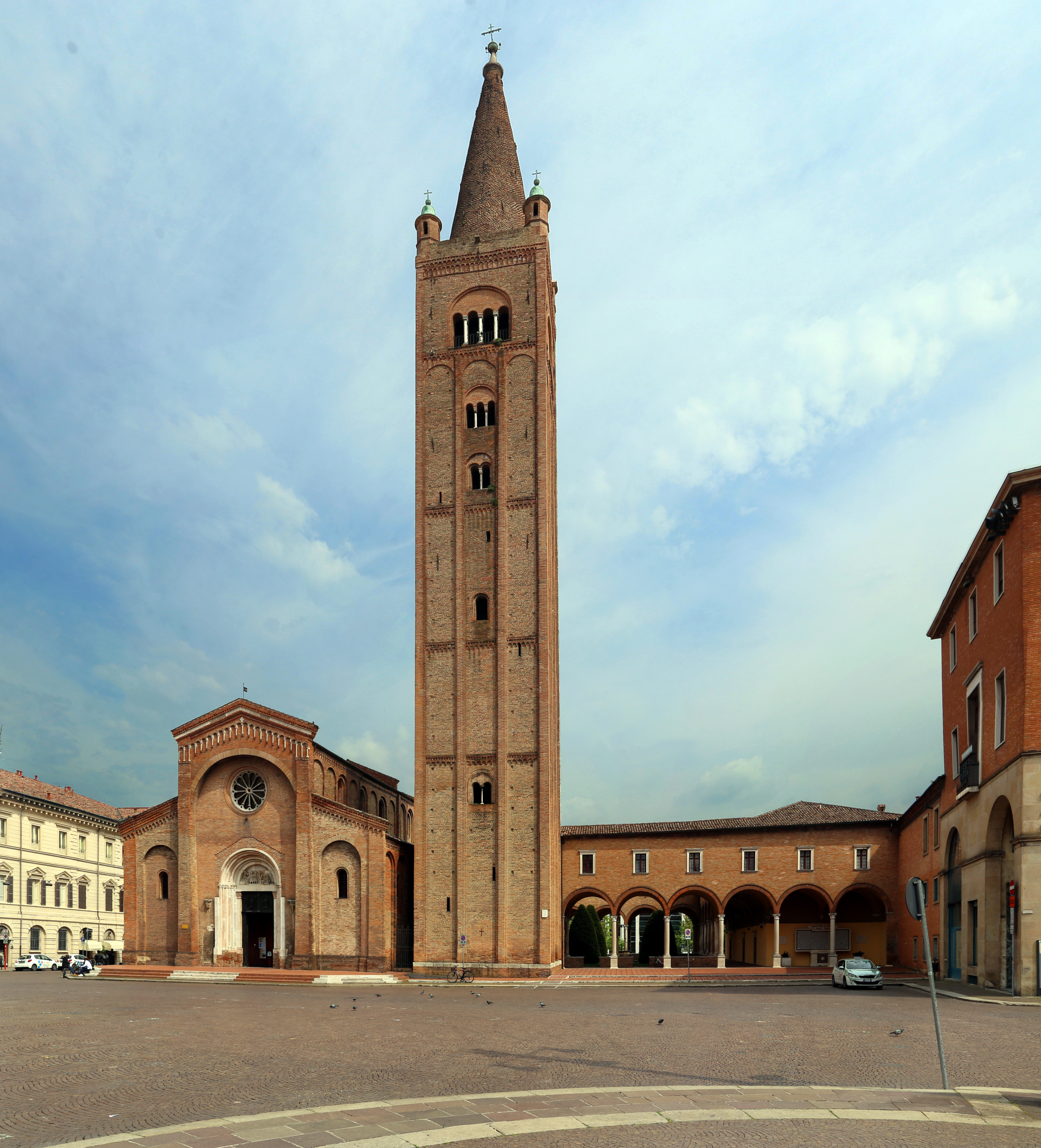
San Mercuriale, Forlì

=== Forlì ===
- Santa Maria (1977)
- San Mercuriale (1959)

=== Forlimpopoli ===
- San Rufillo (1999)

== Fossano ==
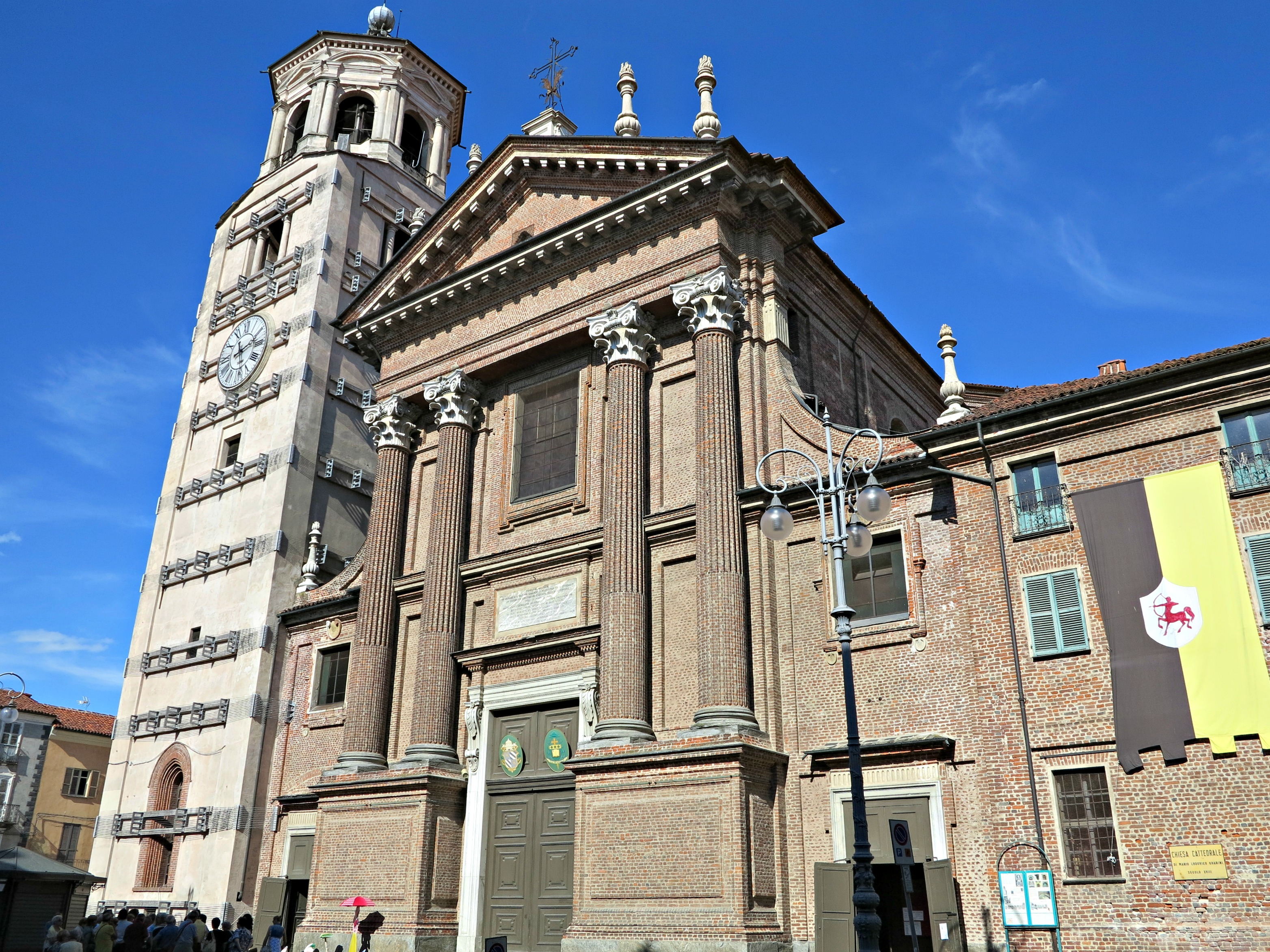
Santa Maria e San Giovenale, Fossano

=== Fossano ===
- Cathedral of Santa Maria e San Giovenale (ancient)

== Frascati ==
=== Frascati ===
- Cathedral of San Pietro Apostolo (1975)

== Frosinone – Veroli – Ferentino ==
=== Veroli ===
- Santi Giovanni e Paolo di Casamari (1957)

== Gaeta ==
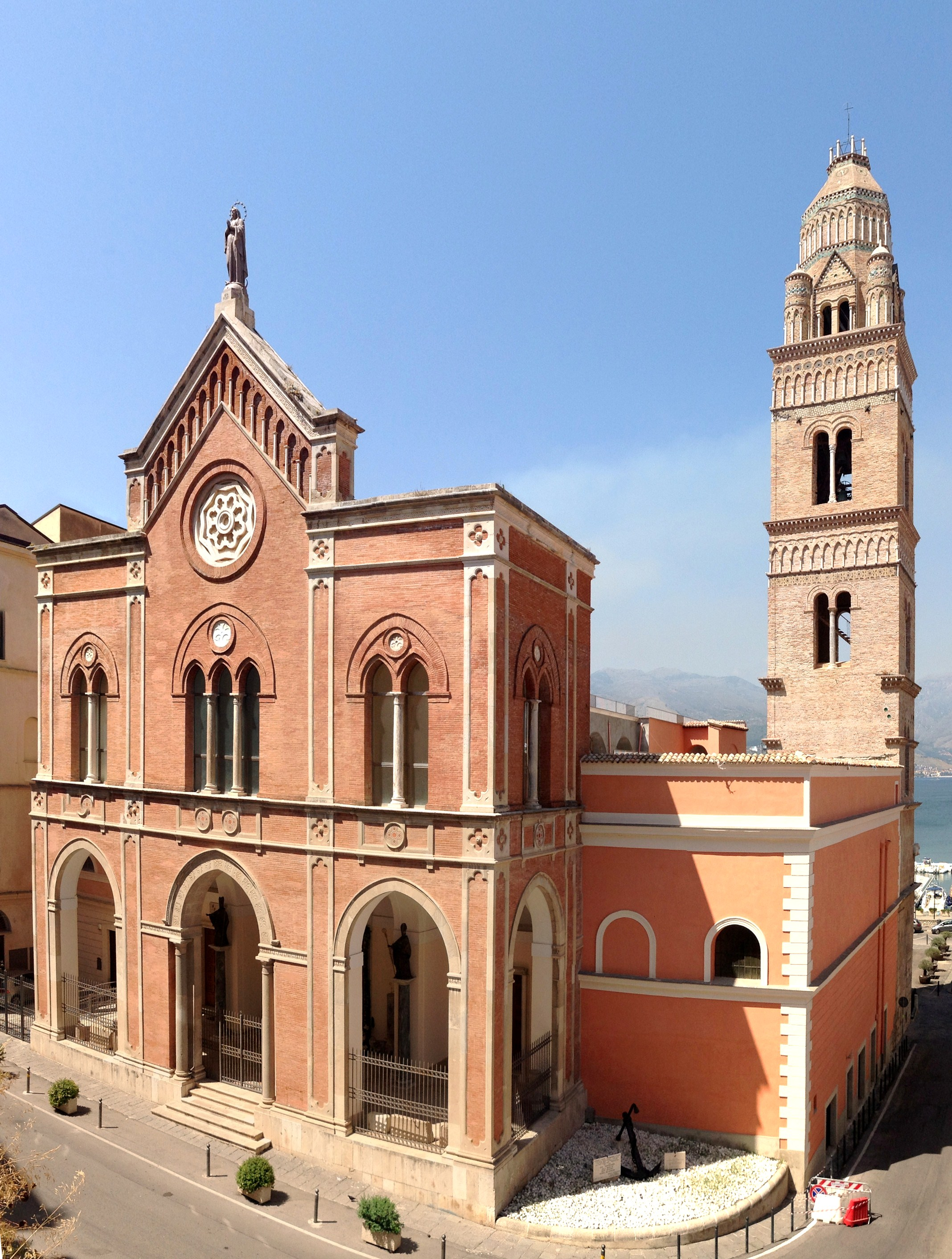
Santa Maria Assunta, Gaeta

=== Gaeta ===
- Cathedral of Santa Maria Assunta (1848)

=== Lenola ===
- Basilica Santuario della Madonna del Colle (2015)

== Genoa ==
Bambino Gesù di Praga, Arenzano

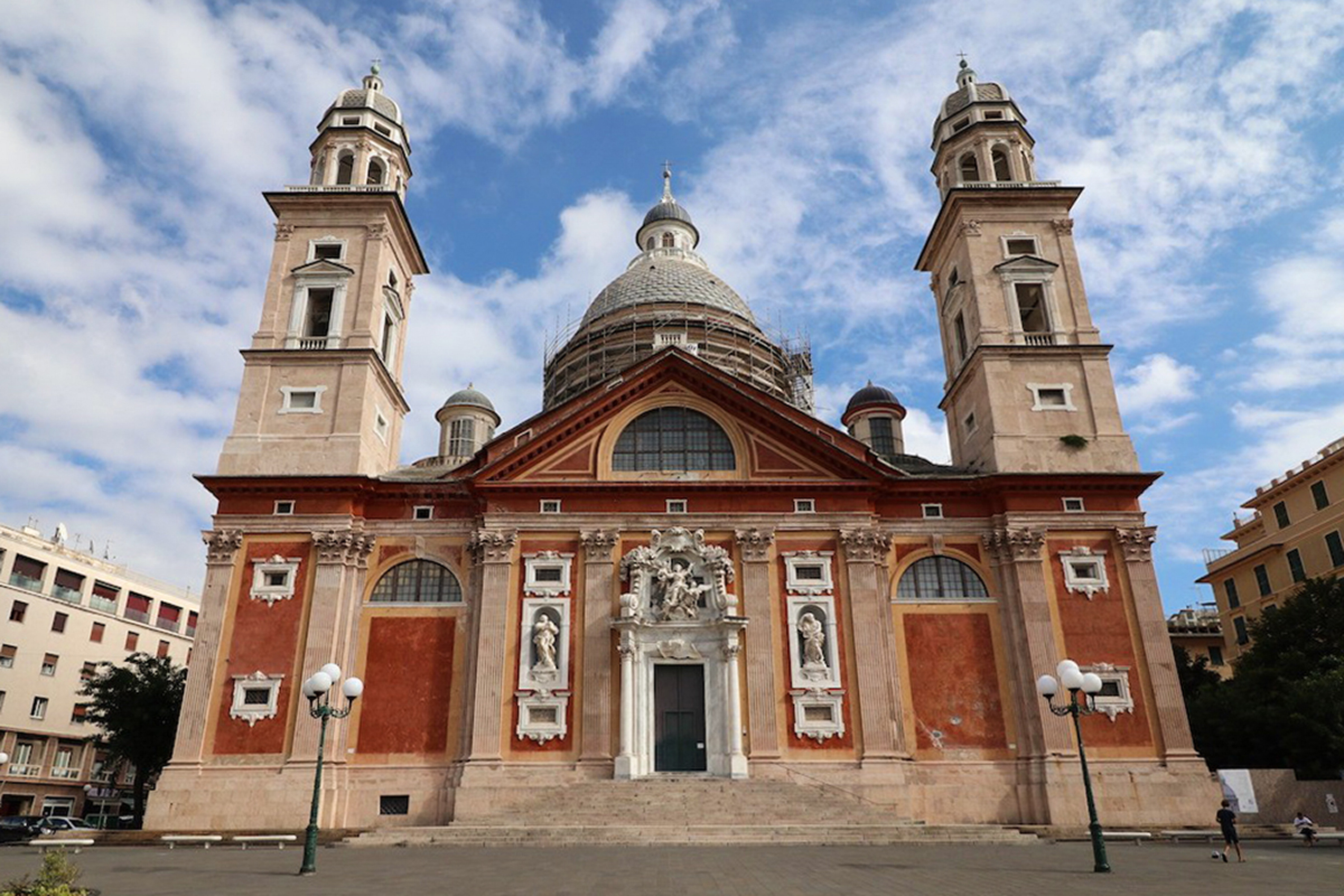
Santa Maria Assunta, Genoa

=== Arenzano ===
- Bambino Gesù di Praga (1928)

=== Camogli ===
- Santa Maria Assunta (1988)

=== Ceranesi ===
- Nostra Signora della Guardia sul Monte Figogna (1915)

=== Genoa ===
- San Francesco di Paola (1930)
- Santa Maria Assunta di Carignano (1951)
- Santa Maria Immacolata (1905)
- Santa Maria del Monte (1946)
- Santa Maria delle Vigne (1983)
- Nostra Signora Assunta (1951)

== Gorizia ==
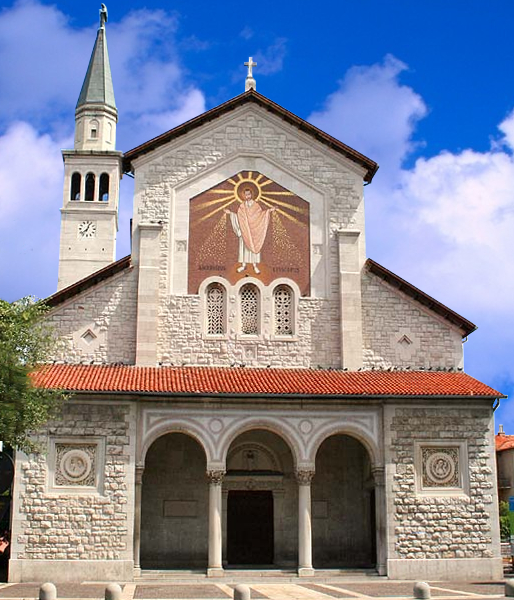
Sant'Ambrogio, Monfalcone

=== Aquileia ===
- Santa Maria Assunta in Cielo (ancient)

=== Grado ===
- Santi Ermagora e Fortunato (ancient)
- Sant'Eufemia

=== Monfalcone ===
- Sant'Ambrogio (1940)

== Grosseto ==
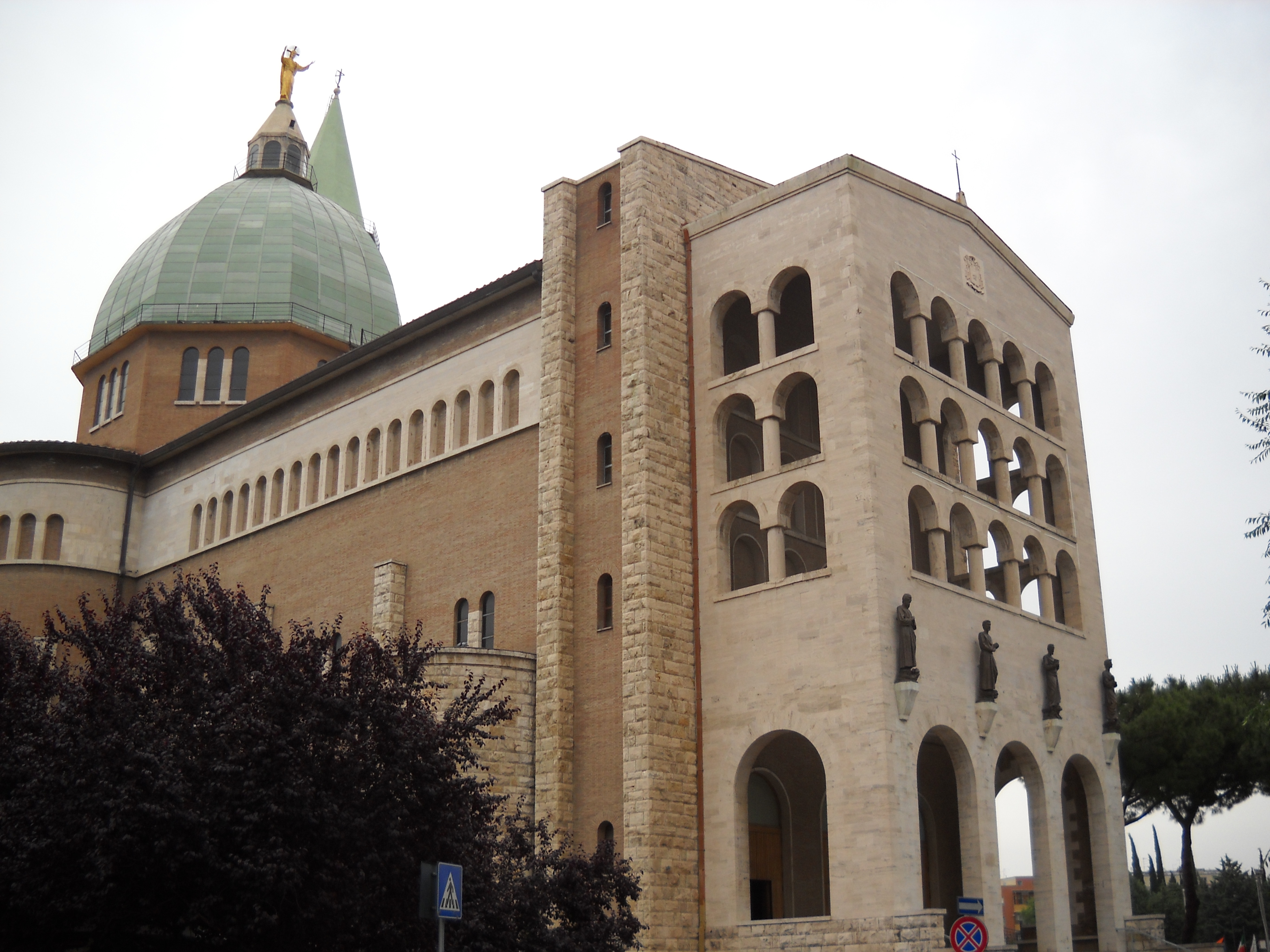
Sacro Cuore di Gesù, Grosseto

=== Grosseto ===
- Sacro Cuore di Gesù (1958)

== Gubbio ==
=== Gubbio ===
- Sant'Ubaldo (1919)

== Iglesias ==
=== Sant'Antioco ===
- Sant'Antioco Martire (1991)

== Imola ==
=== Imola ===
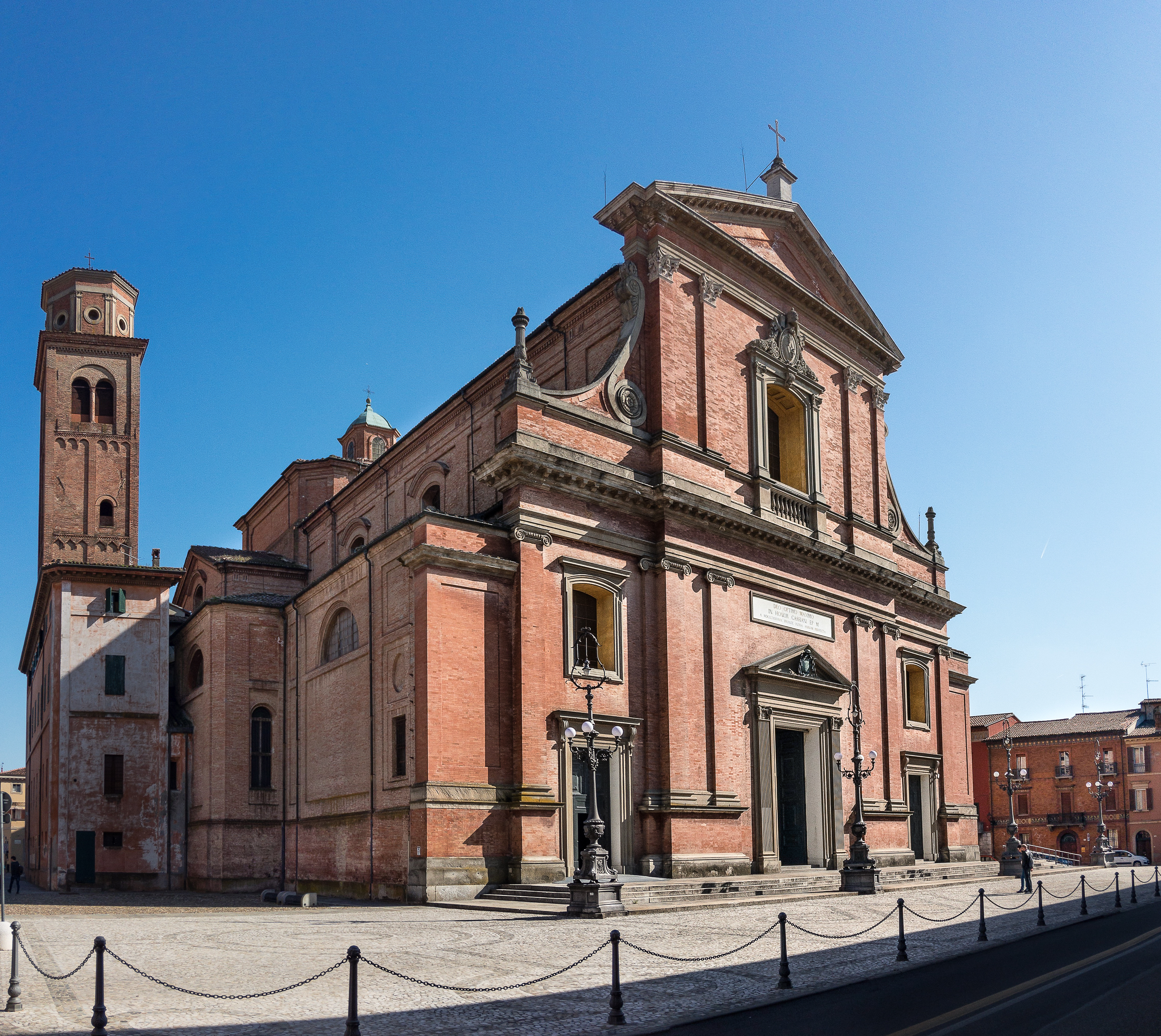
San Cassiano Martire, Imola

- Cathedral of San Cassiano Martire (1981)
- Santa Maria del Piratello (1954)

=== Lugo ===
- Madonna del Molino (1951)

== Ischia ==
=== Casamicciola Terme ===
- Sacro Cuore e Santa Maria Maddalena (1965)

=== Forio ===
- Beata Vergine Maria Incoronata (1989)
- San Vito (1988)

=== Lacco Ameno ===
- Santa Restituta (2001)

== Jesi ==
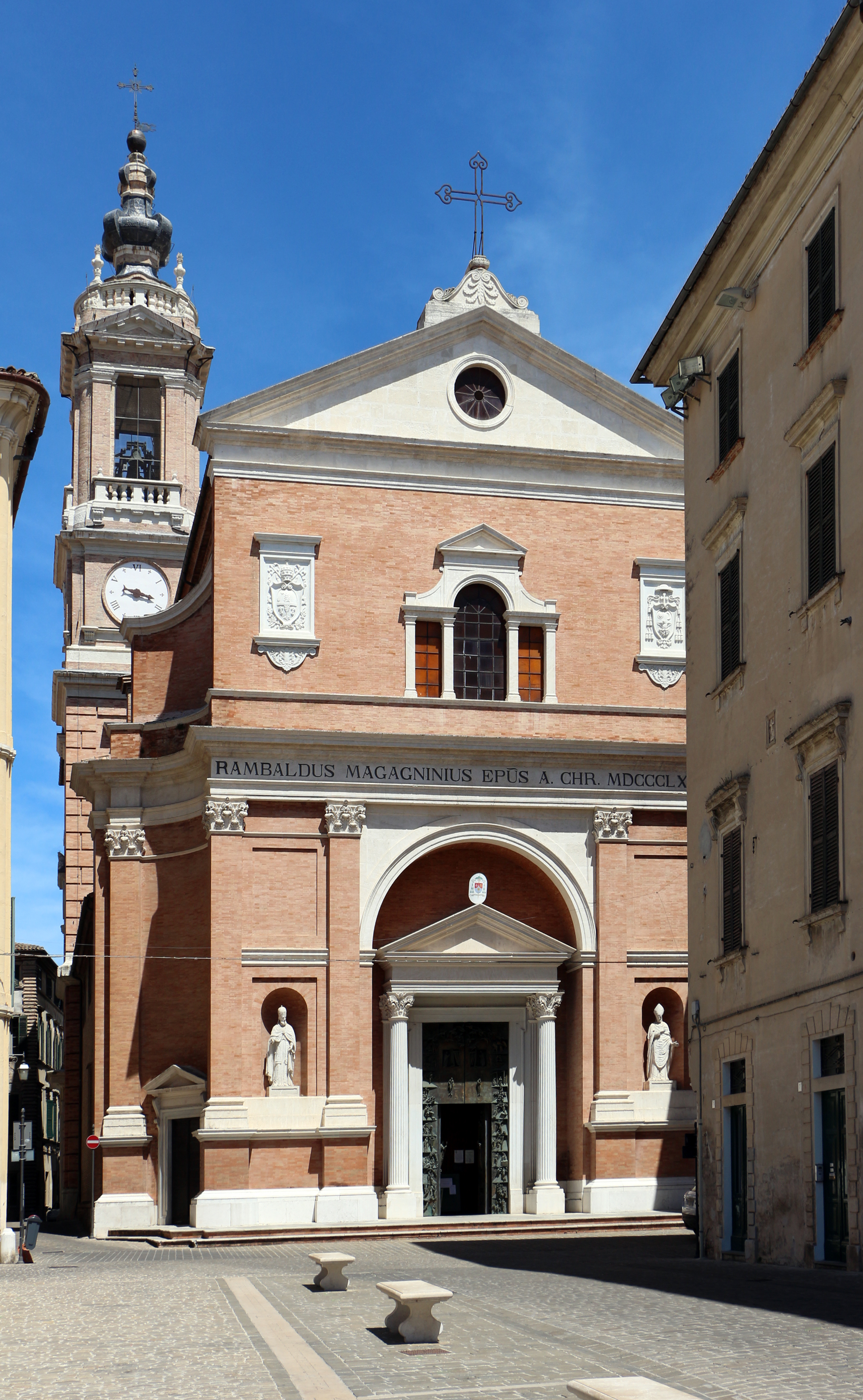
San Settimio, Jesi

=== Jesi ===
- Cathedral of San Settimio (1969)

== Lamezia – Terme ==
=== Conflenti ===
- Basilica Santuario Maria Santissima della Quercia di Visora (2018)

== Lanciano – Ortona ==
=== Lanciano ===
- Cathedral of Madonna del Ponte (1909)

=== Ortona ===
- Co-Cathedral of San Tommaso Apostolo (1859)

== L'Aquila ==
=== L'Aquila ===
- San Bernardino (1946)

== La Spezia – Sarzana – Brugnato ==
=== Sarzana ===
- Co-Cathedral of Santa Maria Assunta (1947)

== Lecce ==
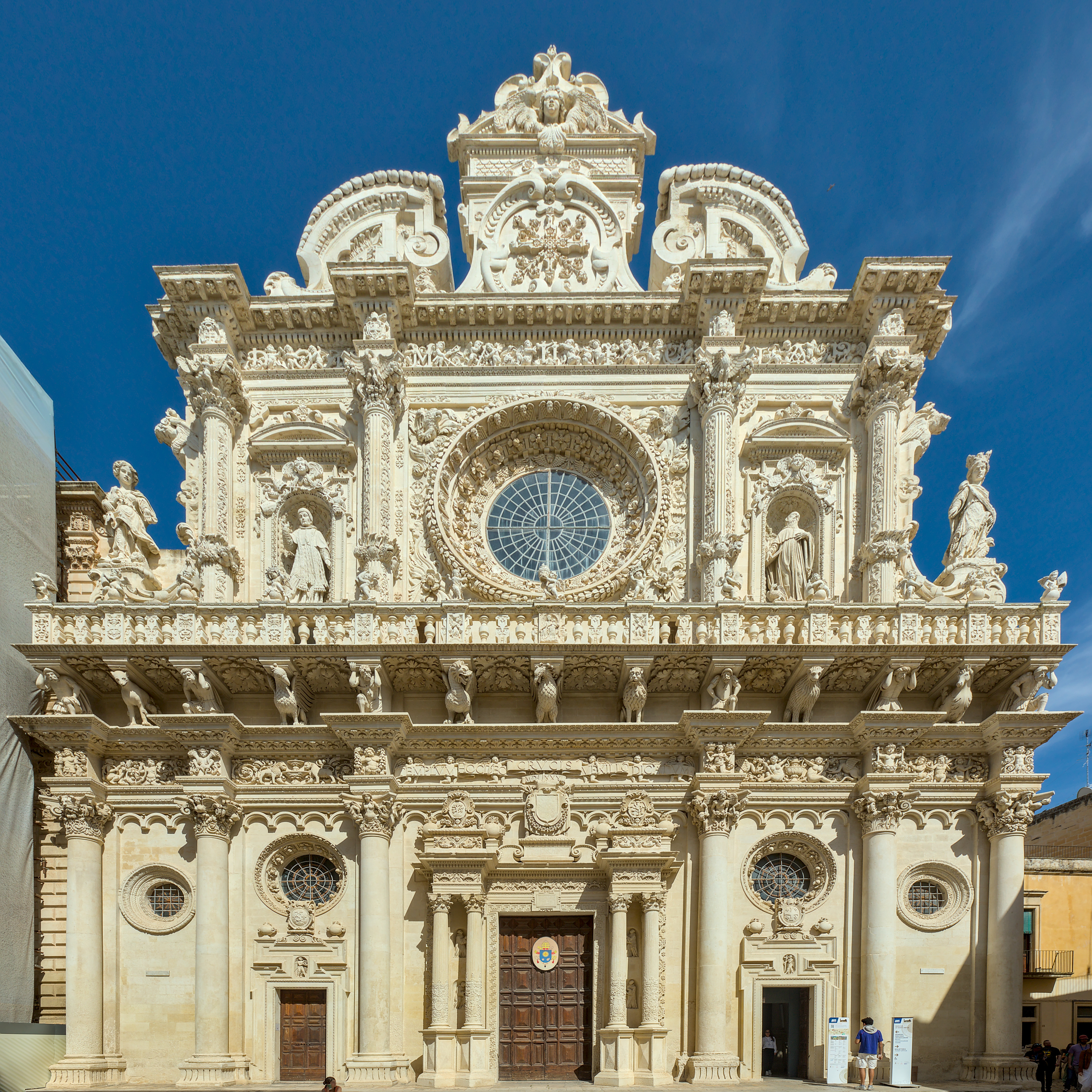
Santa Croce, Lecce

=== Lecce ===
- Santa Croce (1905)
- San Domenico Savio (1984)
- San Giovanni Battista al Rosario (1948)

== Livorno ==
=== Livorno ===
- Madonna delle Grazie di Montenero (1818)

== Locri – Gerace ==
=== Gerace ===
- Basilica Concattedrale di S. Maria Assunta (2018)

== Lodi ==
=== Lodi ===
- Cathedral of San Bassiano (1970)

=== Sant'Angelo Lodigiano ===
- Santa Francesca Saverio Cabrini (1950)

== Loreto ==
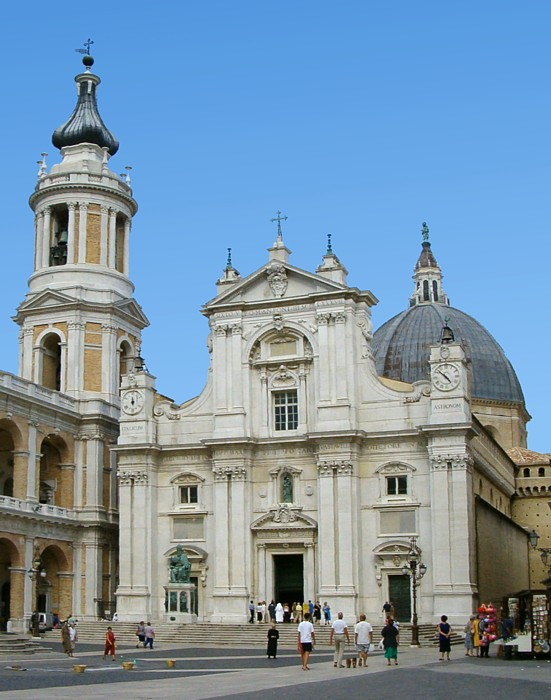
Basilica della Santa Casa, Loreto

=== Loreto ===
- Basilica della Santa Casa (ancient)

== Lucca ==
=== Lucca ===
- San Frediano (1957)
- Santi Paolino e Donato (ancient)

== Lucera – Troia ==
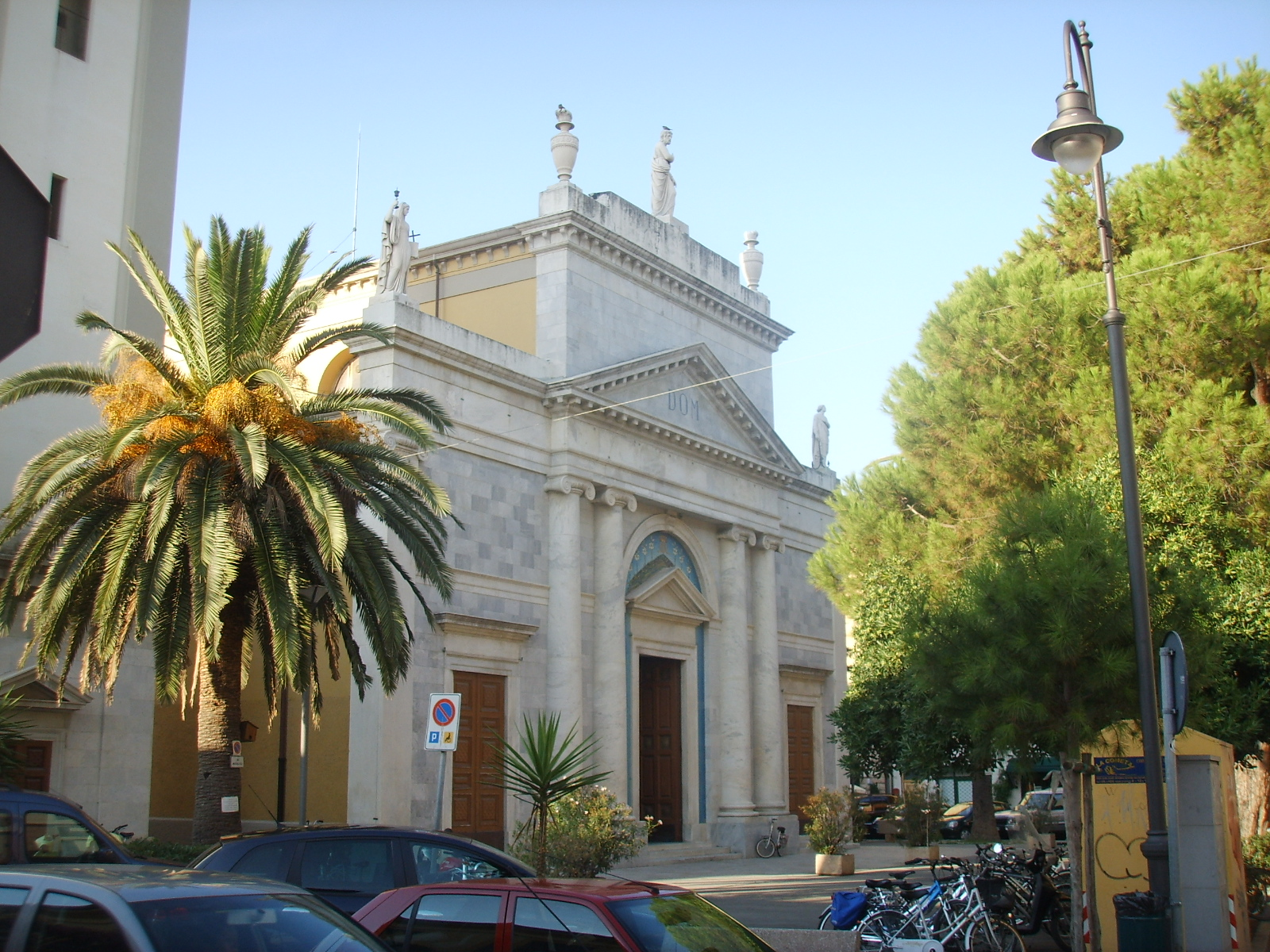
Sant'Andrea, Viareggio

=== Lucera ===
- Cathedral of Maria Santissima Assunta in Cielo (1834)

=== Troia ===
- Co-Cathedral of Santa Maria Assunta (1958)

=== Viareggio ===
- Sant'Andrea (1963)
- San Paolino (1958)

== Macerata – Tolentino – Recanati – Cingoli – Treia ==
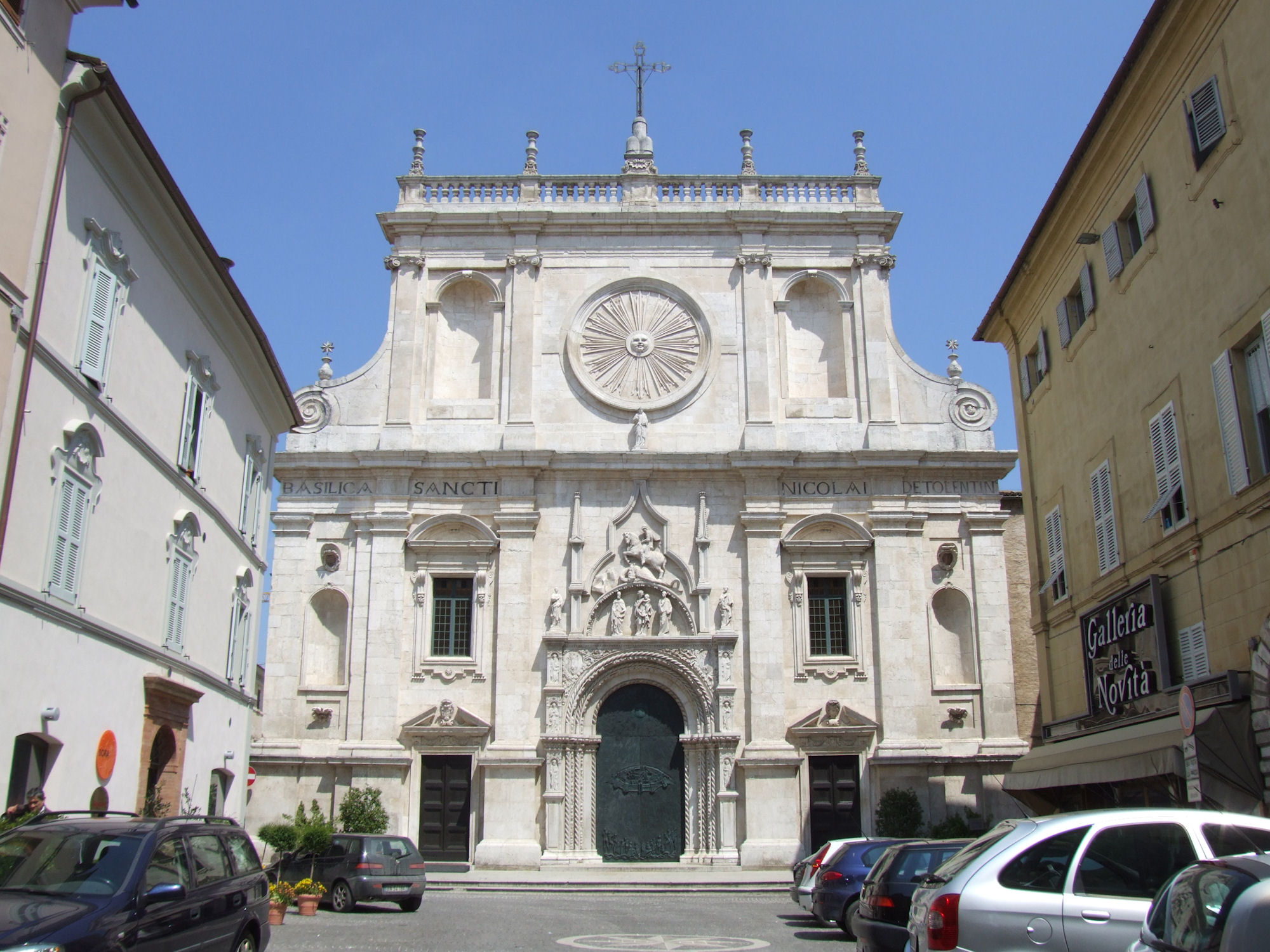
San Nicola Pro-Cathedral, Tolentino

=== Macerata ===
- Madonna della Misericordia (1921)

=== Recanati ===
- Co-Cathedral of San Flaviano (1804)

=== Tolentino ===
- Co-Cathedral of San Catervo (1961)
- Pro-Cathedral of San Nicola di Tolentino (1783)

== Manfredonia – Vieste – San Giovanni Rotondo ==
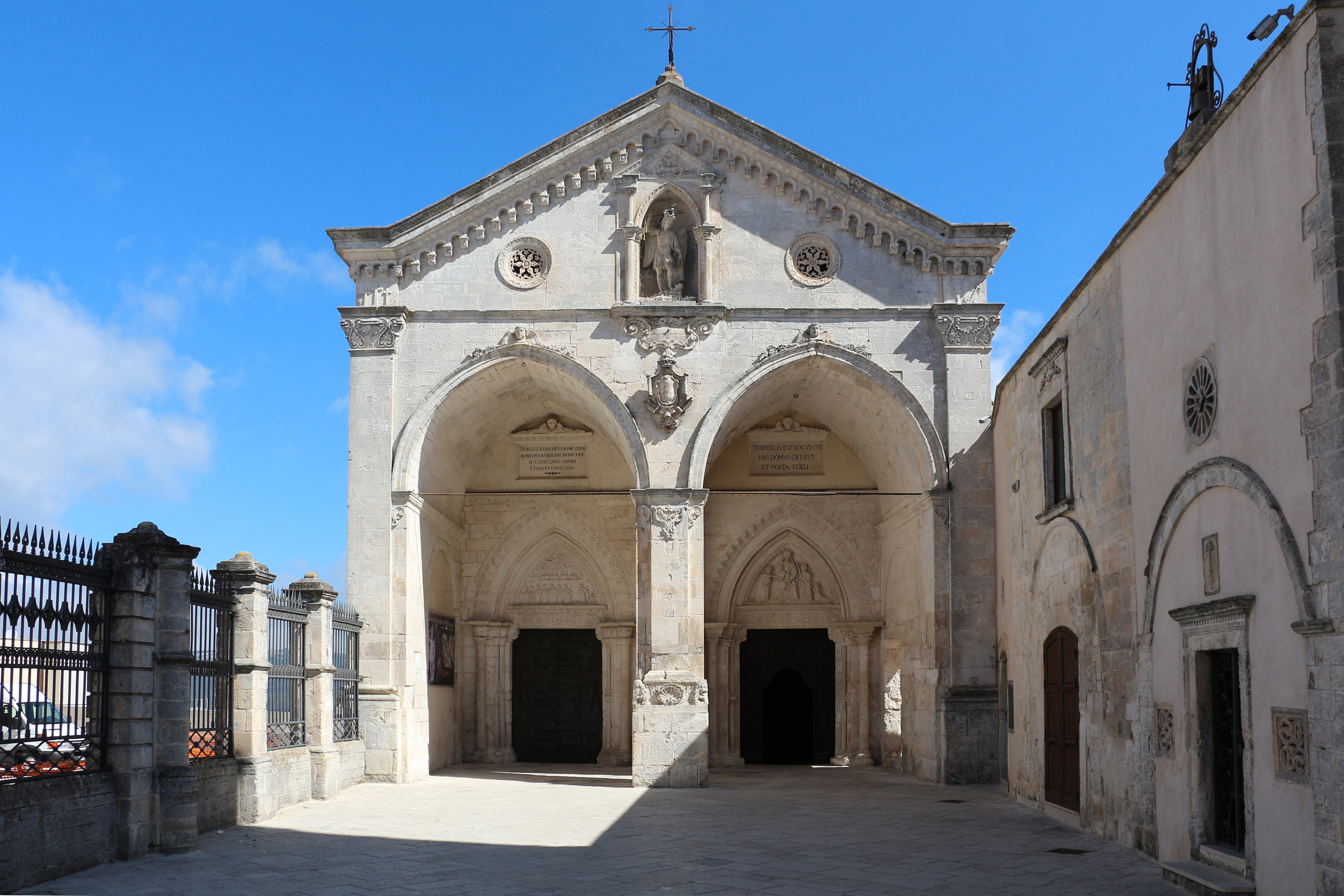
San Michele Arcangelo, Monte Sant'Angelo

=== Manfredonia ===
- Santa Maria Maggiore di Siponto (1977)

=== Monte Sant'Angelo ===
- San Michele Arcangelo (ancient)

=== Vieste ===
- Co-Cathedral of Maria Santissima Assunta in cielo (1981)

== Mantua ==
=== Castiglione delle Stiviere ===
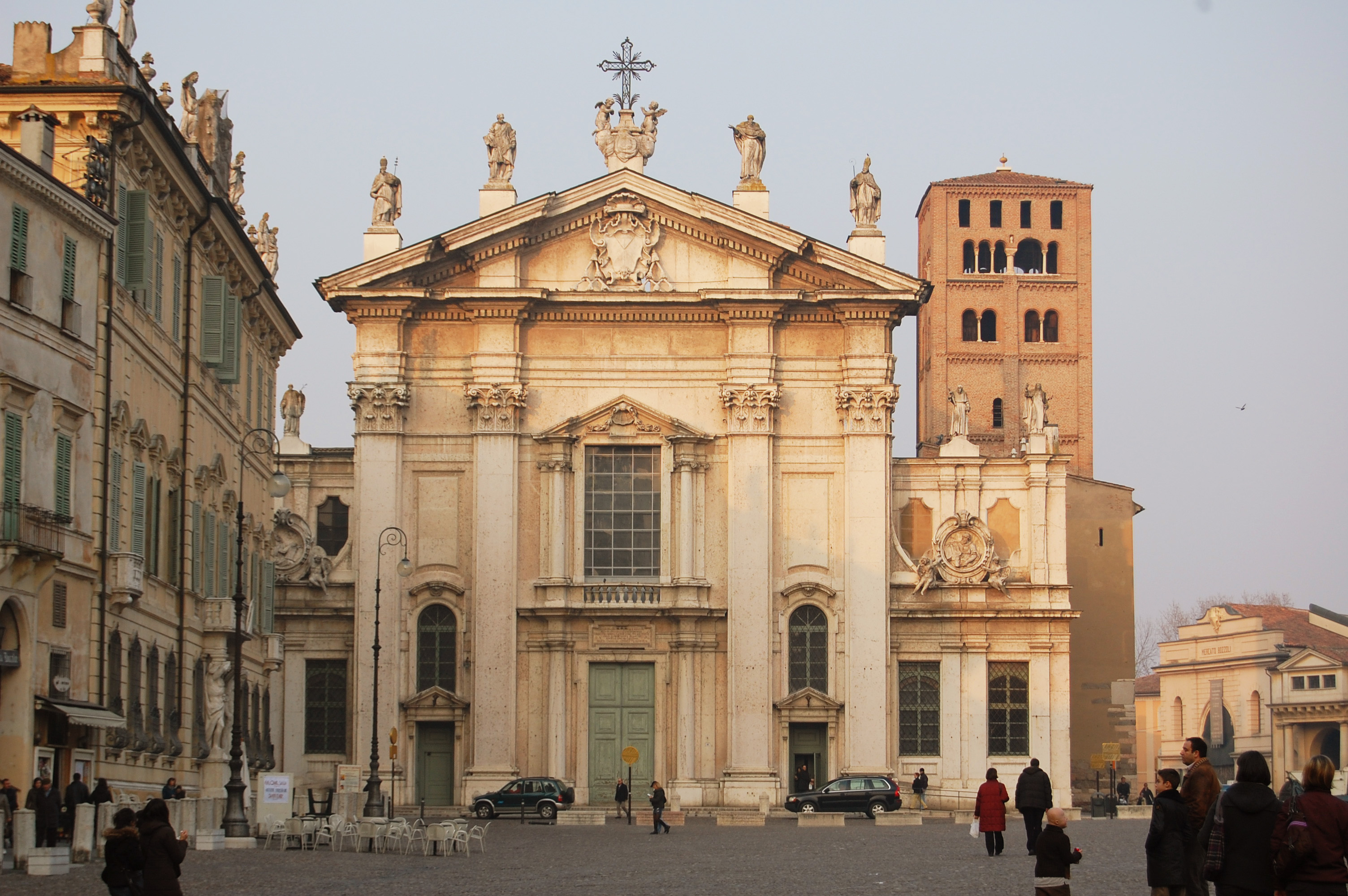
Sant'Andrea, Mantua

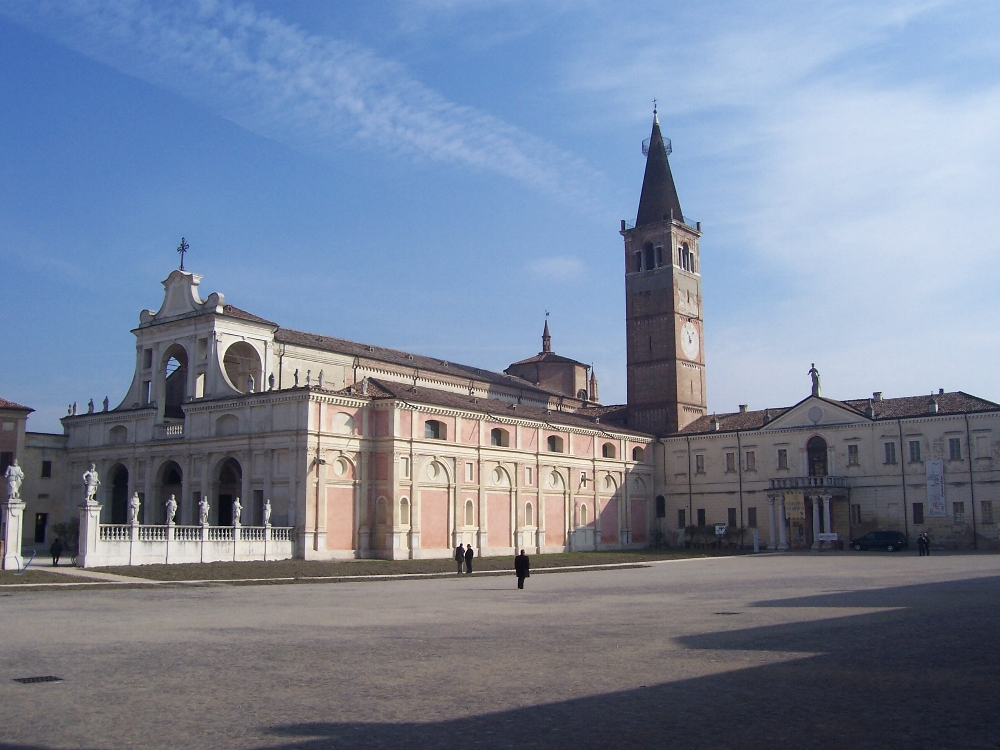
San Benedetto in Polirone, San Benedetto Po

- San Luigi Gonzaga (1964)

=== Curtatone ===
- Santa Maria delle Grazie (ancient)

=== Goito ===
- Madonna della Salute (1946)

=== Gonzaga ===
- San Benedetto Abate (2020)

=== Mantua ===
- Santa Barbara (ancient)
- Co-Cathedral of Sant'Andrea (ancient)

=== San Benedetto Po ===
- San Benedetto in Polirone (ancient)

== Massa Carrara – Pontremoli ==
=== Massa ===
- Cathedral of Santi Pietro Apostolo e Francesco d'Assisi (1964)

== Massa Marittima – Piombino ==
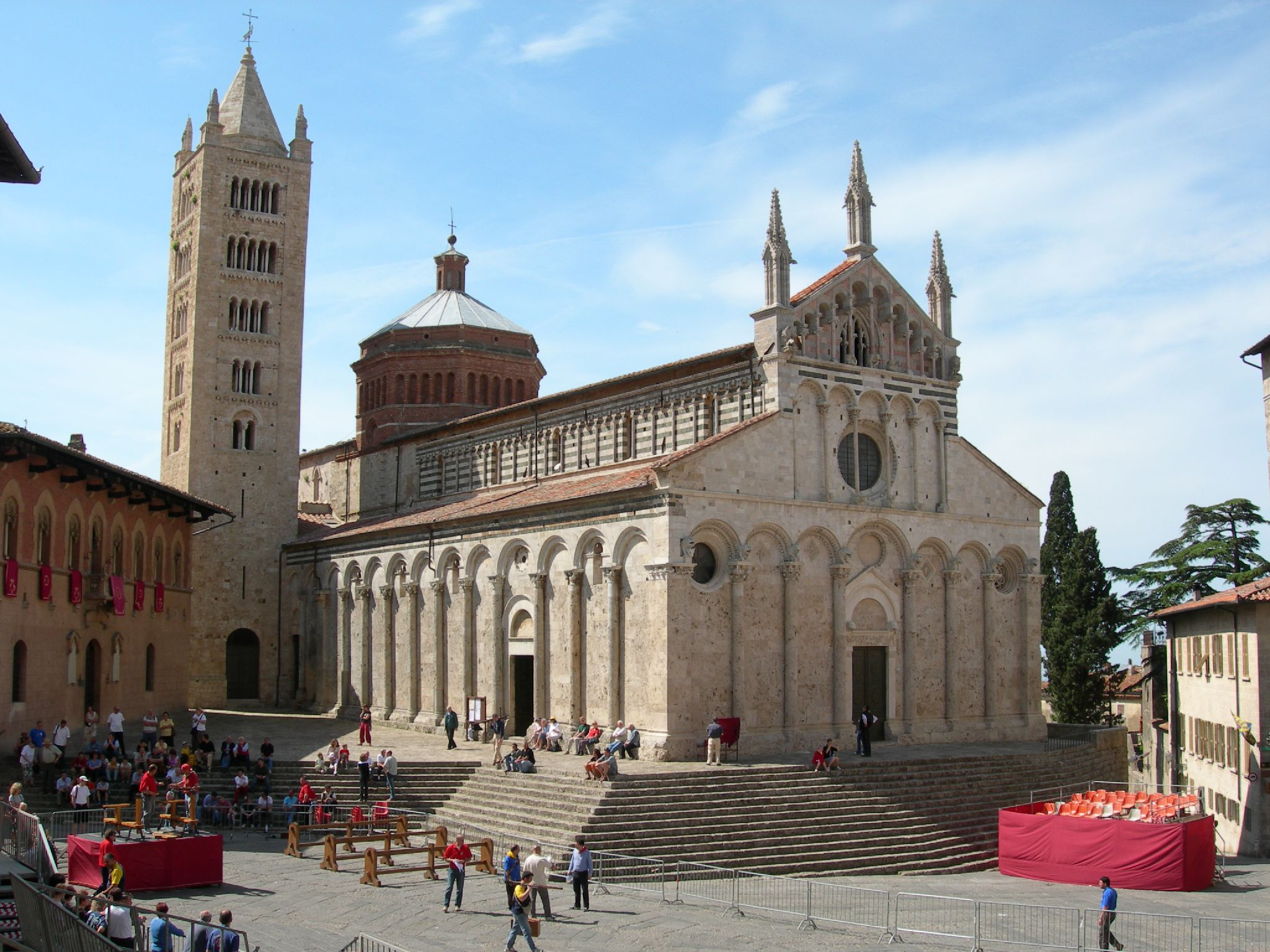
Cerbone Vescovo, Massa Marittima

=== Massa Marittima ===
- Cathedral of Cerbone Vescovo (1975)

== Matera – Irsina ==
=== Matera ===
- Cathedral of San Eustachio (1962)

== Mazara del Vallo ==
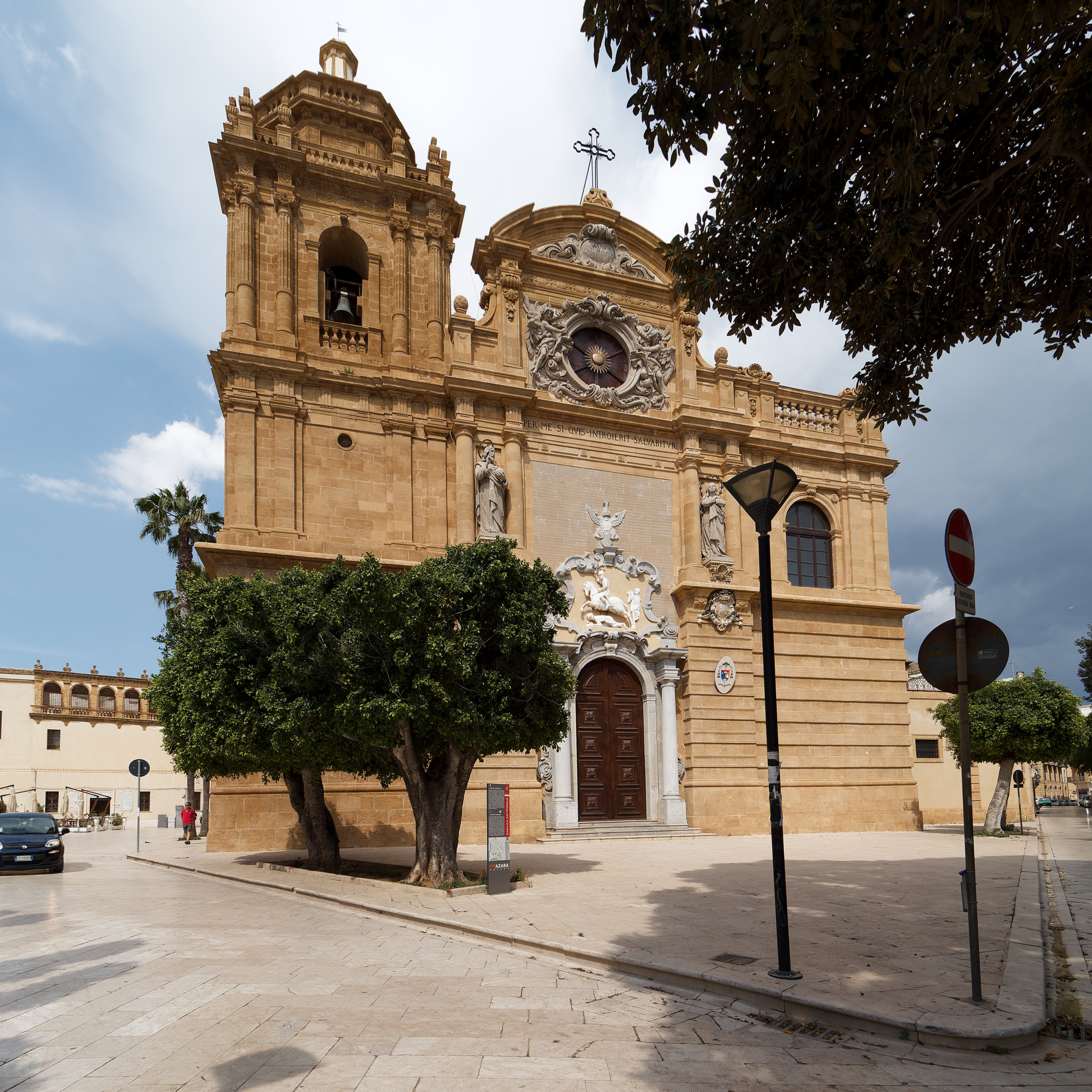
Santissima Salvatore, Mazara del Vallo

=== Mazara del Vallo ===
- Cathedral of Santissima Salvatore (1980)

== Melfi – Rapolla – Venosa ==
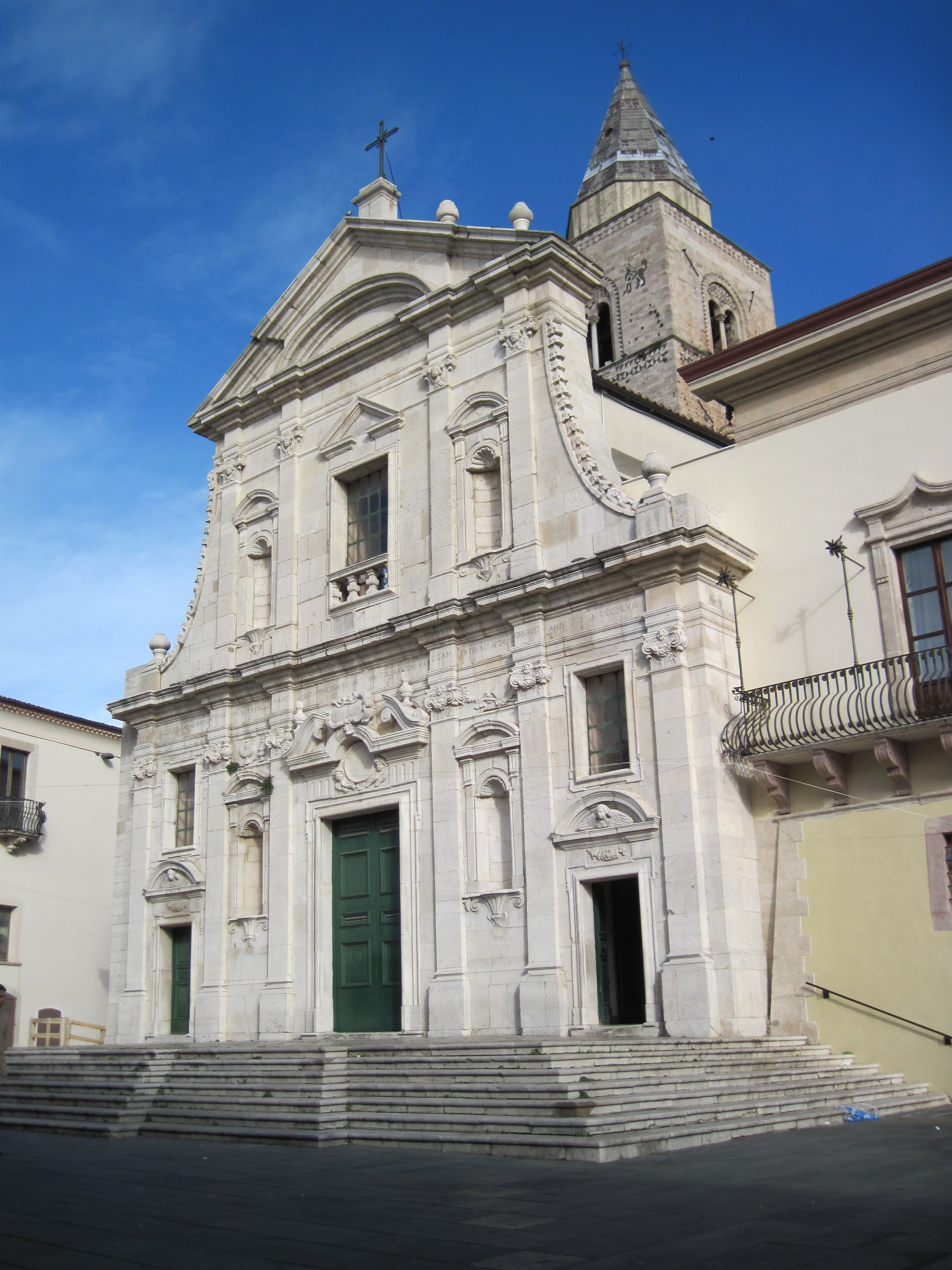
Santa Maria Assunta, Melfi

=== Melfi ===
- Cathedral of Santa Maria Assunta (1958)

== Messina – Lipari – Santa Lucia del Mela ==
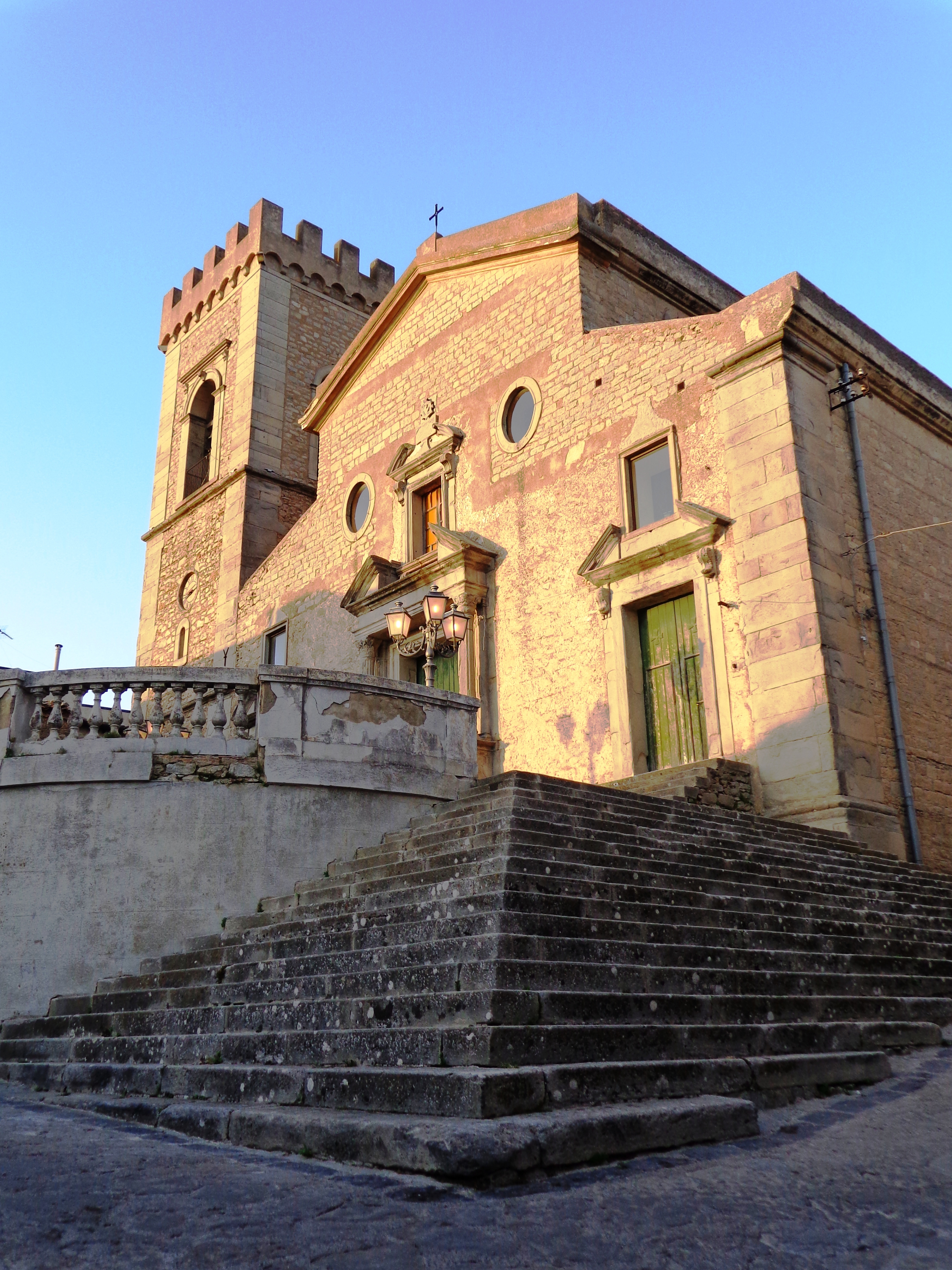
Santa Maria Assunta, Montalbano

=== Barcellona Pozzo di Gotto ===
- San Sebastiano (1936)

=== Lipari ===
- San Cristoforo di Canneto di Lipari (2004)

=== Messina ===
- Cathedral of Santa Maria Assunta (1947)

=== Montalbano Elicona ===
- Santa Maria Assunta (1997)

=== Taormina ===
- San Nicolò di Bari (1980)

== Milan ==
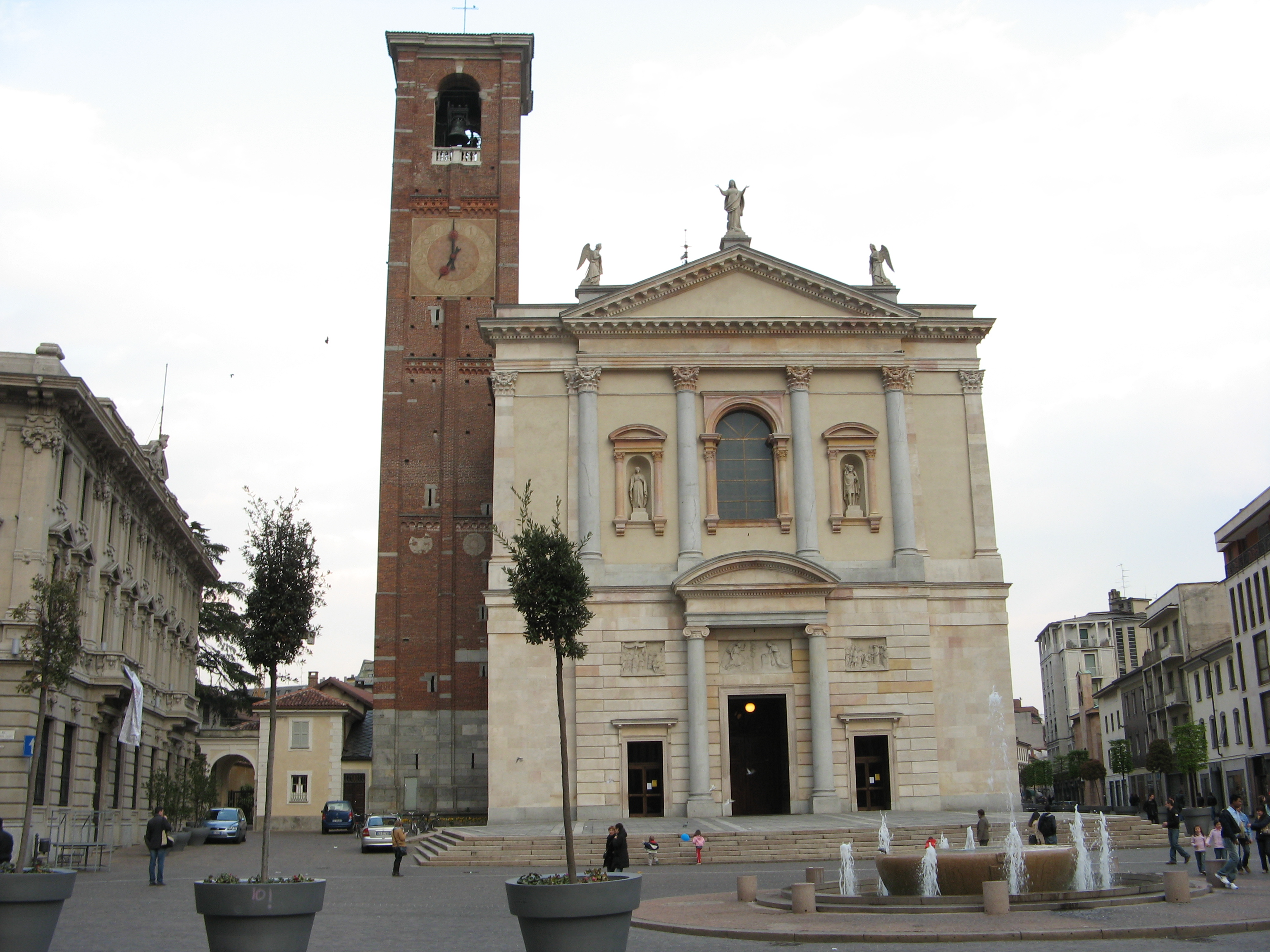
Santa Maria Assunta, Gallarate

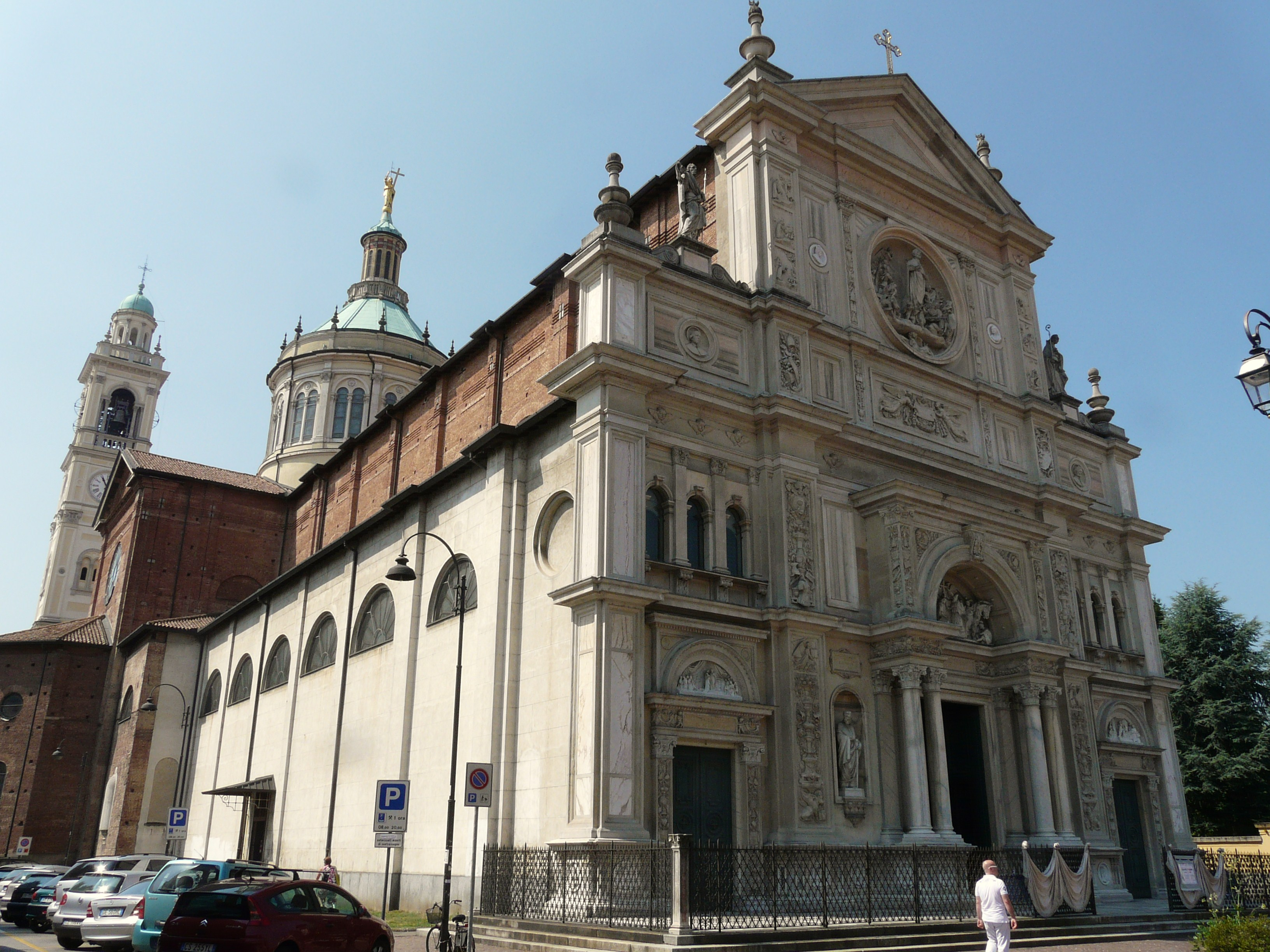
San Martino, Magenta

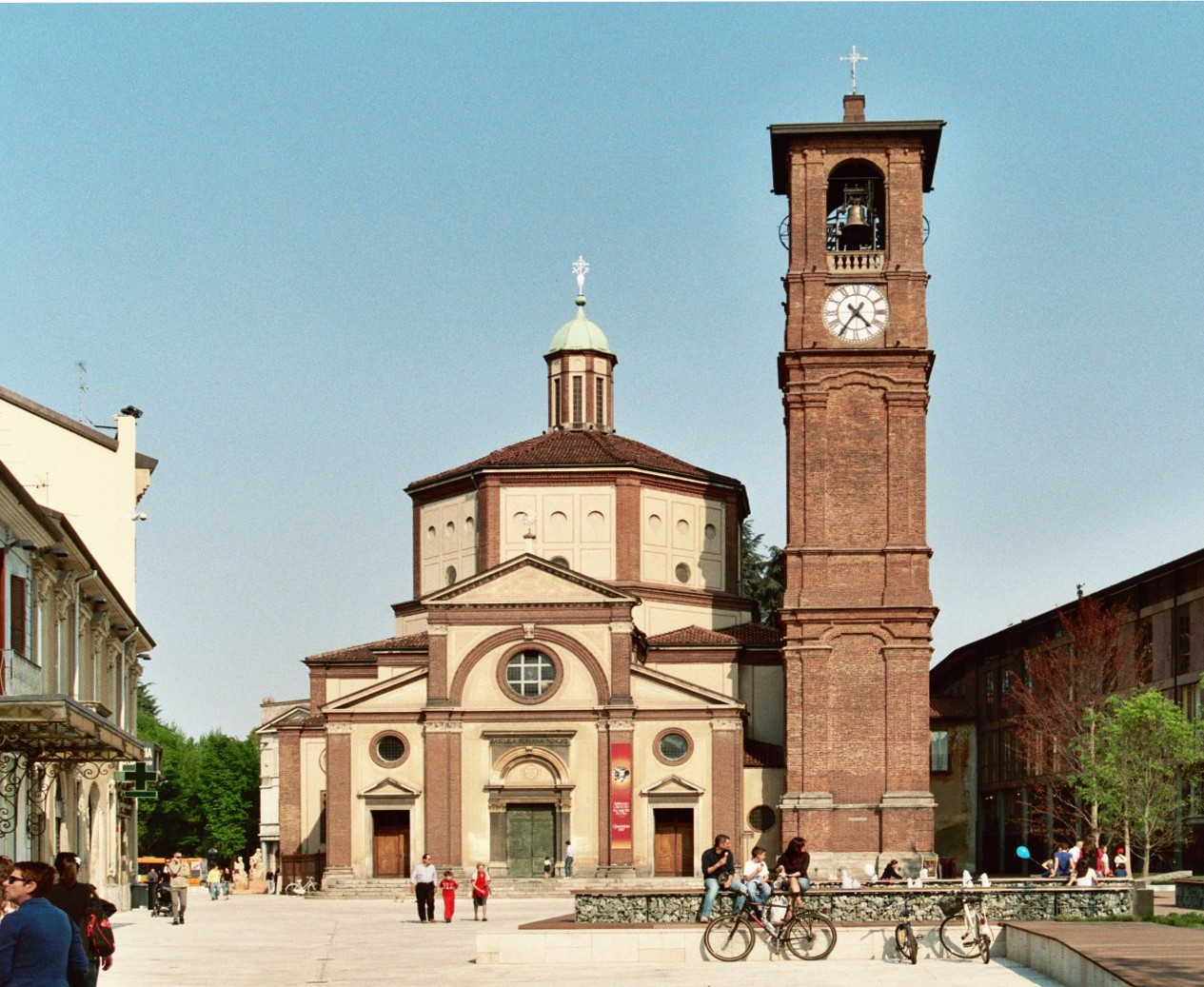
San Magno, Legnano

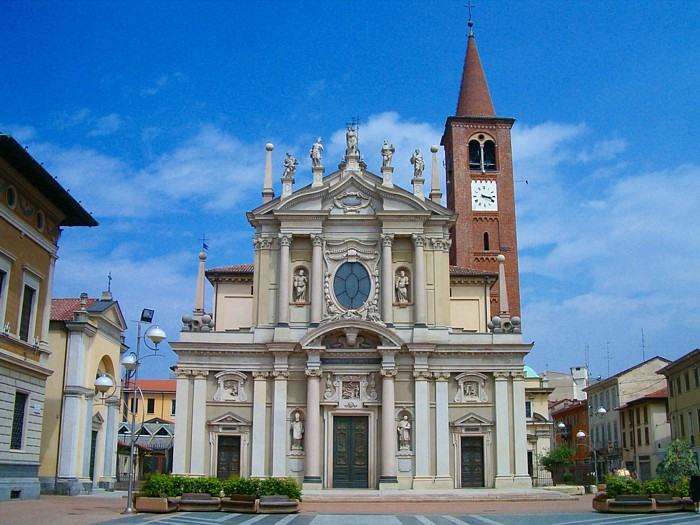
San Giovanni Battista, Busto Arsizio

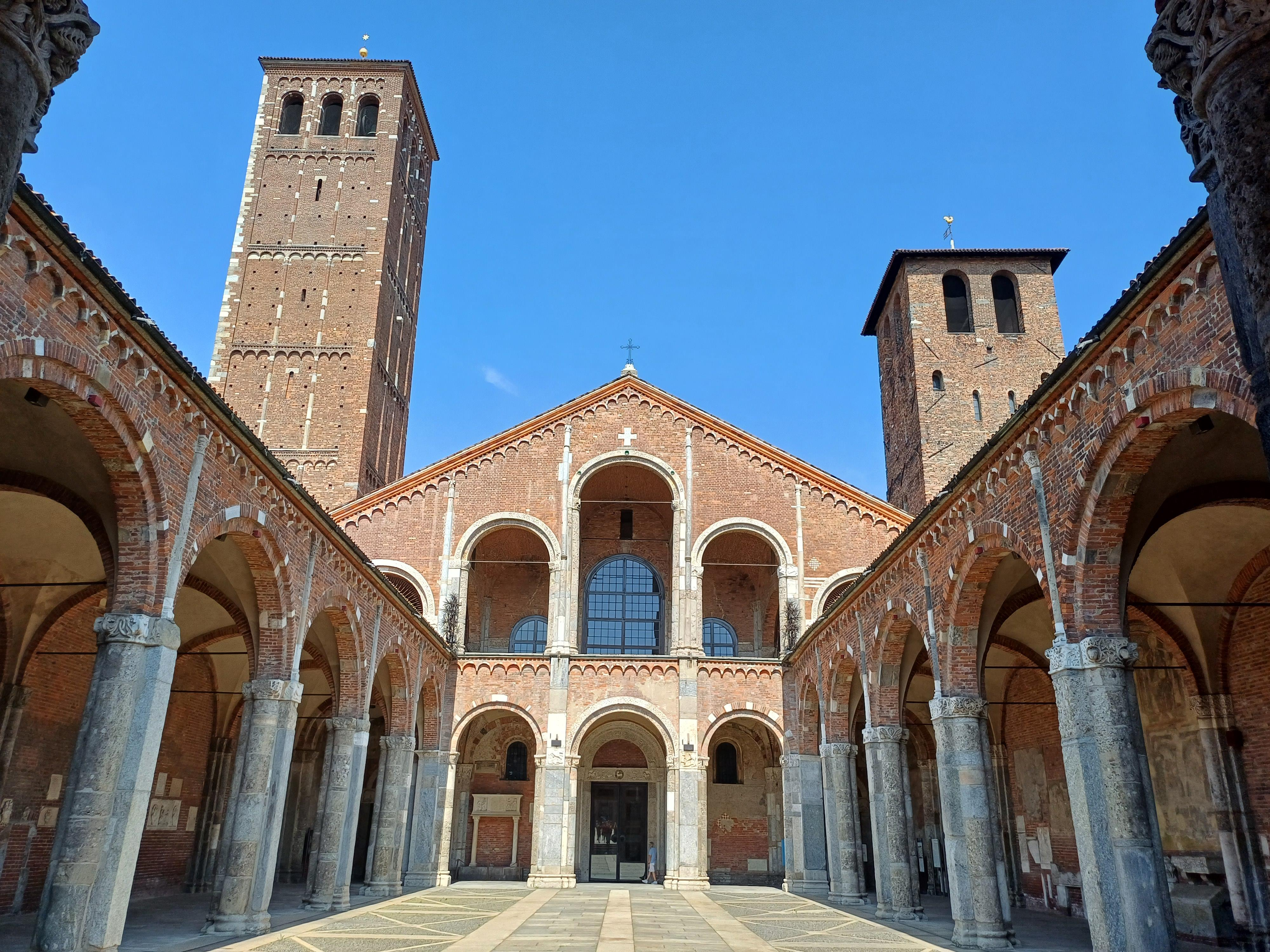
Sant'Ambrogio, Milan

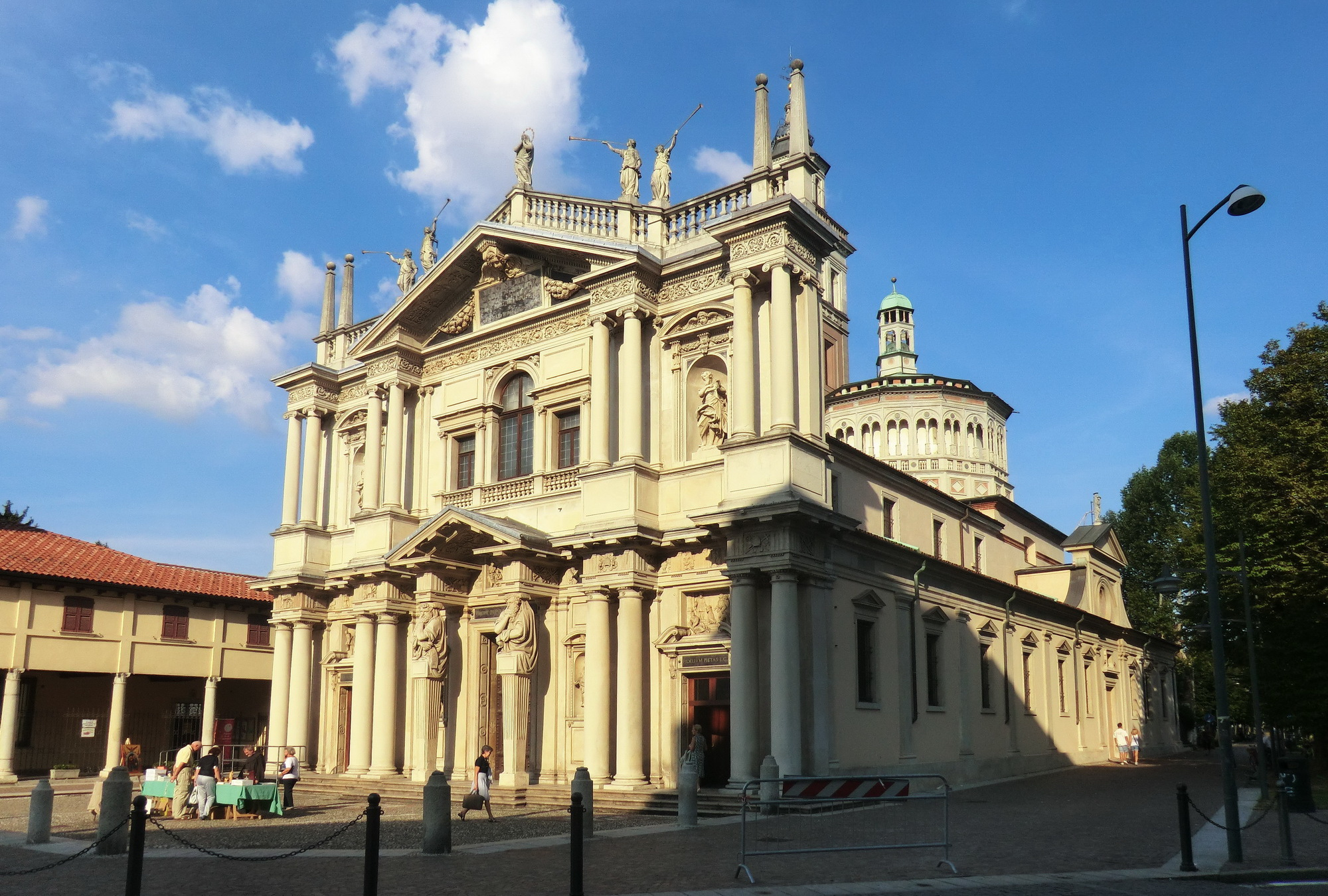
Santa Maria dei Miracoli, Saronno

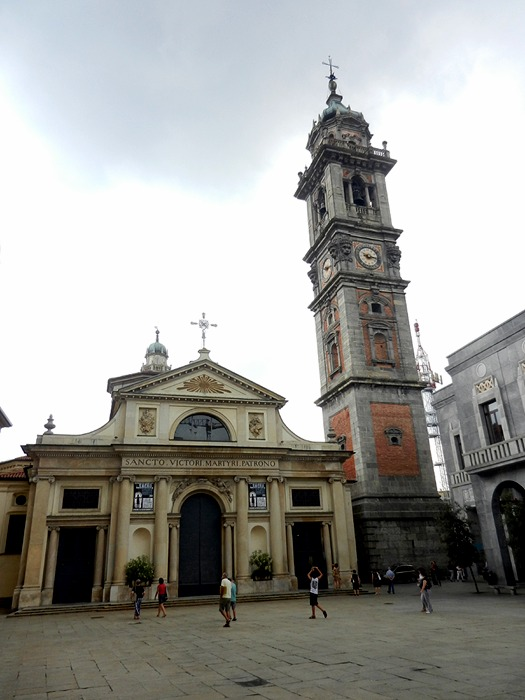
San Vittore, Varese

=== Abbiategrasso ===
- Santa Maria Nuova (1962)

=== Besana in Brianza ===
- Santi Pietro, Marcellino ed Erasmo (1998)

=== Busto Arsizio ===
- San Giovanni Battista (1948)

=== Cantù ===
- San Paolo (1950)

=== Desio ===
- Santi Siro e Materno (1936)

=== Gallarate ===
- Santa Maria Assunta (1946)

=== Imbersago ===
- Madonna del Bosco (1958)

=== Lecco ===
- San Nicolo di Bari (1943)

=== Legnano ===
- San Magno (1950)

=== Magenta ===
- San Martino (1948)

=== Melegnano ===
- Nativita di San Giovanni Battista (1992)

=== Milan ===
- Corpus Domini (1950)
- Sant'Ambrogio (1874)
- Sant'Antonio di Padova (1937)
- San Carlo Borromeo al Corso (1938)
- San Celso (1929)
- Santa Maria di Caravaggio (1979)
- Santa Maria delle Grazie (1993)
- Santa Maria di Lourdes (1957)
- Santi Nereo e Achilleo (1990)

=== Missaglia ===
- San Vittore (1946)

=== Monza ===
- Cathedral of San Giovanni Battista (ancient)

=== Rho ===
- Santa Maria Addolorata (1923)

=== Saronno ===
- Santa Maria dei Miracoli (1923)

=== Seregno ===
- San Giuseppe (1981)

=== Sesto San Giovanni ===
- Santo Stefano (1991)

=== Somma Lombardo ===
- Sant'Agnese (2004)

=== Treviglio ===
- Santi Martino e Maria Assunta (1951)

=== Varese ===
- Basilica of San Vittore, Varese (1925)

== Mileto – Nicotera – Tropea ==
=== Mileto ===
- Basilica Cattedrale di Maria SS. Assunta in Cielo (2016)

=== Seminara ===
- Madonna dei Poveri (1955)

=== Vallelonga ===
- Madonna di Monserrato (1971)

== Modena – Nonantola ==
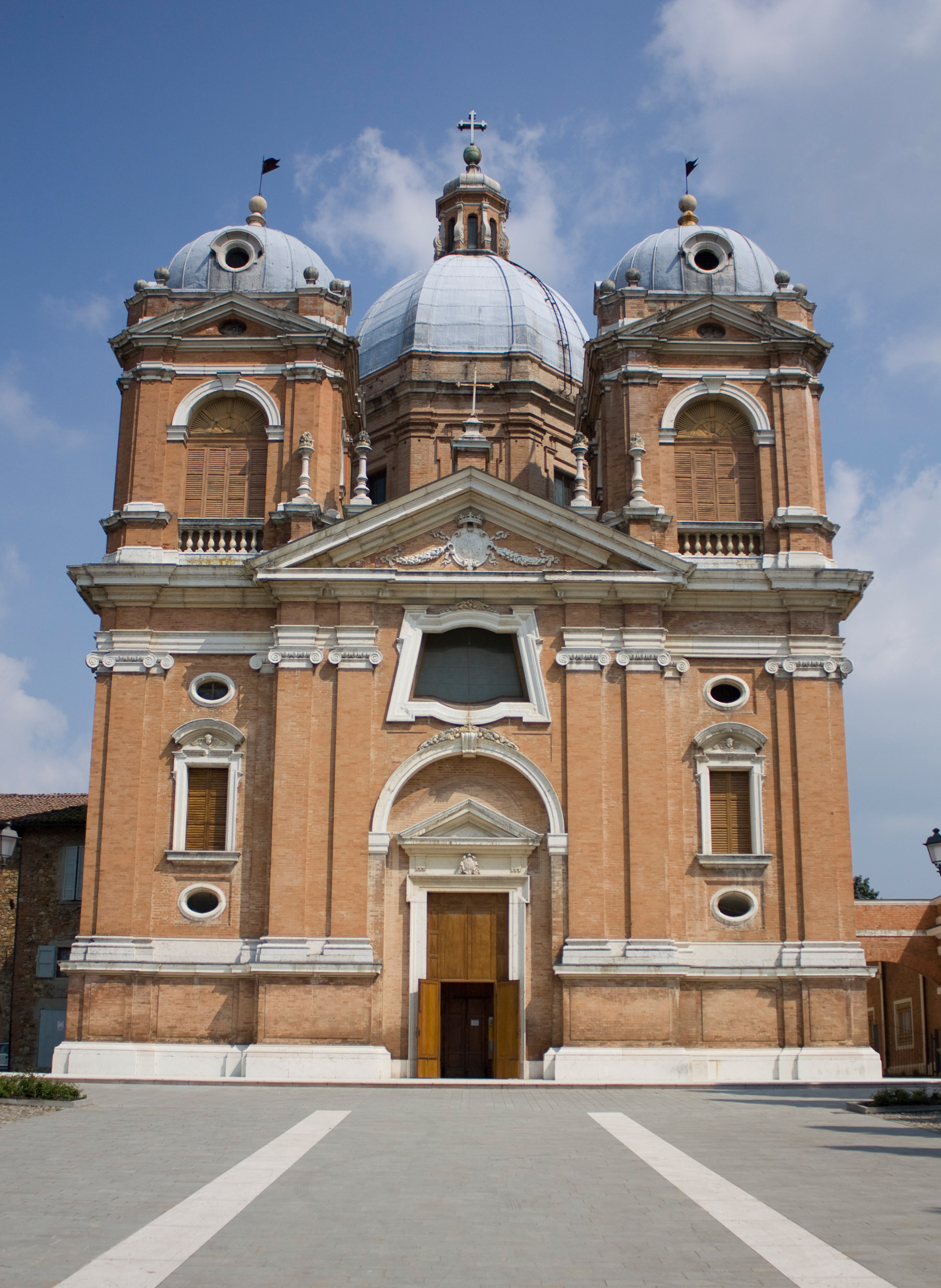
Beata Vergine del Castello, Fiorano Modenese

=== Fiorano Modenese ===
- Beata Vergine del Castello (1989)

=== Modena ===
- Cathedral of Santa Maria Assunta e San Geminiano (1934)
- San Pietro (1956)

== Molfetta – Ruvo – Giovinazzo – Terlizzi ==
=== Molfetta ===
- Madonna dei martiri (1987)

== Mondovì ==
=== Vicoforte ===
- Sanctuary of Madonna Santissima del Mondovì a Vico (1735)

== Monreale ==
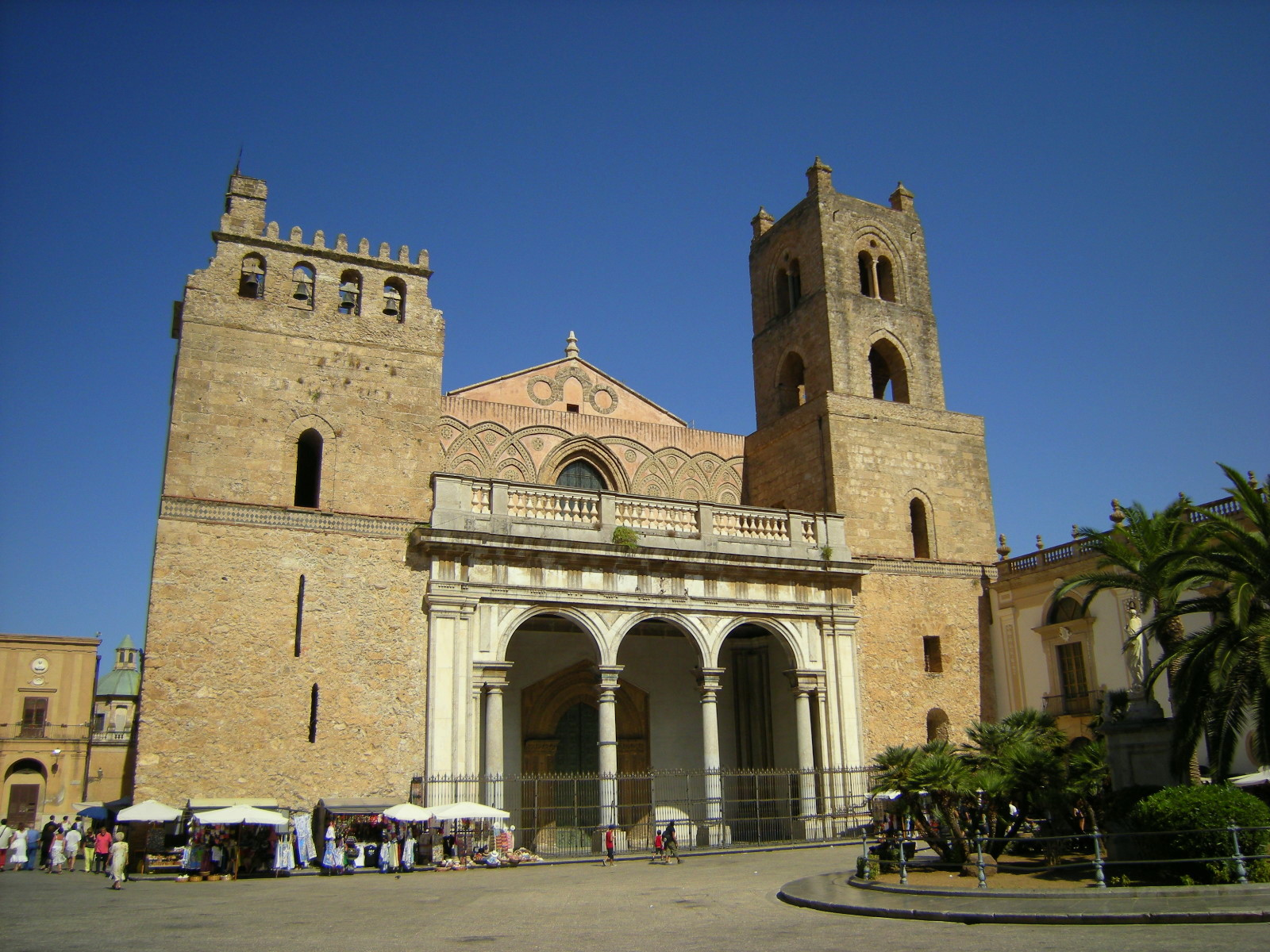
Santa Maria, Monreale

=== Monreale ===
- Cathedral of Santa Maria (1926)

== Monte Cassino ==
=== Cassino ===
- Cathedral of Maria Santissima Assunta e San Benedetto Abate (ancient)

=== Pescocostanzo ===
- Santa Maria del Colle (1976)

== Napoli (Naples) ==
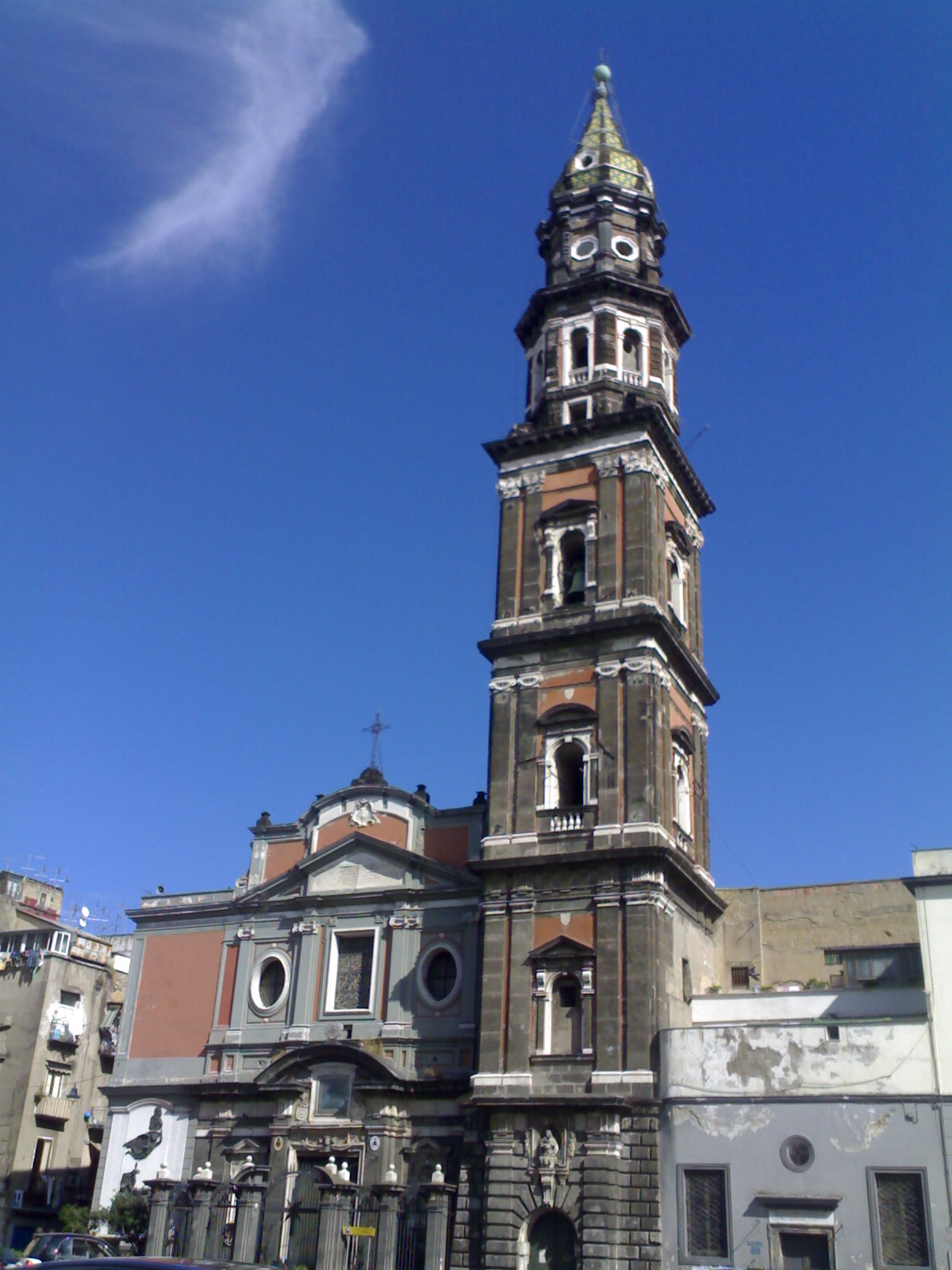
Santa Maria del Carmine Maggiore, Naples

=== Afragola ===
- Sant'Antonio di Padova

=== Casoria ===
- San Maurino (1999)

=== Ercolano ===
- Basilica of Santa Maria a Pugliano (1574)

=== Naples ===
- Basilica Santuario del Gesù Vecchio (1958)
- San Domenico Maggiore (1921)
- San Francesco di Paola (1836)
- San Gennaro ad Antignano (1905)
- San Giacomo Maggiore degli Spagnoli (1911)
- San Paolo Maggiore (1951)
- Santa Chiara
- Santa Maria della Neve (Ponticelli, near Napoli) (1988)
- Basilica del Carmine Maggiore (1917)
- Basilica di Santa Maria della Sanità
- Basilica di Santa Restituta
- Basilica di San Pietro ad Aram
- Basilica dell'Incoronata Madre del Buon Consiglio (1980)
- San Lorenzo Maggiore
- Basilica di San Giovanni Maggiore
- San Gennaro fuori le mura

=== Torre del Greco ===
- Santa Croce (1957)

== Nardò – Gallipoli ==
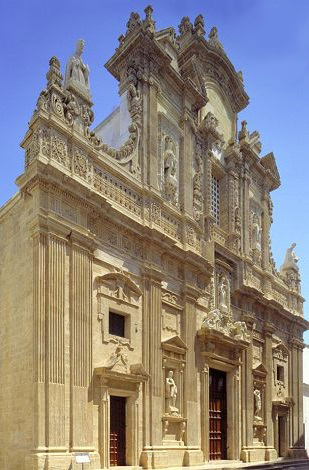
Sant'Agata, Gallipoli

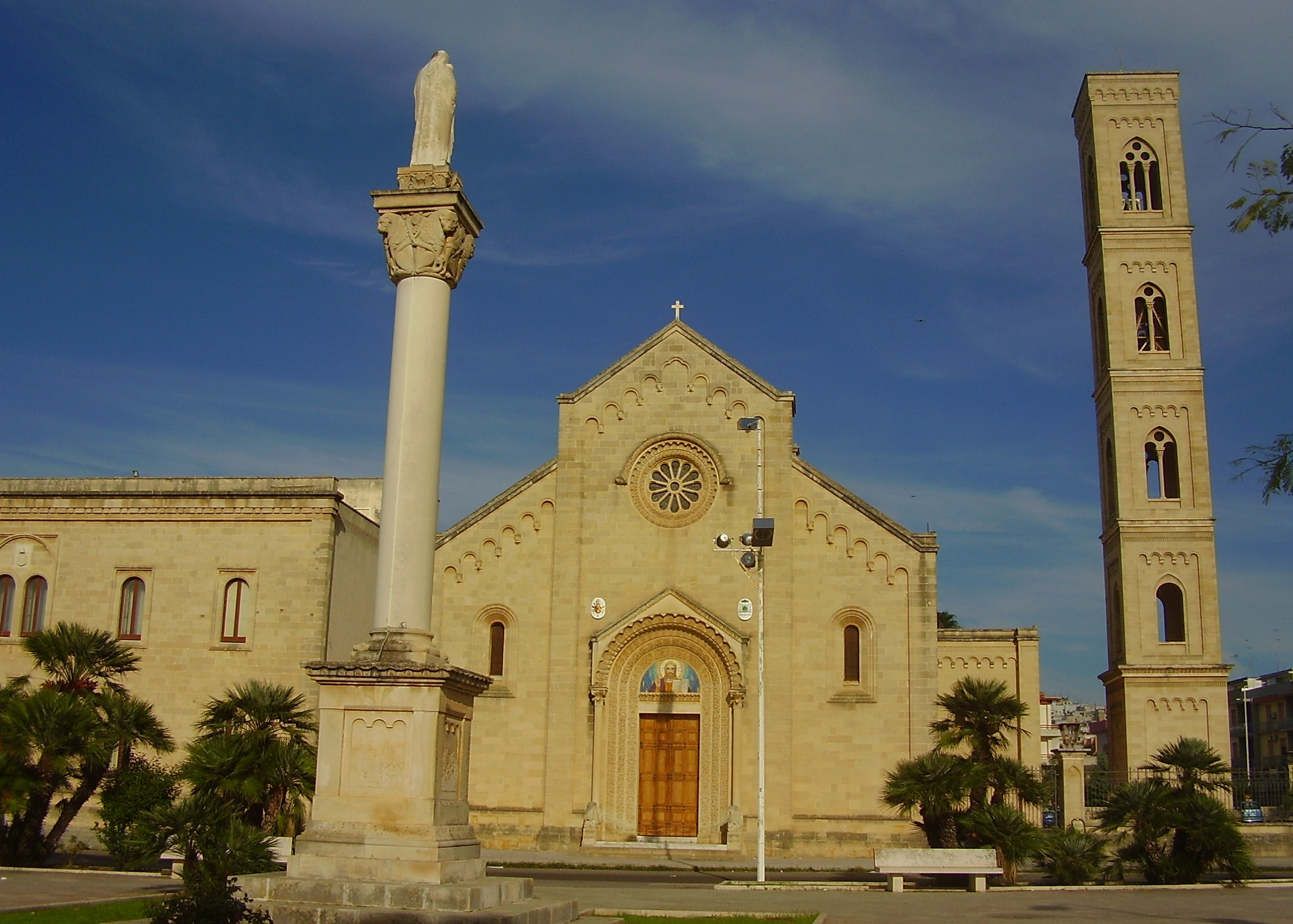
Santa Maria della Coltura, Parabita

=== Gallipoli ===
- Cathedral of Sant'Agata (1946)

=== Nardò ===
- Cathedral of Santa Maria Assunta (1980)

=== Parabita ===
- Santa Maria della Coltura (1999)

== Nicosia ==
=== Assoro ===
- San Leone (ancient)

=== Nicosia ===
- Santa Maria Maggiore (1819)
- San Nicolò (1967)

== Nocera Inferiore – Sarno ==
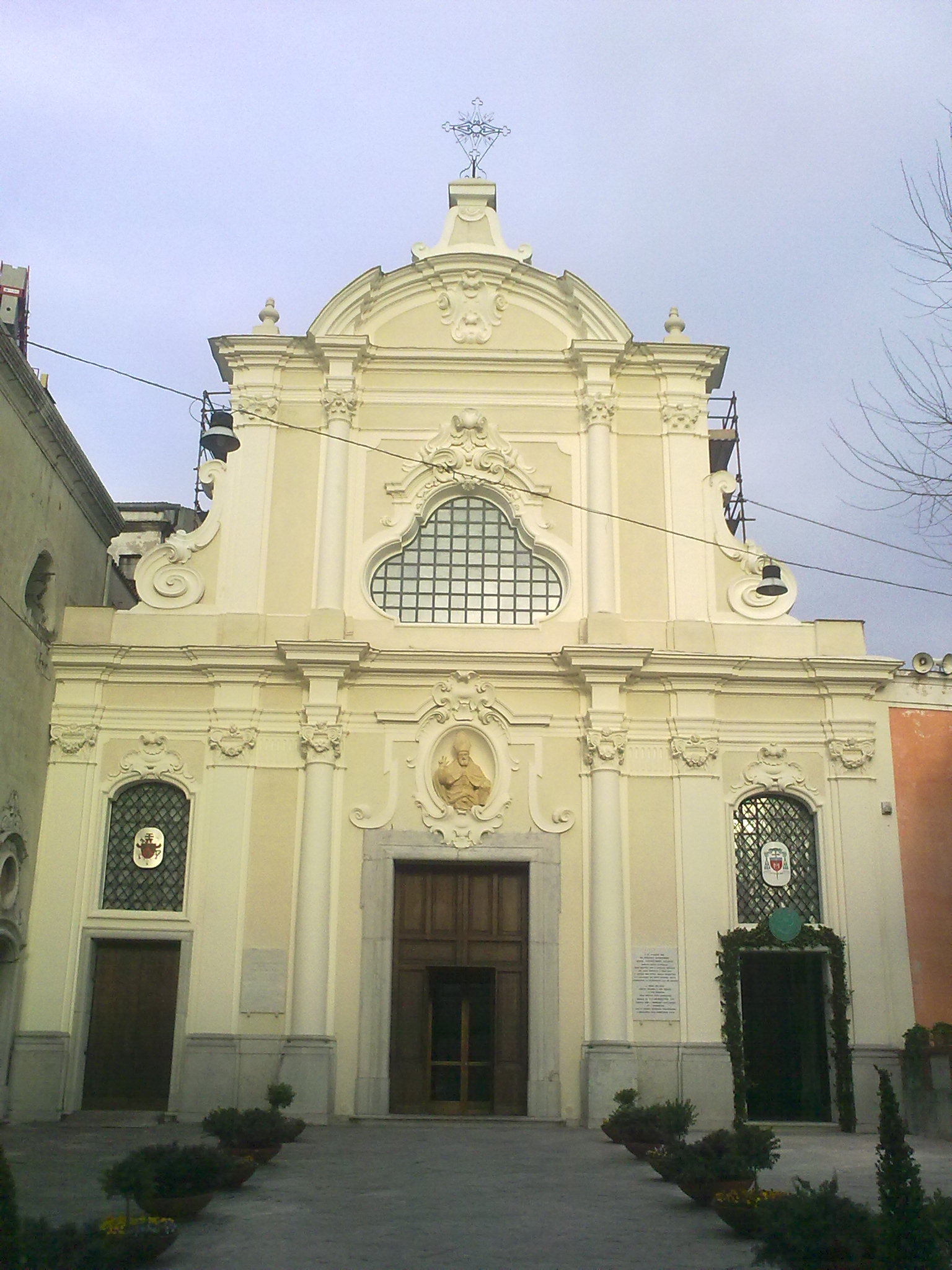
San Prisco, Nocera Inferiore

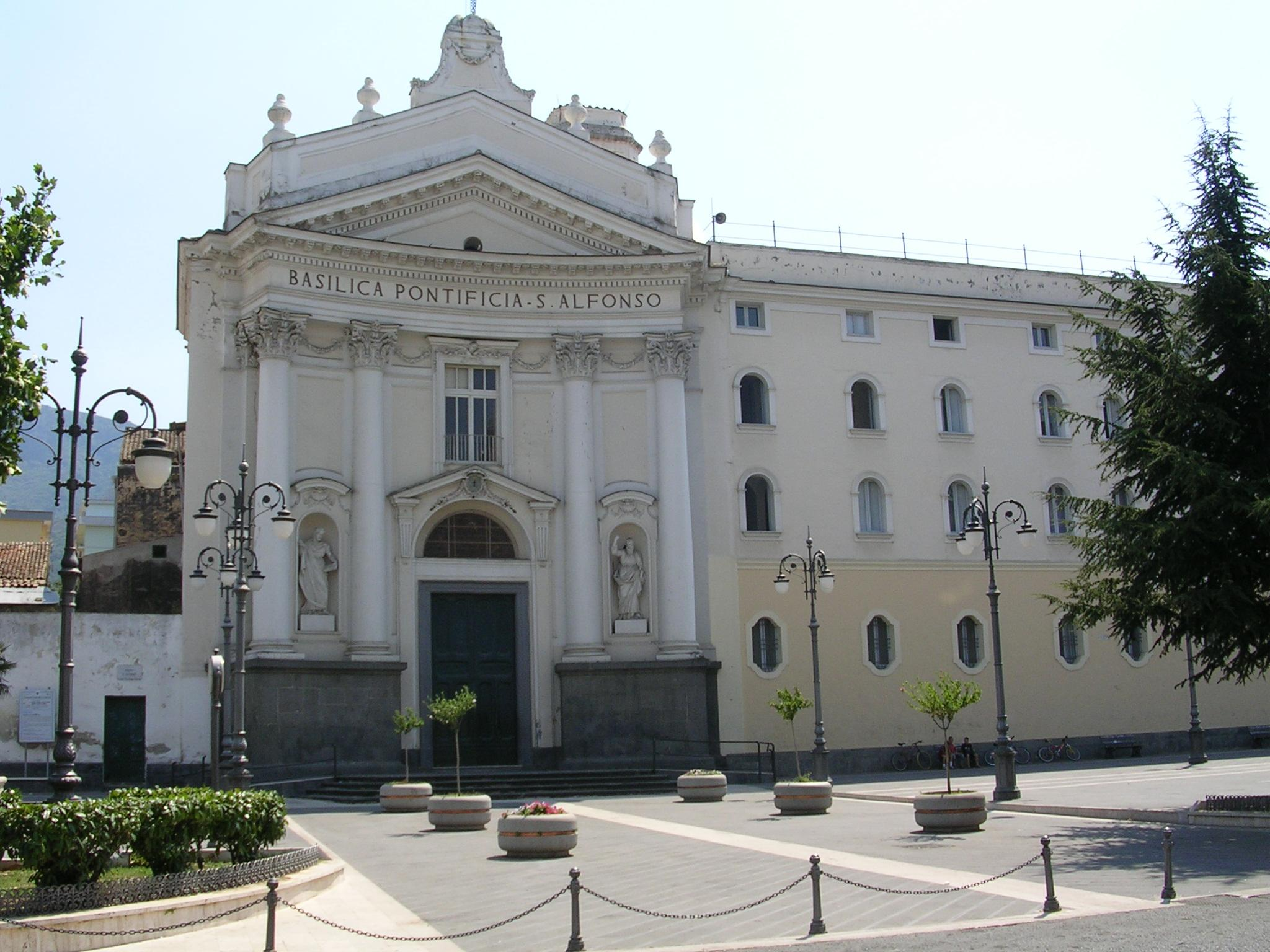
San Alfonso Maria de' Liquori, Pagani

=== Nocera Inferiore ===
- Cathedral of San Prisco (ancient)
- Sant'Anna (ancient)
- Sant'Antonio (ancient)

=== Nocera Superiore ===
- Santa Maria Santissima di Materdomini (1923)

=== Pagani ===
- Sant'Alfonso Maria de' Liguori (1908)

== Nola ==
=== Nola ===
- Cathedral of Santa Maria Assunta (1954)

=== San Giuseppe Vesuviano ===
- Santuario di San Giuseppe (2026)

=== Torre Annunziata ===
- Santa Maria della Neve (1979)

=== Visciano ===
- Madonna Consolatrice del Carpinello (1986)

== Noto ==
=== Modica ===
- Basilica Santuario Madonna delle Grazie (2015)

== Novara ==
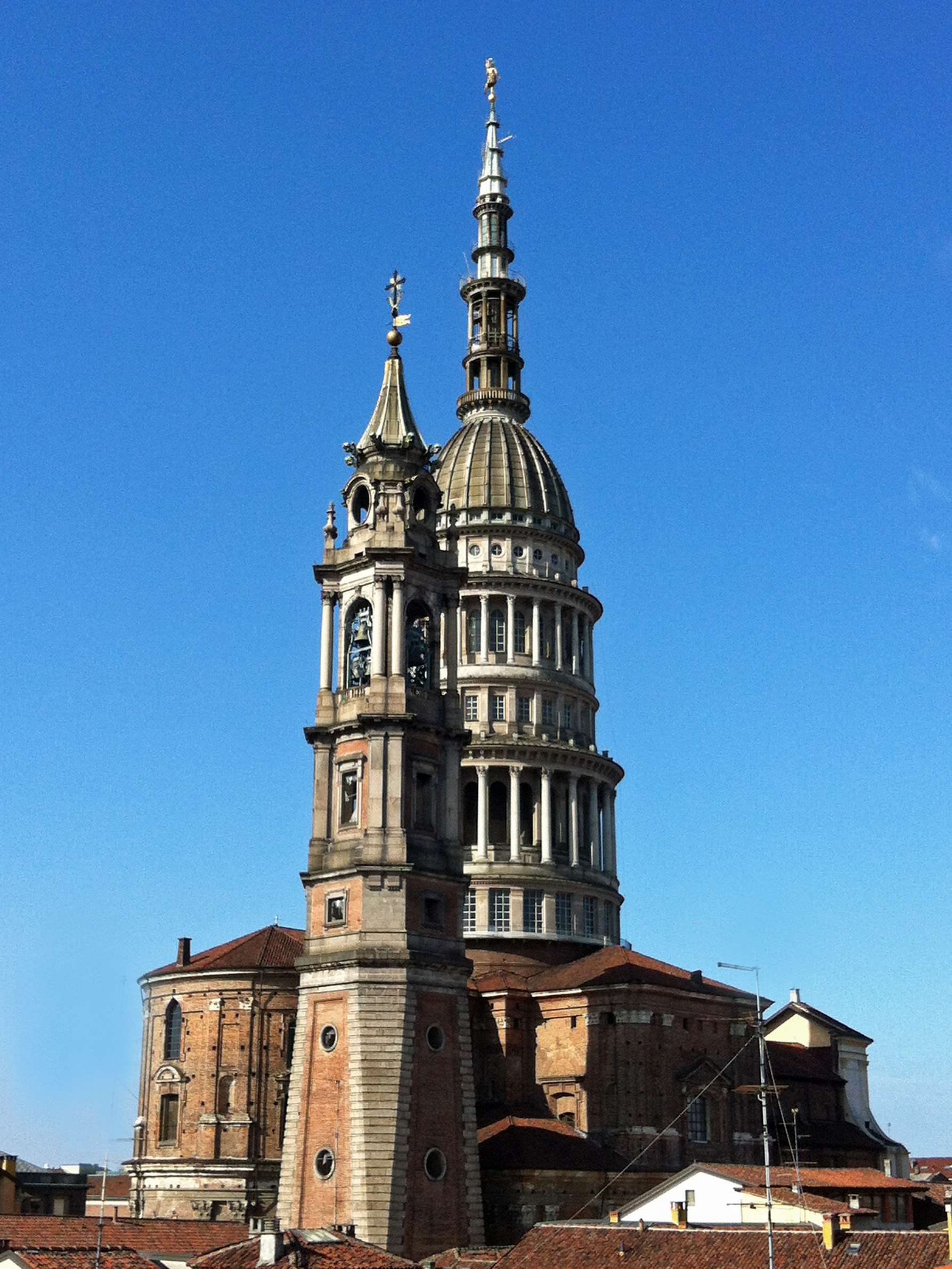
San Gaudenzio, Novara

=== Gozzano ===
- San Giuliano diacono (ancient)

=== Novara ===
- San Gaudenzio (ancient)

=== Orta San Giulio ===
- Basilica di San Giulio (ancient)

=== Re ===
- Santuario della Madonna del Sangue (1958)

=== Varallo Sesia ===
- Santa Maria delle Grazie (1931)

=== Verbania ===
- San Vittore (1947)

== Oria ==
=== Francavilla Fontana ===
- Santissimo Rosario (2012)

=== Oria ===
- Cathedral of Santa Maria Assunta in Cielo (1991)

== Oristano ==
=== Oristano ===
- Santa Maria del Rimedio (1957)

== Orvieto – Todi ==
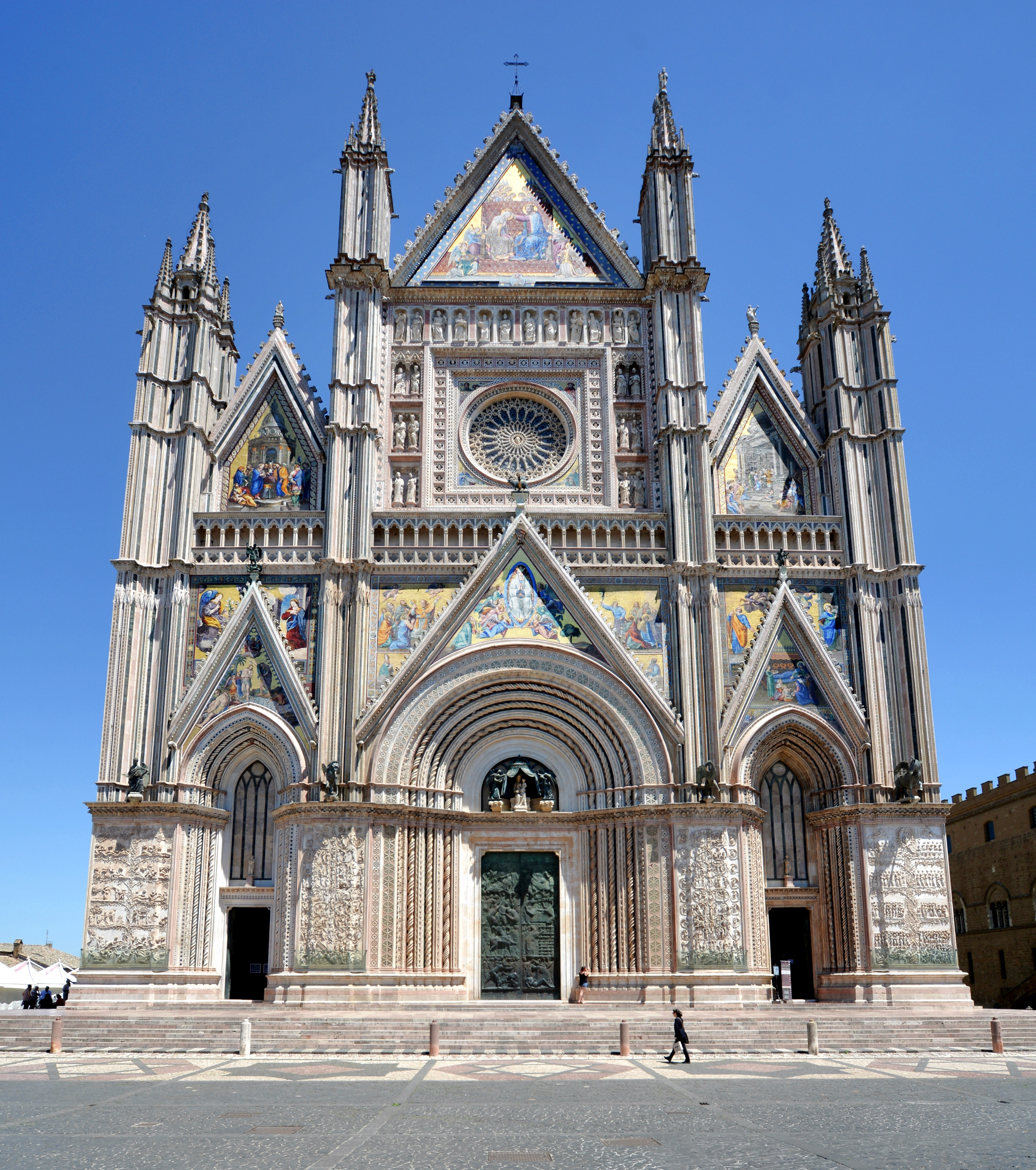
Santa Maria Assunta, Orvieto

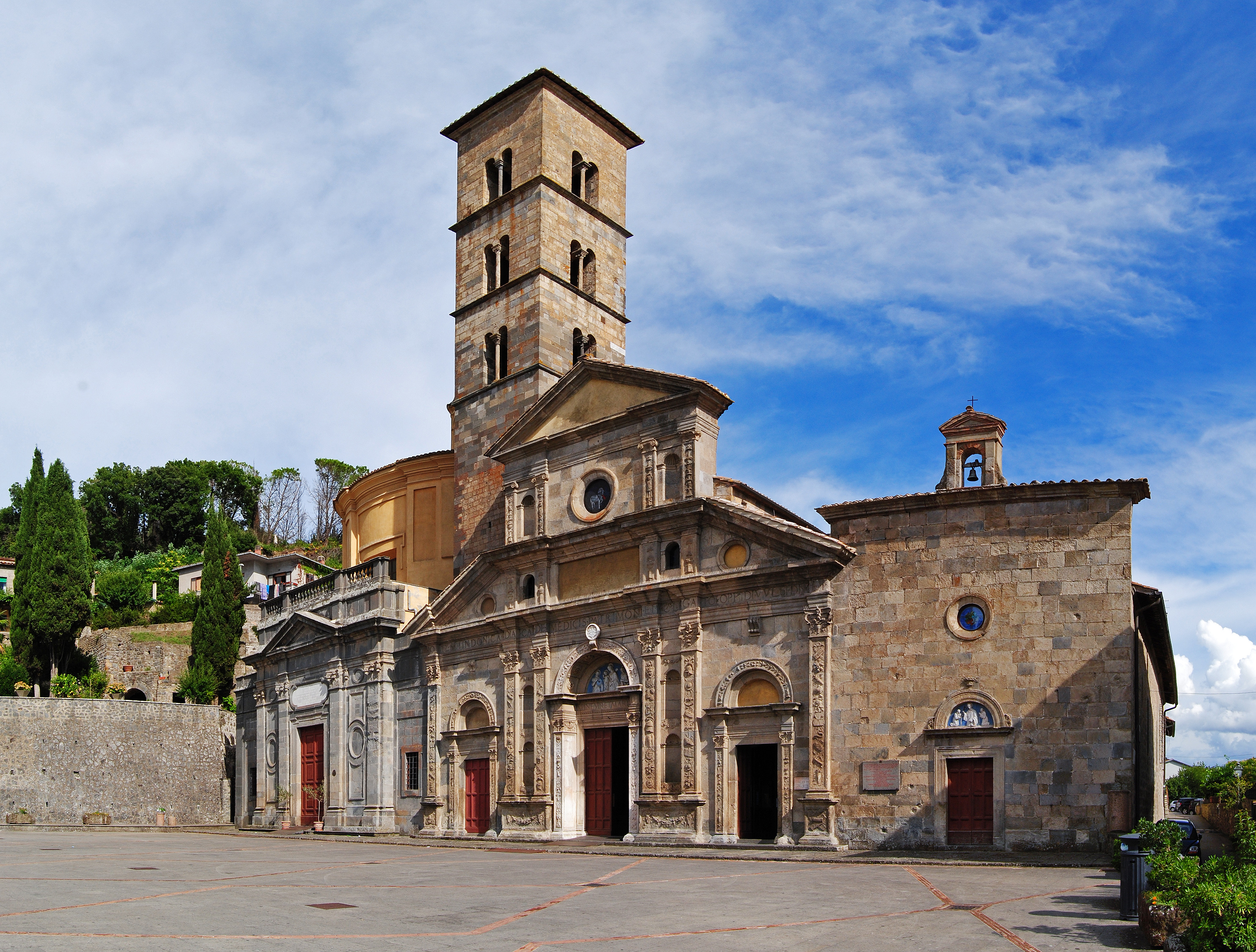
Santa Cristina, Bolsena

=== Bolsena ===
- Santa Cristina (1976)

=== Orvieto ===
- Cathedral of Santa Maria Assunta (1889)

=== Todi ===
- Amore Misericordioso (1982)
- Co-Cathedral of Santa Maria Annunziata (1958)

== Otranto ==
=== Galatina ===
- Santa Caterina d'Alessandria (1992)

=== Otranto ===
- Cathedral of Santa Maria Annunziata (1945)

== Padua ==
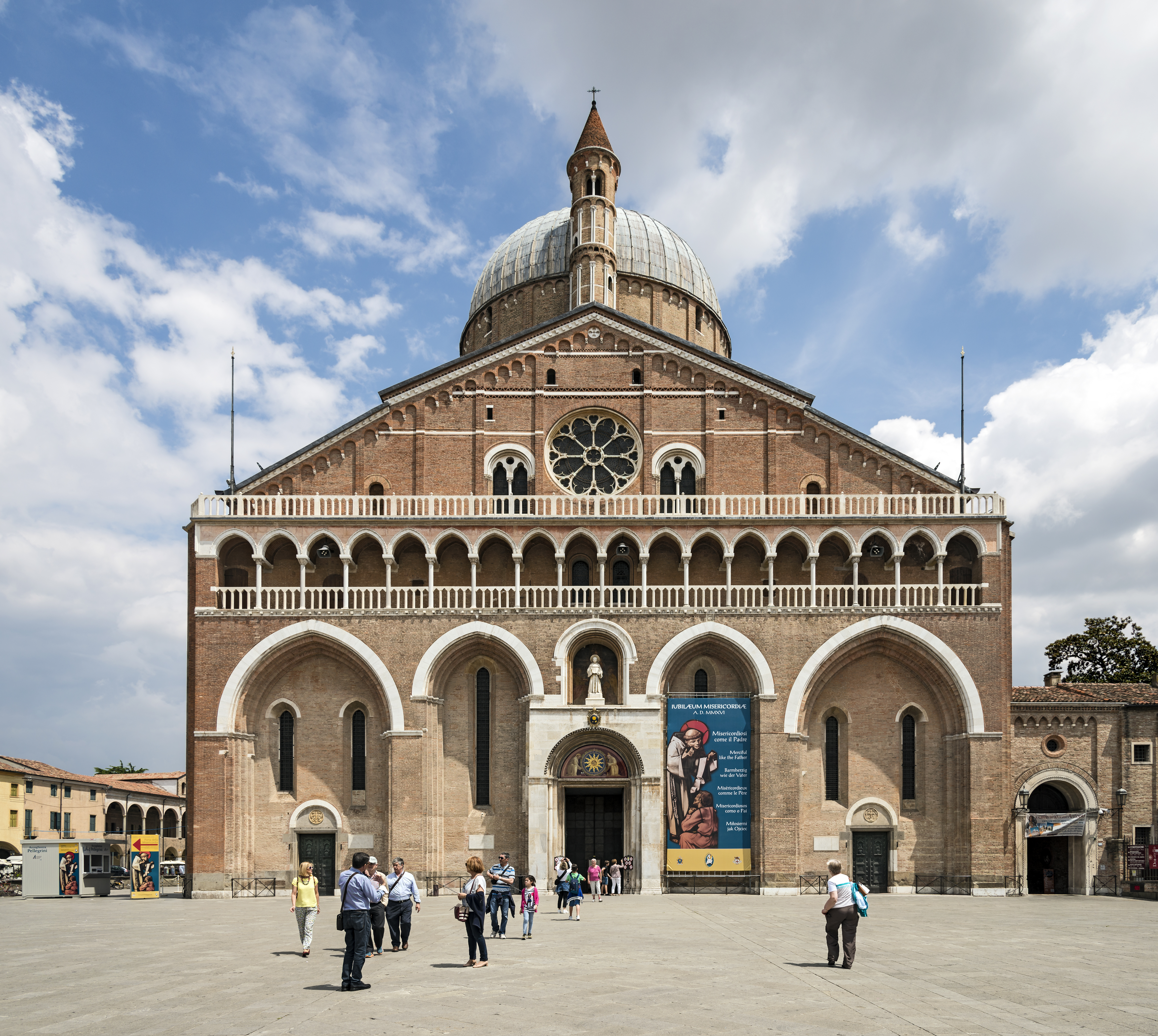
Sant'Antonio, Padua

=== Este ===
- Santa Maria della Grazie (1923)

=== Padua ===
- Sant'Antonio (ancient)
- Santa Giustina (1909)
- Cathedral of Santa Maria Assunta (ancient)
- Santa Maria del Monte Carmelo (1960)

=== Teolo ===
- Santa Maria Assunta (1954)

== Palermo ==
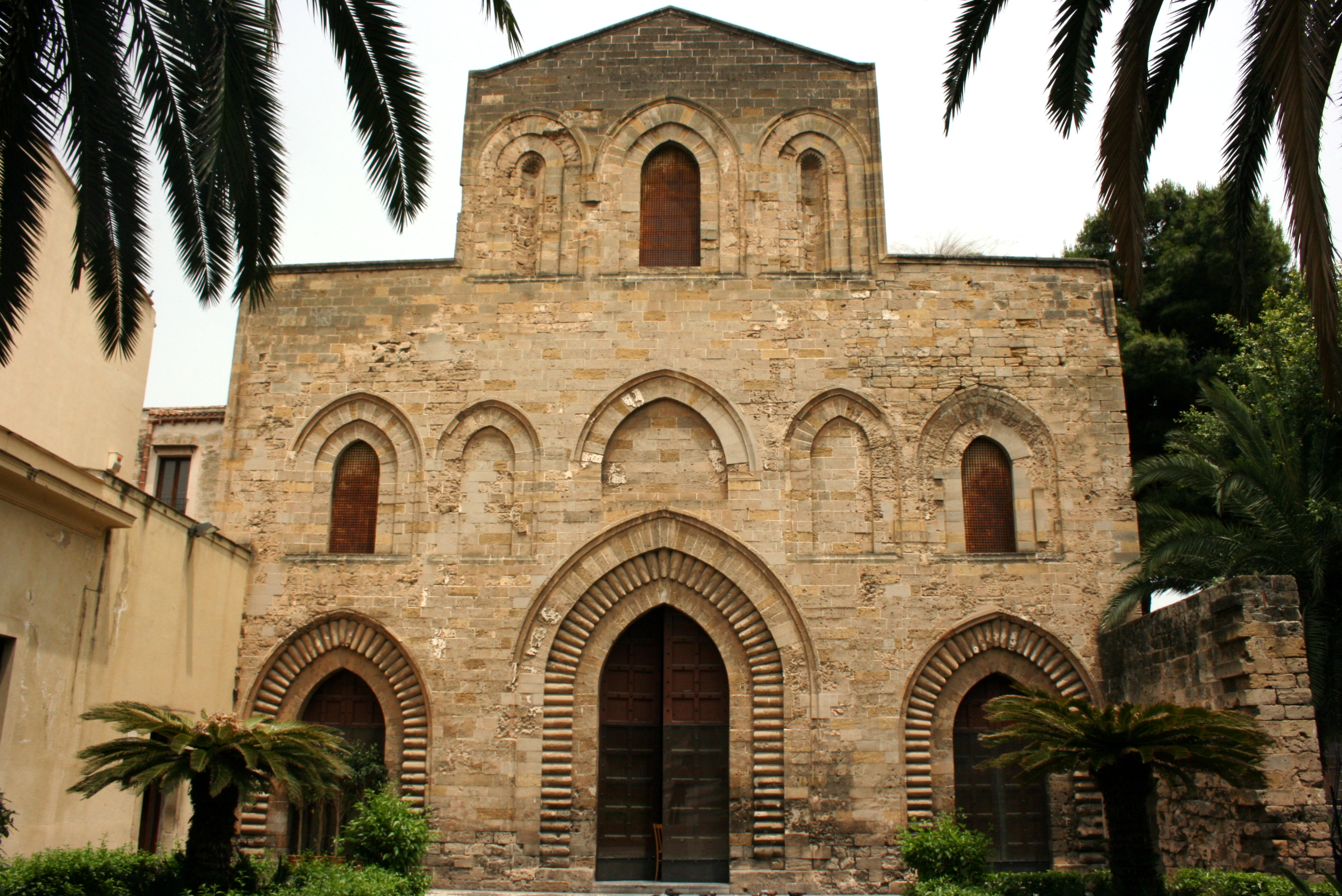
Santa Trinita, Palermo

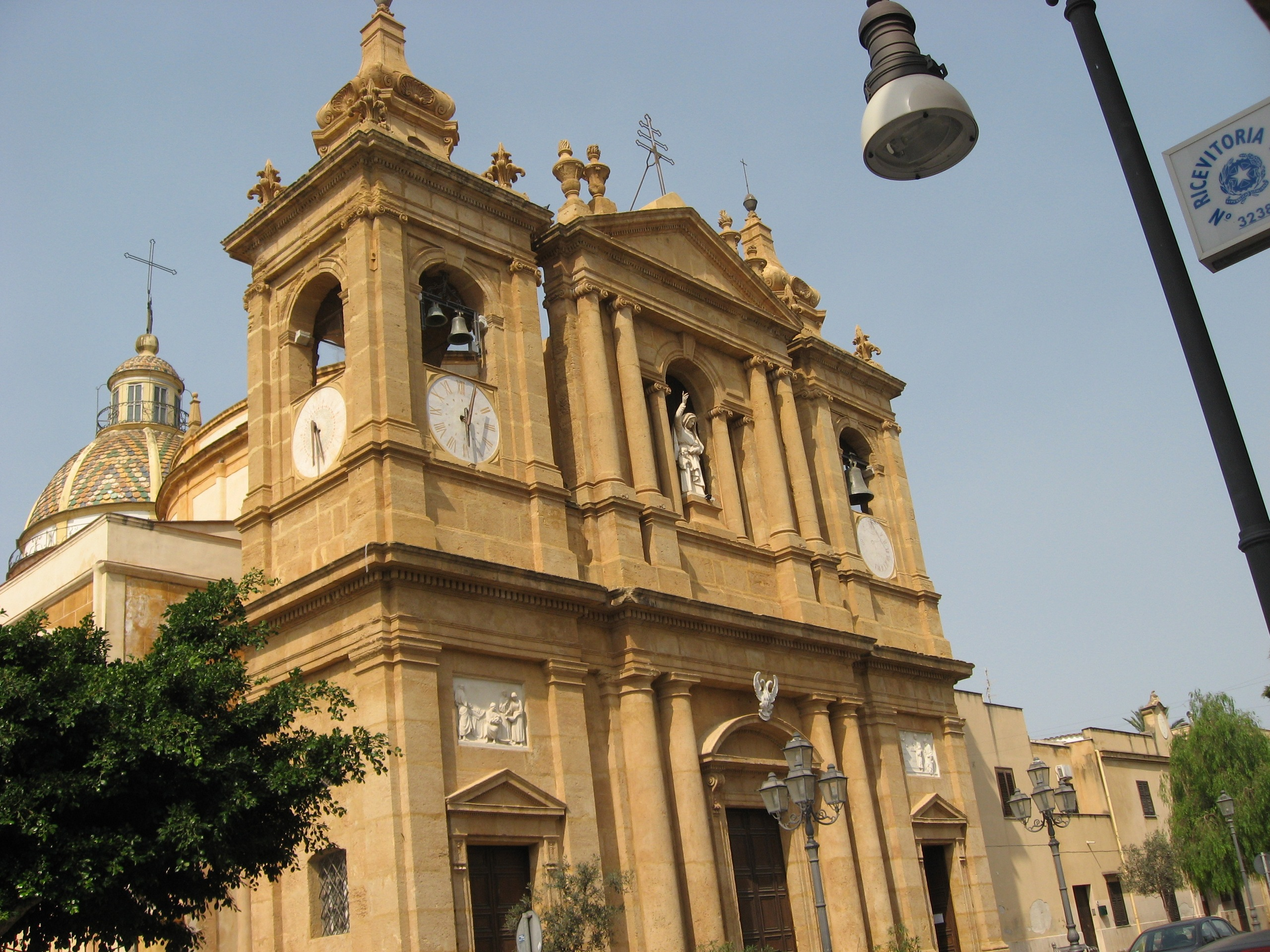
Soluntina di Sant'Anna, Santa Flavia

=== Altavilla Milicia ===
- Madonna della Milicia (2023)

=== Monreale ===
- San Martino delle Scale (1966)

=== Palermo ===
- San Francesco d'Assisi (1924)
- Santa Trinita (ancient)

=== Santa Flavia ===
- Basilica Soluntina di Sant'Anna (1764)

== Palestrina ==
=== Genazzano ===
- Santa Maria del Buon Consiglio (1903)

=== Palestrina ===
- Cathedral of Sant'Agapito (ancient)

== Parma ==
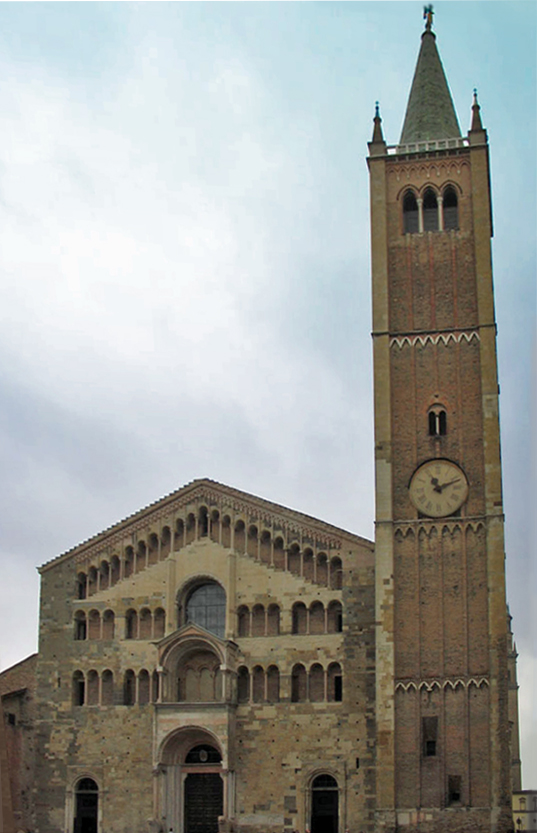
Santa Maria Assunta, Parma

=== Fontanellato ===
- Santuario della Beata Vergine del Santo Rosario (1903)

=== Parma ===
- Cathedral of Santa Maria Assunta (1834)
- Santa Maria della Steccata (2008)

== Patti ==
=== Patti ===
- Basilica Santuario Maria Santissima di Tindari (2018)

== Pavia ==
=== Pavia ===
- Santa Maria (1995)
- San Pietro in Ciel d'Oro (?)

== Perugia – Città della Pieve ==
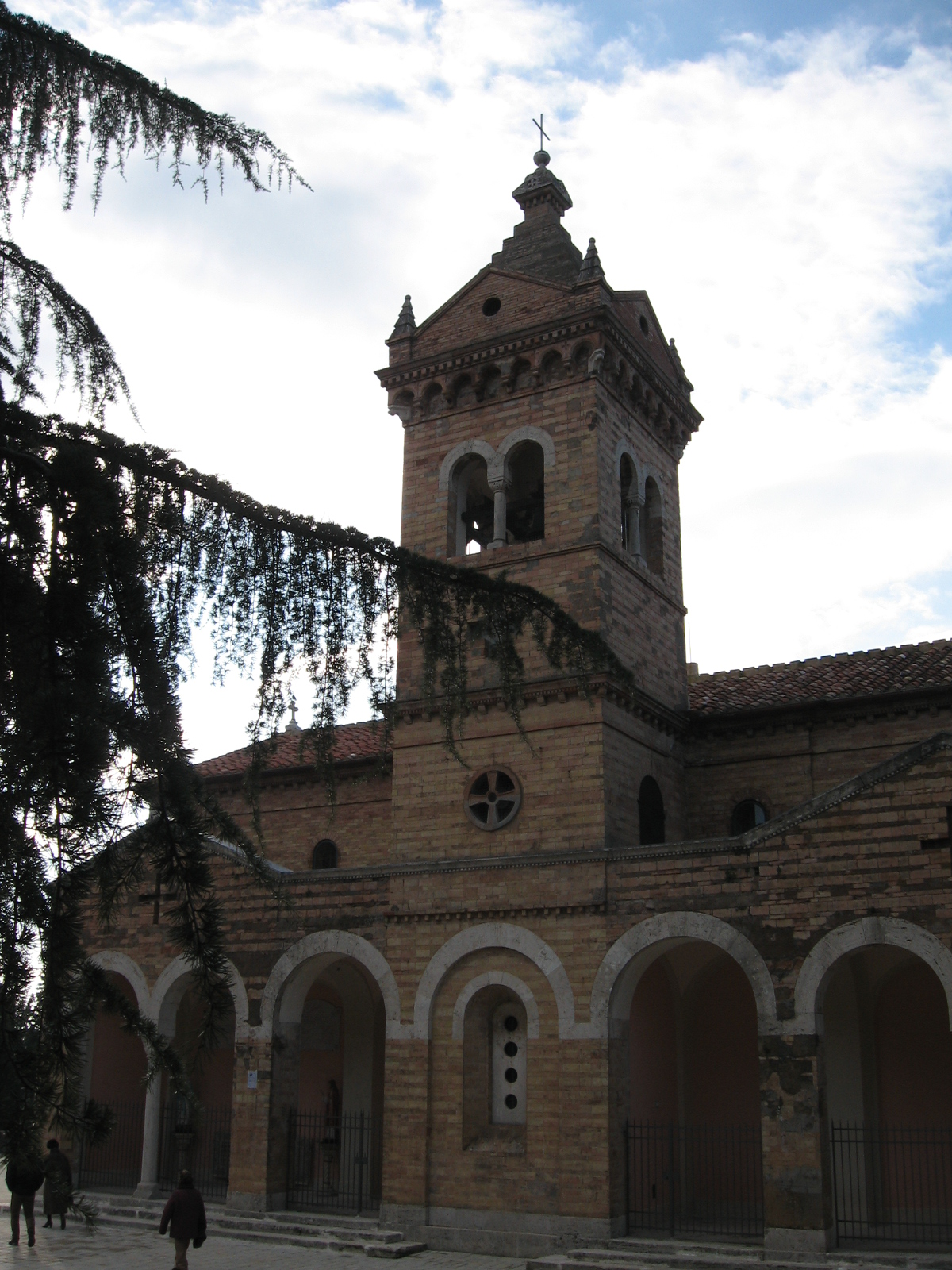
San Constanzo, Perugia

=== Perugia ===
- San Domenico (1961)
- San Constanzo (2008)

== Pesaro ==
=== Pesaro ===
- Cathedral of Santa Maria Assunta (ancient)
- Santi Decenzio e Germano (ancient)

== Pescara – Penne ==
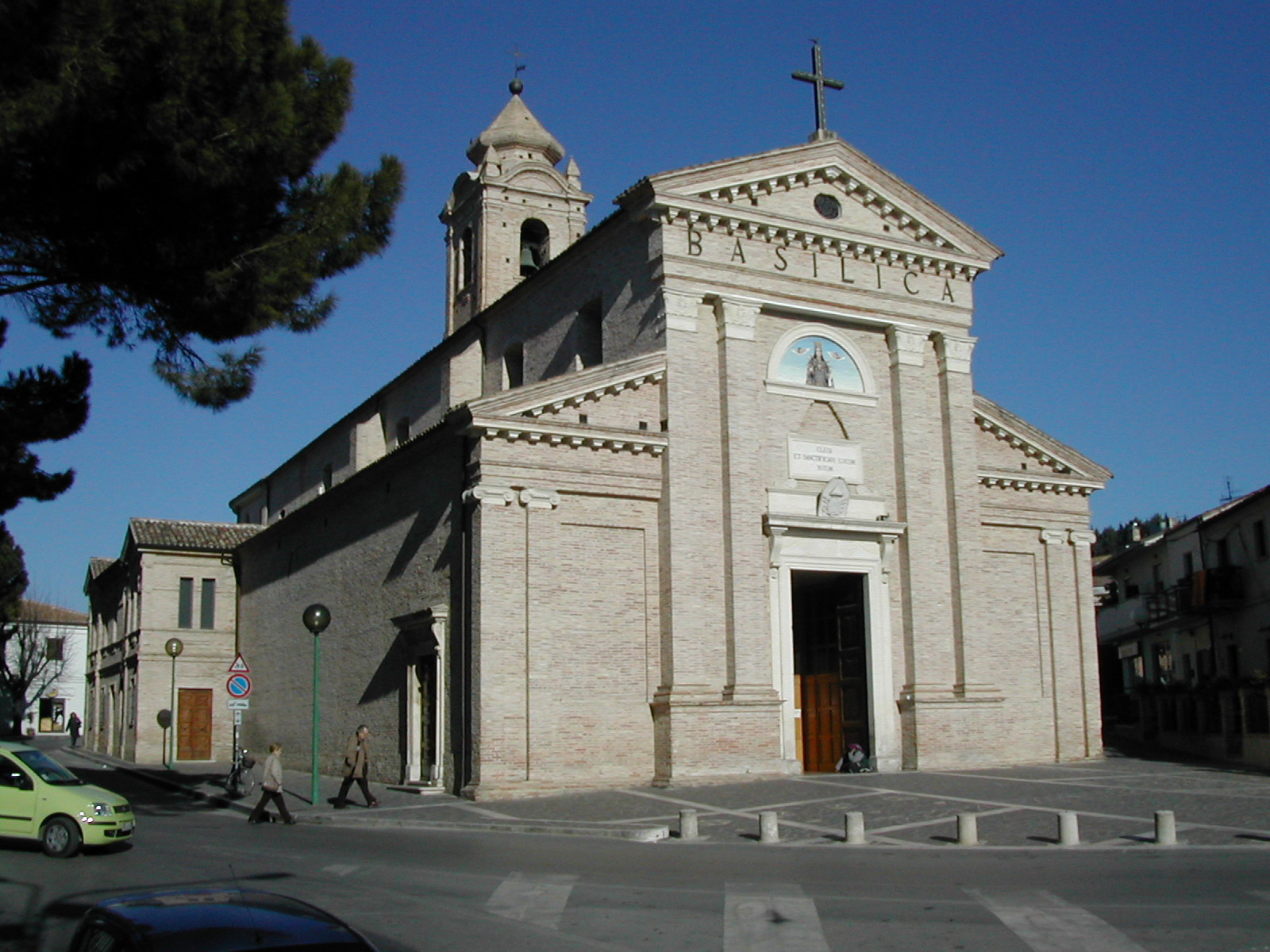
Santa Maria dei Sette Dolori, Pescara

=== Pescara ===
- Santa Maria dei Sette Dolori (1959)

== Pescia ==
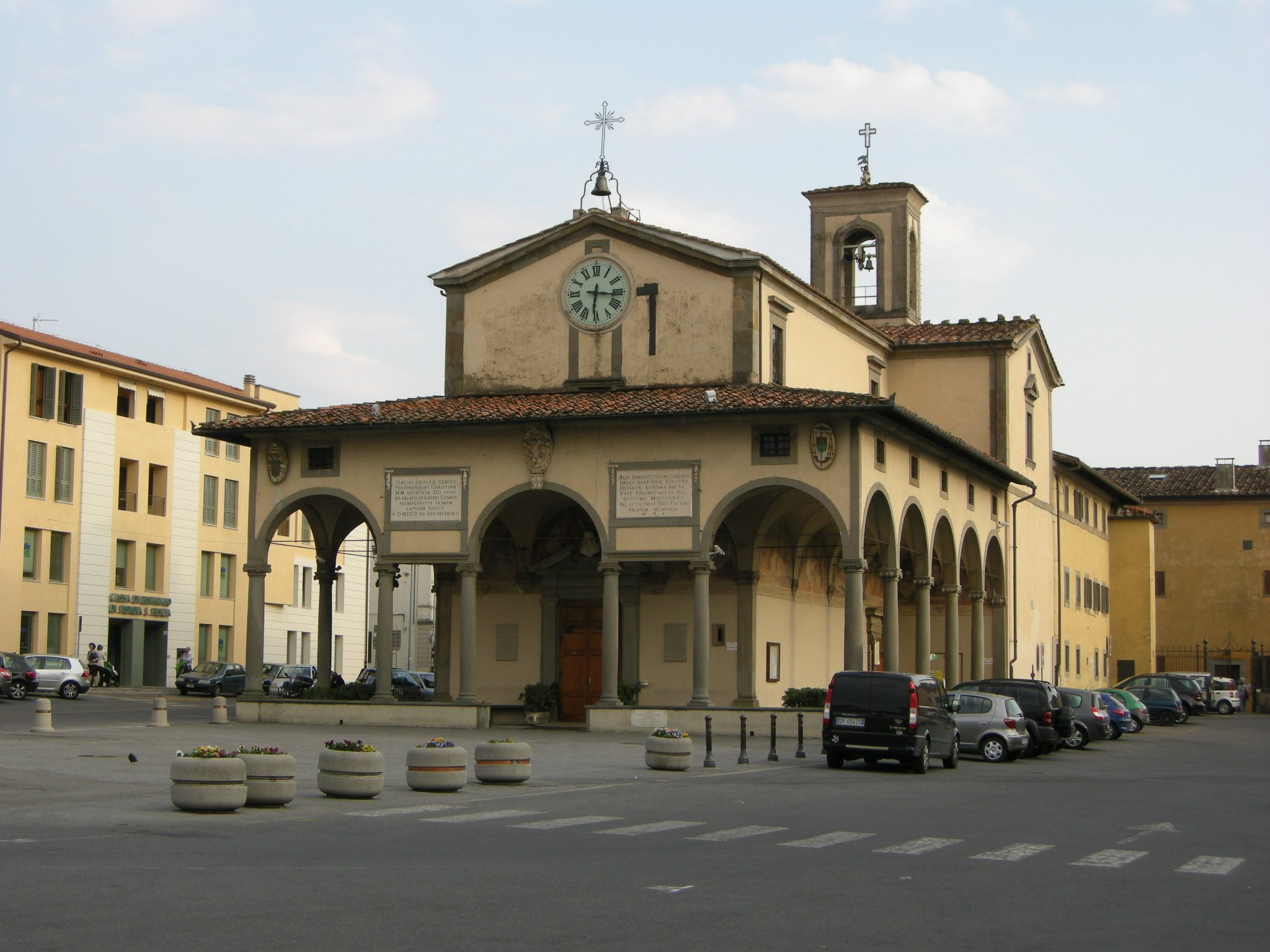
Santa Maria della Fontenuova, Monsummano Terme

=== Montecatini Terme ===
- Santa Maria Assunta (1988)

=== Monsummano Terme ===
- Maria Santissima della Fontenuova (1974)

== Piacenza – Bobbio ==
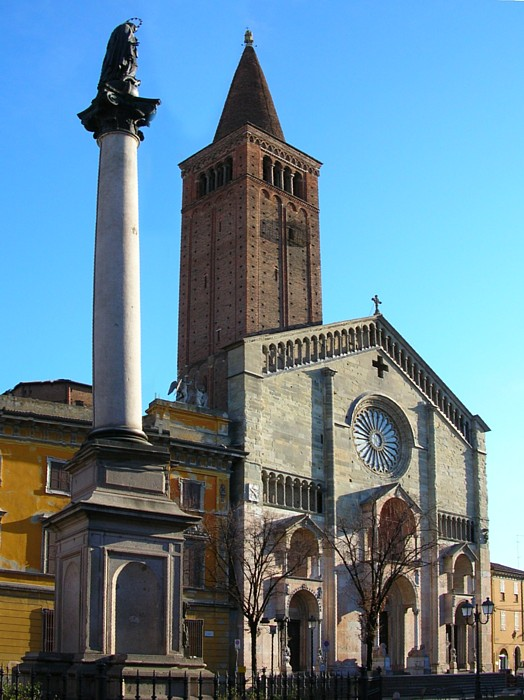
Santi Giustina e Maria Assunta, Piacenza

=== Bedonia ===
- Beata Vergine della Consolazione (1978)

=== Bobbio ===
- Santa Maria dell'Aiuto (1970)

=== Piacenza ===
- San Antonino (ancient)
- Cathedral of Santi Giustina e Maria Assunta (ancient)
- Santa Maria di Campagna (1954)
- San Savino (ancient)
- Santo Sepolcro (ancient)

== Piazza Armerina ==
=== Piazza Armerina ===
- Cathedral of Santa Maria Santissima Delle Vittorie (1962)

== Pinerolo ==
=== Pinerolo ===
- San Maurizio (2002)

== Pisa ==
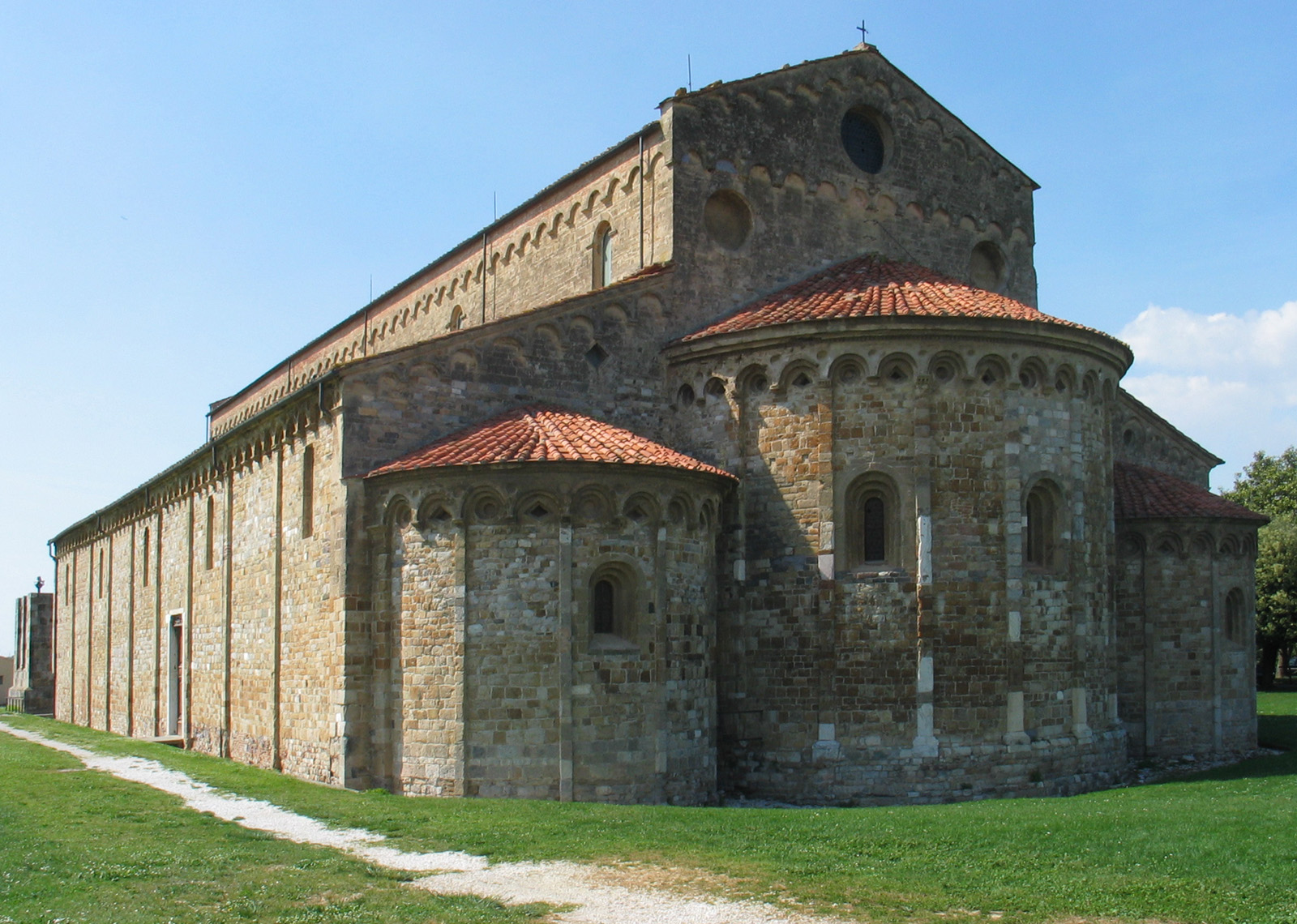
San Pietro Apostolo, Pisa

=== Pisa ===
- San Pietro Apostolo (ancient)

== Pistoia ==
=== Pistoia ===
- Santa Maria dell'Umiltà (1931)
- Cathedral of San Zeno (1965)

== Pompei ==
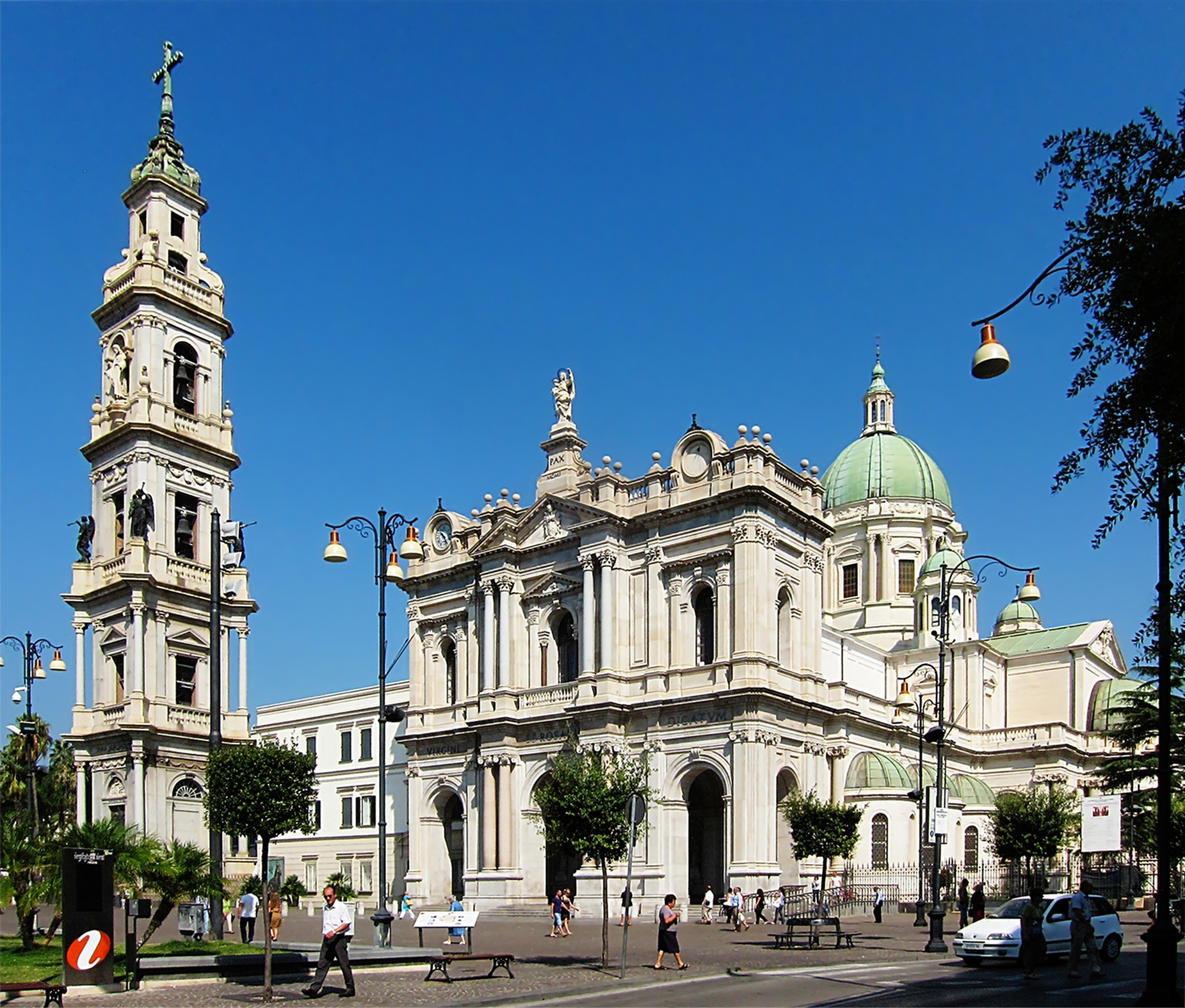
Shrine of the Virgin of the Rosary of Pompei

=== Pompei ===
- Shrine of the Virgin of the Rosary of Pompei (ancient)

== Potenza – Muro Lucano – Marsico Nuovo ==
=== Avigliano ===
- Santa Maria del Carmine (1999)

=== Potenza ===
- Cathedral of Santa Maria Assunta e San Gerardo Vescovo (1980)

=== Viggiano ===
- Madonna Nera del Sacro Monte (1965)

== Pozzuoli ==
=== Pozzuoli ===
- Cathedral of Santa Maria Assunta (1949)

== Prato ==
=== Prato ===
- Santa Maria delle Carceri (1939)
- Cathedral of Santo Stefano (1996)
- Santi Vincenzo Ferreri e Caterina de' Ricci (1947)

== Ragusa ==
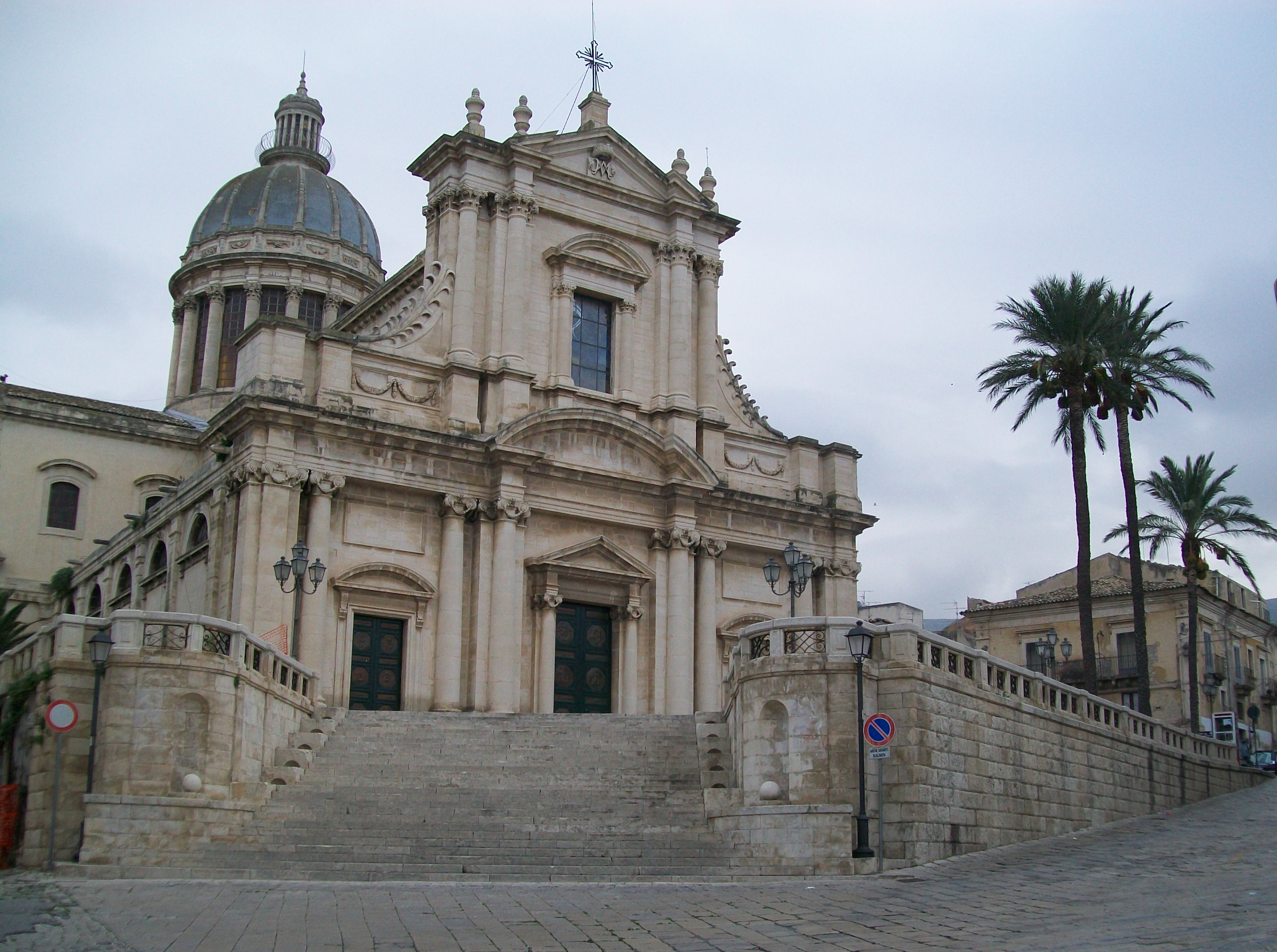
Santissima Annunziata, Comiso

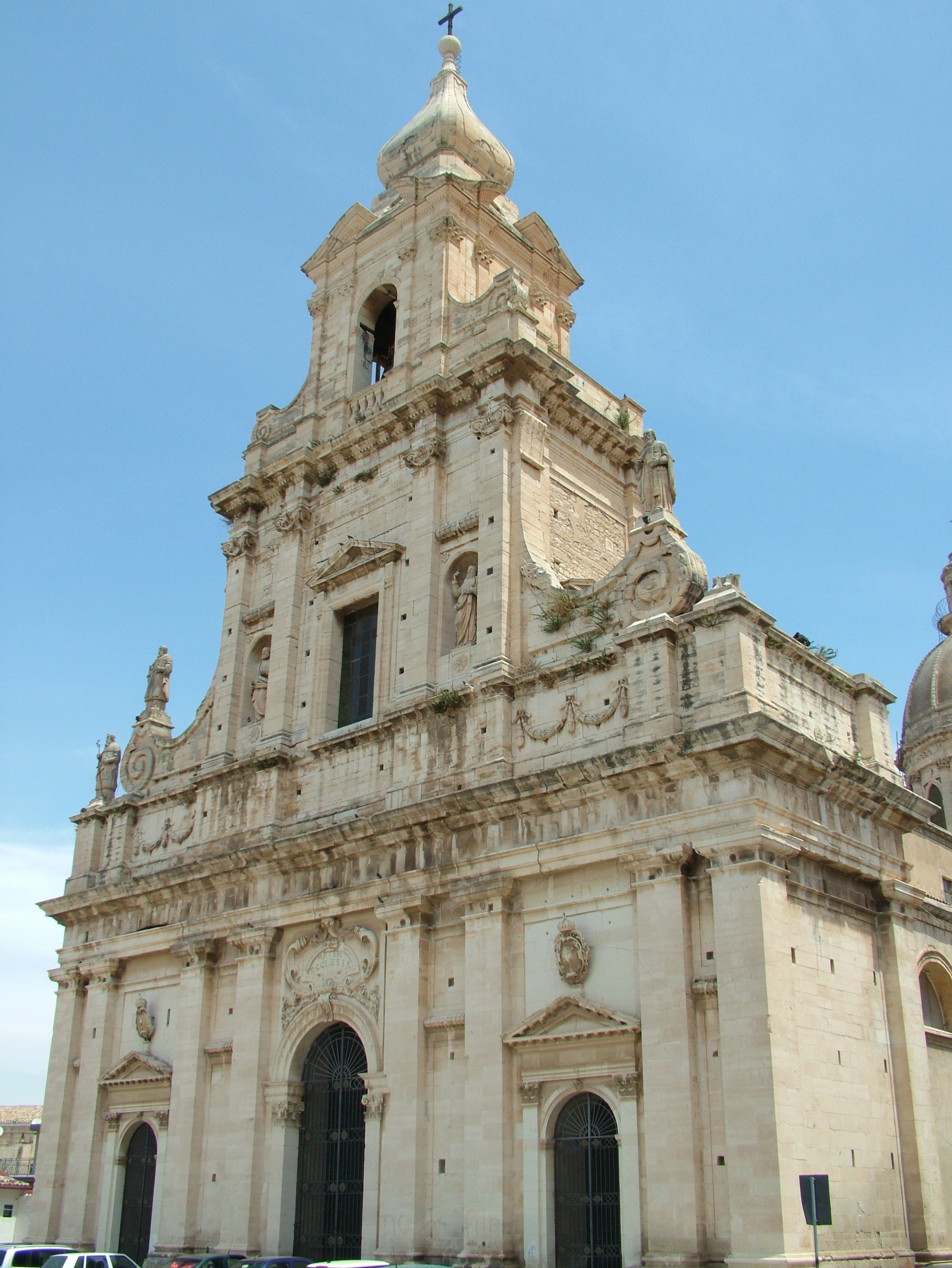
Santa Maria delle Stelle, Comiso

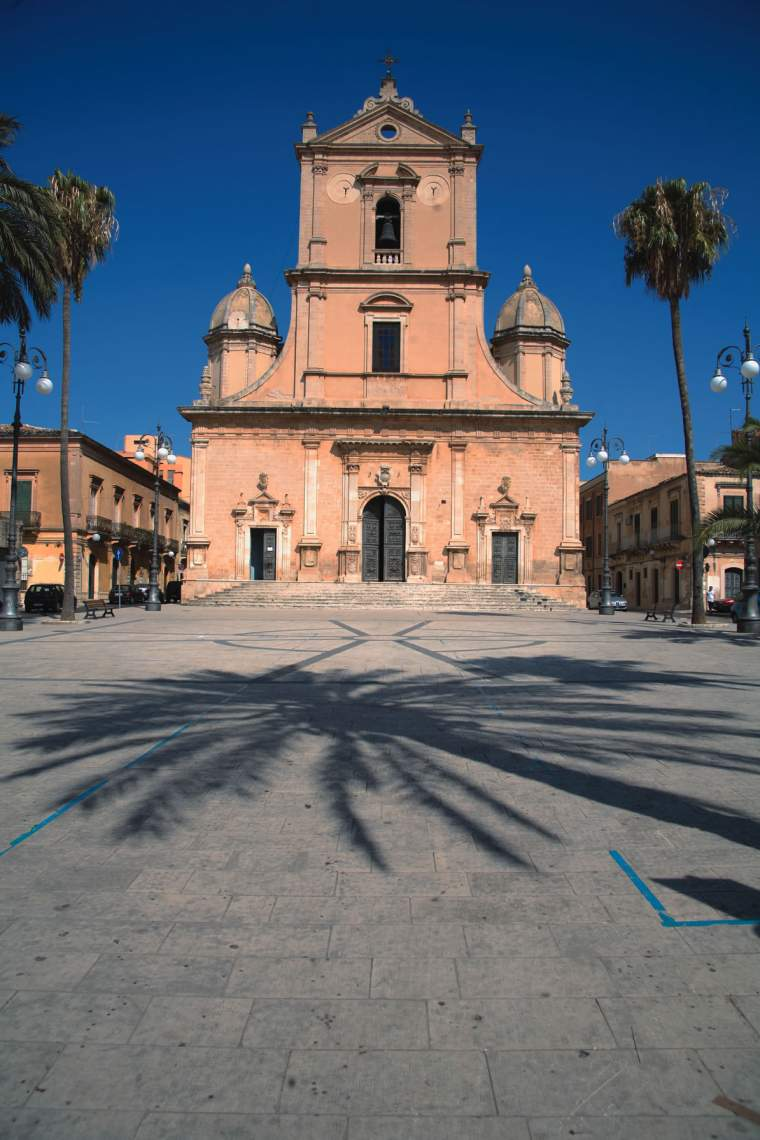
San Giovanni Battista, Vittoria

=== Comiso ===
- Santissima Annunziata (ancient)
- Santa Maria delle Stelle (ancient)

=== Monterosso Almo ===
- Santa Maria Assunta (ancient)

=== Vittoria ===
- San Giovanni Battista (ancient)

== Ravenna – Cervia ==
=== Ravenna ===
- Sant'Apollinare in Classe (1960)
- Santa Maria in Porto (1960)
- Cathedral of the Resurrection (1960)
- San Vitale (1960)
- Sant'Apollinare Nuovo
- San Francesco

== Reggio Calabria – Bova ==
=== Reggio Calabria ===
- Cathedral of Maria Santissima Assunta in Cielo (1978)

== Reggio Emilia – Guastalla ==
=== Boretto ===
- San Marco (1956)

=== Reggio Emilia ===
- Madre della Consolazione (1971)
- Santa Maria della Ghiara (1954)
- San Prospero

== Rieti ==
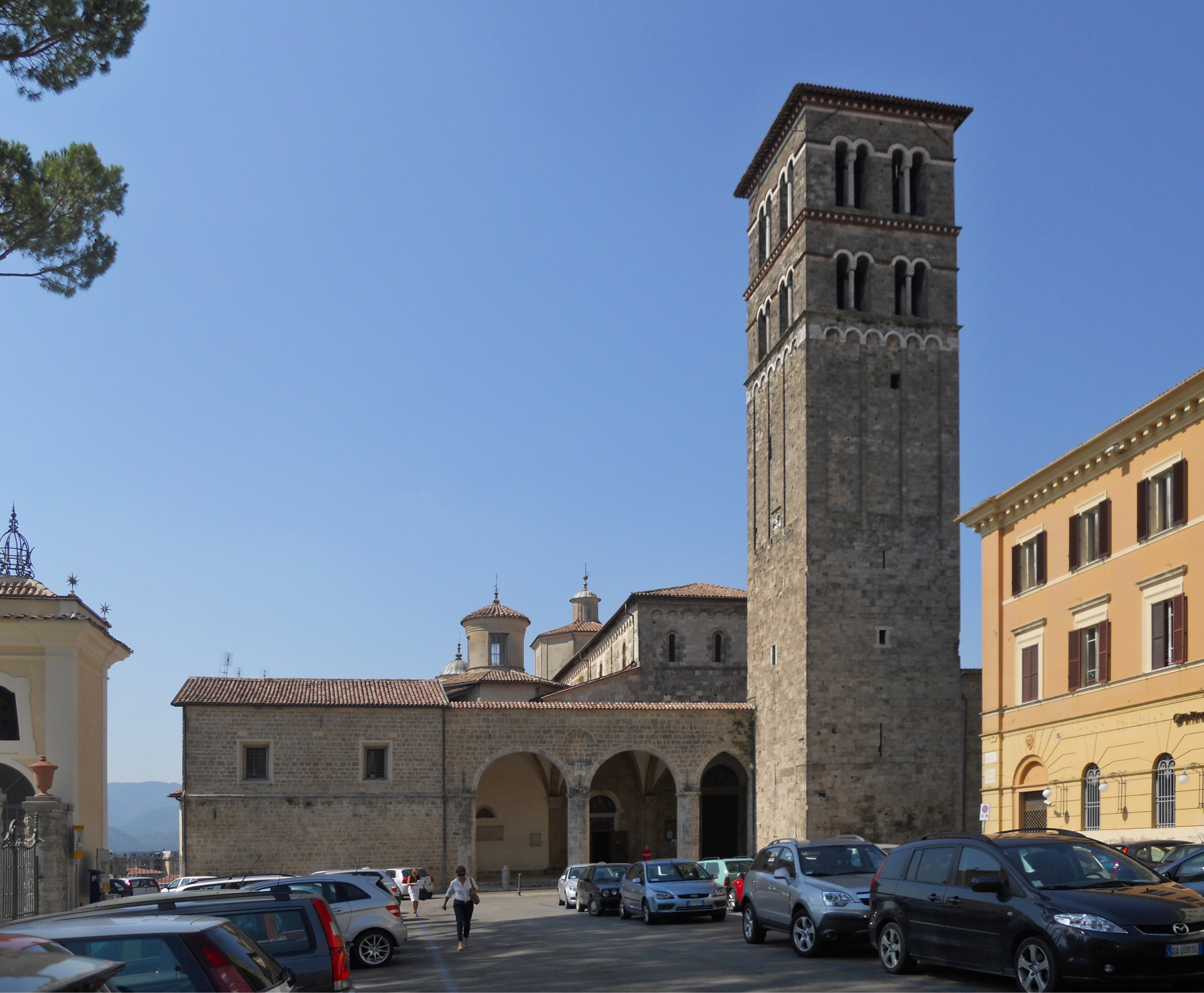
Santa Maria Assunta, Rieti

=== Rieti ===
- Cattedrale di Santa Maria Assunta (1841)

== Rome ==
There are 4 major basilicas of the Catholic Church in the Italian peninsula; 3 in the city of Rome proper and 1 in Vatican City. The latter is completely surrounded by the city of Rome and is part of the Diocese of Rome.

- San Pietro in Vaticano (ancient)
- San Giovanni in Laterano (ancient)
- San Paolo fuori le Mura (ancient)
- Santa Maria Maggiore (ancient)

There are 62 minor basilicas of the Catholic Church in Rome, excluding the above major basilicas.

=== Rome ===
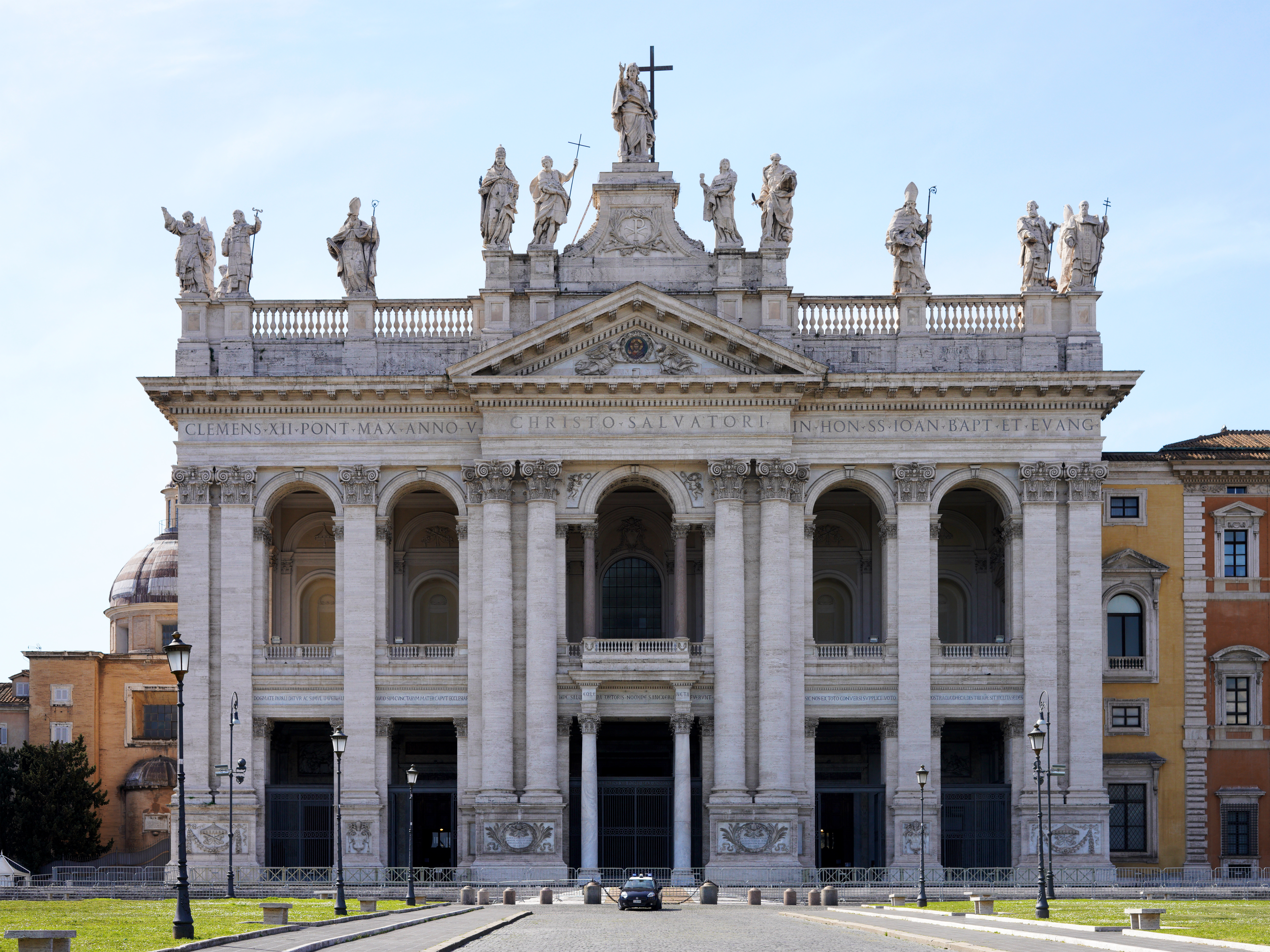
San Giovanni in Laterano, Rome

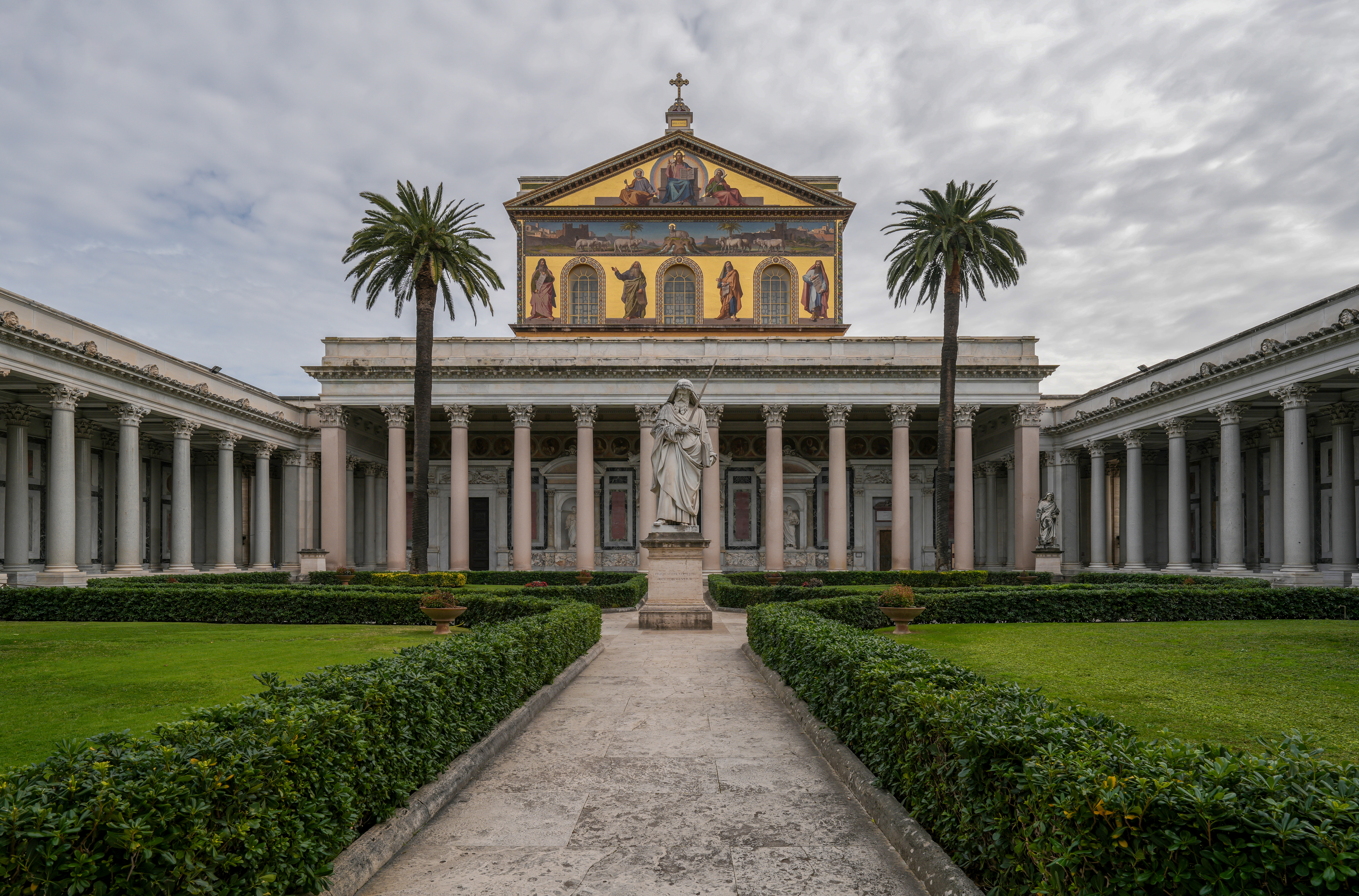
San Paolo fuori le Mura, Rome

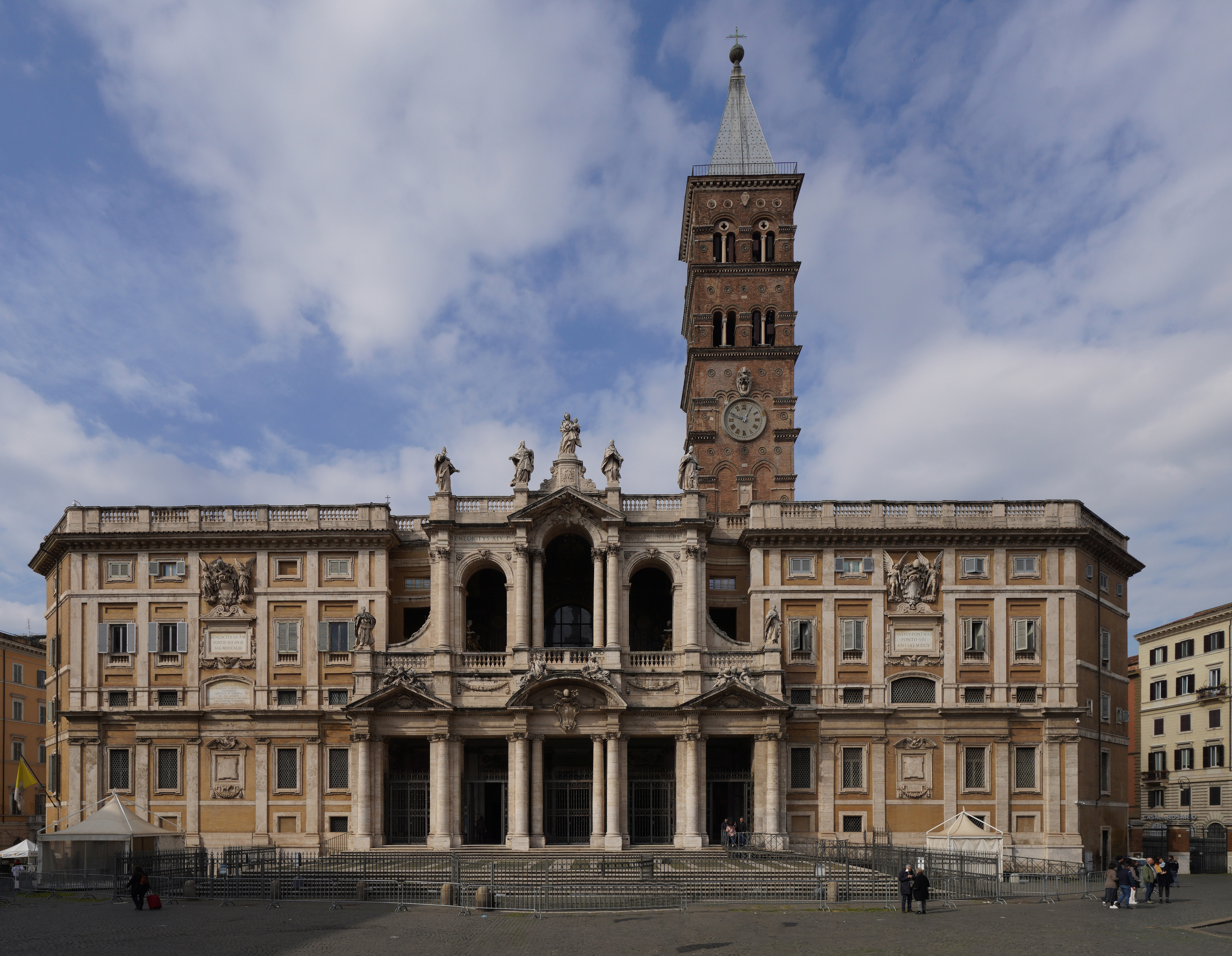
Santa Maria Maggiore, Rome

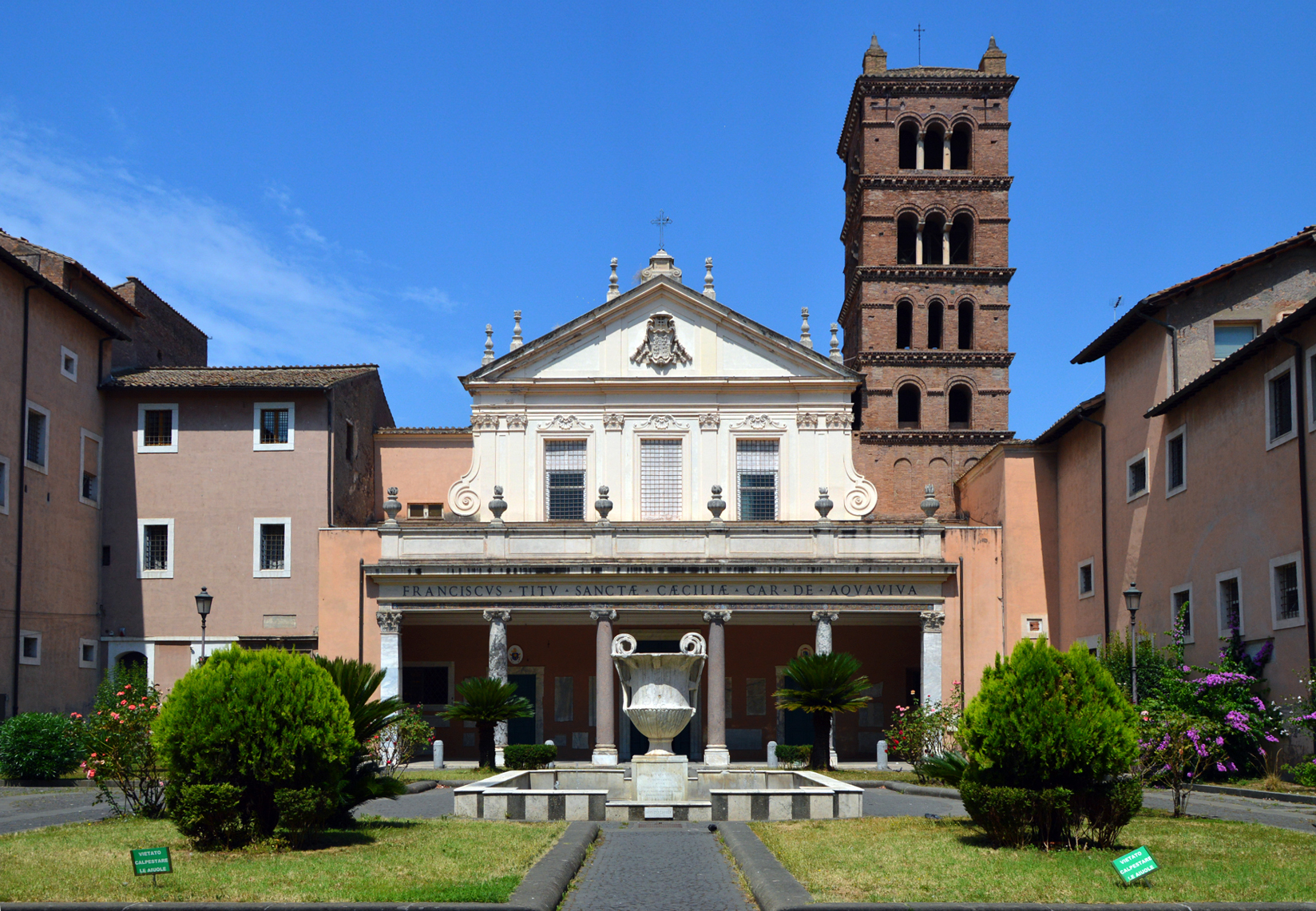
Santa Cecilia in Trastevere, Rome

- Nostra Signora di Guadalupe e San Filippo Martire (1991)
- Sacro Cuore di Cristo Re (1965)
- Sacro Cuore di Gesù a Castro Pretorio (1921)
- Sacro Cuore di Maria (Cuore Immacolato di Maria) (1959)
- Sant'Agnese fuori le Mura (ancient)
- Sant'Agostino (1999)
- Santi Ambrogio e Carlo (1929)
- Sant'Anastasia al Palatino (ancient)
- Sant'Andrea delle Fratte (1942)
- Sant'Andrea della Valle (1965)
- Sant'Antonio da Padova in Via Merulana (1931)
- Sant'Apollinare alle Terme Neroniane-Alessandrine (1984)
- Santa Balbina (ancient)
- San Bartolomeo all'Isola (ancient)
- Santi Bonifacio e Alessio (ancient)
- San Camillo de Lellis (1965)
- Santa Cecilia in Trastevere (ancient)
- Santi Celso e Giuliano (ancient)
- San Clemente al Laterano (ancient)
- Santi Cosma e Damiano (ancient)
- San Crisogono in Trastevere (ancient)
- Santa Croce in Gerusalemme (ancient)
- Santa Croce in Via Flaminia (1964)
- Santi Dodici Apostoli (ancient)
- Sant'Eugenio (1951)
- Sant'Eustachio (ancient)
- Santa Francesca Romana (Santa Maria Nova) (ancient)
- San Giovanni Battista dei Fiorentini (1918)
- San Giovanni Bosco (1965)
- Santi Giovanni e Paolo al Celio (ancient)
- San Giuseppe al Trionfale (1970)
- San Lorenzo in Damaso (ancient)
- San Lorenzo in Lucina (1908)
- San Lorenzo fuori le Mura (ancient)
- San Marco Evangelista al Campidoglio (ancient)
- Santa Maria degli Angeli e dei Martiri (1920)
- Santa Maria in Aracoeli (ancient)
- Santa Maria Ausiliatrice (1969)
- Santa Maria in Cosmedin (ancient)
- Santa Maria ad Martyres in Campo (Pantheon) (ancient)
- Santa Maria sopra Minerva (ancient)
- Santa Maria in Montesanto (1825)
- Santa Maria del Popolo (ancient)
- Santa Maria Regina degli Apostoli alla Montagnola (1984)
- Santa Maria in Trastevere (ancient)
- Santa Maria in Via Lata (ancient)
- San Martino ai Monti (ancient)
- San Nicola in Carcere (ancient)
- San Pancrazio (ancient)
- San Pietro in Vincoli (ancient)
- Santi Pietro e Paolo a Via Ostiense (1967)
- Santa Prassede all'Esquilino (ancient)
- Santa Pudenziana al Viminale (ancient)
- Santi Quattro Coronati al Laterano (ancient)
- San Saba (ancient)
- Santa Sabina all'Aventino (ancient)
- San Sebastiano fuori le mura (ancient)
- San Sisto Vecchio in Via Appia (ancient)
- Santa Sofia (1998)
- Santo Stefano Rotondo (ancient)
- Santa Teresa d'Avila (1951)
- Santi Vitale e Compagni Martiri in Fovea (ancient)

== Salerno – Campagna – Acerno ==
=== Campagna ===
- Co-Cathedral of Santa Maria della Pace (1925)

=== Salerno ===
- Cathedral of San Matteo (ancient)
- Basilica of St. Peter Alli Marmi (ancient)

== San Benedetto del Tronto – Ripatransone – Montalto ==
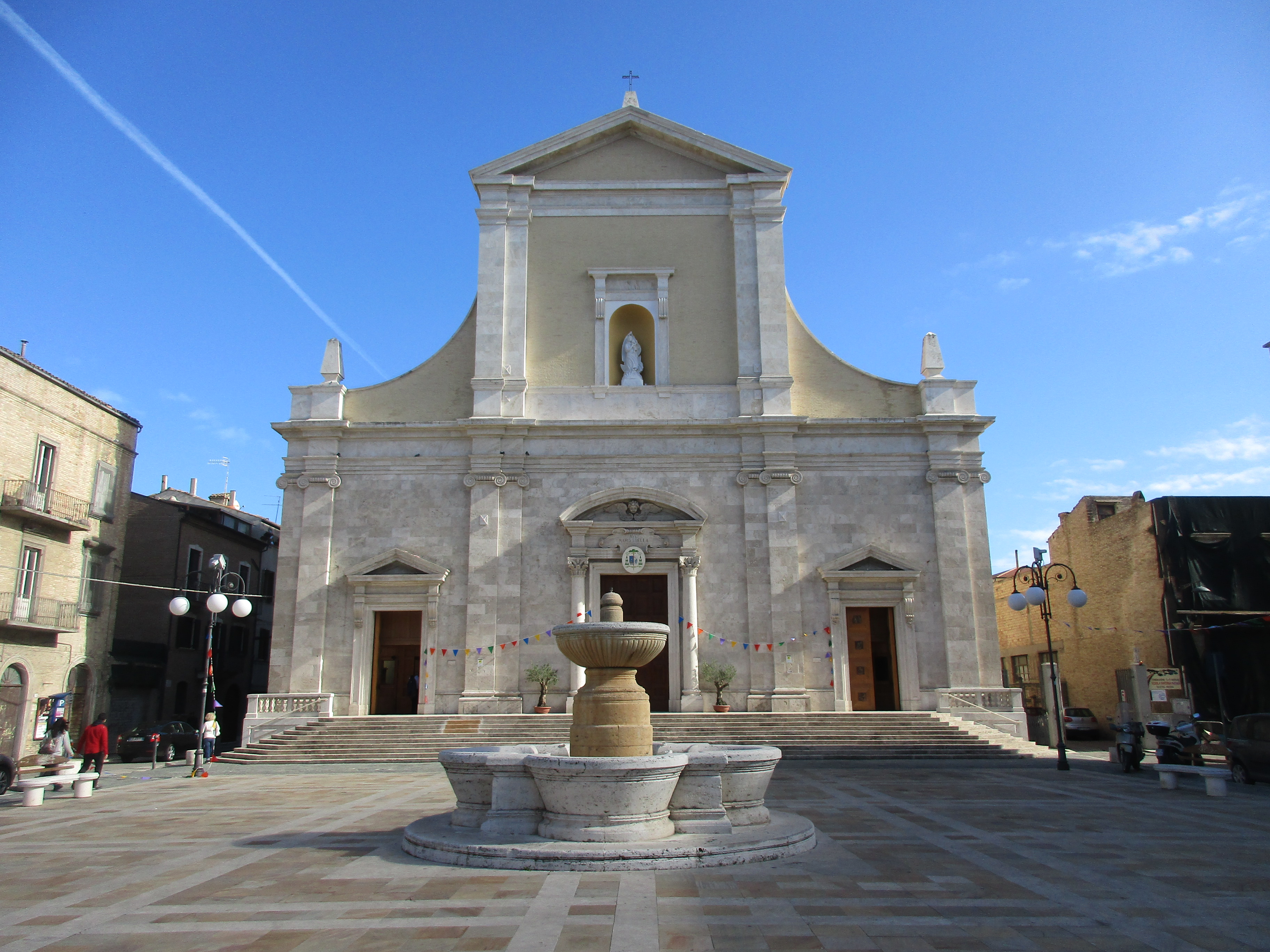
Santa Maria della Marina, San Benedetto del Tronto

=== Montalto delle Marche ===
- Co-Cathedral of Santa Maria Assunta (1965)

=== Ripatransone ===
- Co-Cathedral of San Gregorio Magno (1965)

=== San Benedetto del Tronto ===
- Cathedral of Santa Maria della Marina (2001)

== San Marco Argentano – Scalea ==
=== Diamante ===
- Immacolata Concezione (2025)

=== San Sosti ===
- Maria Santissima del Pettoruto (1979)

== Sant'Angelo dei Lombardi – Conza – Nusco – Bisaccia ==
=== Caposele ===
- Sanctuary of San Gerardo Maiella (1929)
- Santa Maria Assunta (1930)

== Sassari ==
=== Sassari ===
- Sacro Cuore (1980)

== Savona – Noli ==
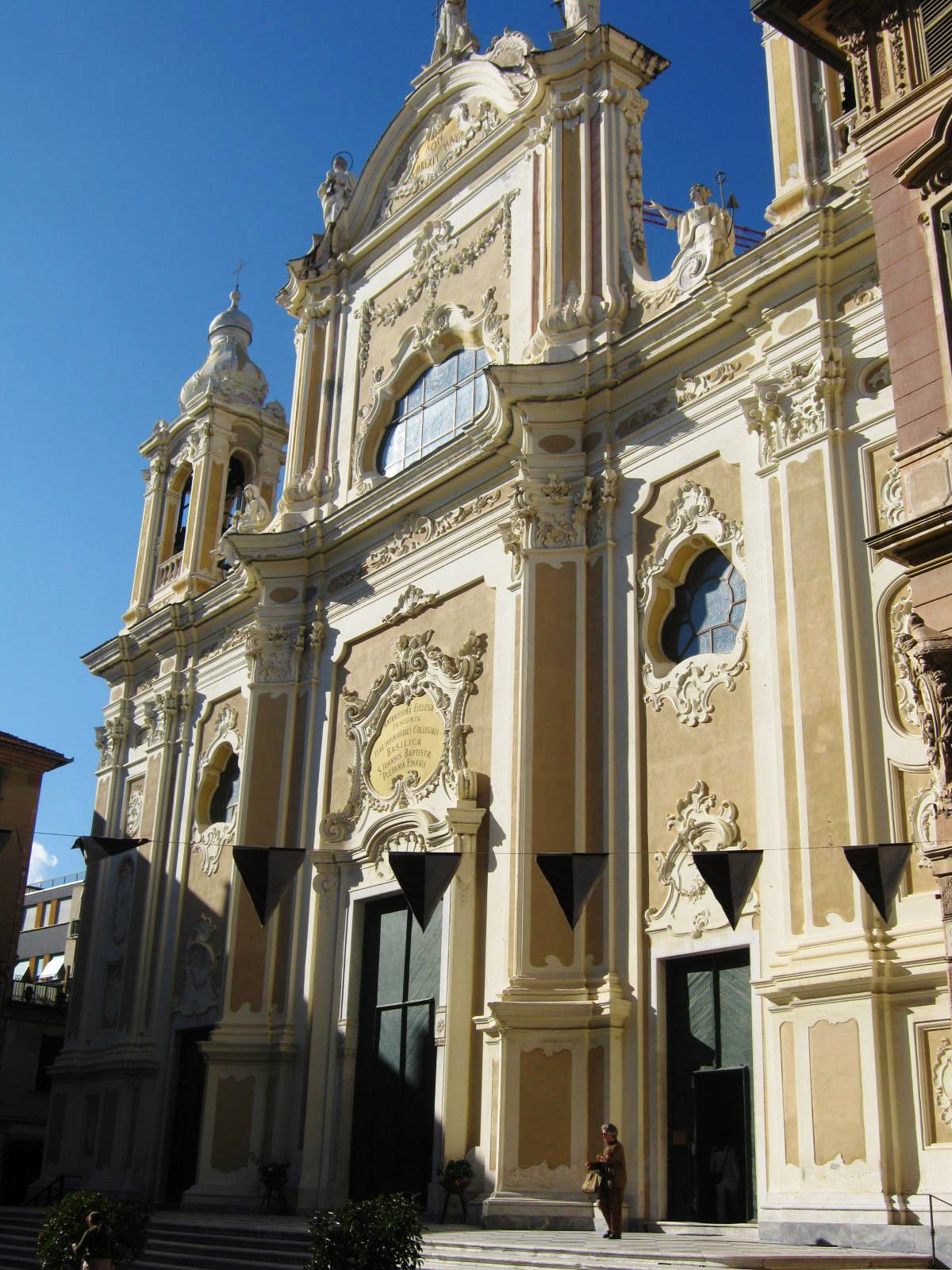
San Giovanni Battista, Finale Ligure

=== Finale Ligure ===
- San Biagio (1949)
- San Giovanni Battista (1930)

=== Savona ===
- Nostra Signora di Misericordia (1904)
- Cathedral of Santa Maria Assunta (1816)

== Senigallia ==
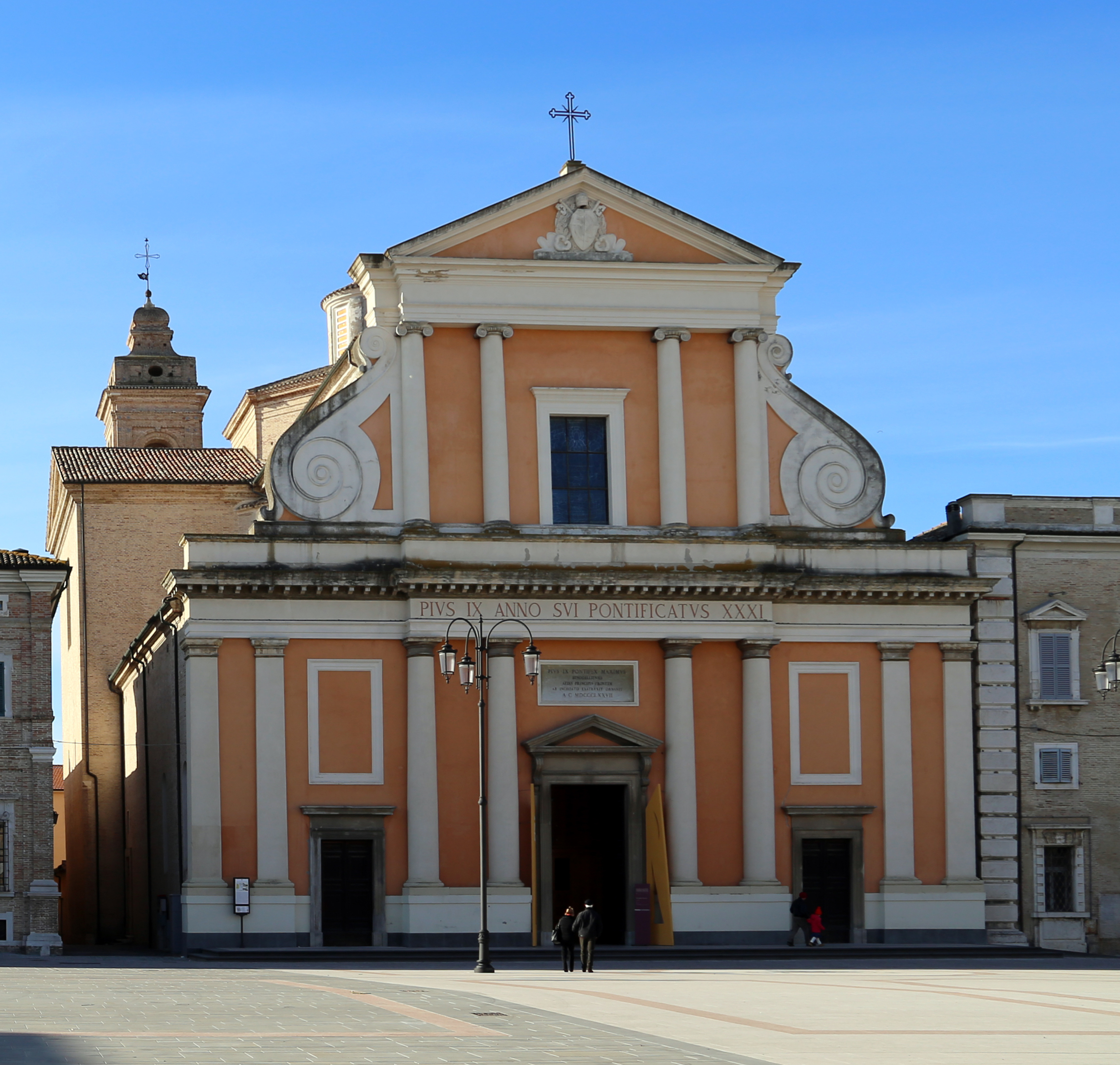
San Pietro, Senigallia

=== Senigallia ===
- Cathedral of San Pietro (1932)

== Sessa Aurunca ==
=== Sessa Aurunca ===
- Santi Pietro e Paolo (1929)

== Siena – Colle di Val d'Elsa – Montalcino ==
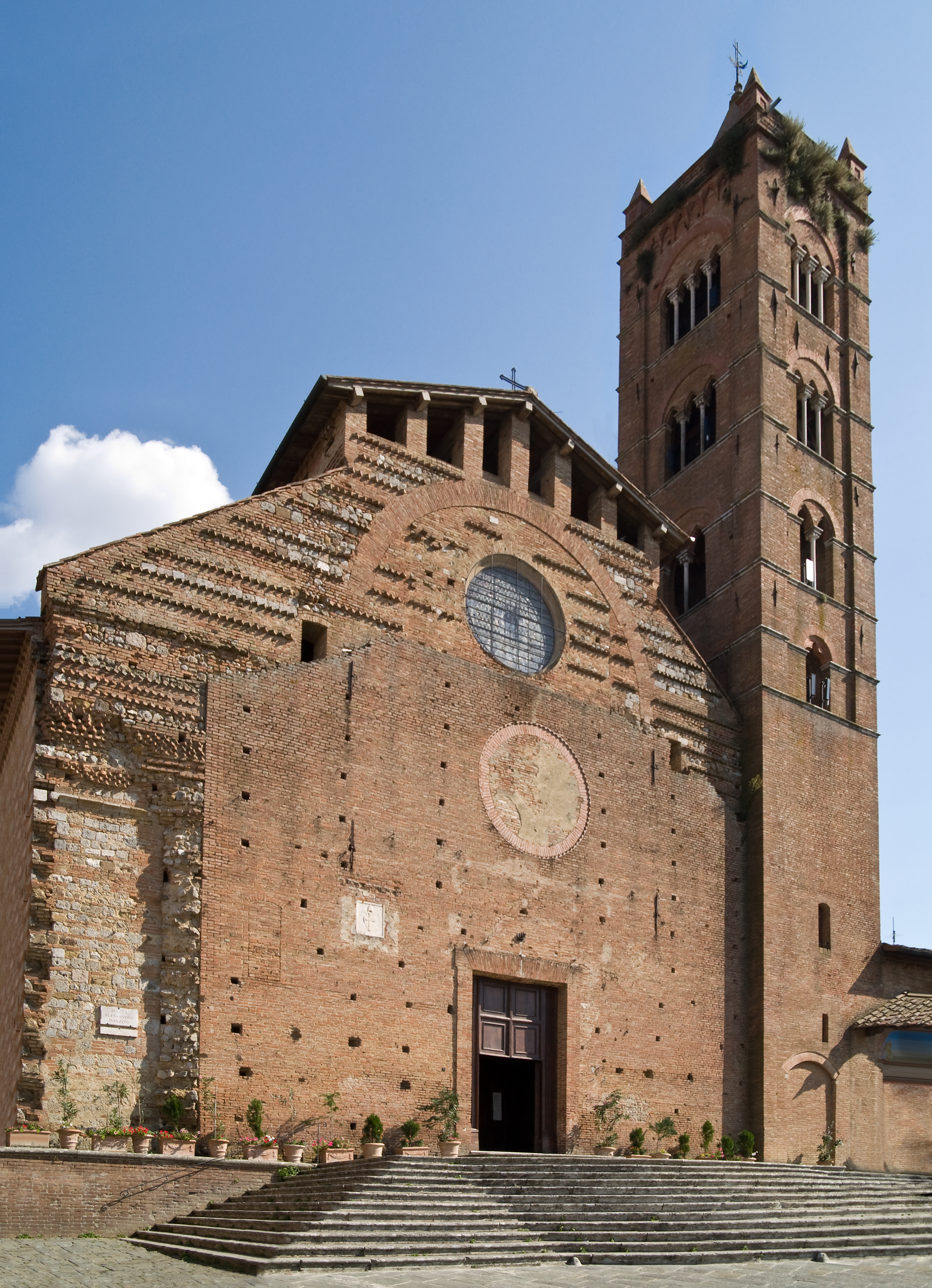
Santa Maria dei Servi, Siena

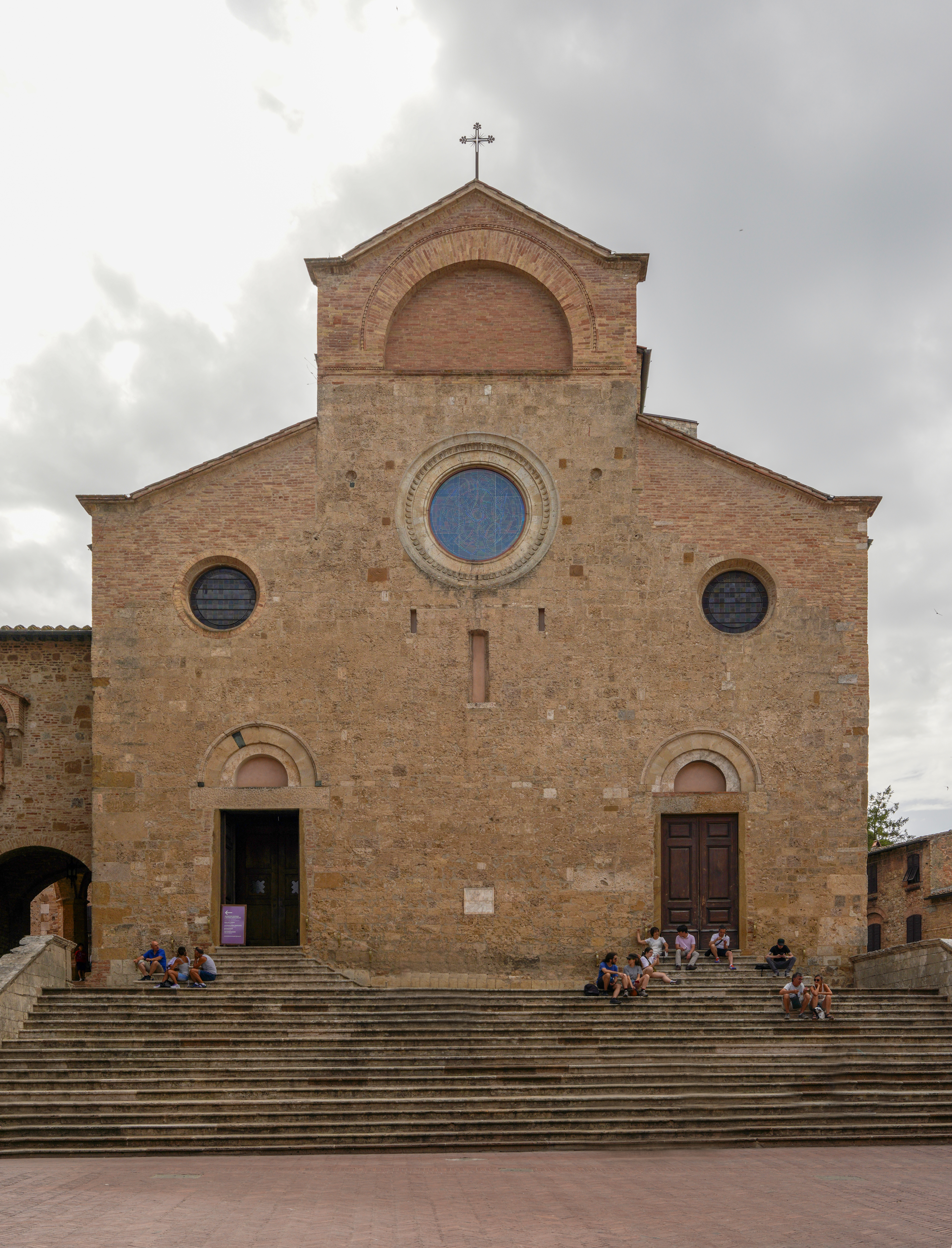
Santa Maria Assunta, San Gimignano

=== Asciano ===
- Sant'Agata (1991)

=== Poggibonsi ===
- San Lucchese (1938)

=== San Gimignano ===
- Santa Maria Assunta (1932)

=== Siena ===
- Basilica Cateriniana di San Domenico (1925)
- Basilica dell'Osservanza (1924)
- Santa Maria dei Servi (1908)

== Siracusa ==
=== Siracusa ===
- Basilica Santuario Madonna delle Lacrime (2002)

== Sora – Aquino – Pontecorvo ==
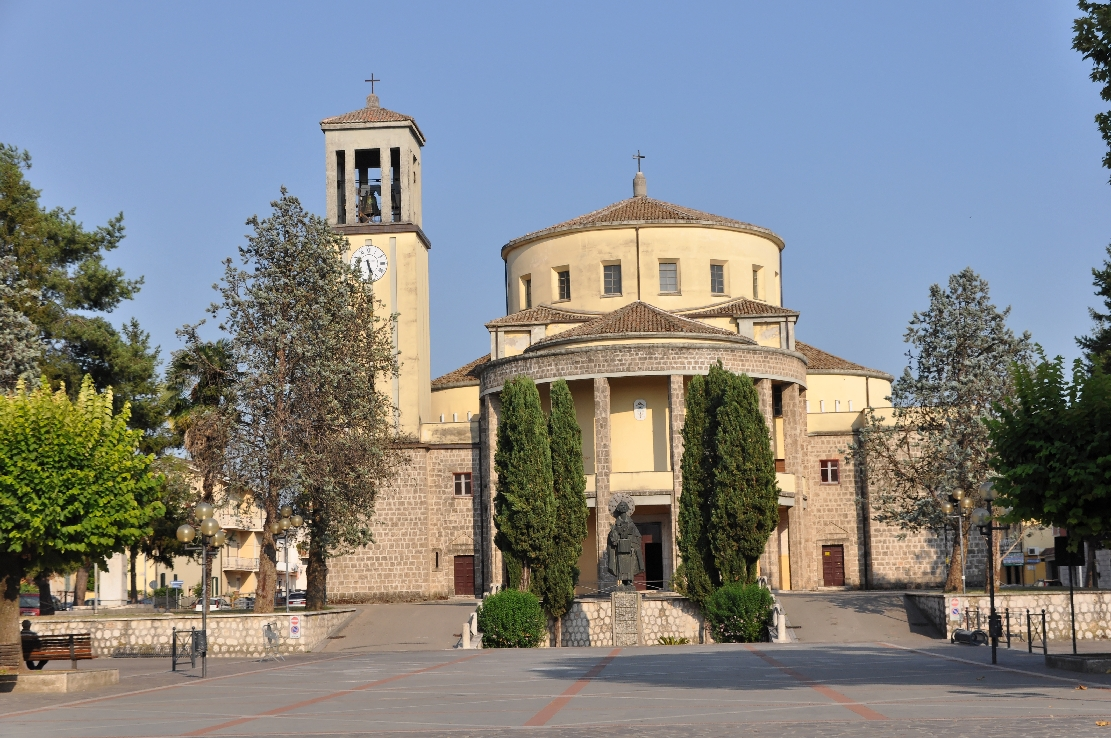
Santi Costanzo e Tommaso d'Aquino, Aquino

=== Aquino ===
- Co-Cathedral of Santi Costanzo e Tommaso d'Aquino (1974)

=== Pontecorvo ===
- Co-Cathedral of San Bartolomeo (1958)

=== Settefrati ===
- Basilica Santuario Maria Santissima di Canneto (2015)

== Sorrento – Castellammare di Stabia ==
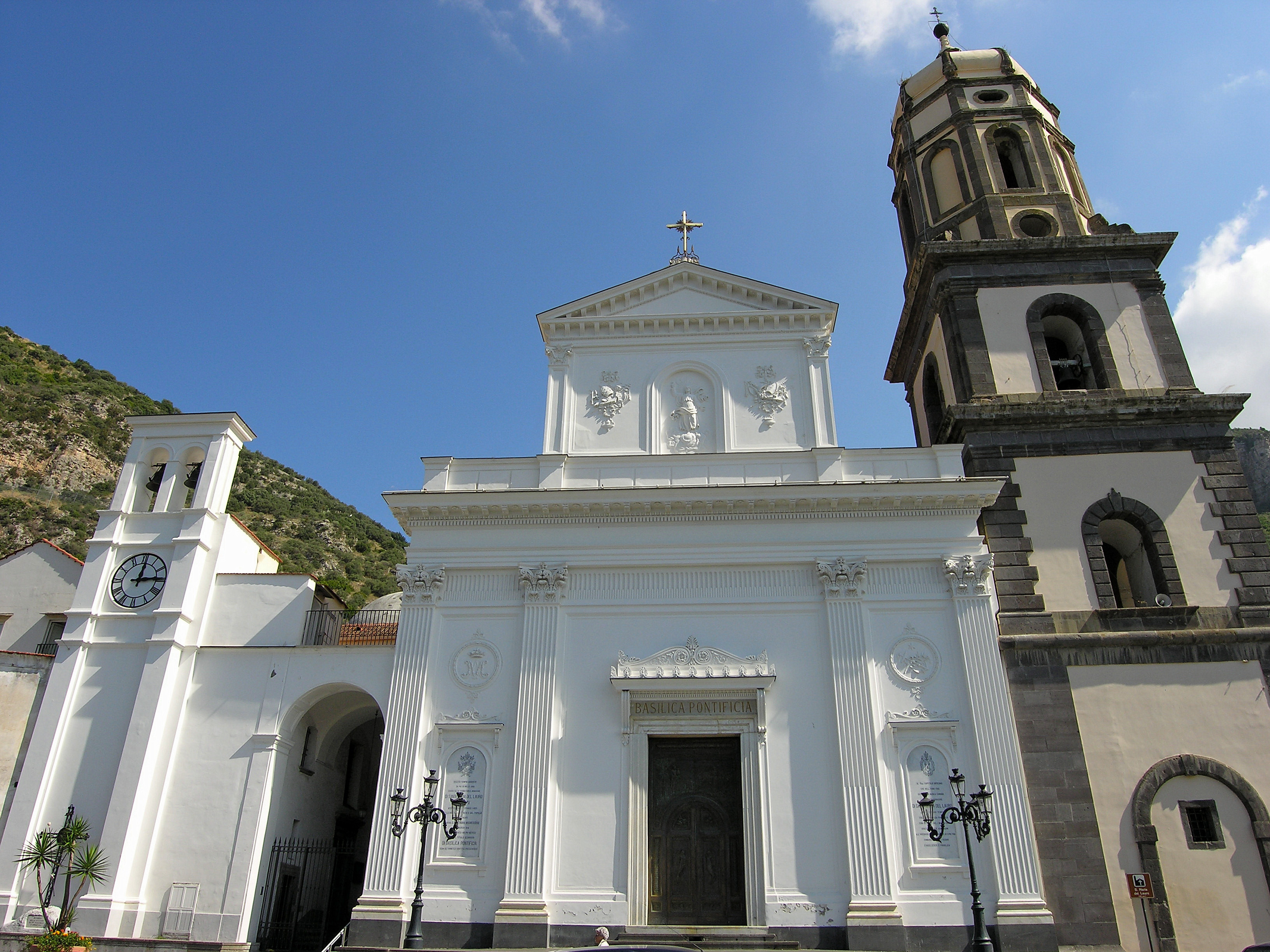
Santa Maria del Lauro, Meta

=== Castellammare di Stabia ===
- Santa Maria di Pozzano (1916)

=== Meta ===
- Santa Maria del Lauro (1914)

=== Piano di Sorrento ===
- San Michele (1914)

=== Sorrento ===
- Sant'Antonino Abate (1924)

== Spoleto – Norcia ==
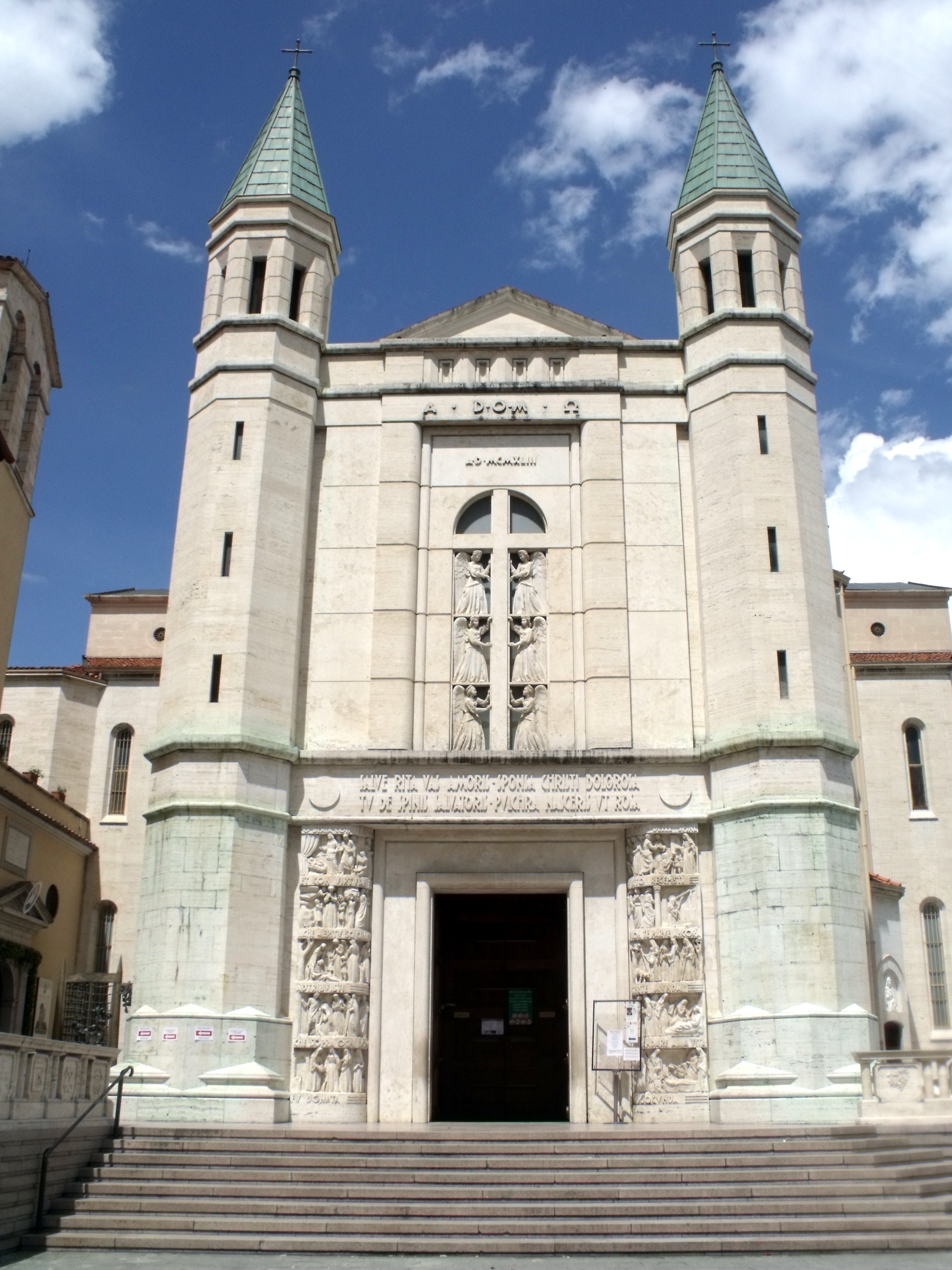
Santa Rita da Cascia, Cascia

=== Cascia ===
- Santa Rita da Cascia (1955)

=== Norcia ===
- San Benedetto (1966; destroyed 2016)

== Subiaco ==
=== Subiaco ===
- Co-Cathedral of Sant'Andrea (1952)
- Cathedral of Santa Scolastica (ancient)

== Sulmona – Valva ==
=== Sulmona ===
- Cathedral of San Panfilo (1818)

== Taranto ==
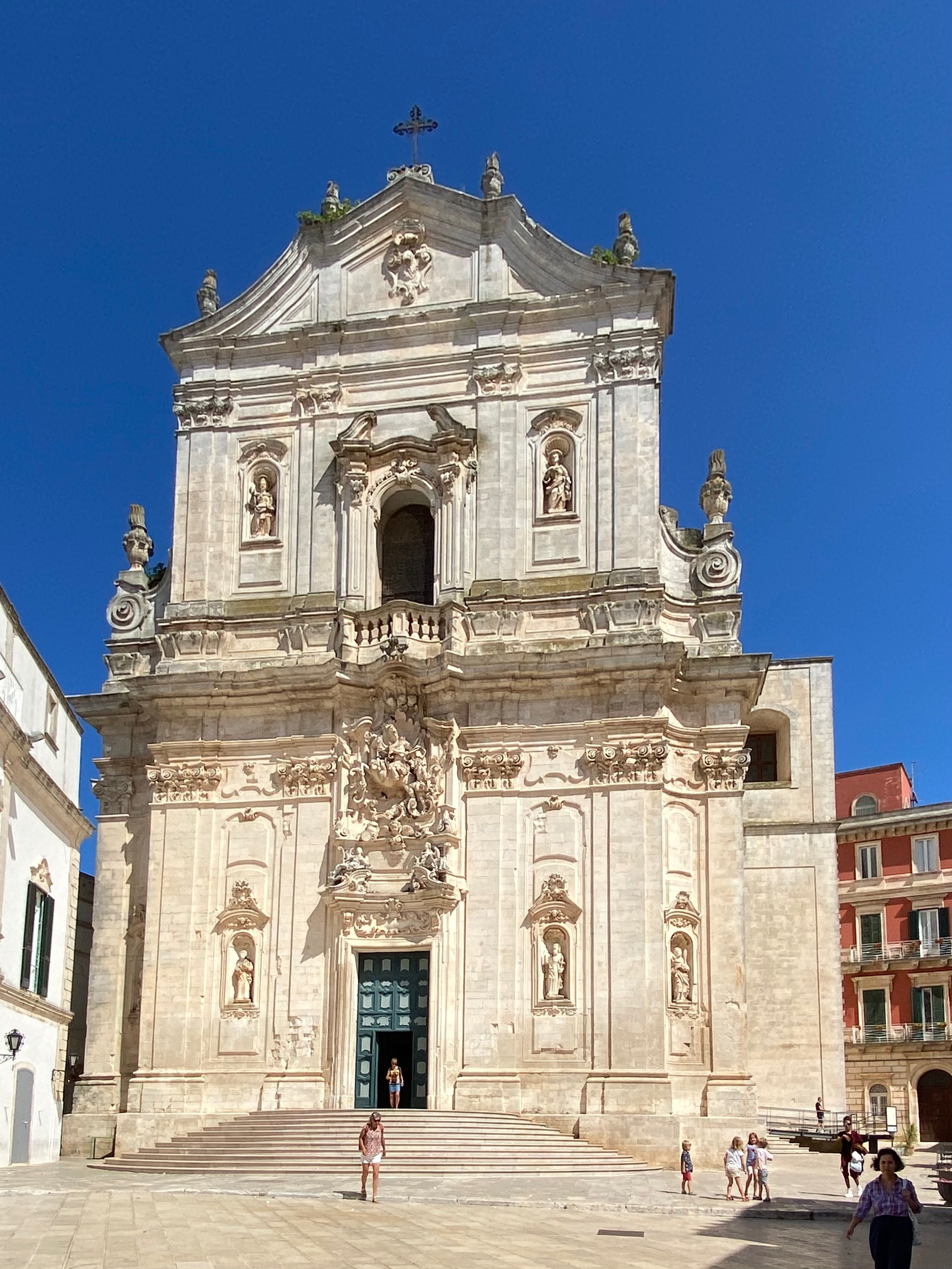
San Martino, Martina Franca

=== Martina Franca ===
- San Martino (1998)

=== Taranto ===
- Cathedral of San Cataldo (1964)

== Teano – Calvi ==
=== Roccamonfina ===
- Santuario Maria Santi dei Lattani (1970)

== Teggiano – Policastro ==
=== Latronico ===
- San Egidio (1971)

=== Maratea ===
- San Biagio (1940)

== Tempio – Ampurias ==
=== Olbia ===
- San Simplicio (1993)

== Teramo – Atri ==
=== Atri ===
- Co-Cathedral of Santa Maria Assunta (1964)

=== Isola del Gran Sasso ===
- Santuario di San Gabriele dell'Addolorata (1929)

=== Teramo ===
- Cathedral of Santa Maria Assunta (1955)

== Termoli – Larino ==
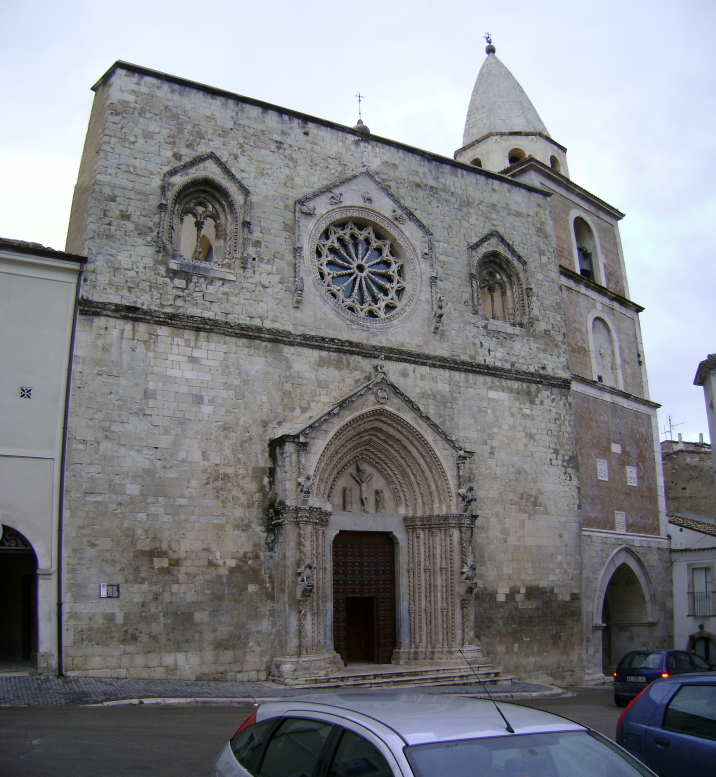
Santa Maria Assunta, Larino

=== Larino ===
- Co-Cathedral of Santa Maria Assunta (1928)

=== Termoli ===
- Cathedral of Santi Basso e Timoteo (1947)

== Tortona ==
=== Broni ===
- San Pietro (1953)

=== Tortona ===
- Madonna della Guardia (1991)

== Trani – Barletta – Bisceglie ==
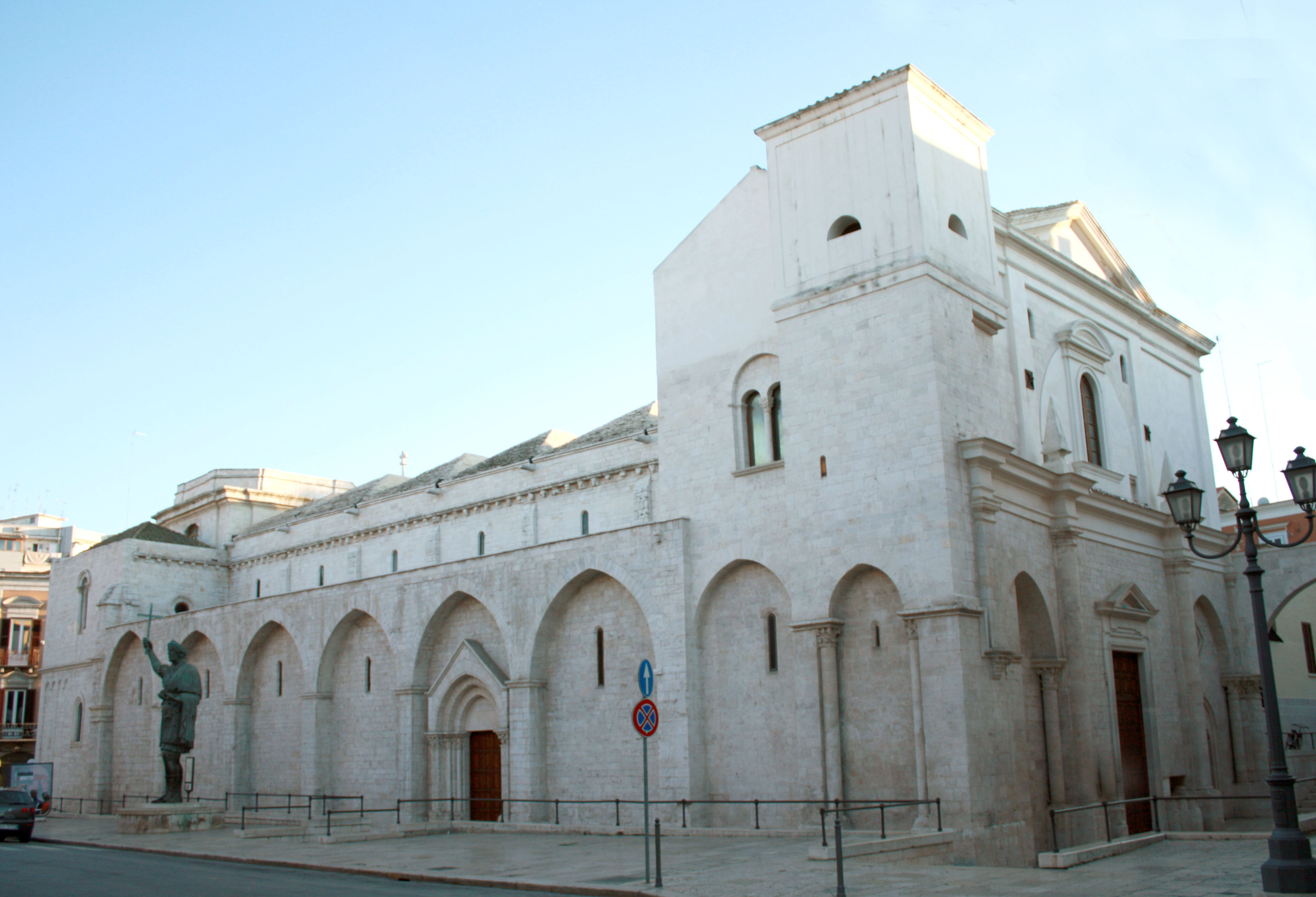
San Sepolcro, Barletta

=== Barletta ===
- Co-Cathedral of Santa Maria Assunta (1961)
- San Sepolcro (1951)

=== Bisceglie ===
- Co-Cathedral of San Pietro Apostolo (1980)

=== Trani ===
- Cathedral of Santa Maria Assunta (1960)

== Trapani ==
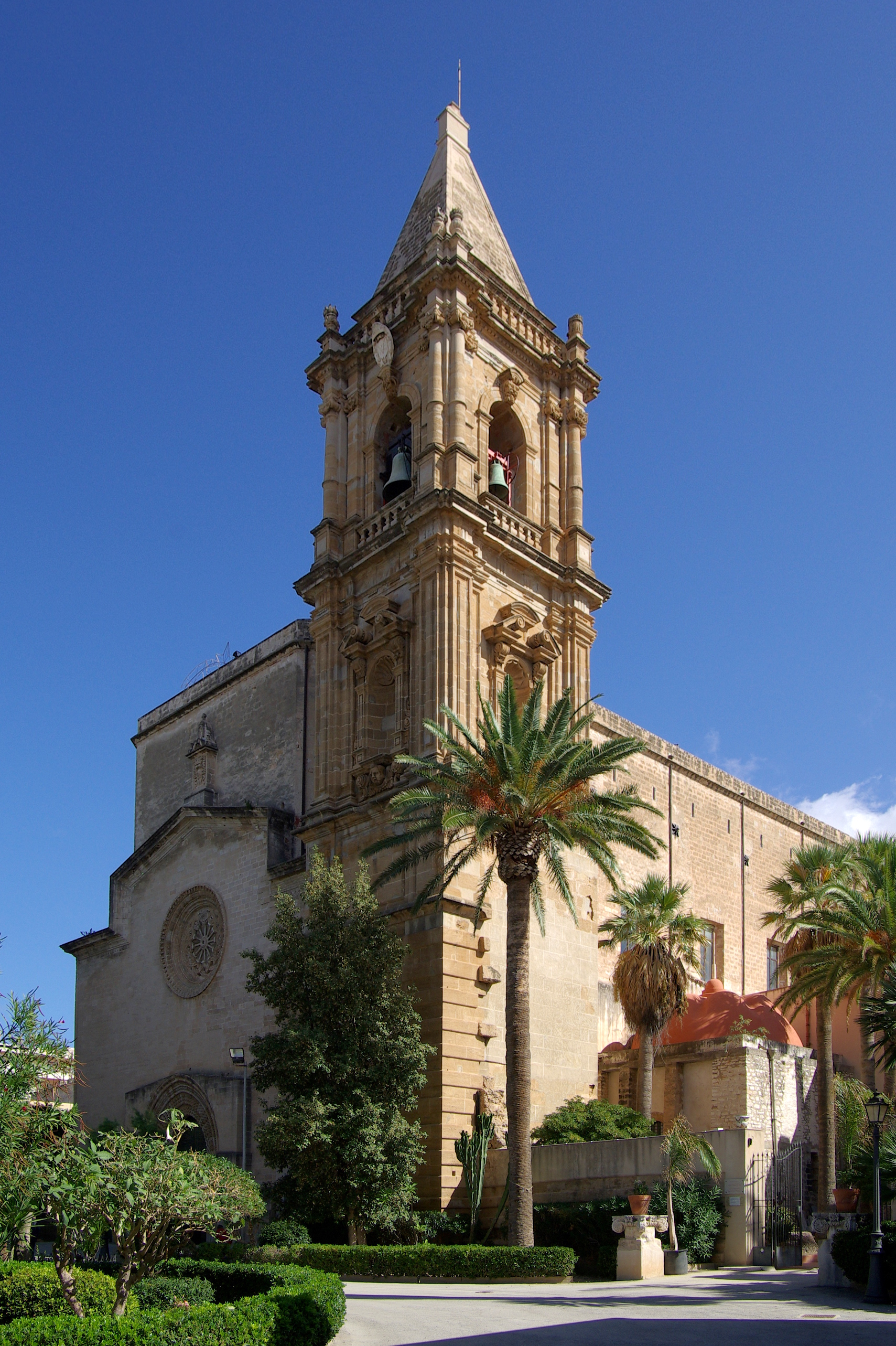
Santa Maria Annunziata, Trapani

=== Alcamo ===
- Santa Maria Assunta (1969)

=== Trapani ===
- Cathedral of San Lorenzo (ancient)
- Santa Maria Annunziata (1950)
- San Nicola (ancient)
- San Pietro (ancient)

== Trento ==
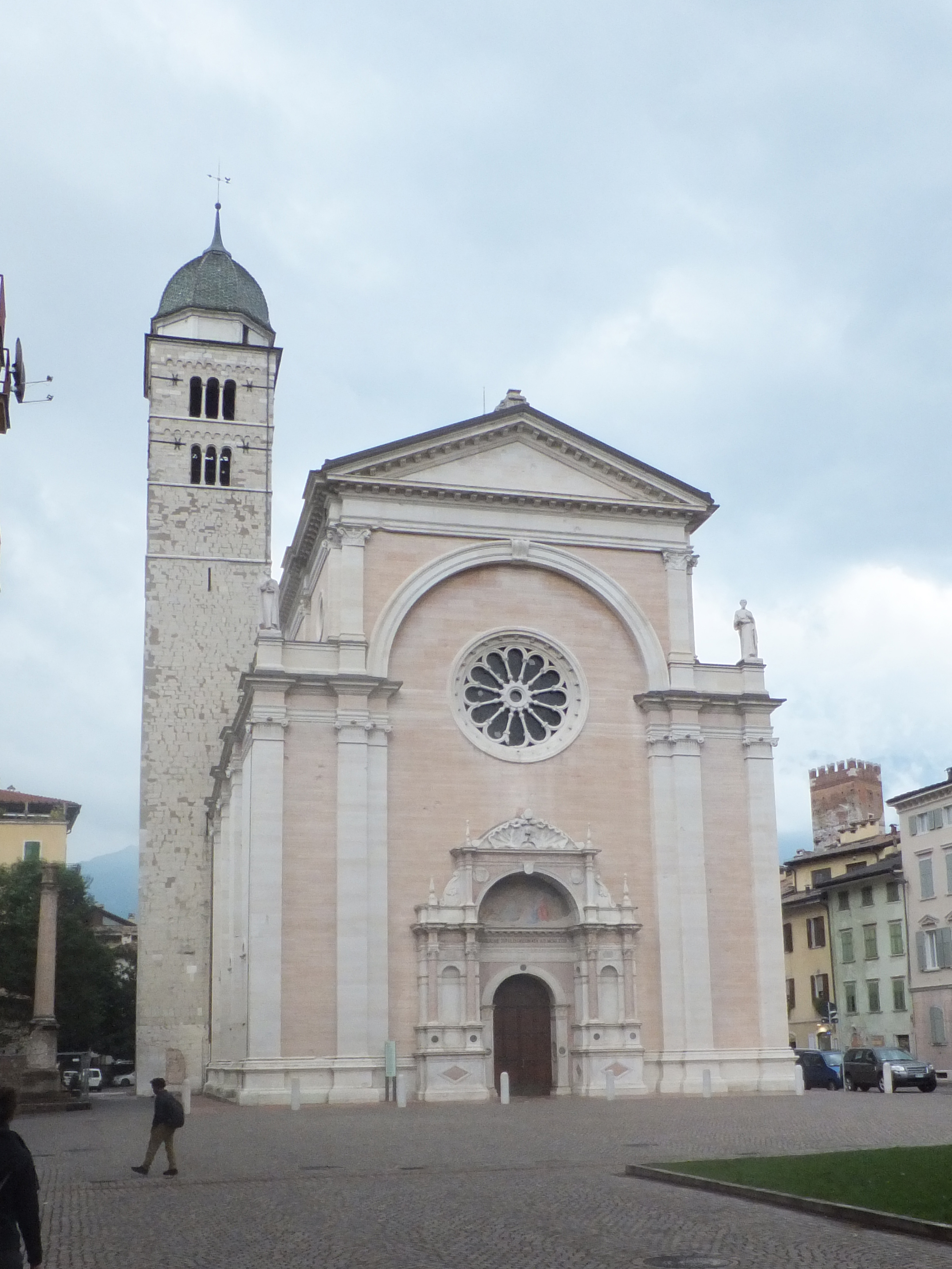
Santa Maria Maggiore, Trento

=== Sanzeno ===
- Santi Sisinio, Martirio e Alessandro (1973)

=== Trento ===
- Santa Maria Maggiore (1973)
- Cathedral of San Vigilio (1913)

== Treviso ==
=== Treviso ===
- La Madonna Grande (1917)

== Trieste ==
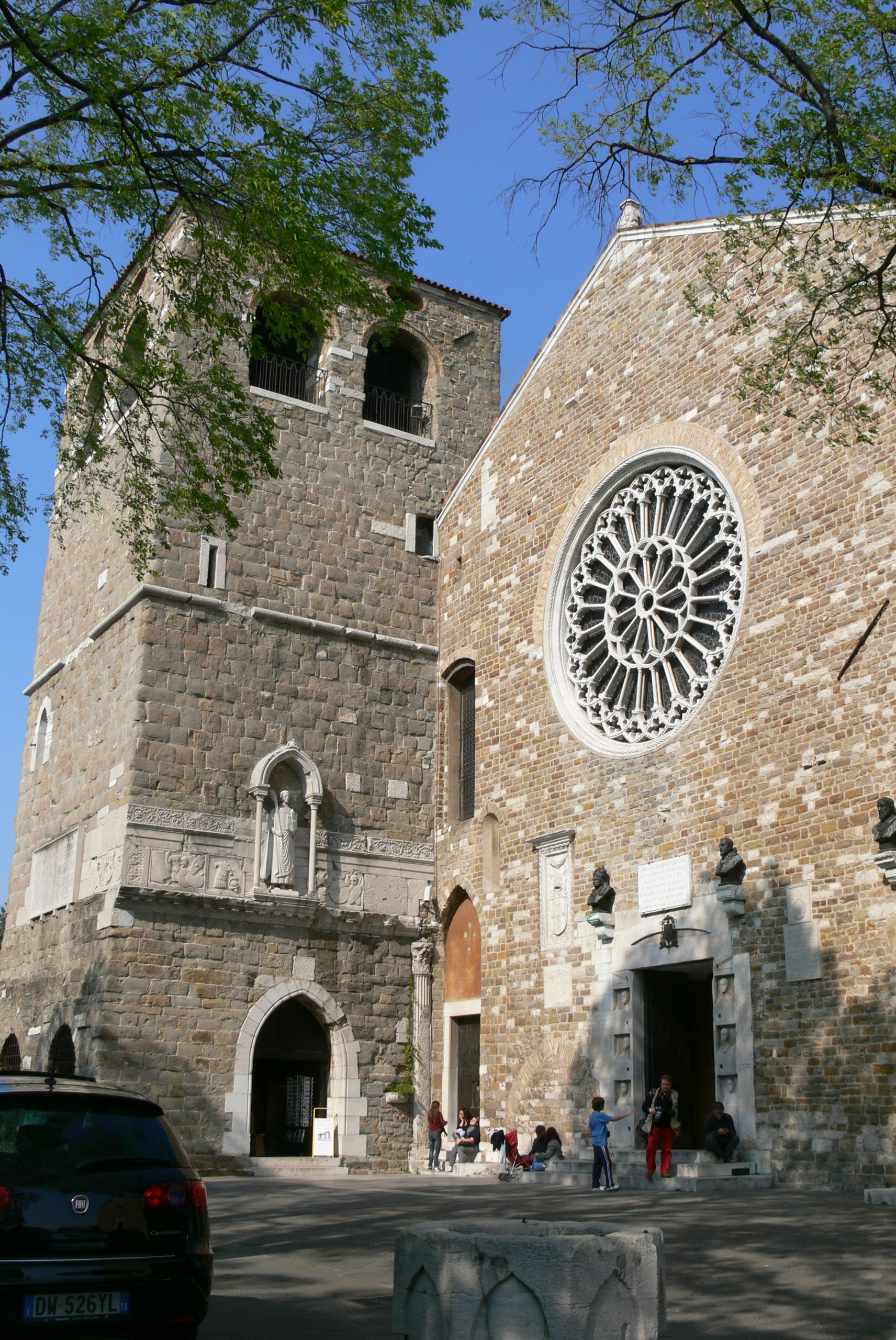
San Giusto, Trieste

=== Trieste ===
- Cathedral of San Giusto (1899)

== Turin ==
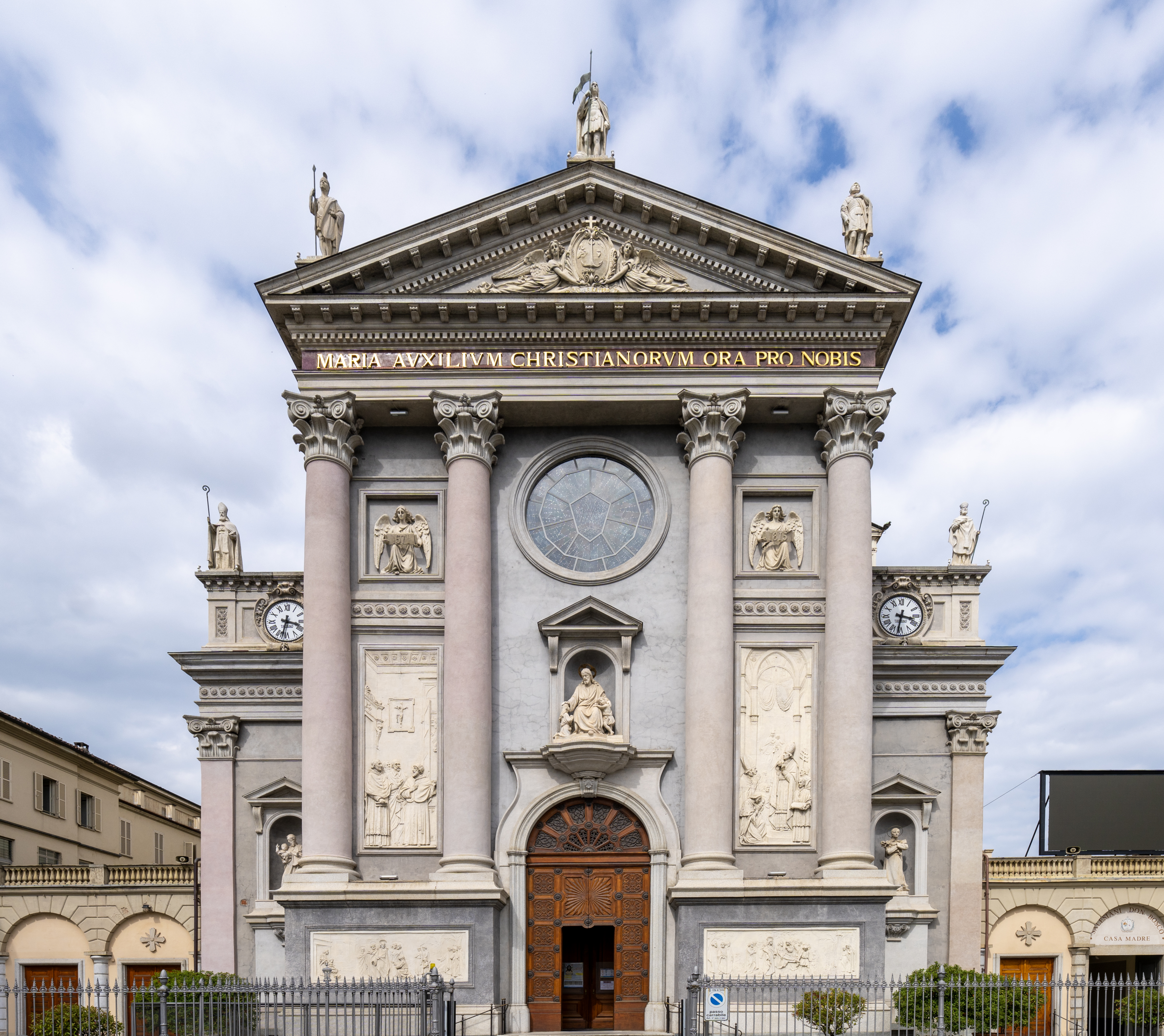
Santa Maria Ausiliatrice, Turin

=== Castelnuovo Don Bosco ===
- Basilica di Don Bosco (2010)

=== Turin ===
- Basilica of Corpus Domini (1928)
- Santuario della Consolata (1906)
- Basilica di Santa Maria Ausiliatrice (1911)

== Tursi – Lagonegro ==
=== Tursi ===
- Basilica Santuario Santa Maria d'Anglona Della Natività di Maria (1999)

== Udine ==
=== Cividale del Friuli ===
- Santa Maria Assunta di Cividale del Friuli (1909)

=== Udine ===
- Santa Maria della Grazie (1921)

== Ugento – Santa Maria di Leuca ==
=== Castrignano del Capo ===
- Santa Maria di Santa Maria di Leuca (1990)

== Urbino – Urbania – Sant'Angelo in Vado ==
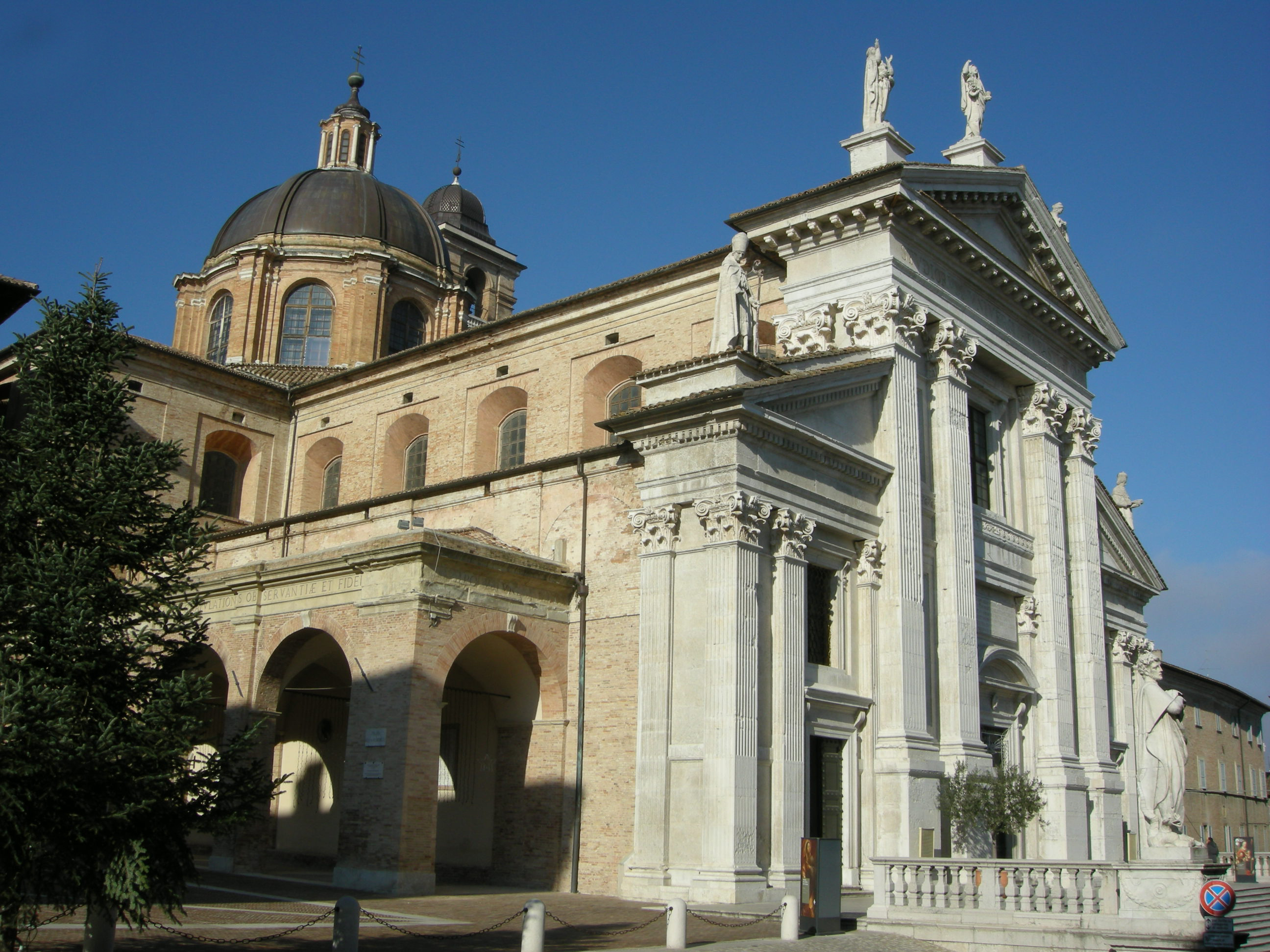
Santa Maria Assunta, Urbino

=== Sant'Angelo in Vado ===
- Co-Cathedral of San Michele Arcangelo (1947)

=== Urbino ===
- Cathedral of Santa Maria Assunta (1950)

== Vallo della Lucania ==
=== Castellabate ===
- Santa Maria de Gulia (1988)

== Velletri – Segni ==
=== Velletri ===
- Cathedral of San Clemente I (1784)

== Venice ==
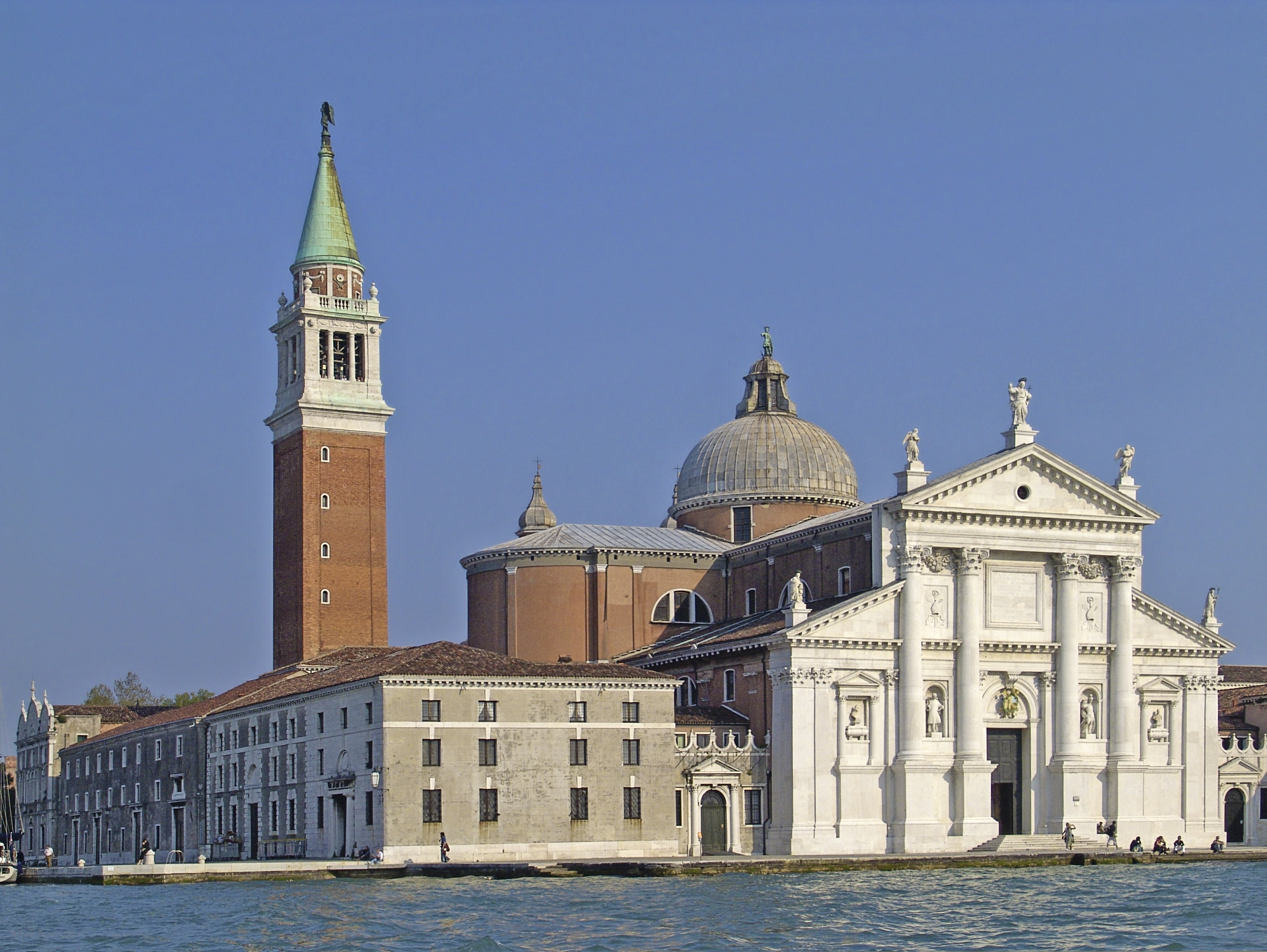
San Giorgio Maggiore, Venice

=== Venice ===
- San Giorgio Maggiore (1900)
- Cathedral of San Marco (ancient)
- Santa Maria Assunta di Torcello (ancient)
- Santa Maria Gloriosa dei Frari (1926)
- Santa Maria della Salute (1921)
- Santi Maria e San Donato di Murano (ancient)
- San Pietro di Castello (ancient)
- San Zanipolo (SS. Giovanni e Paolo) (1922)

== Ventimiglia – San Remo ==
=== Sanremo ===
- Sacro Cuore di Gesù di Bussana Nuova (1939)
- San Siro (1947)

=== Taggia ===
- Santi Giacomo e Filippo e Cuore Immacolato di Maria (1942)

== Vercelli ==
Sant'Andrea, Vercelli

=== Vercelli ===
- Sant'Andrea (ancient)
- Cathedral of San Eusebio (1834)
- Santi Trinità e Maria Maggiore (ancient)

== Verona ==
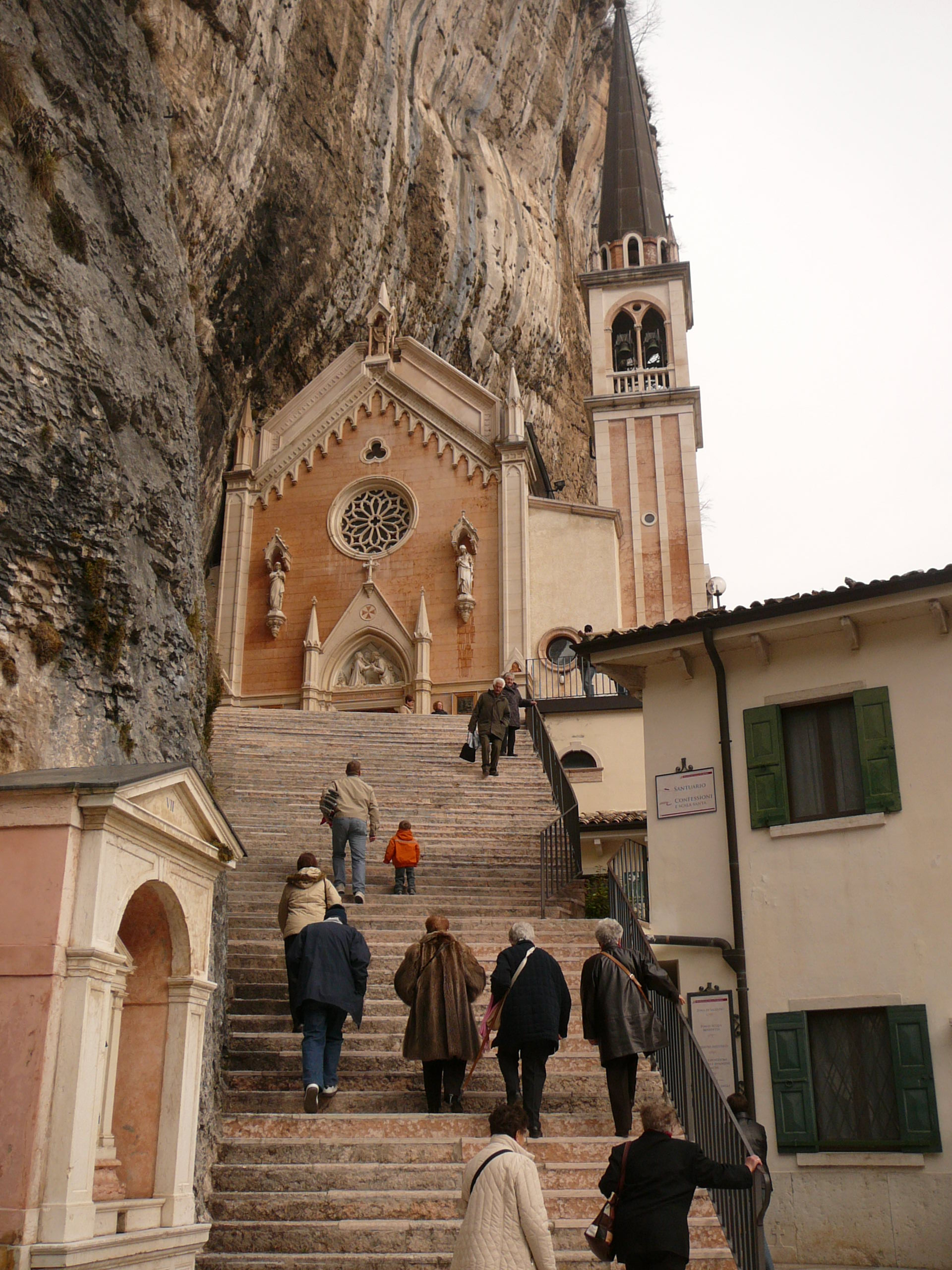
Madonna della Corona, Caprino Veronese

=== Caprino Veronese ===
- Madonna della Corona (1982)

=== Lonato del Garda ===
- San Giovanni Battista (1980)

=== Verona ===
- Madonna di Campagna (1986)
- Santa Teresa di Gesù Bambino in Tombetta (1938)
- San Zeno (1973)

== Vicenza ==
=== Vicenza ===
- Monte Berico (1904)

== Vigevano ==
=== Mortara ===
- San Lorenzo (1939)

== Viterbo ==
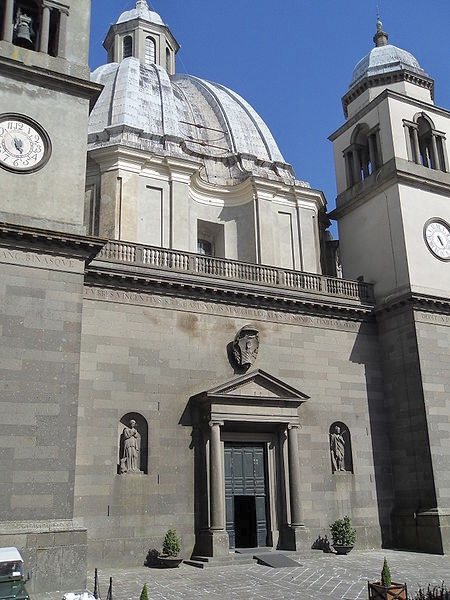
Santa Margherita d'Antiochia, Montefiascone

=== Acquapendente ===
- Co-Cathedral of San Sepolcro (ancient)

=== Grotte di Castro ===
- Santa Maria del Suffragio (1967)

=== Montefiascone ===
- San Flaviano (ancient)
- Pro-Cathedral of Santa Margherita d'Antiochia (1943)

=== Orte ===
- Santa Maria Assunta (ancient)

=== Viterbo ===
- San Francesco d'Assisi (1949)
- Cathedral of San Lorenzo (1940)
- Santa Maria della Quercia (1867)

== Vittorio Veneto ==
=== Follina ===
- Santa Maria Annunciata (1921)

=== Motta di Livenza ===
- Madonna dei Miracoli (1875)

== Volterra ==
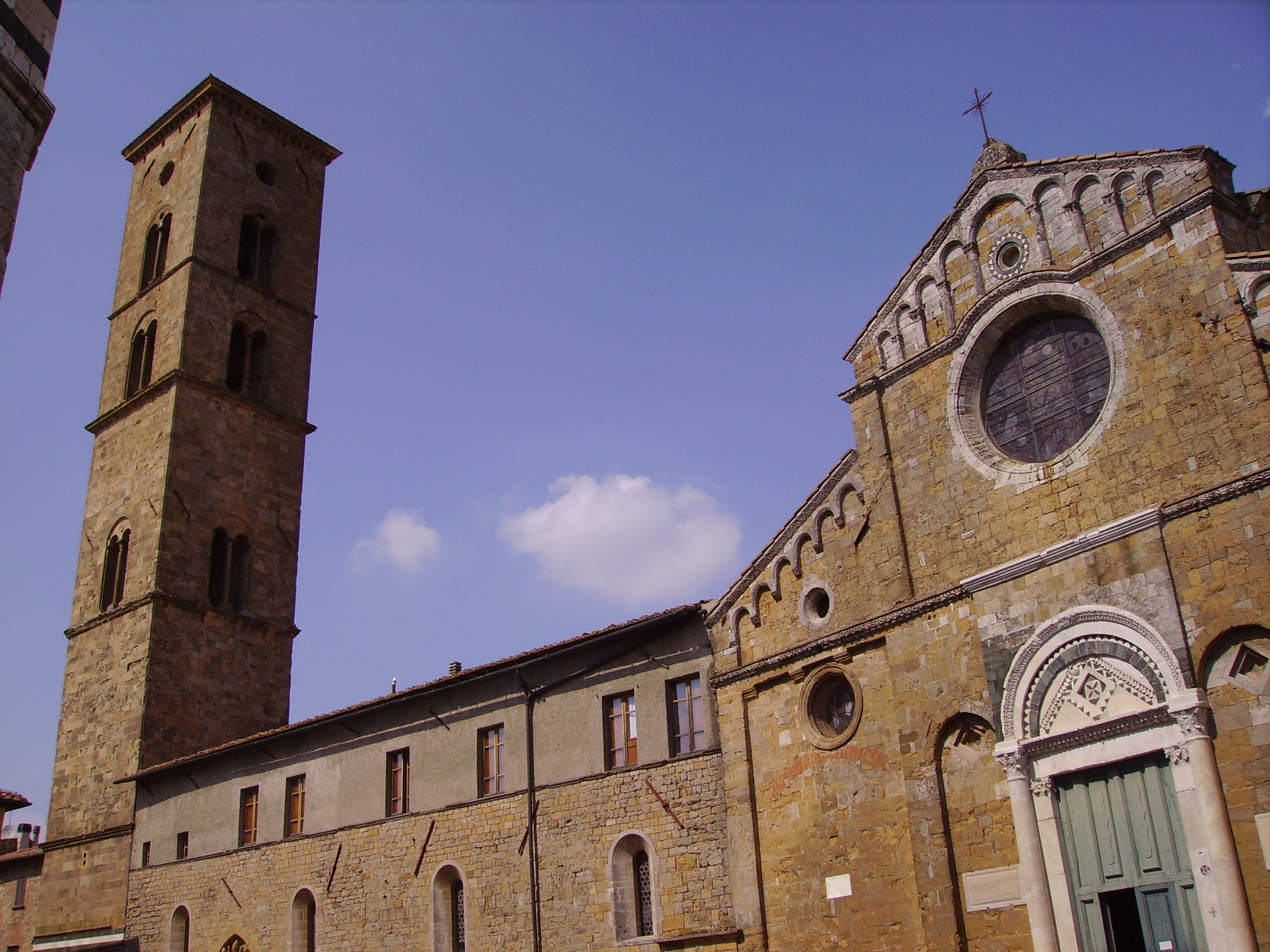
Santa Maria Assunta, Volterra

=== Volterra ===
- Cathedral of Santa Maria Assunta (1957)

== See also ==
- List of basilicas
- List of cathedrals
- Roman Catholic Church
