= Château de Lagery =

Castle in Grand Est, France

Coordinates: 49°12′37″N 3°44′45″E

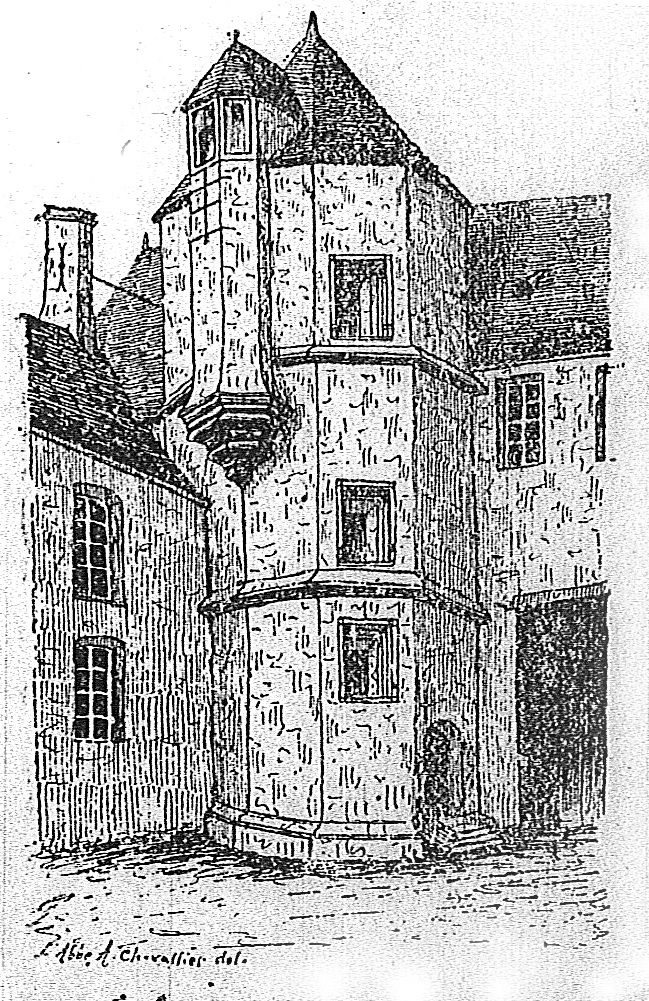
Renaissance staircase

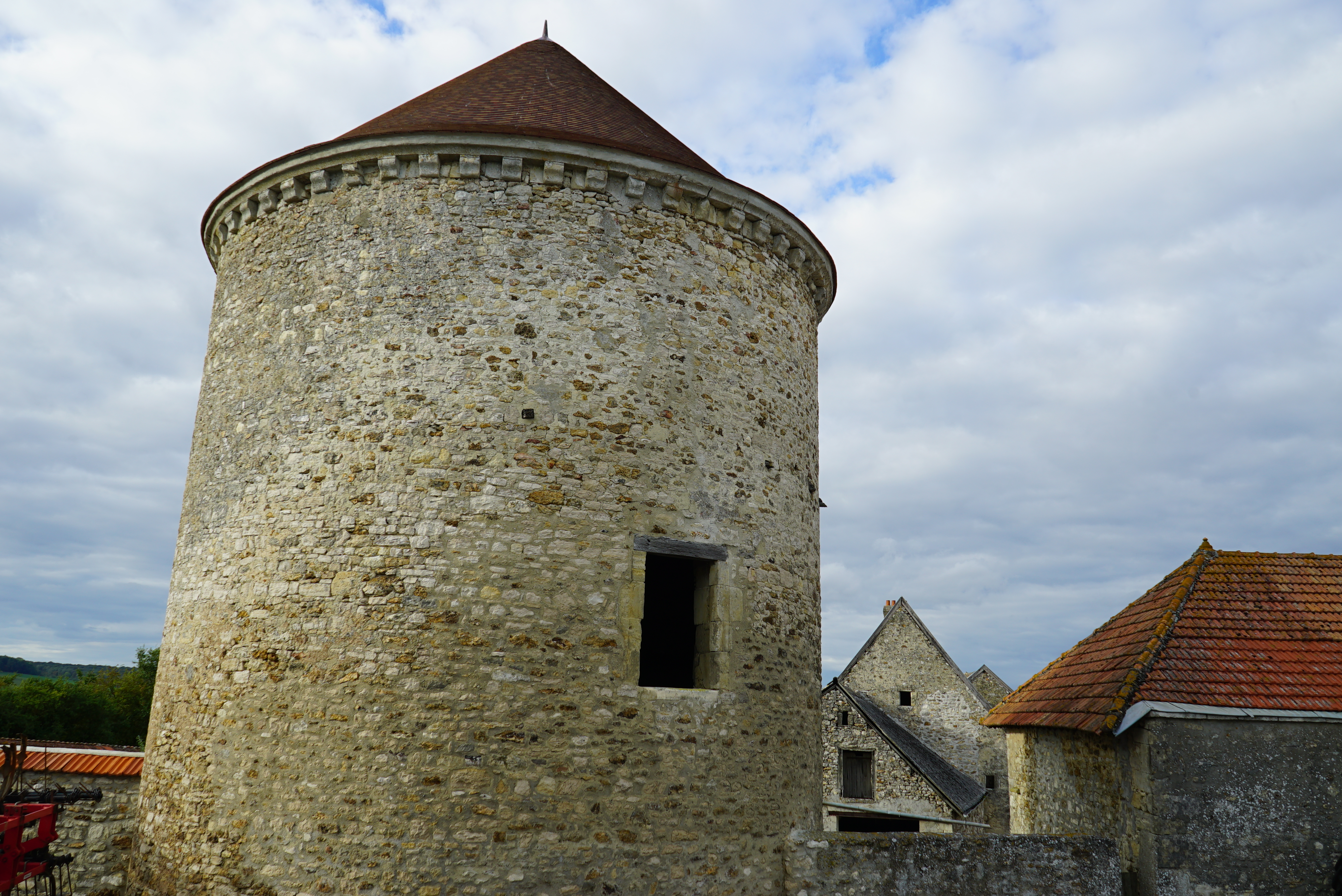
13th century tower

The Château de Lagery is a 12th to 16th century castle in the Lagery commune in the Marne département of France.

== History ==
Of the original castle, all that remains is a tower, at one time known as the Prison Tower, and in the 19th century used for sheep. In the 16th or 17th century, the castle was rebuilt in the Renaissance style.

Pope Urban II was born in the castle in 1042.

== Description ==
The castle overhangs the village slightly and forms a square protecting a central courtyard. The western wing, the oldest, forms the gatehouse which consists of a carriage entrance and a pedestrian door and leads to the 13th-century tower. The northern wing which adjoins the church is the dwelling part which is attached to the east wing by a 16th-century inside tower.

As was the custom, the castle is connected to the church by a tunnel; a private door opens into the cemetery and the church has a seigniorial chapel. The Church of St. Martin of Lagery has a tombstone of the former lords, a litre funéraire and painted blazons.

The 12th-century tower, the entrance gateway, façades and roofs of the gallery house have been listed as monuments historiques since 1922 by the French Ministry of Culture.

== See also ==
- List of castles in France
