= Lagery =

- Commune
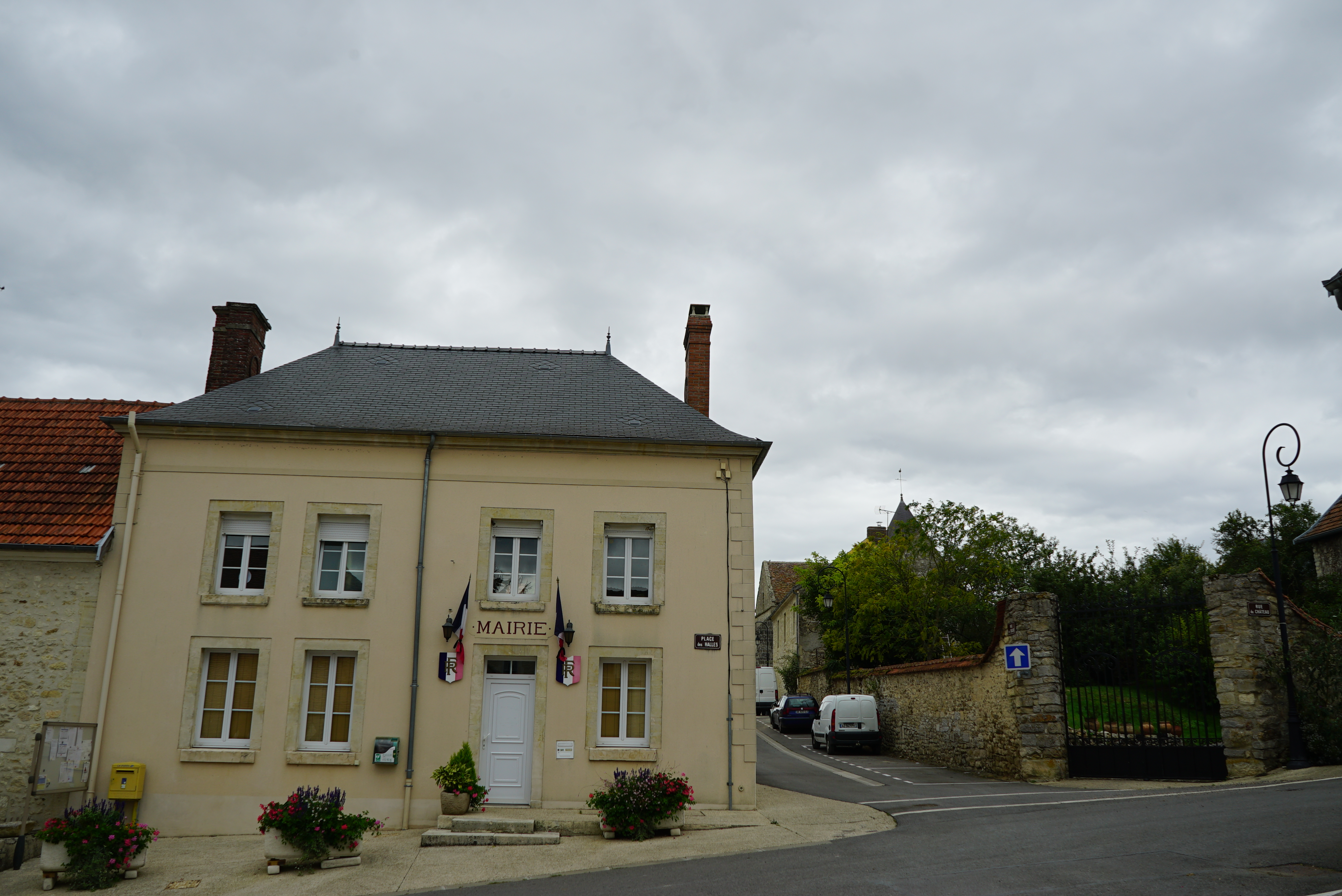
- The town hall in Lagery
- Location of Lagery
- Location within France Location within Grand Est
- Coordinates: 49°12′37″N 3°44′45″E
- Country: France
- Region: Grand Est
- Department: Marne
- Arrondissement: Reims
- Canton: Dormans-Paysages de Champagne
- Intercommunality: CU Grand Reims

Government
  - Mayor (2020–2026): Régis Franque
- Area^{1}: 9.34 km^{2} (3.61 sq mi)
- Elevation: 171 m (561 ft)
- Population (2023): 234
  - Density: 25.1/km^{2} (64.9/sq mi)
- Time zone: UTC+01:00 (CET)
  - Summer (DST): UTC+02:00 (CEST)
- INSEE/Postal code: 51314 /51170
- ^{1} French Land Register data, which excludes lakes, ponds, glaciers > 1 km^{2} (0.386 sq mi or 247 acres) and river estuaries.

Lagery is a commune in the Marne department in north-eastern France.

Pope Urban II was born in the Château de Lagery in 1042.

== See also ==
- Communes of the Marne department
