= Cardinals created by Urban II =

Catholic appointments from 1088 to 1099

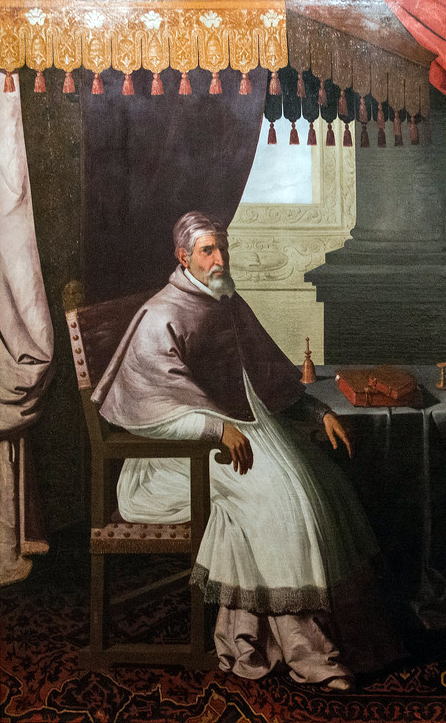
Pope Urban II.

Pope Urban II (r. 1088–1099) created 71 cardinals in ten consistories that he held throughout his pontificate. He elevated his two successors Gelasius II and Innocent II as cardinals in 1088 and Honorius II in 1099.

== 1088 ==
- Domnizzone
- Odon de Châtillon O.S.B. Cluny.
- Pietro Senex, Cardinal-bishop of Porto
- Amico O.S.B. seniore
- Giovanni
- Gregorio
- Gianroberto Capizucchi
- Robert of Paris
- Bone seniore
- Riso
- Leone
- Gregorio Paparoni
- Alberico
- Gregorio
- Paolo Gentili
- Benedetto
- Landolfo Rangone
- Giovanni da Gaeta O.S.B. Cas.
- Gregorio O.S.B.
- Gregorio
- Gregorio Papareschi Can. Reg. Lat. seniore
- Raniero
- Cosma
- Giovanni O.S.B.
- Pagano
- Leo of Ostia O.S.B. Monte Cassino
- Azone

== 1090 ==
- Ubaldo
- Bovo
- Oddone
- Giovanni

== 1091 ==
- Gualterio, Cardinal-bishop of the Diocese of Albano
- Rangier O.S.B.

== 1092 ==
- Berardo
- Bruno

== 1093 ==
- Giovanni Minuto

== 1094 ==
- Theodoric
- Geoffroy O.S.B.
- Alberto

== 1095 ==
- Maurizio
- Anastasio
- Buonsignore
- Dietrich
- Hermann
- Hugues
- Rogero

== 1097 ==
- Raniero
- St. Bernardo degli Uberti O.S.B. Vall.

== 1098 ==
- Milon

== 1099 ==
- Offo
- Pietro
- Bobone
- Pietro
- Raniero
- Lamberto Scannabecchi Can. Reg. O.S.A.
- Gerardo
- Ottone
- Alberto
- Sigizzone seniore
- Benedetto
- Giovanni
- Giovanni
- Litusense
- Gionata seniore
- Bobone
- Gregorio Gaetani
- Stefano
- Ugo
- Aldo da Ferentino
- Bernardo

== Sources ==
- Miranda, Salvador. "Consistories for the creation of Cardinals, 11th Century (999-1099): Urban II (1088-1099)". The Cardinals of the Holy Roman Church. Florida International University. OCLC 53276621.
