= Pope Urban II =

Head of the Catholic Church from 1088 to 1099

Pope Blessed Urban II
- Bishop of Rome
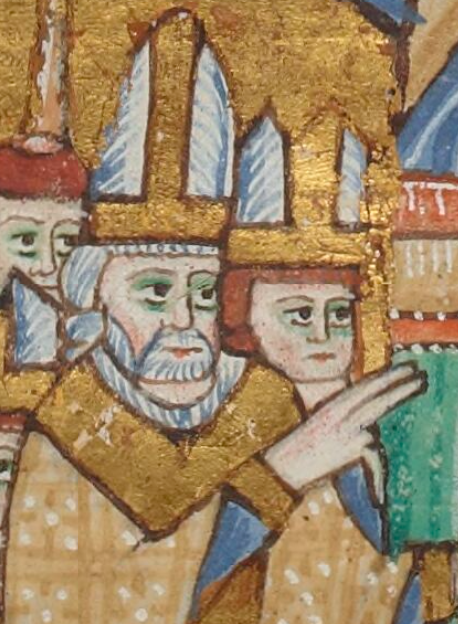
- Pope Urban II depicted in a c. late 12th century – early 13th century miniature, now at the National Library of France
- Church: Catholic Church
- Papacy began: 12 March 1088
- Papacy ended: 29 July 1099
- Predecessor: Victor III
- Successor: Paschal II
- Previous posts: Cardinal-Bishop of Ostia (1078–1088); Cardinal-Bishop of Velletri (1080–1088); Legate in Germany (1084–1085)

Orders
- Ordination: c. 1068
- Consecration: 20 July 1085
- Created cardinal: 1073 by Gregory VII
- Rank: Cardinal Deacon (1073–1078); Cardinal Bishop (1078–1088)

Personal details
- Born: Eudes (Odo) of Châtillon c. 1035 Lagery, County of Champagne, Kingdom of France
- Died: 29 July 1099 (aged 63–64) Rome, Papal States, Holy Roman Empire

Sainthood
- Venerated in: Catholic Church
- Beatified: 14 July 1881 by Pope Leo XIII

Pope Urban II (Latin: Urbanus II; c. 1035 – 29 July 1099), otherwise known as Odo of Châtillon or Otho de Lagery, (Note: Alternatively, Otto, Odo, or Eudes.) was the head of the Catholic Church and ruler of the Papal States from 12 March 1088 to his death. He is best known for convening the Council of Clermont, which ignited the series of Catholic military expeditions known as the Crusades.

Pope Urban was a native of France and a descendant of a noble family from the French commune of Châtillon-sur-Marne. Before his papacy, Urban was the grand prior of Cluny and bishop of Ostia. As pope, he dealt with Antipope Clement III, the infighting of various Christian nations, and the Turkish invasions into Anatolia. In 1095, he started preaching for the start of the First Crusade (1096–1099). He promised forgiveness and pardon for all of the past sins of those who would fight to reclaim the Holy Land from Muslims and free the Eastern churches. This pardon would also apply to those fighting the Muslims in Spain. While the First Crusade resulted in the capture of Jerusalem and expulsion of the Fatimids, Pope Urban II died before he could receive the news.

Urban II also set up the modern-day Roman Curia in the manner of a royal ecclesiastical court to help run the church. He was beatified by Pope Leo XIII on 14 July 1881.

== Bishop of Ostia ==
Urban, baptized Eudes (Odo), was born to a family of Châtillon-sur-Marne. In 1050, he began his studies at the nearby cathedral school of Reims. He was prior of the abbey of Cluny, and Pope Gregory VII later named him cardinal-bishop of Ostia c. 1080. He was one of the most prominent and active supporters of the Gregorian reforms, especially as legate in the Holy Roman Empire in 1084. He was among the three whom Gregory VII nominated as papabile (possible successors). Desiderius, the abbot of Monte Cassino, was chosen to follow Gregory VII in 1085 but, after his short reign as Victor III, Odo was elected by acclamation at a small meeting of cardinals and other prelates held in Terracina in March 1088.

== Papacy ==
=== Struggle for authority ===
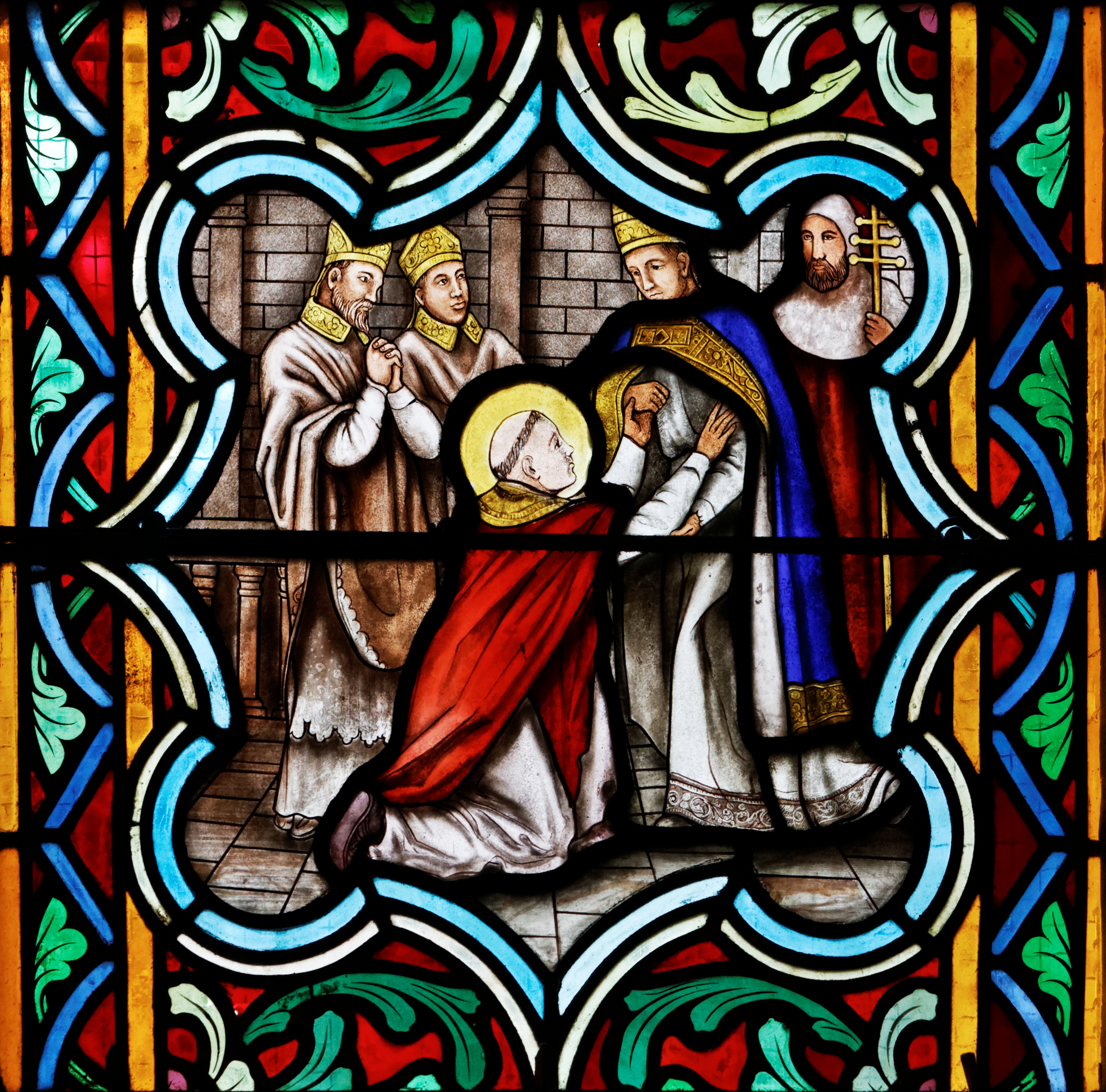
A 19th-century stained-glass depiction of Urban receiving St Anselm, exiled from England by William the Red amid the Investiture Controversy

From the outset, Urban had to reckon with the presence of Guibert, the former bishop of Ravenna who held Rome as the antipope Clement III. Pope Gregory VII had repeatedly clashed with the Holy Roman Emperor Henry IV over papal authority. Despite the Walk to Canossa, Gregory had backed the rebel Rudolf of Rheinfelden, the duke of Swabia, and again excommunicated the emperor. Henry finally took Rome in 1084 and installed Clement III in Gregory's place.

Urban took up Gregory's policies and, while pursuing them with determination, showed greater flexibility and diplomatic finesse. Usually kept away from Rome, Urban toured northern Italy and France. A series of well-attended synods held in Rome, Amalfi, Benevento, and Troia supported him in renewed declarations against simony, lay investitures, clerical marriages (partly via the cullagium tax), and the emperor and his antipope. He facilitated the marriage of Matilda, countess of Tuscany, with Welf II, duke of Bavaria. He supported the rebellion of Prince Conrad of Italy against his father and bestowed the office of groom on Conrad at Cremona in 1095. While there, he helped arrange the marriage between Conrad and Maximilla, the daughter of Count Roger I of Sicily, which occurred later that year in Pisa; her large dowry helped finance Conrad's continued campaigns. Empress Adelaide was encouraged in her charges of sexual coercion against her husband, Henry IV. He supported the theological and ecclesiastical work of Anselm of Canterbury, negotiating a solution to the cleric's impasse with King William II of England and finally receiving England's support against the imperial antipope in Rome.

However, Urban maintained vigorous support for his predecessors' reforms and did not shy from supporting Anselm when the new archbishop of Canterbury fled England. Likewise, despite the importance of French support for his cause, he upheld his legate Hugh of Die's excommunication of King Philip I of France over his doubly bigamous marriage with Bertrade de Montfort, wife of the Count of Anjou. (The ban was repeatedly lifted and reimposed as the king promised to forswear her and then repeatedly returned to her. A public penance in 1104 ended the controversy, although Bertrade remained active in attempting to see her sons succeed Philip instead of Louis VI of France.) Urban further authorised itinerant preachers such as Robert of Arbrissel to spread the knowledge of Christian faith and promote the ideas of the reform movement, contributing to the mass phenomenon of spirituality at the end of the 11th century.

=== First Crusade ===
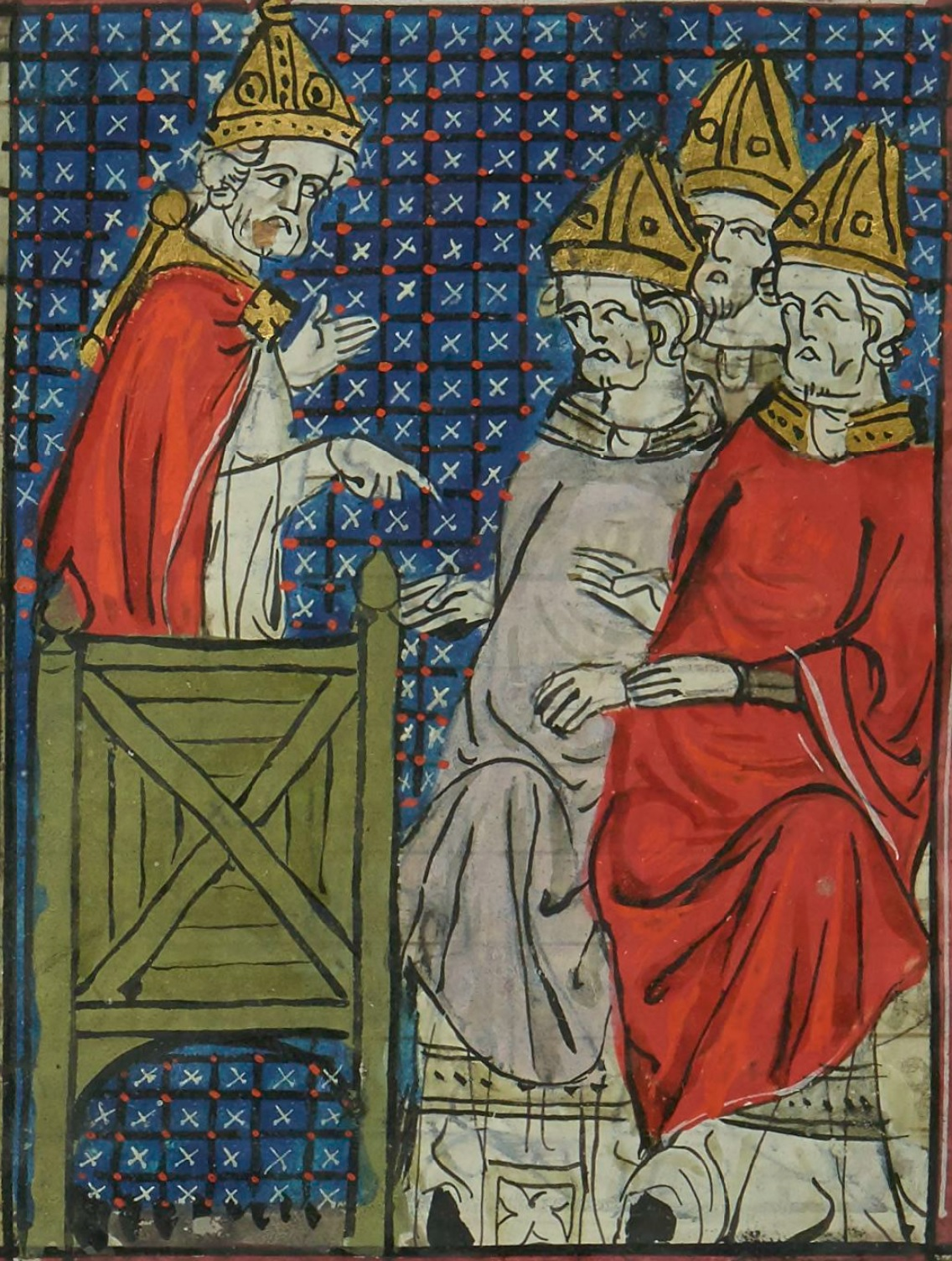
Urban at Clermont (14th century miniature)

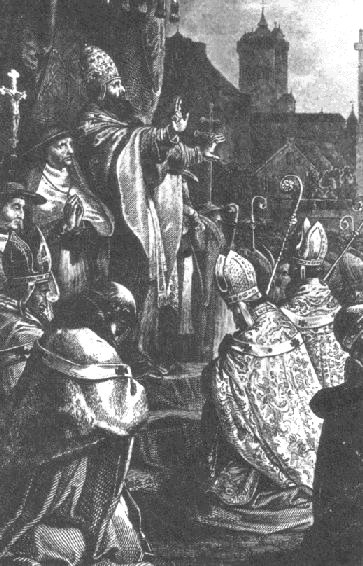
Pope Urban II preaching the First Crusade at the Council of Clermont

Urban II's movement took its first public shape at the Council of Piacenza, where, in March 1095, Urban II received an ambassador from the Byzantine Emperor Alexios I Komnenos asking for help against the Turkish tribes who had taken over most of formerly Byzantine Anatolia. The Council of Clermont met, attended by numerous Italian, Burgundian, and French bishops. All of the sessions except the final one took place either in the Clermont-Ferrand Cathedral or in the suburban church of Notre-Dame-du-Port.

Though the council was primarily focused on reforms within the church hierarchy, Urban II gave a speech on 27 November 1095 at the conclusion of the council to a broader audience. The speech was made outside in the open air to accommodate the vast crowd that had come to hear him.

Urban II's sermon proved highly effective, as he summoned the attending nobility and the people to wrest the Holy Land, and the eastern churches generally, from the domination of the Seljuks. This was the speech that triggered the Crusades.

No exact transcription exists of the speech that Urban delivered at the Council of Clermont. The five extant versions of the speech were written down sometime later and differ widely. All versions of the speech except that by Fulcher of Chartres were probably influenced by the chronicle account of the First Crusade called the Gesta Francorum (written c. 1101), which includes a version of it. Fulcher of Chartres was present at the council, though he did not start writing his history of the crusade, including a version of the speech until c. 1101. Robert the Monk may have been present, but his version dates from about 1106.

As a better means of evaluating Urban's true motives in calling for a crusade to the Holy Lands, there are four extant letters written by Pope Urban himself: one to the Flemish (dated December 1095); one to the Bolognese (dated September 1096); one to Vallombrosa (dated October 1096); and one to the counts of Catalonia (dated either 1089 or 1096–1099). However, whereas the three former letters were concerned with rallying popular support for the Crusades and establishing the objectives, his letters to the Catalonian lords instead beseech them to continue the fight against the Moors, assuring them that doing so would offer the same divine rewards as a conflict against the Seljuks. Urban II's letters, rather than the paraphrased versions of his speech at Clermont, reveal his thinking about crusading. Nevertheless, the versions of the speech have had a significant influence on popular conceptions and misconceptions about the Crusades. Fulcher of Chartres has Urban saying that the Lord and Christ beseech and command the Christians to fight and reclaim their land.

The chronicler Robert the Monk put this into the mouth of Urban II:

This land which you inhabit, shut in on all sides by the seas and surrounded by the mountain peaks, is too narrow for your large population; nor does it abound in wealth, and it furnishes scarcely food enough for its cultivators. Hence, it is that you murder one another, that you wage war, and that frequently you perish by mutual wounds. Let, therefore, hatred depart from among you, let your quarrels end, let wars cease, and let all dissensions and controversies slumber. Enter upon the road to the Holy Sepulchre; wrest that land from the wicked race, and subject it to yourselves ... God has conferred upon you above all nations great glory in arms. Accordingly, undertake this journey for the remission of your sins, with the assurance of the imperishable glory of the Kingdom of Heaven.

Robert continued:

When Pope Urban had said these ... things in his urbane discourse, he so influenced to one purpose the desires of all who were present that they cried out, "It is the will of God! It is the will of God!". When the venerable Roman pontiff heard that, [he] said: "Most beloved brethren, today is manifest in you what the Lord says in the Gospel, 'Where two or three are gathered together in my name there am I in the midst of them.' Unless the Lord God had been present in your spirits, all of you would not have uttered the same cry. For although the cry issued from numerous mouths, yet the origin of the cry was one. Therefore, I say to you that God, who implanted this in your breasts, has drawn it forth from you. Let this then be your war cry in combats because this word is given to you by God. When an armed attack is made upon the enemy, let this one cry be raised by all the soldiers of God: It is the will of God! It is the will of God!"

Within Fulcher of Chartres's account of Pope Urban's speech, there was a promise of remission of sins for whoever took part in the crusade.

All who die by the way, whether by land or by sea, or in battle against the pagans, shall have immediate remission of sins. This I grant them through the power of God with which I am invested.

It is disputed whether the famous slogan "God wills it" or "It is the will of God" (deus vult in Latin, Dieu le veut in French) in fact was established as a rallying cry during the council. While Robert the Monk says so, it is also possible that the slogan was created as a catchy propaganda motto afterward.

Urban II's own letter to the Flemish confirms that he granted "remission of all their sins" to those undertaking the enterprise to liberate the Eastern churches. One notable contrast with the speeches recorded by Robert the Monk, Guibert of Nogent, and Baldric of Dol is the lesser emphasis on Jerusalem itself, which Urban only once mentions as his own focus of concern. In the letter to the Flemish, he writes, "They [the Turks] have seized the Holy City of Christ, embellished by his passion and resurrection, and blasphemy to say—have sold her and her churches into abominable slavery." In the letters to Bologna and Vallombrosa, he refers to the Crusaders' desire to set out for Jerusalem rather than his desire for Jerusalem to be freed from Seljuk rule. It was believed that originally that Urban wanted to send a relatively small force to aid the Byzantines, however after meeting with two prominent members of the Crusades Adhemar of Puy and Raymond of Saint-Guilles, Urban decided to rally a much larger force to retake Jerusalem. Urban II refers to liberating the Church as a whole, or the broadly "Eastern churches" specifically, rather than reconquering Jerusalem itself. The phrases used are "churches of God in the eastern region" and "the eastern churches" (to the Flemish), "liberation of the Church" (to Bologna), "liberating Christianity [Lat. Christianitatis]" (to Vallombrosa), and "the Asian church" (to the Catalan counts). Coincidentally or not, Fulcher of Chartres's version of Urban's speech does not explicitly reference Jerusalem. Instead, it more generally refers to aiding the crusaders' Christian "brothers of the eastern shore" and to their loss of Asia Minor to the Turks.

It is still disputed what Pope Urban's motives were, as evidenced by the different recorded speeches, all of which differ. Some historians believe that Urban wished for the reunification of the Eastern and Western churches, a rift caused by the Great Schism of 1054. Others believe that Urban saw this as an opportunity to gain legitimacy as the pope as, at the time, he was contending with the antipope Clement III. A third theory is that Urban felt threatened by the Seljuk conquests in Europe and saw the crusades as a way to unite the Christian world into a unified defense against them.

The most important effect of the First Crusade for Urban himself was the removal of Antipope Clement III from Rome in 1097 by one of the French armies. His restoration there was supported by Matilda of Tuscany.

Urban II died on 29 July 1099, fourteen days after the fall of Jerusalem, but before news of the event had reached Italy; his successor was Pope Paschal II.

=== Spain ===
Urban was involved in Iberia from the very beginning of his time as pontiff. Of his involvements in Iberia there were two main engagements, namely:

- The elevation of the See of Toledo to the status of Primate over all Hispania in 1088
- The granting of an indulgence to Catalan nobles to "endeavor with all your [the Catalan nobles'] help to restore the state of the city of Tarragona."

Urban here gave support to the crusades in Spain against the Moors there. According to Chevedden, Urban was concerned that the focus on the east and Jerusalem would neglect the fight in Spain. He saw the fight in the east and in Spain as part of the same crusade so he would offer the same remission of sin for those that fought in Spain and discouraged those that wished to travel east from Spain. A similar line is taken by Erdmann, who views the conflict in Iberia as being premeditated by the Mahdia campaign of 1087 conducted by Pope Victor III due to the granting of an indulgence. This campaign, Erdmann argues, was considered a success because of the elevation of the see of Pisa in 1092 in which Urban acknowledges the recent "triumph" of the Pisans over Saracen forces.

=== Sicily ===
Urban received vital support in his conflict with the Byzantine Empire, Romans and the Holy Roman Empire from the Norman of Campania and Sicily. In return he granted Roger I the freedom to appoint bishops (the right of lay investiture), to collect Church revenues before forwarding to the papacy, and the right to sit in judgment on ecclesiastical questions. Roger I virtually became a legate of the Pope within Sicily. In 1098 these were extraordinary prerogatives that Popes were withholding from temporal sovereigns elsewhere in Europe and that later led to bitter confrontations with Roger's Hohenstaufen heirs.

== Veneration ==
Pope Urban was beatified in 1881 by Pope Leo XIII with his feast day on 29 July. However, at the Cathedral of Saint Matthew, at Salerno, Italy, in the monumental mosaic of the transept, above the high altar, Urban II is venerated as a Saint.

== See also ==
- House of Châtillon
- Beauvais Cathedral
- Milo of Nanteuil
- Concordat of Worms
- Gregorian Reforms
- Investiture Controversy
- Cardinals created by Urban II

== Notes ==
Catholic Church titles
Preceded by Victor III	Pope; 1088–1099	Succeeded by Paschal II
