= Cullagium =

Medieval tax imposed on clerics for the keeping of mistresses

The cullagium (also culagium; French: cullage, from Latin colligāre, "to collect") was a tax first imposed in England and France around the pontificate of Urban II (ca. 1042 – 29 July 1099) and thereafter as part of a drive towards clerical celibacy. It was a tax levied by the state on mistresses kept by clergymen. This was ostensibly to discourage the keeping of such mistresses, a practice officially condemned by both Church and state, but became a convenient source of revenue to the latter.

== See also ==
- Sin tax
