= San Pietro Alli Marmi =

Basilica in Eboli, Italy

Basilica of St. Peter Alli Marmi
- Badia di San Pietro Alli Marmi
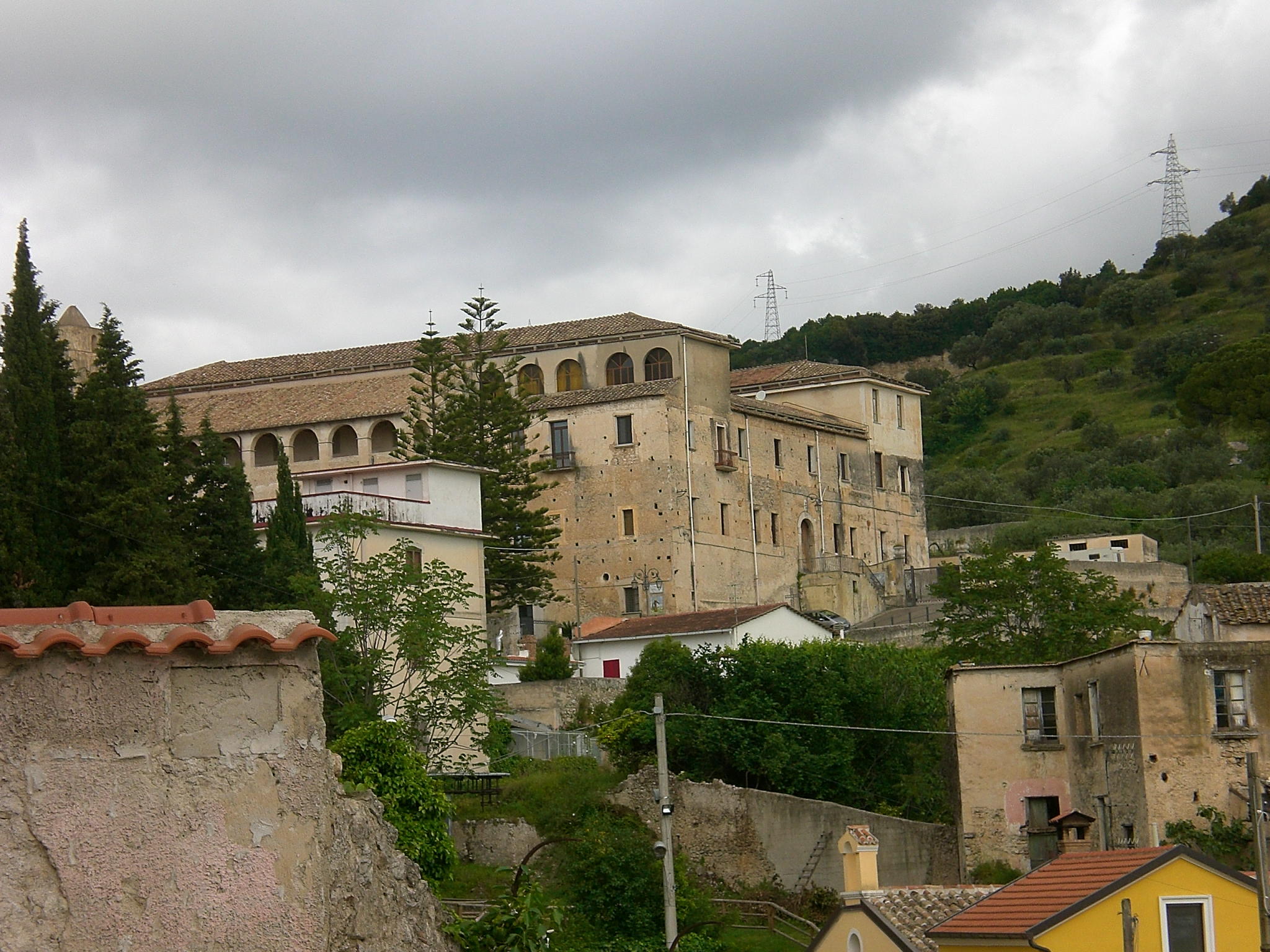
- View at the Basilica of St. Peter Alli Marmi

- Location within Campania Location within Italy
- Interactive map of Basilica of St. Peter Alli Marmi

Monastery information
- Other name: Basilica of Saint Peter Apostle
- Denomination: Roman Catholic
- Dedication: Roberto il Guiscardo

Architecture
- Status: National Monument
- Style: Baroque & Norman
- Completion date: 1156

Site
- Location: Piazzale Francescano Maria Immacolata, 84025 Eboli (SA), Campania, Italy
- Country: Italy
- Coordinates: 40°37′23″N 15°03′12″E
- Visible remains: Church, Convent, Crypt, Library
- Public access: Available
- Website: https://comune.eboli.sa.it/contenuti/89697/badia-san-pietro-alli-marmi

The Basilica of St. Peter Alli Marmi (Italian: Badia di San Pietro Alli Marmi) is a Basilica comprising a church and a monastery. It is located in Eboli, 33 kilometers away from the city of Salerno, in Italy.

Originally known as the Basilica of Saint Peter Apostle, it was built at the bottom of the hill of Montedoro, where the old medieval site of the city was situated. It is one of the distinctive landmarks of the region and an important tourist destination. Its construction displays the strong influence of Norman and Baroque architecture. The church contains the remains of Saint Berniero. Attached to the church is the convent of the Capuchin friars, originally inhabited by the Benedictines. The Basilica has a characteristic cloister that incorporates an African Museum (administrated by missionary friars) and the Library of the Capuchins, which has a collection of over 15,000 volumes.

A distinctive element of the Basilica is the bell tower.

== History ==
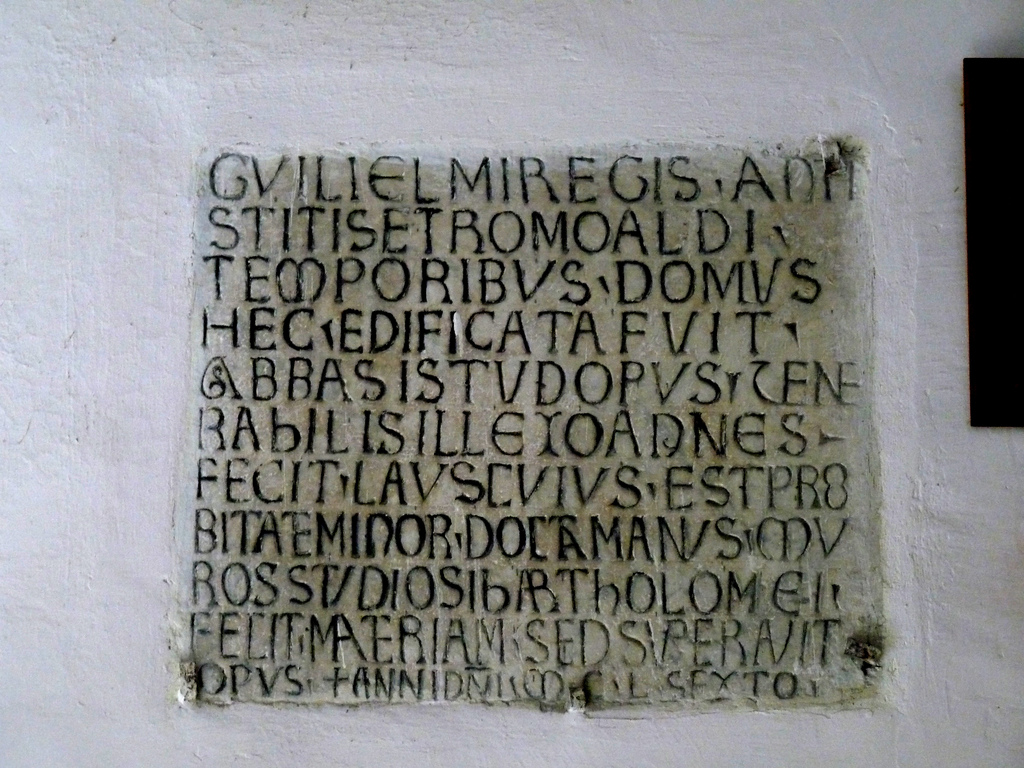
Dedicatory plaque within the church of St. Peter Alli Marmi.

The presence of Robert Guiscard in Salerno suggests that the initial foundations of the Basilica might have coincided with the construction of Cathedral of San Matteo in Salerno around 1076. The inscription in Latin on a dedicatory plaque within the church indicates that the construction was completed in 1156. Following its completion, the Basilica was entrusted to the Benedictines until the year 1557. In the 11th and 12th centuries, the church of St. Peter of Eboli was part of three local feudal domains created by the Roman Catholic Prelates appointed by the Lombards. This manor included the church, the village of Battipaglia and open land adjacent to the Sele (river). It was administered from the village of Santa Maria a Corte, in which the regional episcopal office and local Baiulus was located.

In 1743, Benedict XIV assigned the abbey of Saint Peter to the College of Chinese, directed by Matteo Ripa. From 1886, the friars of The Order of Friars Minor Capuchin permanently acquired the complex of the Basilica.

In 1929, the ceiling and columns of the central and left-side aisles of the church collapsed. While the capitols were reassembled after that event, a significant portion of the mullioned windows could not be preserved. The nomenclature Basilica of St. Peter Alli Marmi was assigned in 1930, due to the significant presence of marble within the complex.

=== Present day ===
The Basilica of St. Peter alli Marmi is still a practicing monastery, inhabited by the Capuchin friars. It is also used as a venue for weddings and public events:

- "This crosses the Convent" (Italian: "Questo passa il convento"): a street food and music event aimed at fundraising
- "Berniero 2018": the 2nd edition of the festival dedicated to Saint Berniero and his pilgrimage
- "Francisco's garden" (Italian: "L'orto di Francesco"): an event organized by the Municipality of Eboli in collaboration with the Secular Franciscan Order of Eboli
- "FL. 4,13 - Fra Humble: Him, us, you" (Italian: "FL. 4,13 - Fra Umile: Lui, noi, voi"): a literary event by Giuseppe Piegari
- "Freselle in the moonlight" (Italian: "Freselle al chiaro di luna"): a Folk music event
- "Free in chants" (Italian: "LiberiinCanti"): a choral festival

== Architecture ==
The architecture of the Basilica of St. Peter Alli Marmi is inspired by Norman architecture. It is centered around a rectangular cloister bordered by a portico covered with groin vaults, that are supported by semicircular arches. The keystones of the arches are adorned with noble coats of arms.

The structure encompasses three levels and an additional attic floor. On the first floor, cells overlooking the cloister are connected by a corridor and the second floor can be reached by a secondary staircase. The planimetric distribution is the same in every floor.

The cave of Our Lady of Fatima and Bernadette is located inside the Basilica, in the access square to the churchyard.

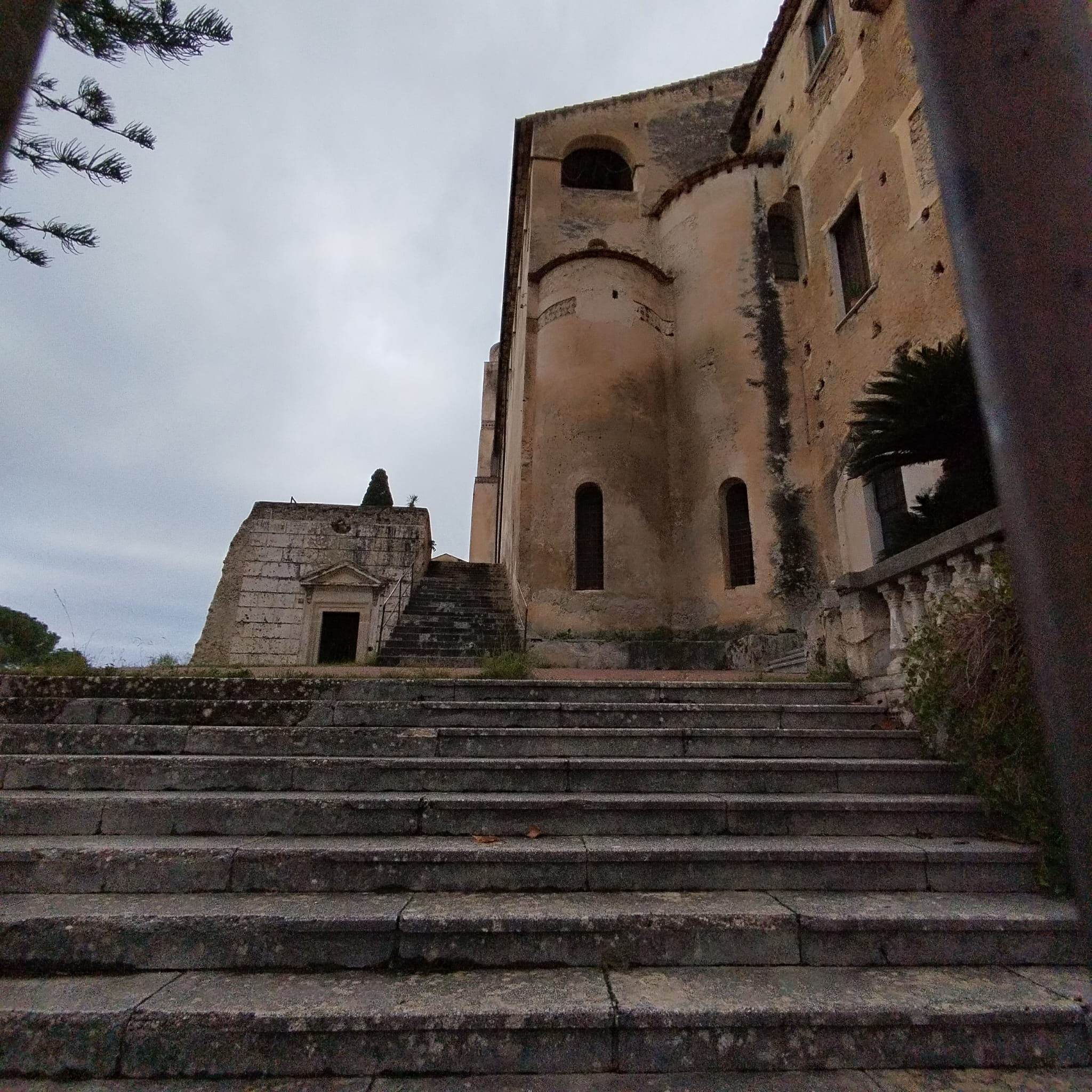
Staircase at the entrance of the Basilica of St. Peter Alli Marmi.

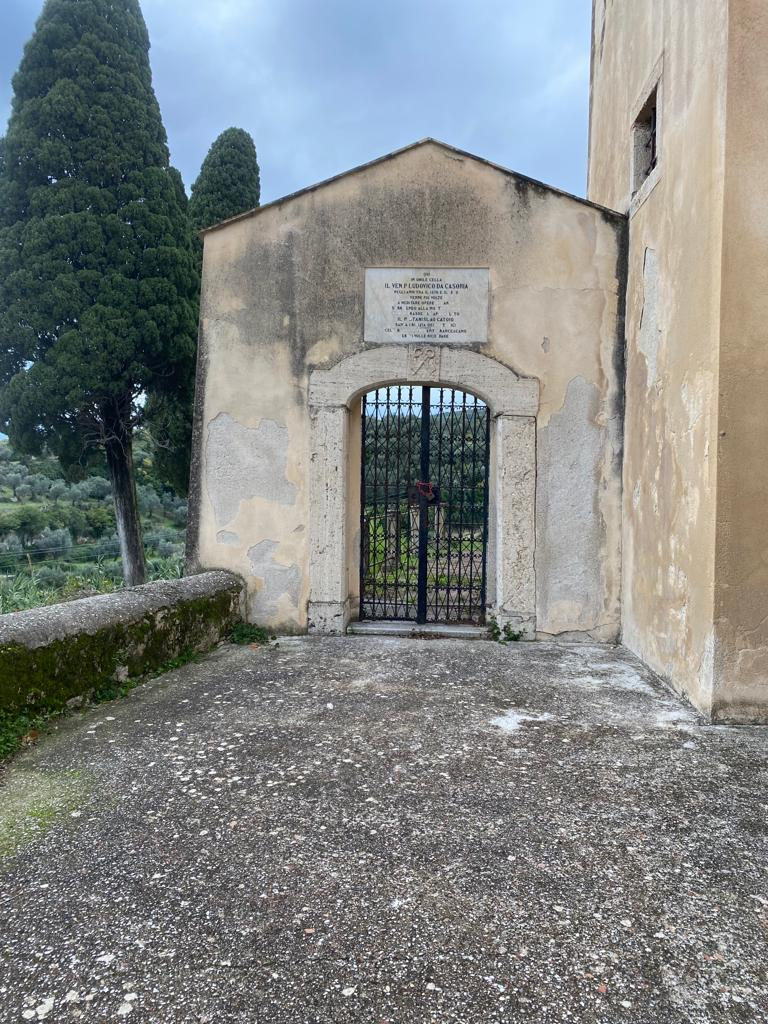
Entrance of the Basilica of St. Peter Alli Marmi.

== Convent of the Capuchin friars ==
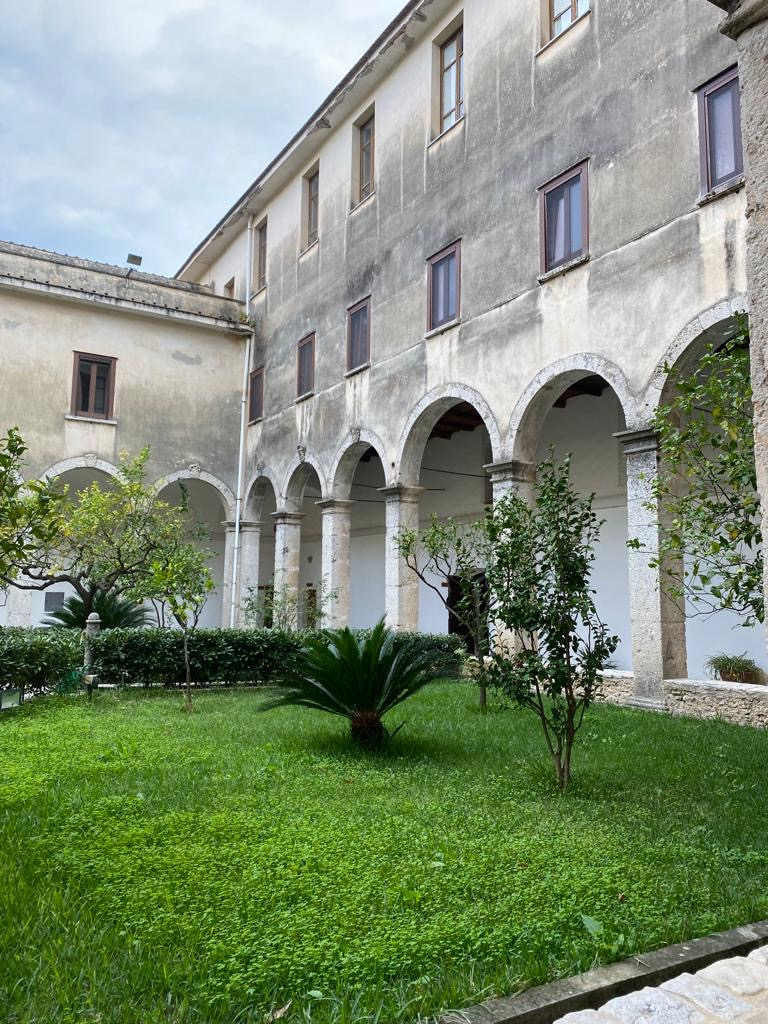
Portico of the Cloister of St. Peter Alli Marmi, covered with groin vaults supported by semicircular arches.

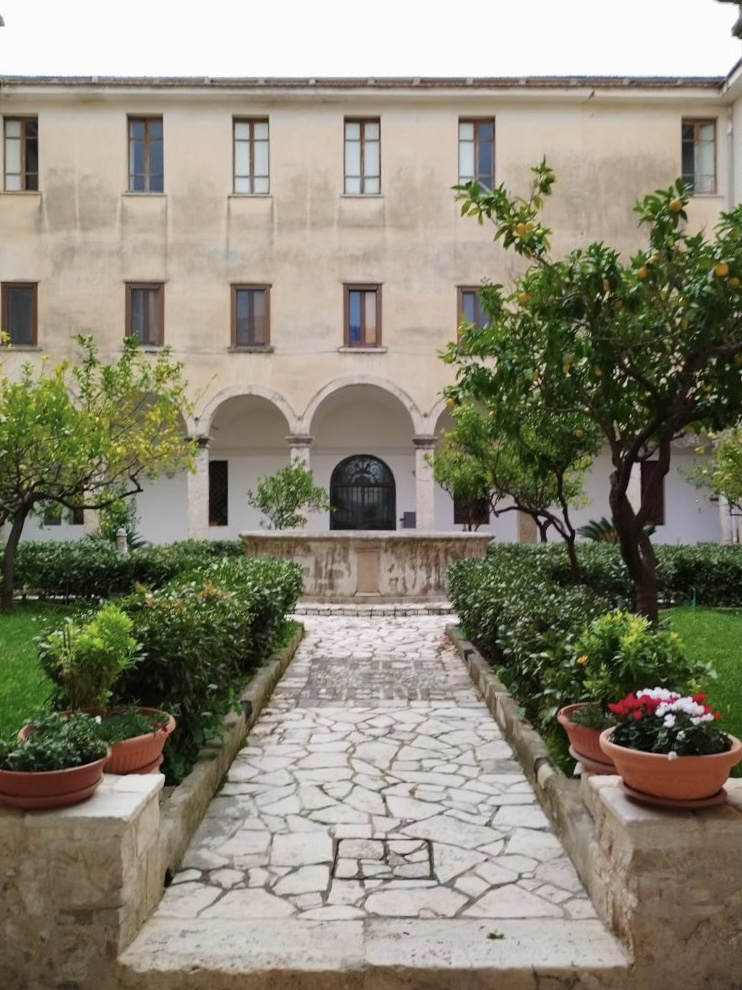
Cloister of the Basilica of St. Peter alli Marmi.

The Convent of St. Peter Alli Marmi is a rectangular building with three different levels and features an internal cloister as a central component. The cloister is surrounded by three buildings and the body of the church. The main entrance provides access to the vestibule and cloister.

=== Architecture ===
The architecture is characterized by its single lancet windows and an apse, which is decorated with traces of frescoes in the lateral areas. The frescoes were made by the artist Giovanni Luca De Luca (son of Giovanni Luca de Magistro) between 1564 and 1578. The left apse is frescoed with the images of Saint Andrew and Saint Peter while another represents the resurrection of Christ.

The main facade is elevated compared to the current road level and encompasses a two-storey central body with an arched portal. At the ends of the main facade, an additional floor exists that corresponds with the lateral bodies of the complex. The ground floor is characterized by a covered porch with groin vaults, supported by round arches with stone archivolts, upheld by square pillars.

Tuff and mixed masonry have been used for the construction of the vertical structures; while wooden trusses for the attics and the roof substructure. The facade is finished with smooth plaster. The roof is covered in barrel-shaped tiles.

=== Library of the Capuchins ===
The Library of the Capuchins is situated inside the convent and contains a collection of over 15,000 volumes. They are housed in wooden bookshelves that were made in the 20th century. In addition to books, many old newspapers are stored in its premises, including L’Osservatore Romano. The shelves and platforms are distinguished by a specific alphanumeric series made of porcelain enamel and black ink. The library serves as an aggregator of local cultural interests, hosting meetings and conferences.

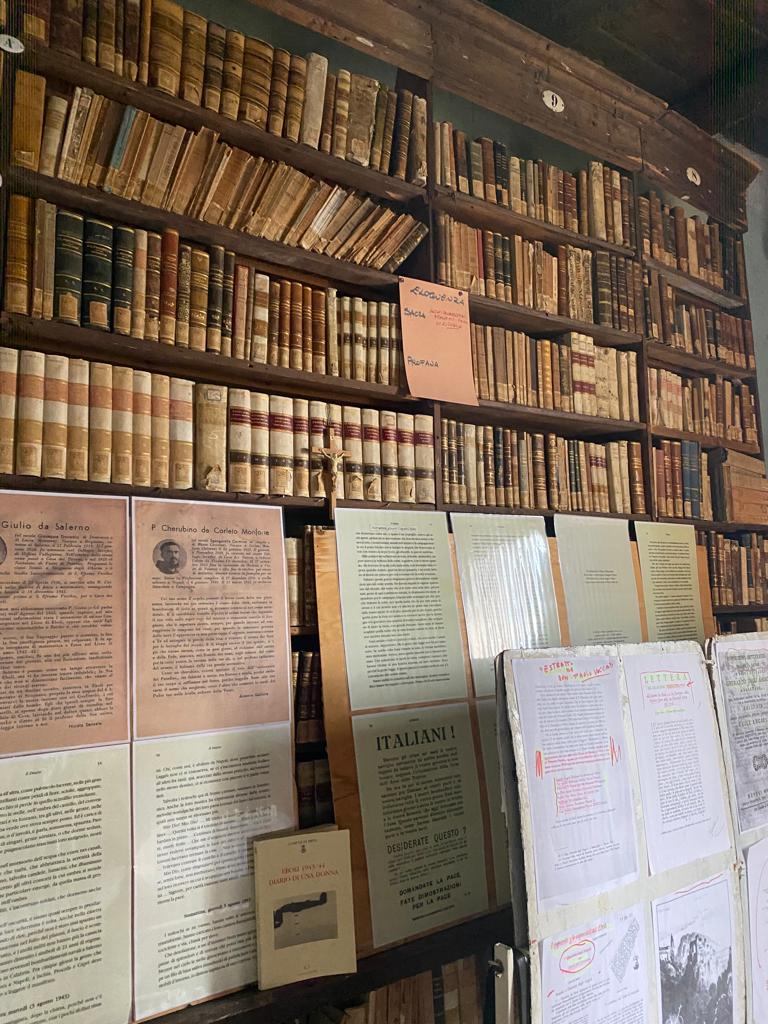
Inside of the library of the Capuchins in the Convent of St. Peter Alli Marmi.

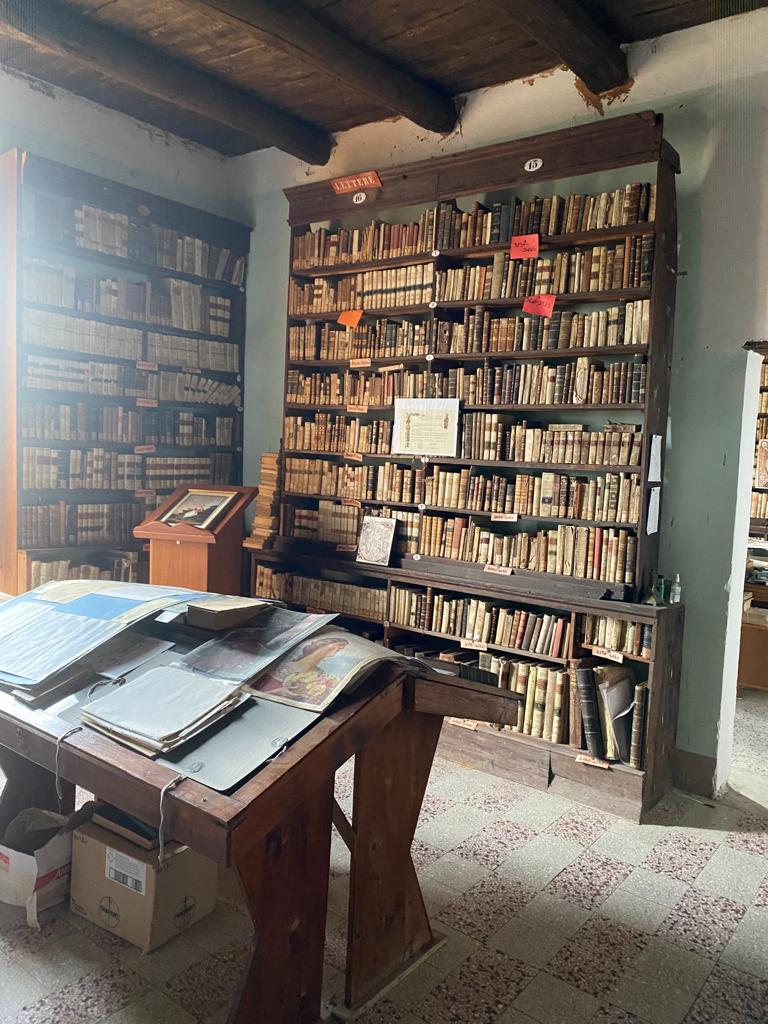
Inside of the library of the Capuchins in the Convent of St. Peter Alli Marmi.

== Church of St. Peter Alli Marmi ==
The main entrance of the church contains a staircase that connects the square with the churchyard. The entrance, originally located on the wall opposite the apse, now opens onto the right nave and is characterized by a simple stone portal adorned with the coat of arms of the House of Carafa.

=== History ===
The first documented mention dates back to 1090, where it is referred to as "sancti petri apostoli quod situm est foris et castelum evuli." (English: "Saint Peter Apostle, which is situated outside and the castle of Eboli"). There is a lack of precise records about the church from 1156 onwards. Documents from 1186, 1475, and 1501 (attributed to Pope Julius II) offer information and details regarding the entire monastery. The Fathers lived in the convent until the Napoleonic military occupation of 1806, which was then followed by the Decree of Suppression on 7 August 1807. In 1929, the church roof fell and both the central and left nave were destroyed, bringing down also the columns and capitals. Both remained intact and reconstruction was possible, except for most part of the single-lancet windows.

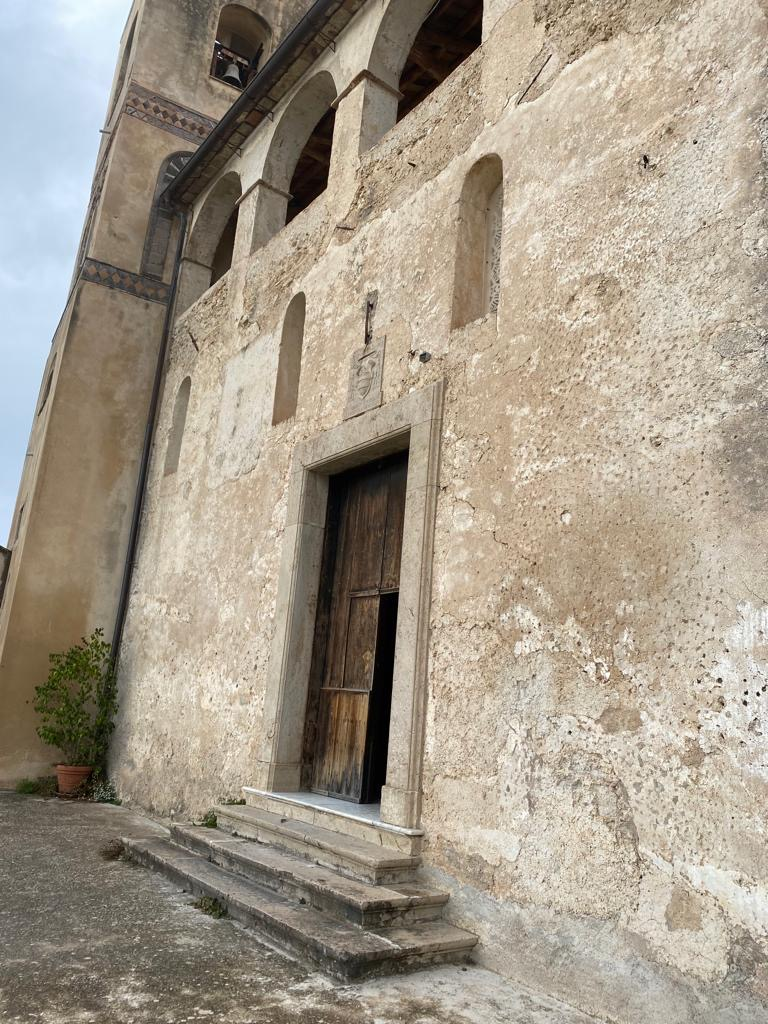
Entrance of the church of the Basilica of St. Peter alli Marmi.

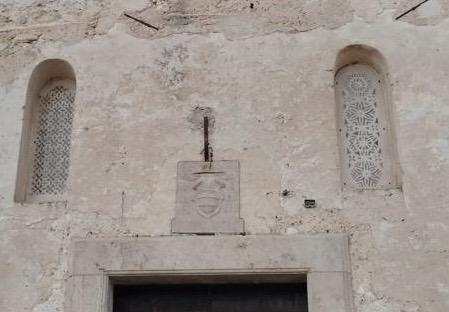
Coat of arms of the House of Carafa above the entrance of the church of St. Peter Alli Marmi.

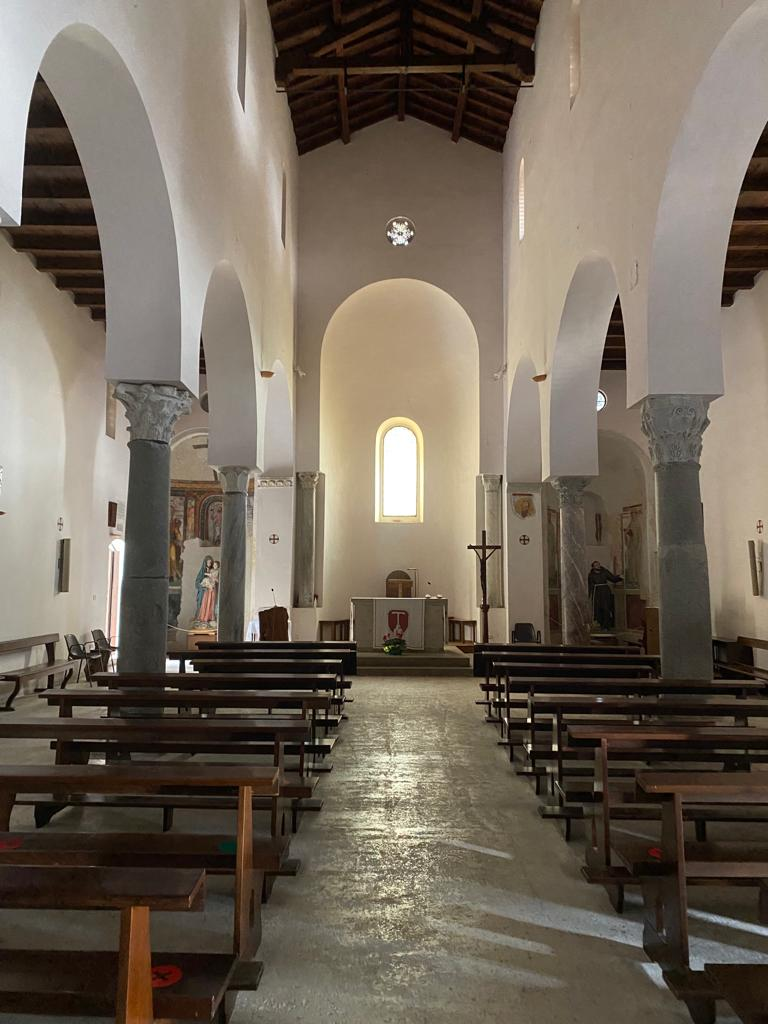
Interior of the church of St. Peter Alli Marmi.

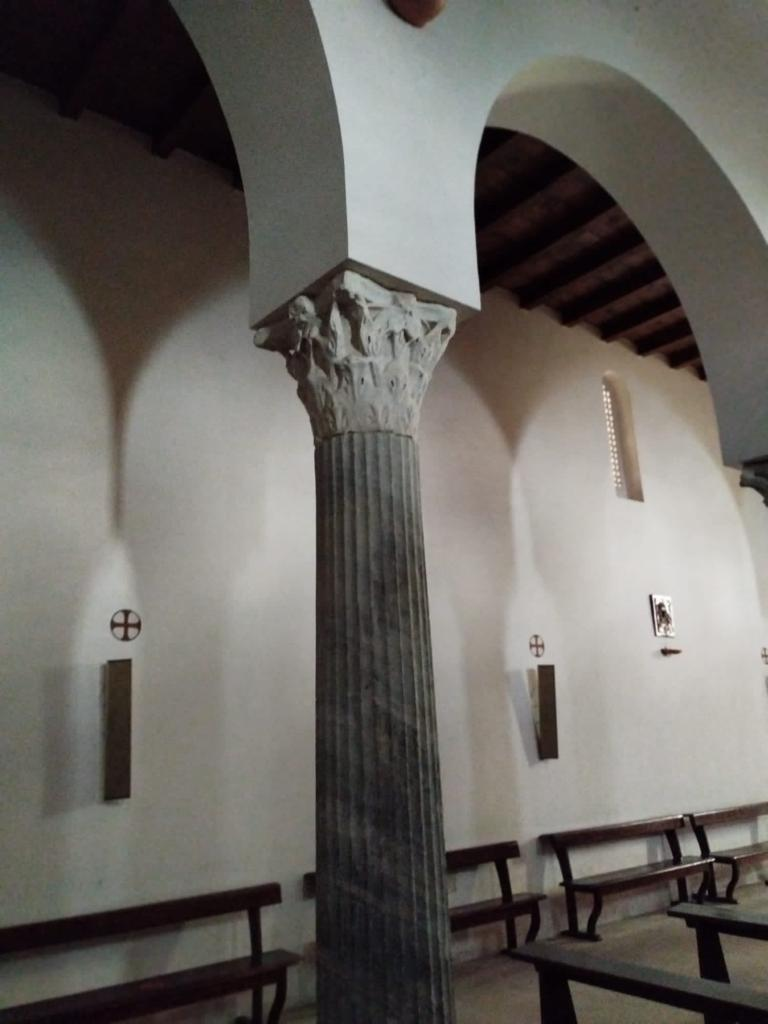
Column inside the church of St. Peter Alli Marmi.

=== Crypt of St. Berniero ===
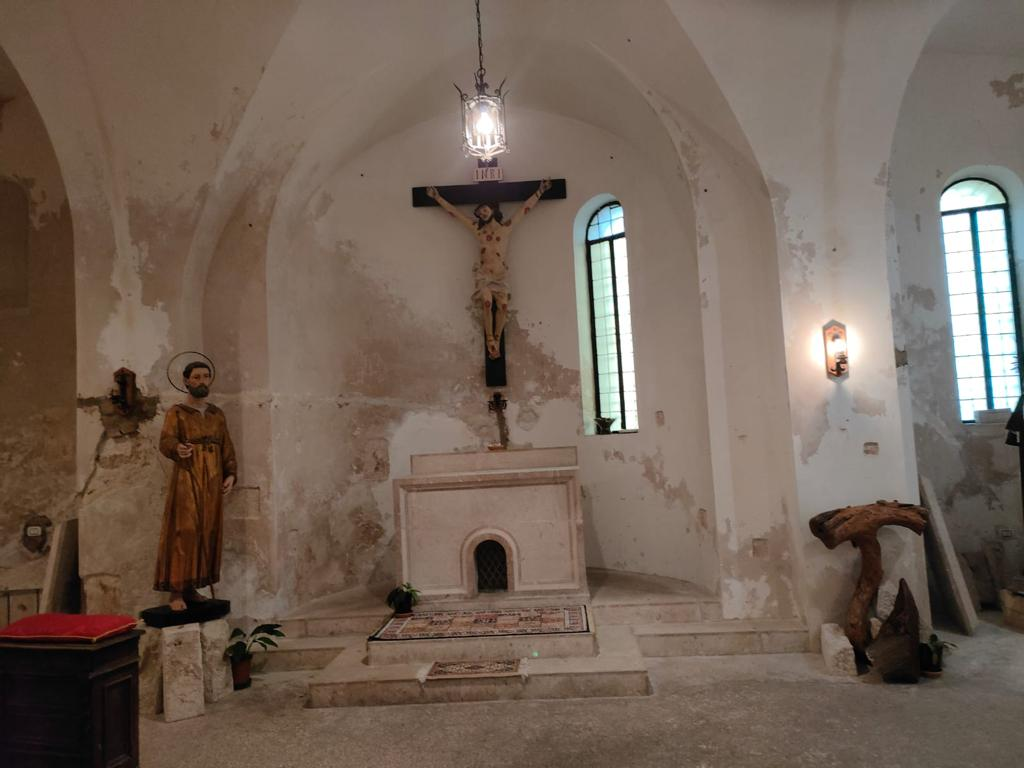
Interior of the crypt of St. Berniero in the Basilica of St. Peter Alli Marmi.

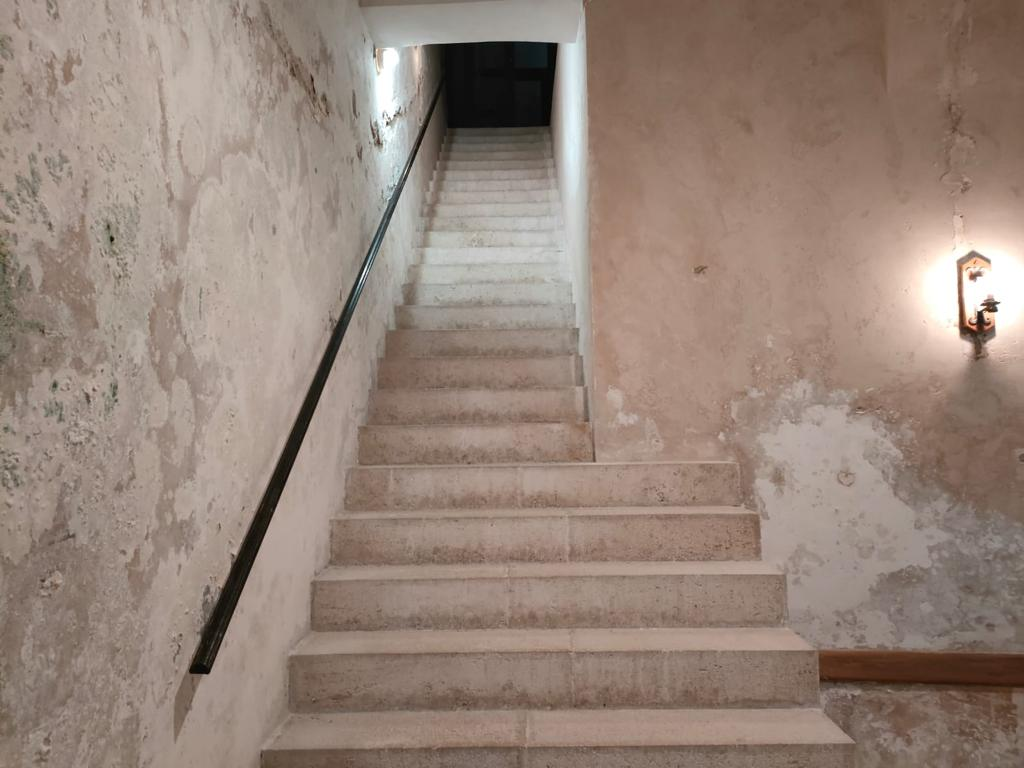
Access to the crypt of St. Berniero in the Basilica of St. Peter Alli Marmi.

The crypt is notable for containing the remains of St. Berneiro, the co-patron of Eboli. It can be accessed from the aisle of the Upper Basilica through a staircase. The crypt has a cross-vaulted ceiling supported by marble columns and is rectangular in shape with three apses corresponding to those of the upper Basilica.

==== Saint Berniero ====
Saint Berniero was born in Northern Spain, in the city of El Burgo de Osma, the ancient Uxameburg. Berniero belonged to a wealthy noble family, but since he was a child, he pursued a life of austerity, rejecting vanity and futility. When Berniero landed in Italy, he first visited Saint Peter's grave in Rome, then settled in the city of Eboli. His arrival in Eboli is reported in the Acta Sanctorum:

Quotation	Paraphrase
"Bienerus, sive Bernerius Hispanus ex urbe Uxameburg quae nunc Burgum Osmae in Hispania dicitur, claro genese octus, ... a saeculi voluptatibus abhorseus, selicta patria, ecclesiarum praecipuarum peregrinationem suscepit. In qua cum magnam vitae partem consumpsisset, tandem in Italiam veniens, apud Ebulum, oppidum in Picentibus, sibsistit, cellula exstructa, victum quaritaus, modico pane et vino od voletudinem stomachi contentus, caetera pauperibus irogalat."	"Bienero, or Bernerio Hispanic, from the city of Uxameburg, that in Spain is now named Burgo de Osma, born from a distinguished family, … once he distanced himself from the earthly pleasures and left his land, he began a pilgrimage of the main churches. After spending most of his life in pilgrimage, he finally arrived in Italy, in Eboli, a village between the Piceni, he stopped there and, once he built a cell, begged the food, satisfied the need of the stomach with some modest food and wine, he gave everything else to the poor."

In 1643, it was recorded in the Acta Sanctorum that Berniero participated in the construction of the bridge above the Sele (river), which was collapsing each night following each day's building works. When Berniero intervened, the bridge was built so securely that it did not fall again:

Quotation	Paraphrase
"Ebulensis pontem super Silaro omne edificare aggressus esset, et quod una die extruetatur, altera corrueret, Bernerius collecta mendicando pecunia, et ex ea lapidibus et caemento emptis, fabricam pontis suis manibus aggreditur; ita ut quod uno die factum esset, seguenti duplicatum invenisetur, Ponte igitur absoluto ..."	"Since in Eboli started the construction of a bridge above the whole Sele river, and one day it was built, the next it collapsed, Berniero, raised through mendication the money with which he procured himself stones and cement, realized the structure of the bridge with his own hands; so, in the same way it was planned in one day, the next it was duplicated, and as a result the bridge was completed."

During his late years Berniero showed his abilities as a constructor in the building of the Basilica of St. Peter Alli Marmi. When he died, another miracle happened: frozen oil melted and kept on falling from the jars situated on the oil-press in the Benedictines' monastery. The oil flowed down the streets of the city, allowing people to stock up in times of dearth. This event is known as the “Miracle of the olive tree".

Berniero was buried in the Basilica and his remains were initially discovered on 16 October 1556. The event was associated with rain starting to pour from the sky after months of drought. His remains were rediscovered in 1929 during restoration work of the crypt after the collapse of the ceiling.

St. Berniero is the co-patron of Eboli, invoked for spiritual illnesses and demonic possessions. The feast day is celebrated on November 20.

==== Crypt ====
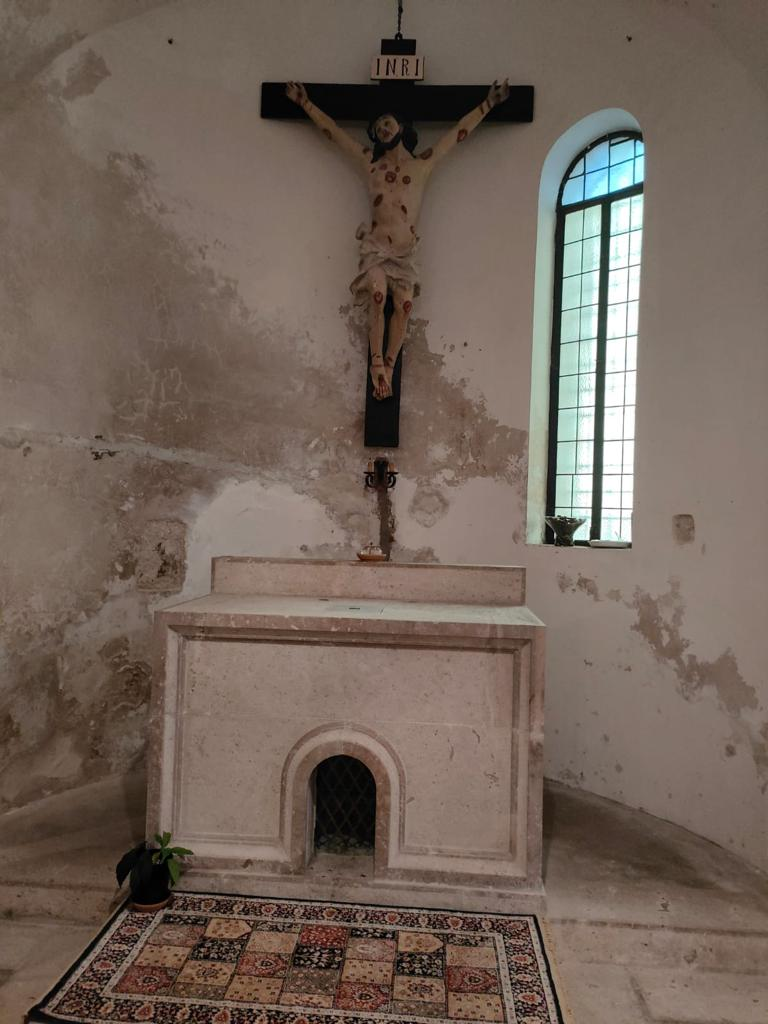
Altar of the crypt of St. Berniero in the Basilica of St. Peter Alli Marmi.

During the restoration of 1930–1934, the vaults were renewed, the structure of the apse and of the columns was strengthened and the outside buttresses were reinforced.

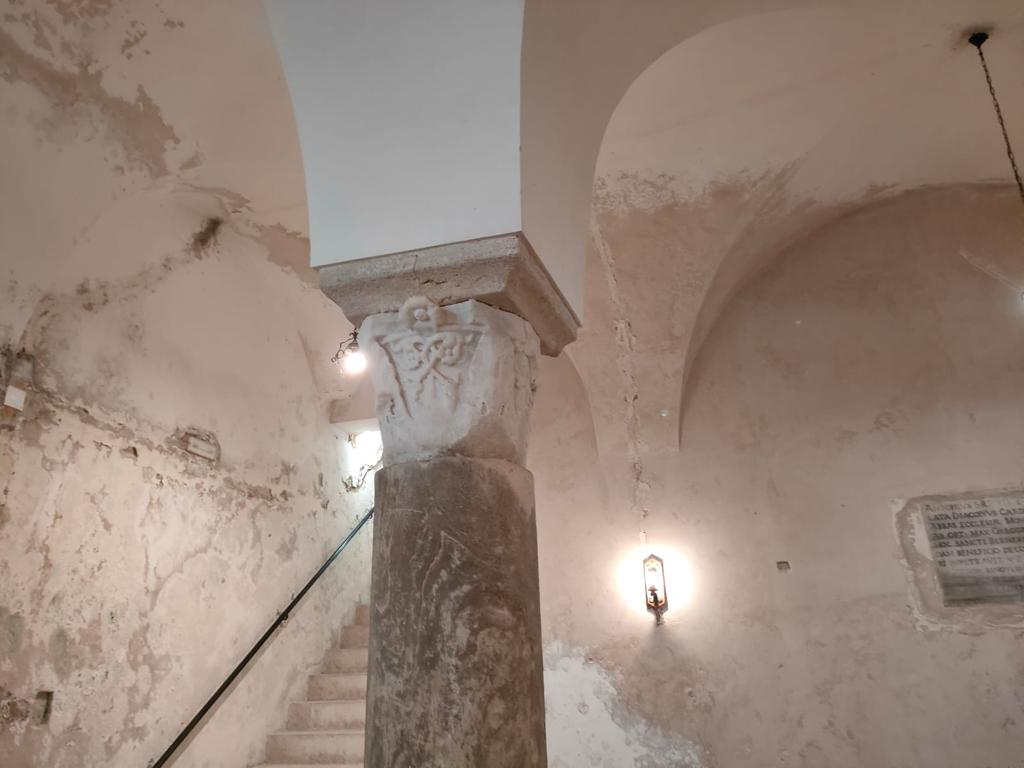
Column inside the crypt of St. Berniero in the Basilica of St. Peter Alli Marmi.

The center of the crypt contains the altar which preserves the remains of Saint Berniero in an urn. Above it is a linear crucifix from the 17th. On the left side of the apse is a statue of St. Fidelis of Sigmaringen made out of wood, created by the sculptor Giacometti Colombo in 1690. The statue holds a crucifix in the left hand while his right hand points to it with his index finger.

To the right of the linear crucifix there is a statue of Saint Berniero, created in 1610 by the sculptor Donato Villano of Naples. The Saint is represented in a pilgrim dress, with a stick in his hands in the act of chasing away the devil from a possessed woman.

=== Bell Tower ===
It is characterized by decorative bands of grey tuff inlays and terracotta tiles. The design incorporates elements reminiscent of Arab decorations with Sicilian origins.

== Gallery ==
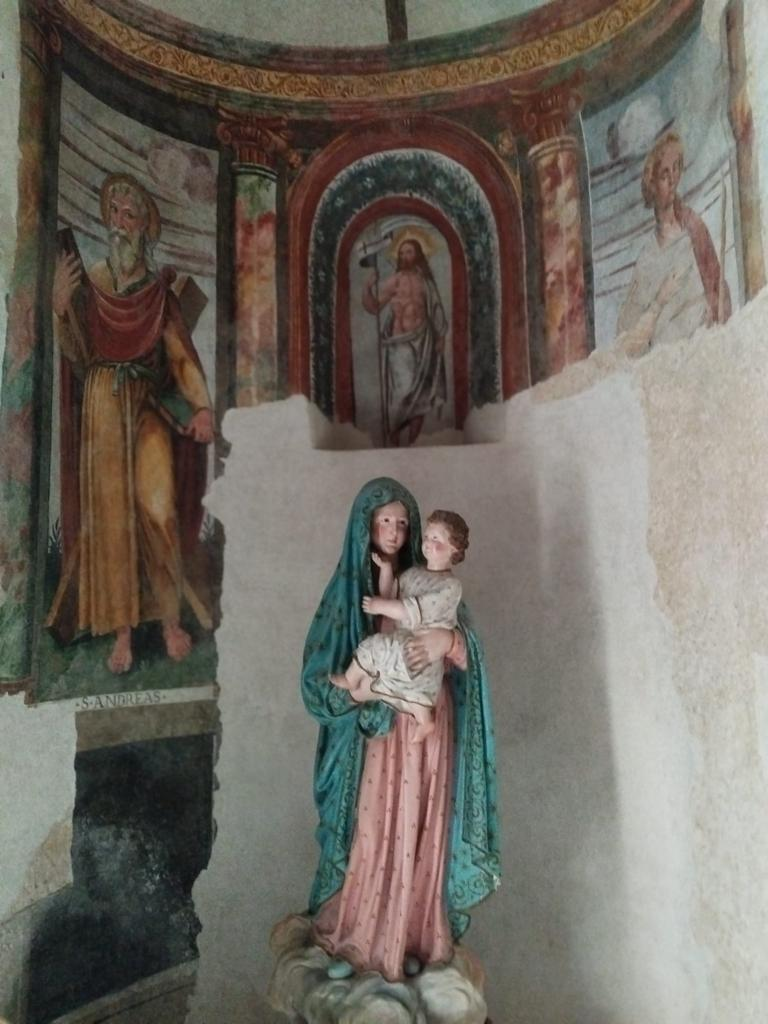
Statue of Mary in the Church of St. Peter Alli Marmi

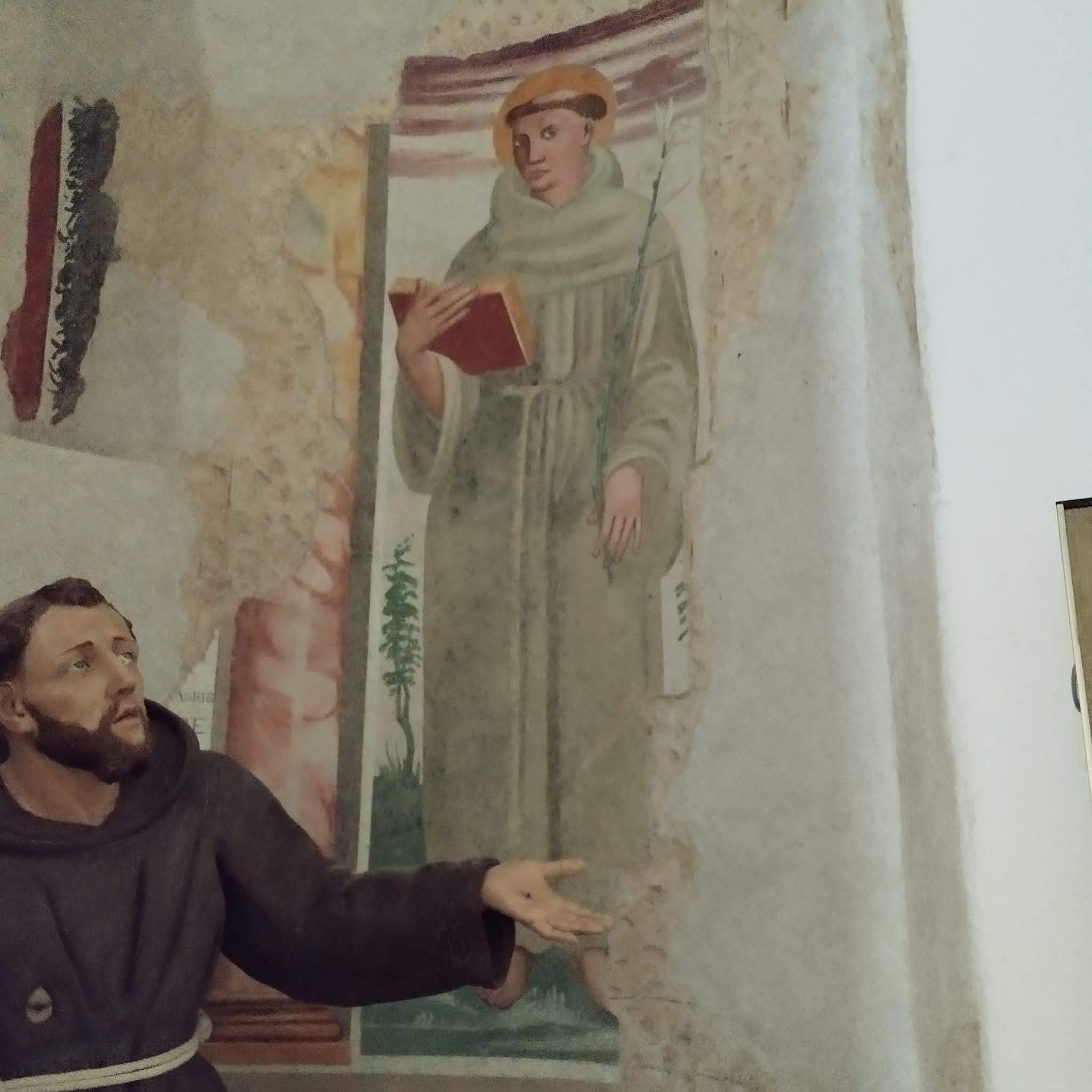
Painting in the Church of St. Peter Alli Marmi

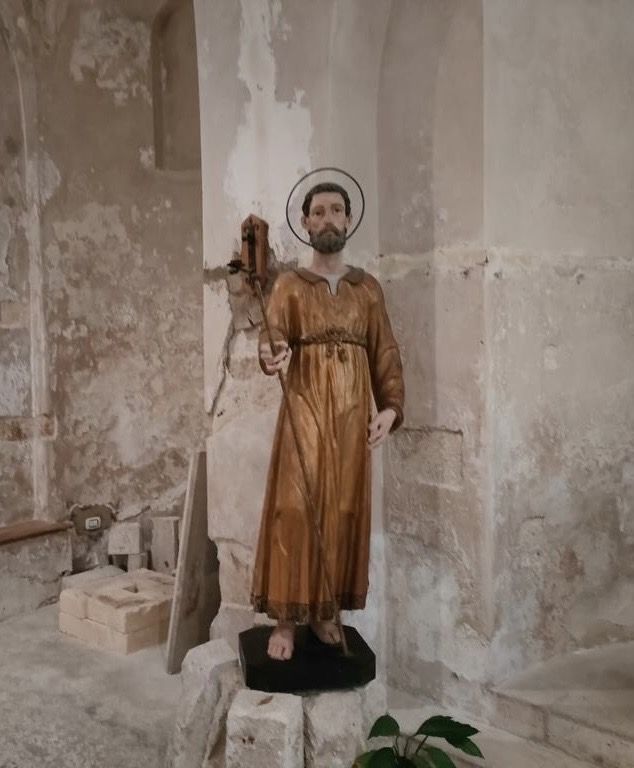
Statue of St. Berniero in the Crypt

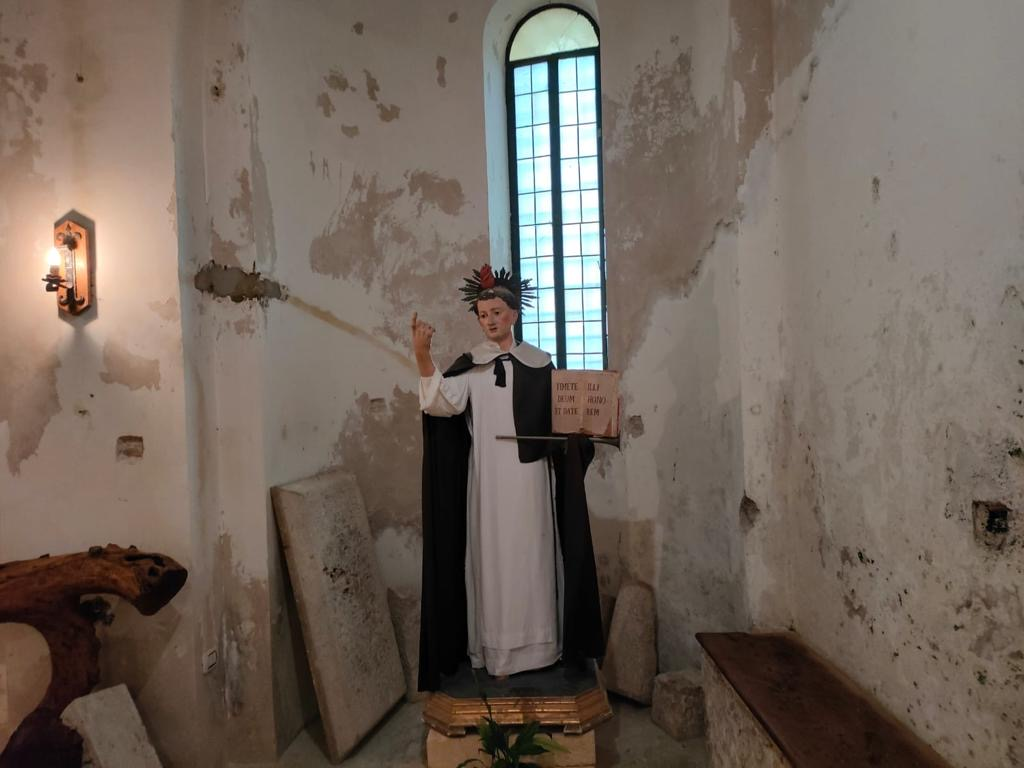
Statue of St. Vincent Ferrer in the Crypt

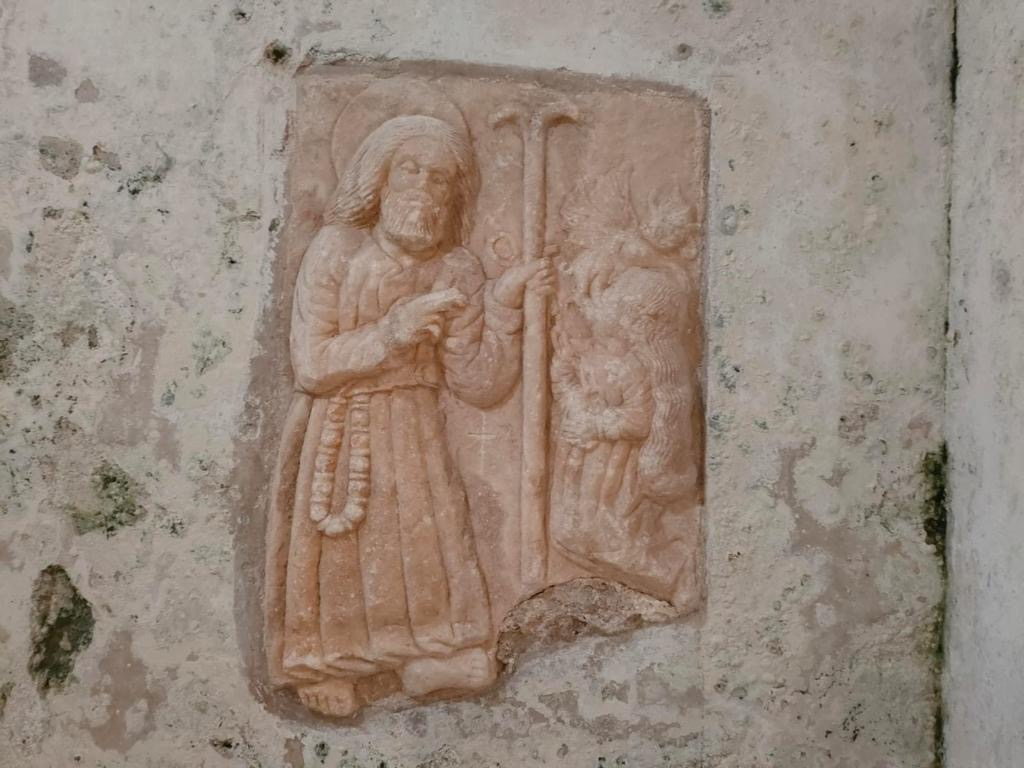
Bas-relief of St. Berniero in the Crypt

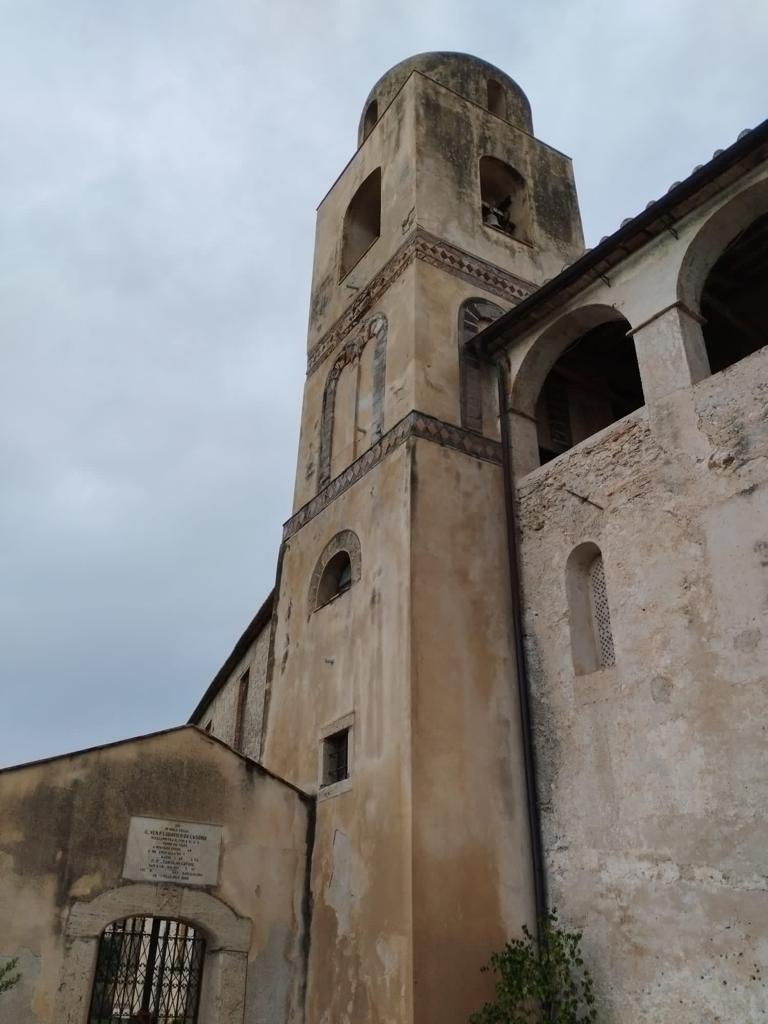
Bell Tower of the Basilica of St. Peter Alli Marmi.

== See also ==
- Salerno Cathedral
- Palermo Cathedral in Palermo, Sicily
- Church of the Santissima Annunziata dei Catalani in Messina, Sicily
- Christ Stopped at Eboli
- List of basilicas in Italy

== Bibliography ==
- F. Ughelli, Italia Sacra, "Sive de episcopis Italiae et insularum adiacenium", Venezia, 1721, vol.VII, coll. 646–7
- G. Bergamo, "Chiese e monasteri di Eboli tra il 1000 e il 1300", Salerno, 1946, p. 87
- A. Venditti, "Architettura bizantina nell'Italia Meridionale", Campania, Calabria, Lucania, Napoli, E.S.T, 1967, vol. II, p. 684
- A. Caffaro, F. Coiro, "Eboli aspetti e problemi", Palladio, Salerno, 1977, pp. 36–37
- G. Crisci, A. Campagna, "Salerno sacra", Salerno, 1962, pp. 470–472
