= Salerno Cathedral =

Catholic church in Salerno, Italy

Coordinates: 40°40′48″N 14°45′37″E

- Primatial Metropolitan Cathedral of Saint Mary of the Angels, Saint Matthew and Saint Gregory VII
- Cattedrale Primaziale Metropolitana di Santa Maria degli Angeli, San Matteo e San Gregorio VII
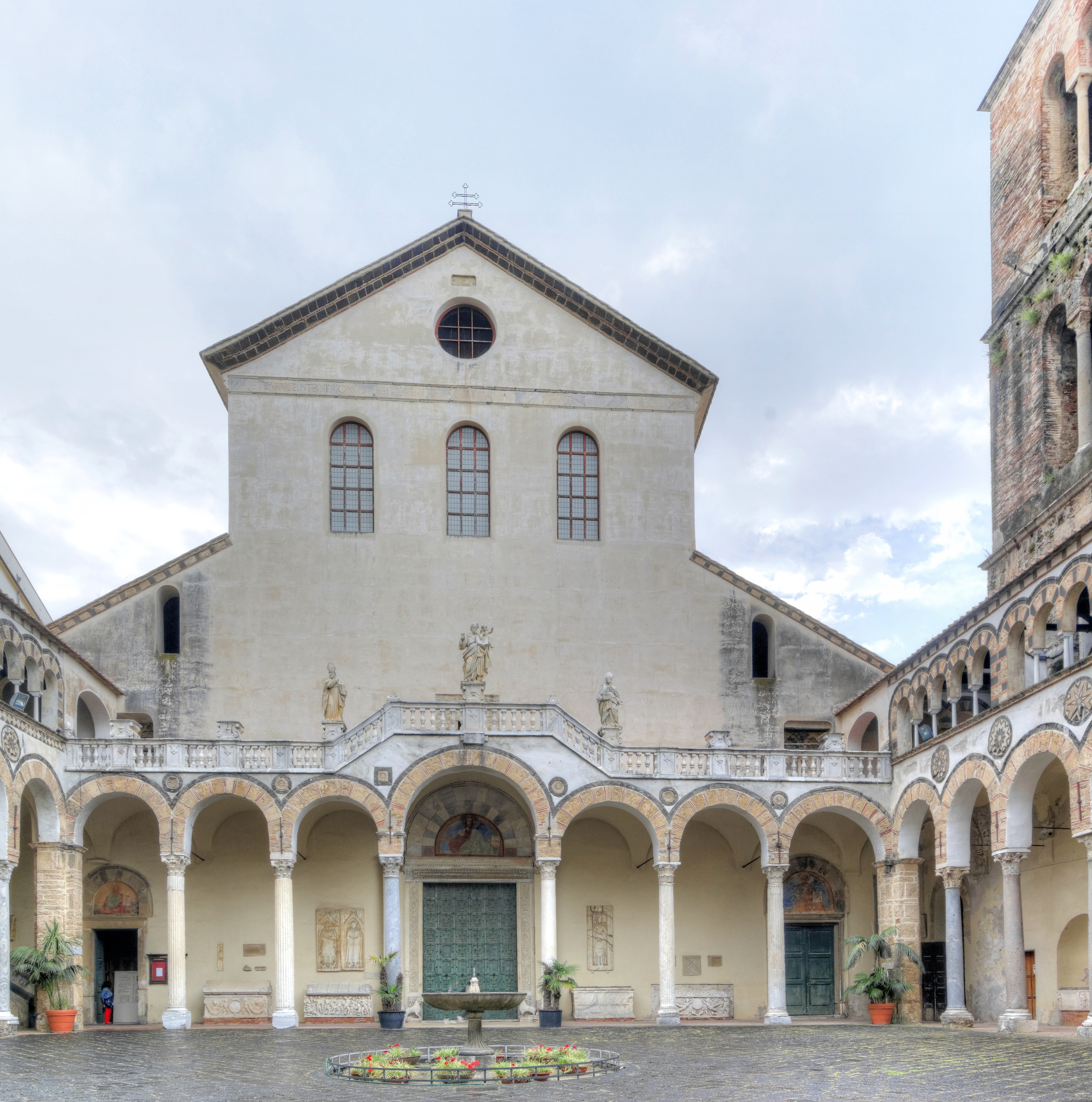
- Photo of St Matthew's
- Salerno Cathedral
- Location: Salerno, Campania
- Country: Italy
- Language: Italian
- Denomination: Catholic
- Website: cattedraledisalerno.it

History
- Status: Cathedral, minor basilica
- Consecrated: 1084

Architecture
- Style: Romanesque, Norman, Byzantine
- Years built: 1080
- Completed: 1085

Administration
- Diocese: Salerno

Salerno Cathedral (or Duomo) is the main church in the city of Salerno in southern Italy and a major tourist attraction. It is dedicated to Saint Matthew, whose relics are inside the crypt.

The cathedral was built when the city was the capital of the Principality of Salerno, over a more ancient church (the Church of S. Maria degli Angeli and S. Giovanni Battista) probably from the last Ancient Roman centuries.

== History ==
The foundation, initiated in 1076 under Robert Guiscard, in the episcopate of Alfano I, occurred simultaneously with that of the Basilica of St. Peter Alli Marmi. The duomo was consecrated by Pope Gregory VII in 1084.

In 1688, the architect Ferdinando Sanfelice remodelled the interior of the duomo in the Neapolitan Baroque and Rococo styles. A restoration in the 1930s brought it back to an appearance similar to the original one.

The duomo is a symbol of the Italian Renaissance because inside is the tomb of Pope Gregory VII who rejected imperial domination of the church.

The building was damaged in World War II when, as part of Operation Avalanche, the Allies landed in Salerno in September 1943.

... special note of the magnificent main entrance, the 12th-century Porta dei Leoni, named after the marble lions at the foot of the stairway. It leads through to a beautiful, harmonious courtyard, surrounded by graceful arches and overlooked by a 12th-century bell tower. Carry on through the huge bronze doors (similarly guarded by lions), which were cast in Constantinople in the 11th century. When you come to the three-aisled interior, you will see that it is largely baroque, with only a few traces of the original church. These include parts of the transept and choir floor and the two raised pulpits in front of the choir stalls. Throughout the church you can see highly detailed 13th-century mosaic work redolent of the extraordinary early-Christian mosaics in Ravenna ... In the right-hand apse, there it is the Cappella delle Crociate (Chapel of the Crusades), containing powerful frescoes and more wonderful mosaics. It was so named because crusaders' weapons were blessed here. Under the altar stands the tomb of 11th-century Pope Gregory VII. ...

== Architectural features ==
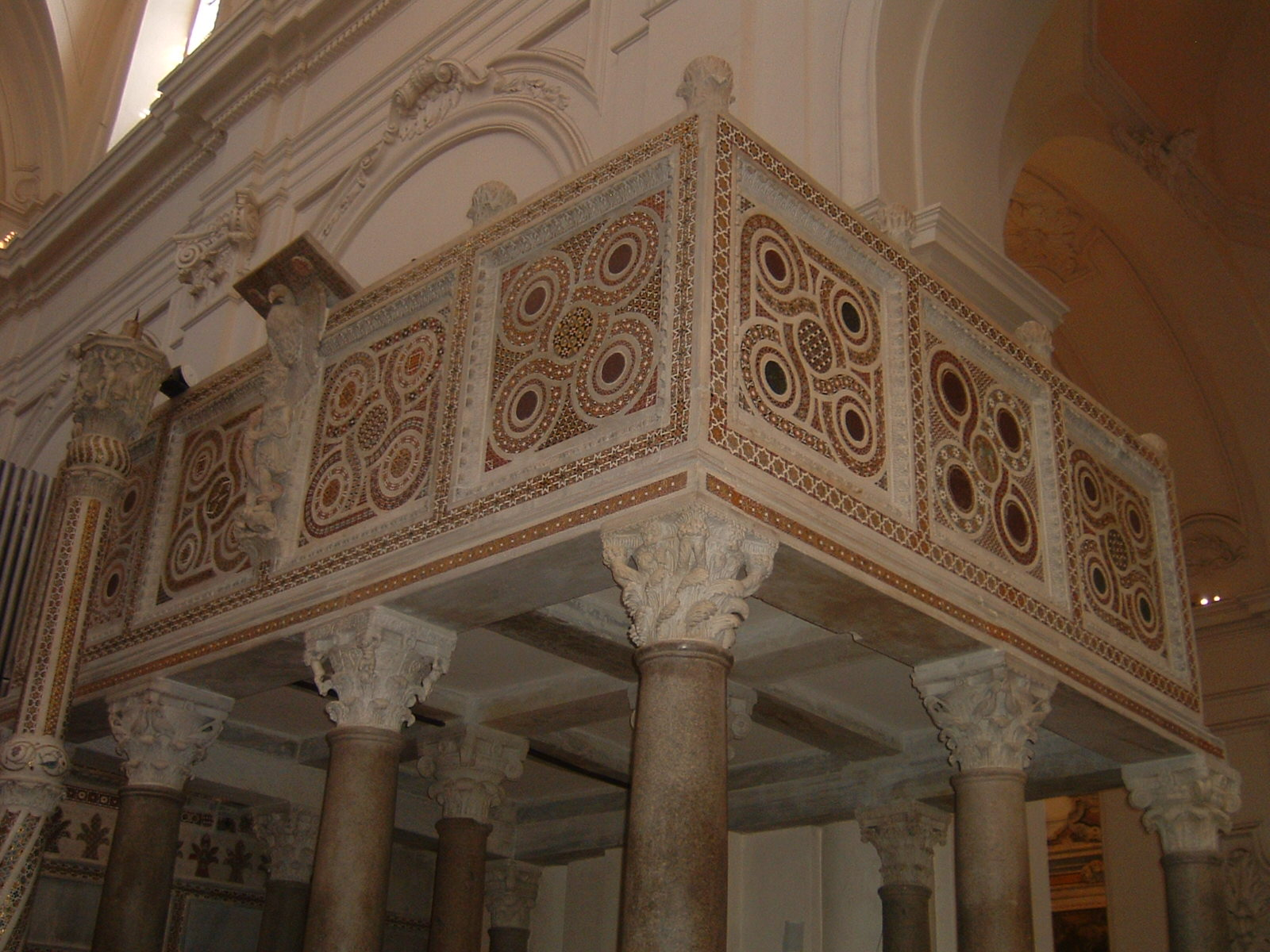
One of the pulpits

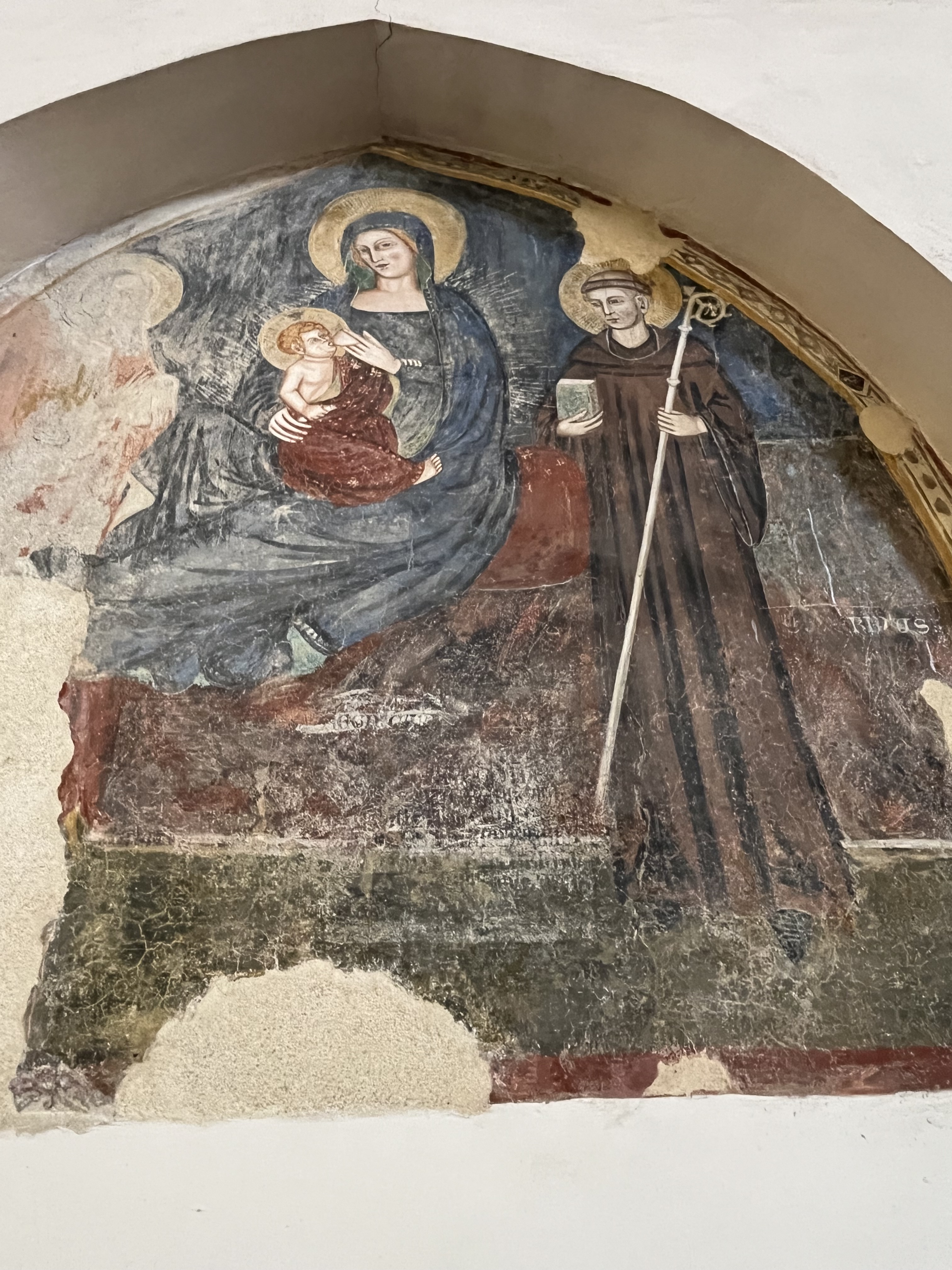
Madonna with Child

The most striking external feature is the bell tower (mid-12th century), with small arcades and mullioned windows, standing 56 m high and in Arab-Norman style. It contains eight large bells. The façade has a Romanesque portal with Byzantine-style bronze doors from Constantinople (1099), with 56 panels with figures, crosses and stories from Jesus's life. The entrance has a portico with 28 antique columns whose pointed arches, with lava rock intarsia, show influence of Arab art, and contains a series of ancient Roman sarcophagi.

The interior has a nave and two aisles, divided by pilasters in which the original columns are embedded, and three apses. Artworks include two pulpits with mosaic decorations, paintings by Francesco Solimena, a 14th-century Gothic fresco of Madonna with Child and the sepulchres of the Neapolitan queen Margaret of Durazzo, of Roger Borsa and of archbishop Bartolomeo d'Arpano, and the tomb of Pope Gregory VII.

The cathedral is visited by thousands of tourists from all over the world and has two important additional sections: the Duomo Museum and the Cripta with Saint Matthew's remains.

The Duomo Museum houses artworks from different ages, including the silver statues of the Salernitane Martyrs (13th century) and documents of the renowned Schola Medica Salernitana (the first university of Europe, according to some scholars like G. Crisci).

=== Crypt ===
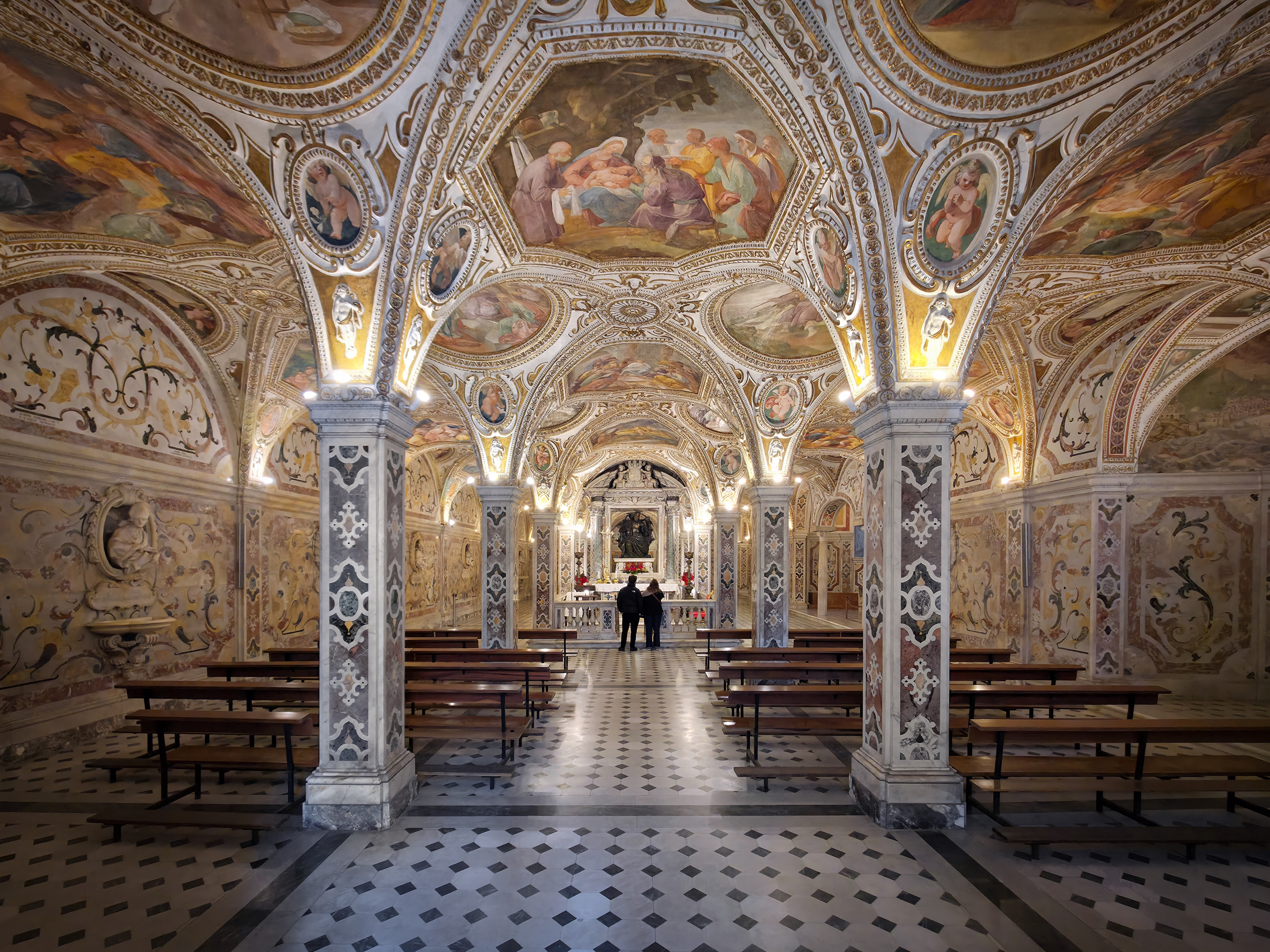
The cathedral crypt

The most famous and important section of the cathedral is the crypt, that contains the remains of one of the twelve apostles: Saint Matthew.

This crypt, with the remains of Matthew the Apostle brought there in 954 AD, is a groin vaulted hall with a basilica-like plan divided by columns.

It was restored under design by Domenico Fontana and his son Giulio in 1606–1608, with marble decorations added in the 18th century.

All of the ceiling frescoes were painted by Belisario Corenzio and depict scenes from the Gospel of Matthew, as well as some episodes of the history of Salerno (such as the siege of the city by the French).

Inside the crypt are the tombs of the martyred saints Caius, Ante and Fortunato, and of Saint Felice, with the remains of virgin saints Marina and Costanza.

The original remains of Saint Matthew can be seen inside a hole of the crypt's main altar. Until the 19th century this produced a special liquid called Manna San Matteo (similar to Saint Gennaro's blood liquefaction).

== Gallery ==
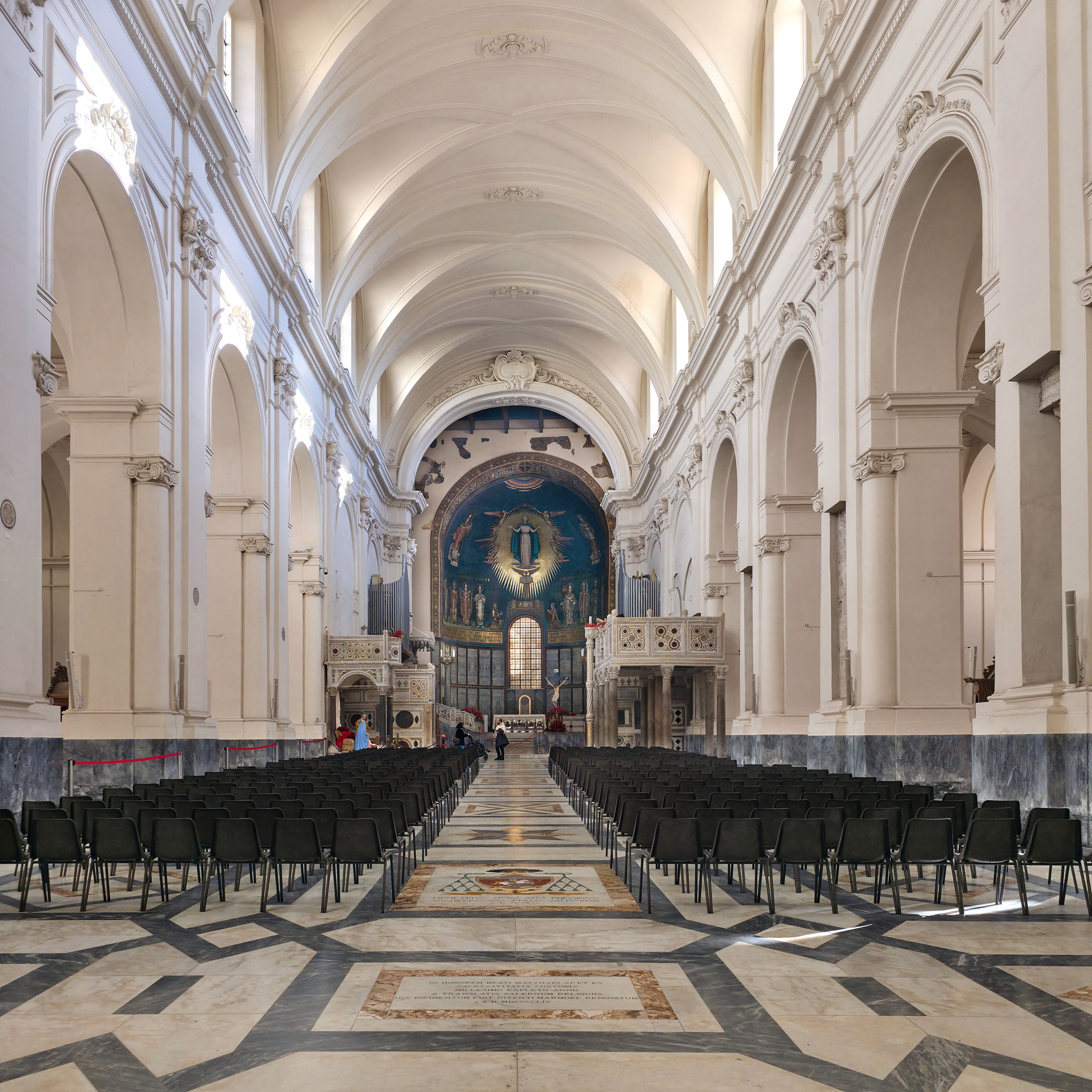
Cathedral nave

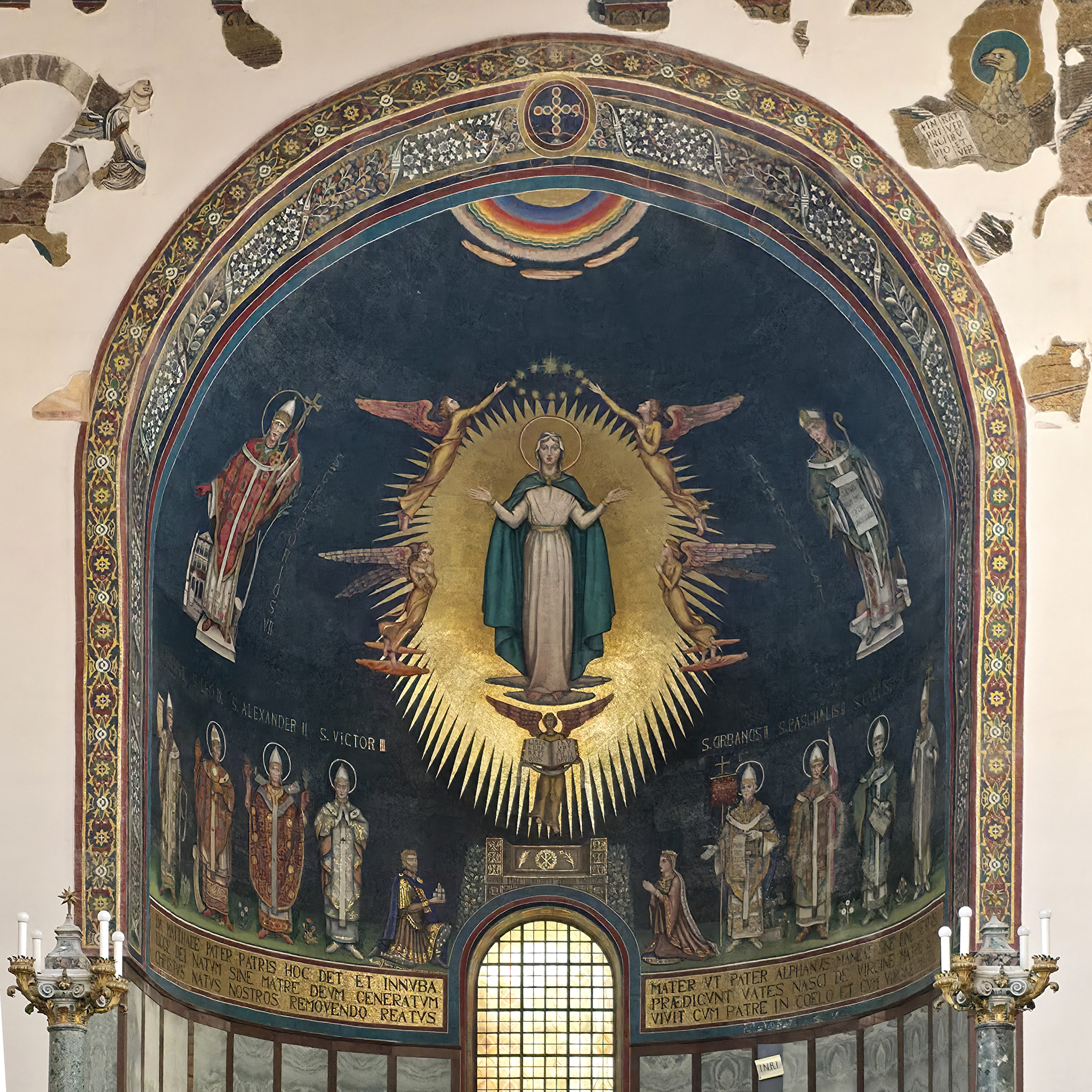
Cathedral main apse

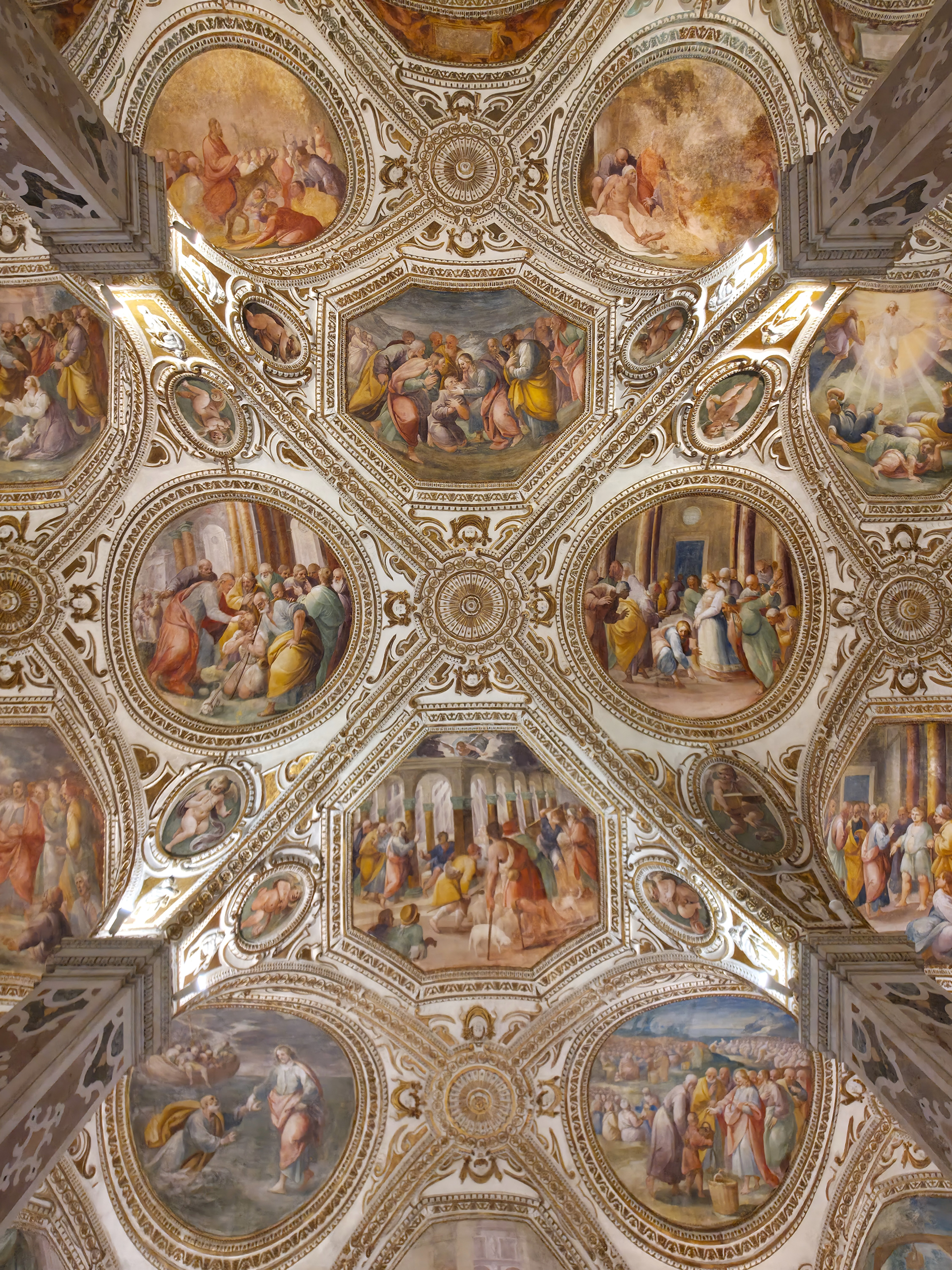
Crypt ceiling panels

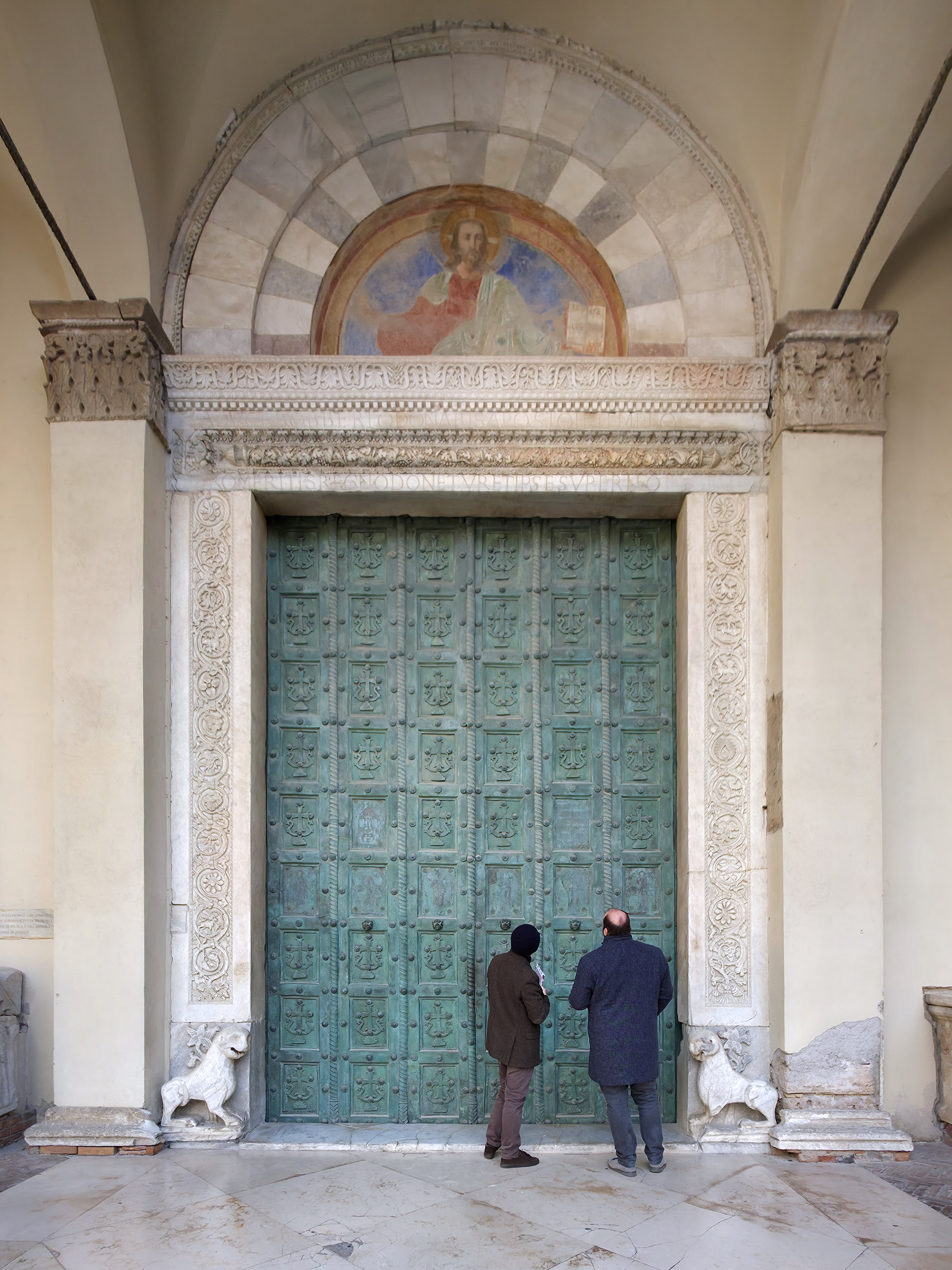
Cathedral doors

== Burials ==
- Margaret of Durazzo
- Pope Gregory VII

== See also ==
- Principality of Salerno

== Sources ==
- Crisci, Generoso (1962). Salerno sacra:ricerca storica. Salerno: Edizioni della Curia arcivescovile.
- Musi, Aurelio (1999). Salerno moderna. Salerno: Editore Avagliano.
