= Cadelbosco di Sopra =

- Comune
- Comune di Cadelbosco di Sopra
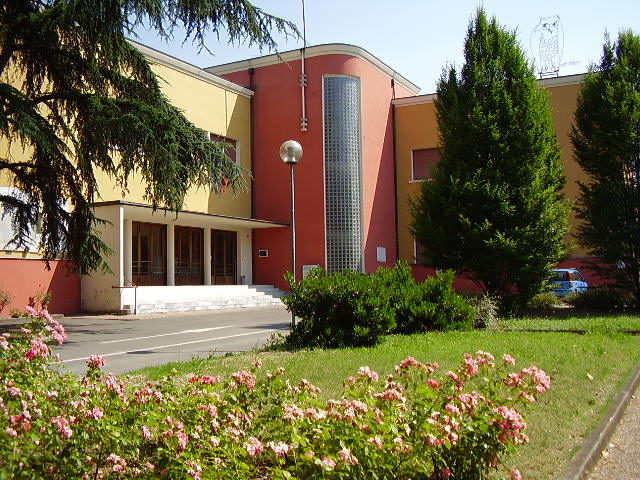
- Cadelbosco di Sopra Town Hall

- Location within Italy Location within Emilia-Romagna
- Coordinates: 44°46′N 10°36′E
- Country: Italy
- Region: Emilia-Romagna
- Province: Reggio Emilia (RE)
- Frazioni: Cadelbosco di Sotto, Villa Argine, Villa Seta, Zurco

Government
  - Mayor: Marino Zani

Area
  - Total: 44 km^{2} (17 sq mi)
- Elevation: 33 m (108 ft)

Population (31 March 2024)
  - Total: 10,713
  - Density: 240/km^{2} (630/sq mi)
- Demonym: Cadelboschesi
- Time zone: UTC+1 (CET)
  - Summer (DST): UTC+2 (CEST)
- Postal code: 42023
- Dialing code: 0522
- Website: Official website

Cadelbosco di Sopra (Reggiano: Cadàlbosch or Cà del Bôsch ed Sōver) is a town and comune in the province of Reggio Emilia in Emilia-Romagna, Italy.

As of 31 March 2024 the town had a population of 10,713, making it the eleventh largest comune in the province.

== Geography ==
Cadelbosco di Sopra is located in the Po Valley on the right bank of the Crostolo Stream, 8 kilometres (5 mi) north of Reggio Emilia, and about 72 kilometres (45 mi) west of Bologna. The town is contained between the SP63R del Valico del Cerreto road and the SP358R di Castelnovo road.

The municipality occupies an area of 44 square kilometres (17 mi^{2}) and includes the hamlets of Cadelbosco di Sotto, Villa Argine, Villa Seta and Zurco. It borders with the municipality of Guastalla to the north, Novellara and Bagnolo in Piano to the east, Reggio Emilia to the south, and Campegine, Castelnovo di Sotto and Gualtieri to the west.

=== Climate ===
Cadelbosco di Sopra has a humid subtropical climate (Köppen climate classification Cfa). Summers are hot and humid, with high average temperatures reaching 29 to 30 °C (84 to 86 °F), occasionally exceeding 35 °C (95 °F). Spring and autumn are usually pleasant, and unpredictable at times. Winters are cold, with moderate snowfall and high average temperatures of 4 to 5 °C (39 to 41 °F). Temperatures at night often drop to 0 °C (32 °F) and below. Severe thunderstorms can bring large hail.

== History ==
=== Origins ===
The origin of the area can be traced back to 900–950 AD, when the village of Vicozoaro emerged from the marshes and the thick woods. The village's name comes from the Latin words Vicus - village, and Zearius - a place plentiful of zea (spelt) - an ancient variety of wheat used to make bread. Sometime later, the castle was built, thanks in part to Lords Della Palude who were vassals of Marquess Boniface of Canossa, father of the Countess Matilda. The most ancient record in which the village is found, is a deed of gift drawn up by the notary Guidone on 6 April 1032 in the castle of Vicozoaro.

=== Middle Ages ===
In 1215 Gherardo del Bosco, the lord of the castle and the court, handed his properties over to the St. Prospero's Monastery of Reggio. In the 9th and 10th centuries, the courts were divided in three key parts: the house, the land and the communalia. The most relevant courts hosted churches and monasteries to provide assistance to the poor and the pilgrims. A few stable farm colonies were established and joined in farms or courts. The colonists also refined primitive dwellings, cattlesheds and warehouses. One of these colonies was the Roarolo, where the current Traghettino court stands. The other colony was the Boschetto. The first colonizers of the Roarolo were the Benedictine monks of the Abbey of Canossa, who had settled there before the year 1000. They kept the colony until 1219. As a result of some trade-ins from that year, the property went to the Benedictines of the St. John's Monastery of Parma, who lived there until the French Revolution era. The authors of the development and the land reclamation all around the village of Vicozoaro were the Benedictine monks, who deforested, broke up and levelled out the land with the support of the local laymen. The land soon became fertile and fruitful where the monks grew legumes, millet, barley, and cultivated vineyards, fruit trees and large farms.

For reasons unknown, towards the end of the 14th century the populations of Vicozoaro were forced to move further east, where the current town centre is located. The first houses that represented the nucleus of the future chief town, were built in the middle of the thick woods which covered the territory. Halfway through the 15th century, the name Vicozoaro had disappeared from the maps and had been replaced by Cadelbosco (meaning - "the houses in the wood"). The farming colonies of Roarolo and Boschetto were not affected by these migrations and were able to keep up with their usual operations.

In the early 15th century, the first church of the territory dedicated to St. Celestine was built. In the year 1442, the church expanded with a tower. In 1506, an extension was added to the front.

=== 16th–18th centuries ===
In this historical stage, except for the brief papal break from 1513 to 1523, the province of Reggio was under the heel of the House of Este until 1796. During this long period of development, Cadelbosco also suffered raids of troops and cattle raids in addition to lootings.

In 1557, Spain was at war with France and Ercole II d'Este sided with the French. In retaliation against him, Spanish troops burned and devastated many houses in Cadelbosco and the surrounding villages. Between 1570 and 1575, massive reclamation and plumbing works were undertaken on the Crostolo Stream to transport water from the streams of the mountains and from another river in the north.

In 1630, a serious outbreak of plague, described in the Italian's Alessandro Manzoni's The Betrothed, struck many parts of northern Italy. Cadelbosco was not spared, and 60 people fell victim and perished.

The production of the new church began in 1740 and was completed in 1769. The structure is adored even today.

The uproar provoked by the popular French Revolution in 1789, even though considerably delayed into Italy, made a huge impression. Public opinion was deeply shaken, as evidenced by the escape of Duke Ercole III d'Este on 8 May 1796. The Duke was frightened by the news that Napoleon Bonaparte, with his considerable army, was ready to invade Italy.

After the downfall of the House of Este, a provisional government was formed in Reggio. A Civic Guard was soon established to defend the city. In the ensuing Napoleonic period, there were conscriptions and seizures of horses, pasture and food, even though the bloodiest battles were still distant.

=== 19th century ===
In 1802, during the short-lived Italian Republic of which Bonaparte himself was President, Cadelbosco had the honour of obtaining the status of municipality. In 1814, with the falling of Napoleon's star, the dreams and hopes of many vanished.

After Napoleon's downfall and the Congress of Vienna's decisions, Reggio and Cadelbosco were reassigned back to the House of Este of Modena, led by Francis IV. One of the first acts of the new duke was the restoration of the old order and the downgrade of Cadelbosco to hamlet. There were years of hard reaction. A police state developed and freedoms were very limited. In the meantime, the population maintained a rebellious nature.

When the people heard the latest news of the revolution in Vienna in 1848, the seed of rebellion began to spread into the northern Italy, starting from Milan. The Duke of Este fled to Austria, and a new provisional government was formed in Reggio once again. The government began to recruit volunteers for the Piedmontese army, which had declared war on Austria.

The first War of Independence had a disastrous outcome for the Kingdom of Sardinia. They were defeated in crucial battles in both the first and second campaigns, and were forced to sign an armistice with the Austrian Empire.

Always protected by Austria, the Duke returned to Modena in August 1848 promising reforms and greater freedoms to citizens. His promises remained unfulfilled.

The following Second War of Independence in 1859, the Expedition of the Thousand led by Garibaldi who conquered the South which was ruled by the Bourbons and the occupation of almost all the Papal States by the troops of the Piedmontese Army, led to the creation of the Kingdom of Italy on 17 March 1861.

As suggested by Patriot Dr. Enrico Terrachini, Cadelbosco got its status of "municipality" by decree of the Governor Luigi Carlo Farini. The first mayor was Terrachini, who immediately established the first public primary schools in the four hamlets of the municipality.

=== 20th century ===
Many Cadelbosco citizens were involved in World War I, with 150 casualties in the battles.

Between 1919 and 1926, many areas in Cadelbosco, east of the Crostolo Stream, were involved in building the big drain Parmigiana-Moglia.

Italy entered World War II when they declared war on both France and Great Britain on 10 June 1940. The Tripartite Pact, signed in Berlin, Germany on 27 September 1940, united the Axis Powers (Italy, Germany and Japan). After the downfall of Fascism and the armistice with the Allies in September 1943, a number of partisan forces were formed to fight the German Nazis and the Fascist Italian puppet regime. From 1943 to April 1945, the whole country struggled under the bombing raids. Many bloody clashes caused death and ruin.

A memorial to the fallen in World War II was inaugurated in Freedom Square on 26 September 1965. The monument was created by sculptor Marino Mazzacurati.

== Main sights ==
- San Celestino. this church has a late Baroque style façade and a three-nave interior with vaulted ceiling and five altars. The altar-pieces of three side altars were painted by Lorenzo Franchi (1565–1632) and represent St. Anne - Our Lady of the Rosary and the Blessed Virgin Mary of Loreto. On the fourth side altar, which is dedicated to Our Lady of Life, there's a 16th-century fresco. In the sacristy there's an altar with a 16th-century wooden icon which was originally in the oratory of the court of Traghettino.
- Church of Annunciation, built in 1513 by Prince Ercole II d'Este. It still retains its 16th century original structure, apart from a few modifications. A new rectory replacing the original one has been built with the town council and parishioners' aid.
- Church of Villa Argine, dating back to the late 15th century and rebuilt between the 17th and the 18th century. It was designed by architect Pietro Ferretti. Inside, remarkable works can be found, such as an old 15th century fresco (probably depicting St. Cyprian and St. Giustina) and the 17th century Our Lady of the Mount Carmen. In 1996, an earthquake severely damaged the apse and the bell tower of the church that were later consolidated and restored.
- Church of Villa Seta, built after 1450.

== Economy ==
Cadelbosco di Sopra has a strong agricultural economic base inherently linked to food production and processing. Agriculture still plays a key role even if the total employment has been consistently declining. Crops grown include grains, wheat, pastures, vegetables, fruit trees and vineyards. Pig farming is an important factor for the local economy, together with cattle farming and poultry.

Industry draws strength from many sectors: food, construction, manufacturing, chemical, textile, apparel, household furniture, lumber and wood, electronic equipment, construction and plastic materials.

== Transport ==
The A1 motorway - the main north-south motorway linking Milan to Naples - passes about 7 kilometres (4.5 mi) to the south of the town.

Other major roads passing through or near Cadelbosco di Sopra include the SP63R del Valico del Cerreto, which connects the town to Gualtieri and the northern part of the province. The SP358R di Castelnovo connects with the nearby town of Castelnovo di Sotto.

Cadelbosco di Sopra has been served by railways from 1927 to 1955 when the connection Reggio Emilia-Boretto was dismantled. Now the town is served by two railway stations in Reggio Emilia. The nearest is the high-speed Reggio Emilia Mediopadana AV Station, about 7 kilometres (4.5 mi) southeast of the town. It was designed by Spanish architect Santiago Calatrava and was inaugurated on 8 June 2013. The Reggio Emilia Central Station is located near the town centre of Reggio Emilia, about 10 kilometres (6 mi) south of the town.

Frequent bus routes provide a direct service to Reggio Emilia and the near towns.

Cadelbosco di Sopra is served by two airports, Bologna Guglielmo Marconi Airport (BLQ) and Parma Giuseppe Verdi Airport (PMF). Bologna Airport is located about 64 kilometres (40 mi) east of Cadelbosco, while Parma Airport is located 32 kilometres (20 mi) west of the town.

== Culture and food ==
Cadelbosco di Sopra has a library, a theatre, several community centres and sports clubs.

The local Pro Loco organisation promotes campaigns, initiatives, farmers' markets, food and events.

The local fair is held twice a year, in April and September.

Traditional cuisine remains a strong part of Cadelbosco's identity, which takes its influence from Emilia-Romagna's authentic dishes such as tortelli di zucca, erbazzone, gnocco fritto, homemade pasta, zampone and cotechino with beans, pork and rabbit meat. Parmigiano-Reggiano cheese and Lambrusco wine are also a major part of the cuisine.

== Education ==
Cadelbosco di Sopra has a toddler day care centre, four nursery schools, two primary schools and a junior high school.

There are no high schools, so teens aged 14–18 mostly attend high schools in Reggio Emilia or in nearby towns.

== Sport ==
Cadelbosco has a local amateur football league team who plays its home matches at the new town stadium.

Tennis courts and an indoor swimming pool are open to the public.

== Sources ==
- Cadelbosco - Memorie storiche del can. Giovanni Saccani pubblicate in Reggio Emilia nel 1899 aggiornate dal nipote Arturo Panarari, Tipolitografia Emiliana, 1968
- Arturo Panarari, La Voce Democratica - Periodico dei lavoratori di Cadelbosco, 1957–60
- Giovanni Tadolini, Il Traghettino, Gianni Bizzocchi Editore, 1997
- Vito Fumagalli, La geografia culturale delle terre Emiliane e Romagnole nell'Alto Medioevo, in Le sedi della cultura nell'Emilia Romagna, Silvana Editoriale, Milano, p. 26, 1983
