= Boretto =

- Comune
- Comune di Boretto
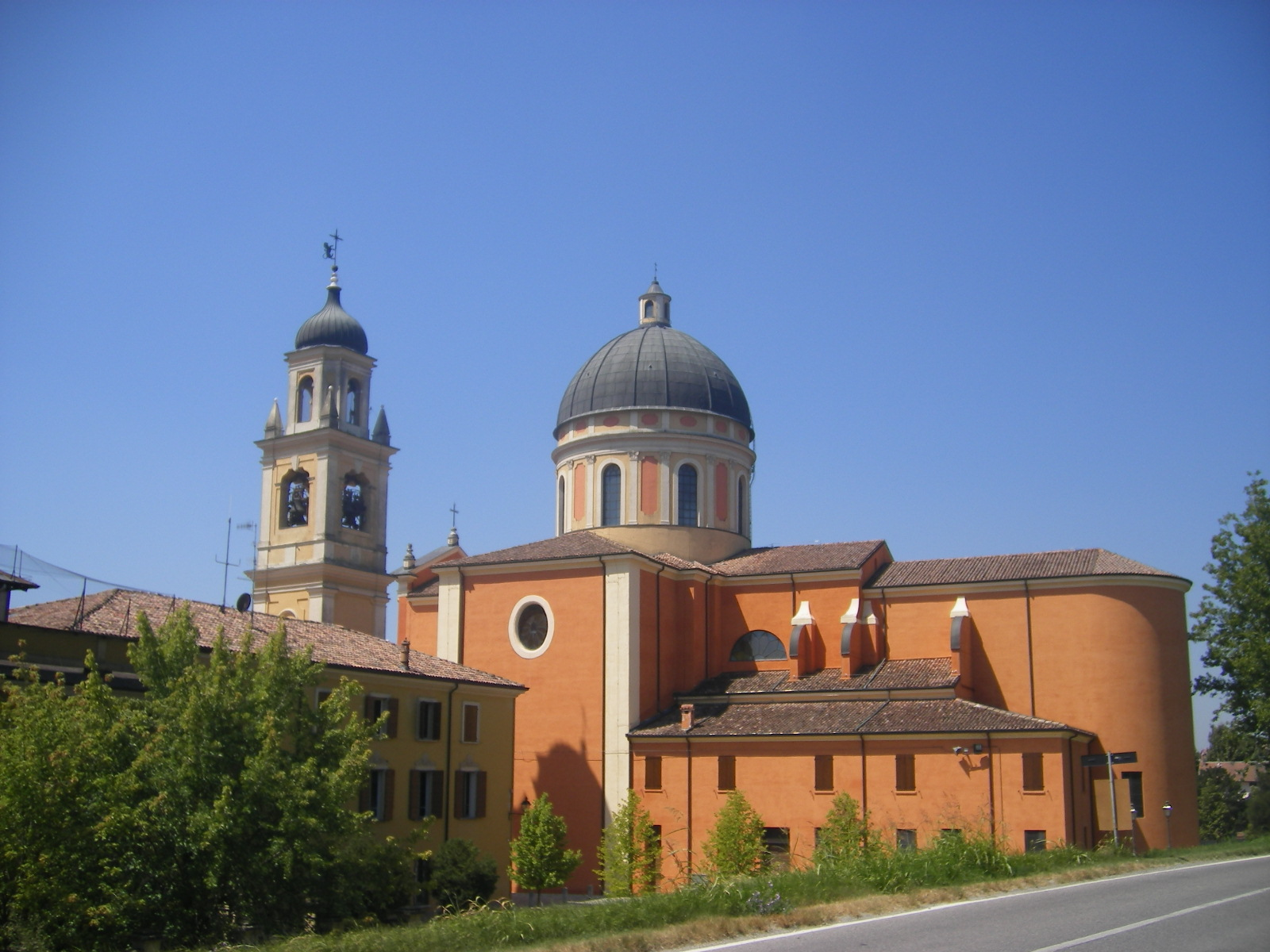
- Parish church of San Marco

- Location within Italy Location within Emilia-Romagna
- Coordinates: 44°54′N 10°33′E
- Country: Italy
- Region: Emilia-Romagna
- Province: Reggio Emilia (RE)

Government
  - Mayor: Matteo Benassi

Area
  - Total: 19.2 km^{2} (7.4 sq mi)
- Elevation: 23 m (75 ft)

Population (31 December 2016)
  - Total: 5,293
  - Density: 276/km^{2} (714/sq mi)
- Demonym: Borettesi
- Time zone: UTC+1 (CET)
  - Summer (DST): UTC+2 (CEST)
- Postal code: 42022
- Dialing code: 0522
- Website: Official website

Boretto (Reggiano: Borèt) is a comune (municipality) in the Province of Reggio Emilia in the Italian region Emilia-Romagna, located about 80 kilometres (50 mi) northwest of Bologna and about 25 kilometres (16 mi) northwest of Reggio Emilia.

Boretto borders the following municipalities: Brescello, Castelnovo di Sotto, Gualtieri, Pomponesco, Poviglio, Viadana.

Among the churches is the Basilica Minore of San Marco and Santa Croce.
