= San Celestino, Cadelbosco di Sopra =

Church building in Cadelbosco di Sopra, Italy

Coordinates: 44.7628°N 10.5971°E

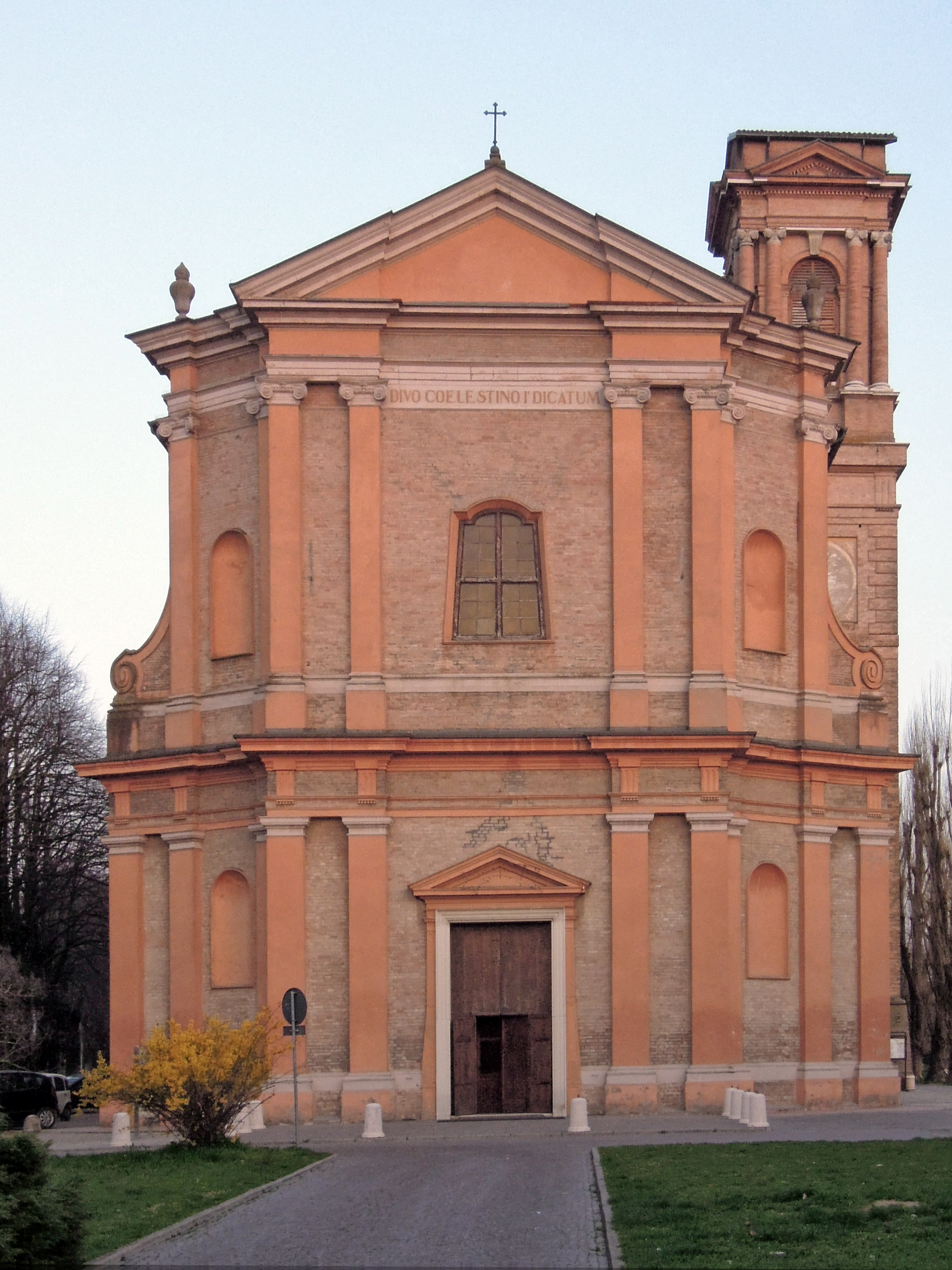

San Celestino is a Baroque style, Roman Catholic parish church located on Piazza San Celestino, in the town of Cadelbosco di Sopra in the province of Reggio Emilia, region of Emilia-Romagna, Italy.

== History ==
A Benedictine monastery was present near this site by 1103, including by then a Chapel of San Celestino. In the early 15th-century, the church of San Celestino e Annunziata was rebuilt, including a bell-tower (1442), and later a rectory (1459). In 1506, the church was elongated and a new façade added.

In 1530–31, another refurbishment occurred, adding the Chapel of the Holy Sacrament. Further chapels were added in the 17th century. A new bell-tower was present by 1637. Another refurbishment took place from 1755 to 1764, under the designs of Francesco Zanni. The presbytery and chancel were completed in 1769.

The earthquake of 1832 seriously damaged the church, which was restored the following year by Antonio Iotti. In 1890-91 and 1963–64, the church was again restored.

Three of the lateral altarpieces depict St Anne, a Madonna of the Rosary, and a Blessed Virgin of Loreto, and were all painted by Lorenzo Franchi. The fourth altar, dedicated to the Madonna della Vita, has a venerated 16th-century fresco.
