= Castelnovo di Sotto =

- Comune
- Comune di Castelnovo di Sotto
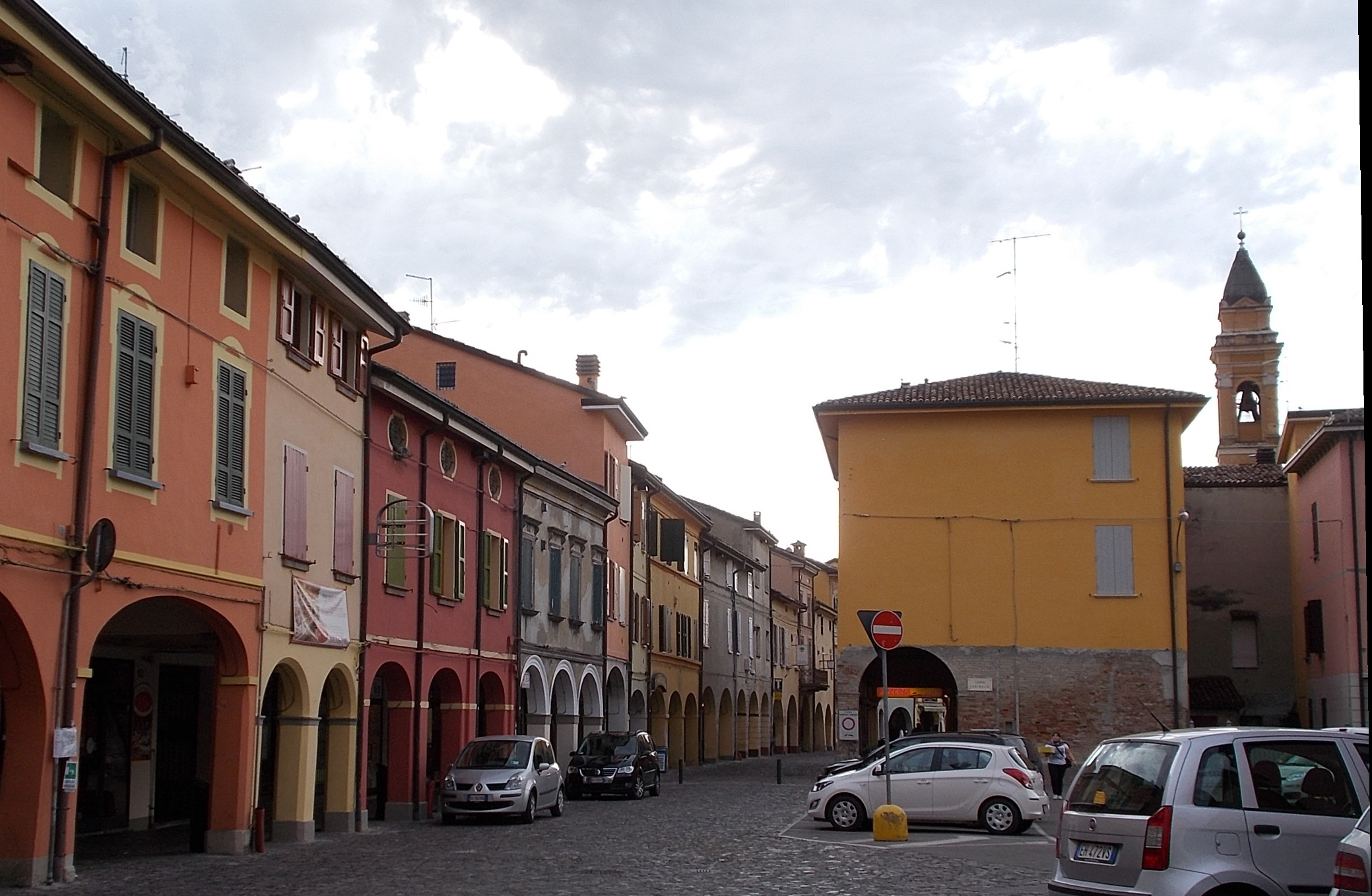

- Location within Italy Location within Emilia-Romagna
- Coordinates: 44°49′N 10°34′E
- Country: Italy
- Region: Emilia-Romagna
- Province: Reggio Emilia (RE)
- Frazioni: Meletole, Villa Cogruzzo, Case Melli

Government
  - Mayor: Maurizio Bottazzi

Area
  - Total: 34.6 km^{2} (13.4 sq mi)

Population (31 December 2016)
  - Total: 8,493
  - Density: 245/km^{2} (636/sq mi)
- Demonym: Castelnovesi
- Time zone: UTC+1 (CET)
  - Summer (DST): UTC+2 (CEST)
- Postal code: 42024
- Dialing code: 0522
- Patron saint: St. Andrew the Apostle
- Saint day: November 30

Castelnovo di Sotto (Reggiano: Castelnōv) is a comune (municipality) in the Province of Reggio Emilia in the Italian region Emilia-Romagna, located about 70 kilometres (43 mi) northwest of Bologna and about 14 kilometres (9 mi) northwest of Reggio Emilia.

Castelnovo di Sotto borders the following municipalities: Boretto, Cadelbosco di Sopra, Campegine, Gattatico, Gualtieri, Poviglio.

It is home of one of the most ancient carnivals in Italy, dating from the 16th century.

== Demographic evolution ==
Historical population

Year	Pop.	±%
1861	5,897	—
1871	6,119	+3.8%
1881	6,021	−1.6%
1901	5,674	−5.8%
1911	6,138	+8.2%

Year	Pop.	±%
1921	6,630	+8.0%
1931	6,580	−0.8%
1936	6,622	+0.6%
1951	6,452	−2.6%
1961	6,403	−0.8%

Year	Pop.	±%
1971	6,735	+5.2%
1981	7,129	+5.9%
1991	7,154	+0.4%
2001	7,810	+9.2%

Source: Data from ISTAT
