= Liceo classico Giovanni Berchet =

Coordinates: 45.4556°N 9.1989°E

Giovanni Berchet Liceo Ginnasio

Location
- Via della Commenda, 26; Milan, 20100; Italy

Information
- Type: Liceo classico, public
- Established: 1911
- Headmistress: Clara Atorino
- Enrollment: 561
- Classes: 27

The Giovanni Berchet Liceo Ginnasio (Liceo Ginnasio Statale "Giovanni Berchet") is one of the oldest licei classici (classical lyceums) in Milan, Italy. In 2011 it was recognized by UNESCO as Italy's top-rated lyceum for teaching quality, and on 7 December 2011 the City of Milan awarded the school a Civic Merit Certificate (Attestato di benemerenza civica) in recognition, coinciding with the centenary of its founding. The school has been located at Via della Commenda 26, in the historic centre of Milan, since 1911.

As of the 2025–26 school year the liceo enrolled 561 students across 27 classes. In the 2019 Eduscopio rankings, compiled by the Fondazione Agnelli, it placed first among state classical lyceums in the Milan area.

The school has a library of more than 25,000 volumes, two physics/anatomy classrooms, a chemistry laboratory, a mineral museum, a permanent exhibition of taxidermied animals, and a climbing wall. Student activities include an orchestra, a choir, and the school's own theatre company.

== History ==
=== Foundation ===
The liceo was established for practical reasons: the growth of Milan's bourgeoisie and rising secondary-school enrolment had made the city's three existing classical lyceums, Beccaria (founded 1810), Parini (1842) and Manzoni (1884), insufficient. Classes began on 24 October 1911, and on 13 November 1911 the Minister of Education, Luigi Credaro, inaugurated the new school building on Via della Commenda. By royal decree of 28 January 1912, the institute was officially named after the Romantic poet Giovanni Berchet.

=== Fascist era ===
In 1931, several students went to Via Durini to applaud conductor Arturo Toscanini on his return from Bologna, where he had refused to perform fascist anthems. Despite this, every teacher at the school except Mario Untersteiner, to whom the main hall (aula magna) has since been dedicated, joined the National Fascist Party.

Under the 1938 Italian racial laws, Jewish students and teachers were expelled from the school, including the physiologist Pio Foà and his children Enrica and Giorgio Foà, and the student Sonia Pacifici; a plaque in the school's entrance hall commemorates them. A former pupil, the lawyer and Resistance commander Leopoldo "Poldo" Gasparotto, was killed by German forces at the Fossoli transit camp in 1944; a bust at the school commemorates him.

In February 2011 the school held a commemorative ceremony, attended by Mayor Letizia Moratti, Cardinal Dionigi Tettamanzi, and Milan's chief rabbi Alfonso Arbib, at which symbolic diplomas were awarded to former students who had been denied the right to complete their studies under the racial laws. Since 1940 a section of the building has housed the lower secondary school "Luigi Majno."

Allied bombing of Milan in 1943–44 left the school building undamaged.

=== Postwar period ===
After an interim period led by Mario Untersteiner, Yoseph Colombo became headmaster, serving until 1967–68, a period the school associates with the moral and civic reconstruction of the Italian Republic. Three of the school's alumni later served as Mayor of Milan: Antonio Greppi, Paolo Pillitteri and Giuliano Pisapia.

In 1954, Luigi Giussani taught religion at the school; following seminars and meetings with students there, he founded Gioventù Studentesca ("Student Youth"), the starting point of what became, in 1969, the Comunione e Liberazione movement. The school subsequently became an important centre of Catholic-oriented culture and, as more recently, a site of debate.

=== Recent leadership ===
In September 2025, Clara Atorino became headmistress, the first woman to lead the school since its 1911 founding.

== Controversies ==
In April 2023 the school made national news over its dropout figures: in the 2022–23 school year, 56 students withdrew, a development attributed to "oppressive and despotic" practices described in an open letter signed by students and endorsed by representatives of several other Italian lyceums.

== Notable people ==
=== Alumni ===
- Luchino Visconti, film director
- Lelio Basso, politician and jurist, co-author of the Italian Constitution
- Antonio Greppi, Paolo Pillitteri and Giuliano Pisapia, mayors of Milan
- Lorenzo Milani, priest and educator
- Poldo Gasparotto, lawyer and Resistance commander
- Enrico Baj, painter
- Saverio Tutino, journalist and writer
- Andrea De Carlo, novelist
- Walter Molino, illustrator
- Oreste Del Buono, writer and editor

(alumni sourced to)

=== Faculty ===
- Mario Untersteiner, classicist
- Luigi Giussani, founder of Comunione e Liberazione
- Rosa Calzecchi Onesti, classical translator
- Pio Foà, physiologist (dismissed under the 1938 racial laws)

(sourced to)

== Website ==
The school's website, online since November 1998, offers students an email account and an online report-card service (pagellino) where they can check their academic progress. The school has also set up a local version of the Perseus Project, developed by Tufts University in Boston.

== See also ==
- Liceo classico
- Education in Italy
