= Francesco da Chiaravalle =

Most Reverend Francesco da Chiaravalle
- Bishop of Montefeltro
- Church: Catholic Church
- Diocese: Diocese of Montefeltro
- In office: 1444–1450
- Predecessor: Giovanni Sedani
- Successor: Giacomo Tebaldi

Personal details
- Died: 1450 Montefeltro, Italy

Francesco da Chiaravalle (died 1450) was a Roman Catholic prelate who served as Bishop of Montefeltro (1444–1450).

== Biography ==
On 20 Nov 1444, Francesco da Chiaravalle was appointed during the papacy of Pope Eugene IV as Bishop of Montefeltro. He served as Bishop of Montefeltro until his death in 1450.

Catholic Church titles
Preceded by Giovanni Sedani	Bishop of Montefeltro; 1444–1450	Succeeded by Giacomo Tebaldi
