= Mariano De Nicolò =

Italian bishop (1932–2020)

- Bishop of Rimini
- Church: Catholic Church
- Diocese: Diocese of Rimini
- In office: 8 July 1989 – 3 July 2007
- Predecessor: Giovanni Locatelli
- Successor: Francesco Lambiasi
- Previous post: Bishop of San Marino-Montefeltro (1989-1995)

Orders
- Ordination: 9 April 1955
- Consecration: 23 September 1989 by Rosalio José Castillo Lara

Personal details
- Born: 22 January 1932 Cattolica, Province of Forlì, Kingdom of Italy
- Died: 11 April 2020 (aged 88) Montetauro (in present-day Coriano), Emilia-Romagna, Italy

Mariano de Nicolò (22 January 1932 – 11 April 2020) was an Italian Roman Catholic bishop.

De Nicolò was born in Cattolica, Italy, and was ordained to the priesthood in 1955. He served in several offices with the Roman Curia. He served as a Papal Master of Ceremonies for the Office for the Liturgical Celebrations of the Supreme Pontiff from 1967 to 1984 and as Undersecretary of Pontifical Council for the Interpretation of Legislative Texts from 1984 to 1989.

Leaving the Roman Curia in 1989, Pope John Paul II appointed de Nicolò bishop of both the Diocese of Rimini and the Diocese of San Marino-Montefeltro in persona episcopi, and he was consecrated a bishop by Cardinal Rosalio José Castillo Lara. In 1995, Bishop de Nicolò left the Diocese of San Marino-Montefeltro, leaving it to Paolo Rabitti, whom he co-consecrated a bishop. He remained bishop of Rimini until his retirement in 2007.

He died in Monte Tauro on Holy Saturday, 11 April 2020, at the age of 88.
