= Luigi Negri (bishop) =

Italian Roman Catholic prelate (1941–2021)

Monsignor Luigi Negri
- Archbishop of Ferrara-Comacchio
- Church: Roman Catholic Church
- Archdiocese: Ferrara-Comacchio
- Installed: 1 December 2012
- Term ended: 15 February 2017
- Predecessor: Paolo Rabitti
- Successor: Gian Carlo Perego

Orders
- Ordination: 28 June 1972 by Giovanni Colombo
- Consecration: 7 May 2005 by Dionigi Tettamanzi

Personal details
- Born: 26 November 1941 Milan, Italy
- Died: 31 December 2021 (aged 80) Milan, Italy
- Education: Università Cattolica del Sacro Cuore
- Coat of arms

Luigi Negri (26 November 1941 – 31 December 2021) was an Italian Roman Catholic prelate, theologian, and academic.

== Biography ==
Born on 26 November 1941 in Milan, Negri attended the Liceo classico Giovanni Berchet, where he was taught by Luigi Giussani, among others. In 1965, he graduated from the Università Cattolica del Sacro Cuore with a degree in philosophy. On 28 June 1972, he was ordained a priest by Giovanni Colombo.

On 17 March 2005, Negri was named Bishop of San Marin-Montefeldro by Pope John Paul II, succeeding Paolo Rabitti. His episcopal ordination took place on 7 May in the Milan Cathedral and was led by Dionigi Tettamanzi. Fifteen days later, he officially took office in the Duomo di Pennabilli. On 1 December 2012, he was named Archbishop of Ferrara-Comacchio by Pope Benedict XVI. On 3 March 2013, he took possession of the Archdiocese in the Ferrara Cathedral. He resigned due to the age limit on 15 February 2017 and was succeeded by Gian Carlo Perego.

Negri died in Milan on 31 December 2021, at the age of 80.

== Works ==
- Persona e Stato nel pensiero di Hobbes (1988)
- L'uomo e la cultura nel magistero di Giovanni Paolo II (1988)
- L'antropologia di Romano Guardini (1989)
- Fede e Ragione in Tommaso Campanella (1990)
- Il Magistero sociale della Chiesa (1994)
- False accuse alla Chiesa (1997)
- Cristo destino dell'uomo (1998)
- Essere prete oggi (1999)
- Controstoria. Una rilettura di mille anni di vita della Chiesa (2000)
- Nell'anno della Trinità (2000)
- Il Mistero si fa Presenza. Meditazioni sui tempi liturgici (2000)
- Cristianesimo e Senso Religioso (2001)
- Ripensare la modernità (2003)
- Vivere il Cristianesimo (2004)
- L'insegnamento di Giovanni Paolo II (2005)
- Pio IX. Attualità & Profezia (2006)
- Vivere il Matrimonio (2006)
- Per un umanesimo del terzo millennio. Il magistero sociale della Chiesa (2007)
- Lo stupore di una vita che si rinnova. Spunti di riflessione sull'esperienza cristiana (2008)
- Emergenza educativa. Che fare? (2008)
- Con Galileo oltre Galileo (2009)
- Perché la Chiesa ha ragione. Su vita, famiglia, educazione, Aids, demografia, sviluppo (2010)
- Parole di fede ai giovani (2010)
- Fede e cultura. Scritti scelti (2011)
- Risorgimento e identità italiana: una questione ancora aperta (2011)
- Vivere il matrimonio. Percorso di verifica per fidanzati & sposi (2012)
- I Promessi Sposi nostri contemporanei (2014)
- Il cammino della Chiesa. Fondamenti, storia & problemi (2015)
- False accuse alla Chiesa (2016)
