= Carlo Visconti (cardinal) =

Italian Roman Catholic cardinal

Most Reverend Carlo Visconti
- Cardinal-Priest of Santi Vito, Modesto e Crescenzia
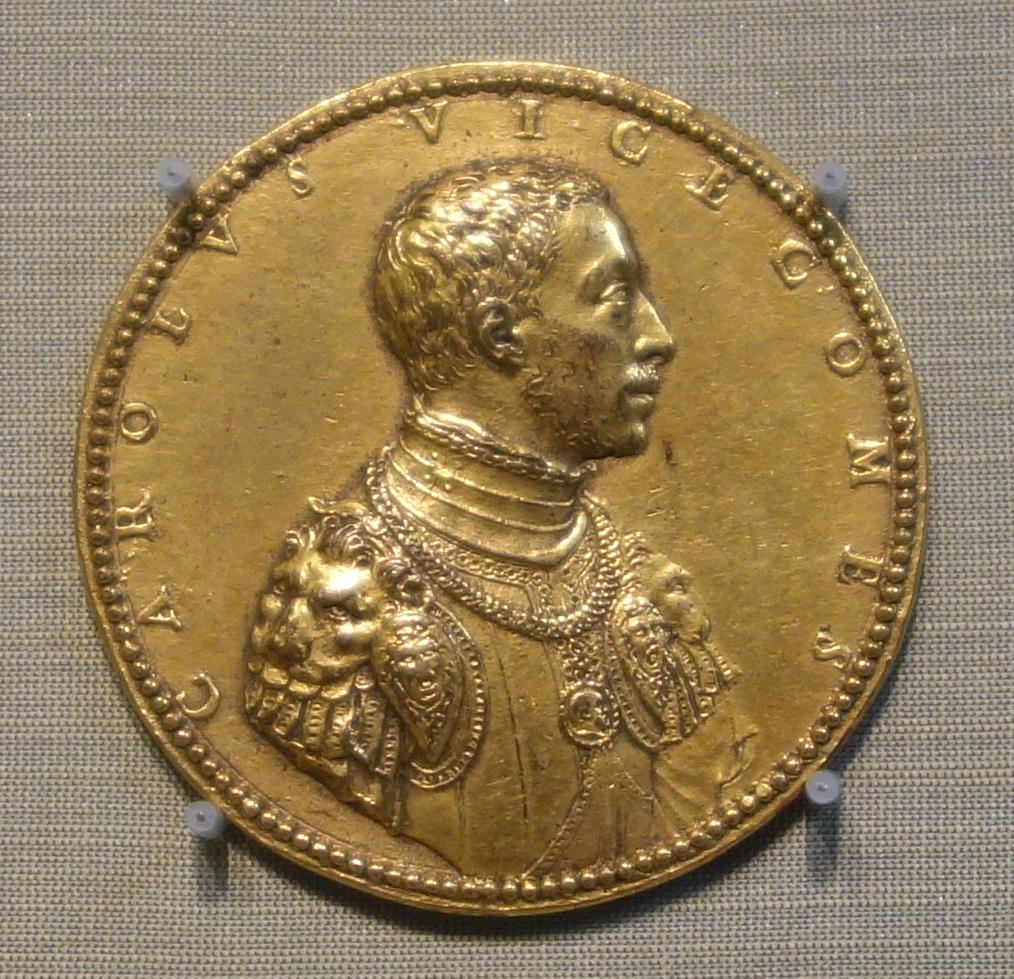
- Medal of Carlo Visconti, attributed to Leone Leoni
- Church: Catholic Church

Personal details
- Born: 1523
- Died: 12 November 1565 (age 42)

Carlo Visconti (1523 – 12 November 1565) was an Italian Roman Catholic cardinal.

Born in Milan, he was appointed Bishop of Ventimiglia on 5 December 1561, at the age of 38. On 12 March 1565 he was promoted to cardinal and was installed as Cardinal-Priest of Ss. Vito, Modesto e Crescenzia on 15 May. Just two months later, on 6 July 1565, he was appointed Bishop of Montefeltro. This term was short-lived as he died on 12 November the same year, aged just 42.

Catholic Church titles
Preceded by Jean Baptiste de Mari	Bishop of Ventimiglia; 1561–1565	Succeeded by Benedetto Lomellini
Preceded by Charles Borromeo	Cardinal-Priest of Santi Vito, Modesto e Crescenzia; 1565	Succeeded by Guido Luca Ferrero
Preceded by Ennio Massari Filonardi	Bishop of Montefeltro; 1565	Succeeded by Gianfrancesco Sormani
