= Basilica Minore of San Marco, Boretto =

Minor basilica church in Boretto, Italy

Coordinates: 44.9064°N 10.5536°E

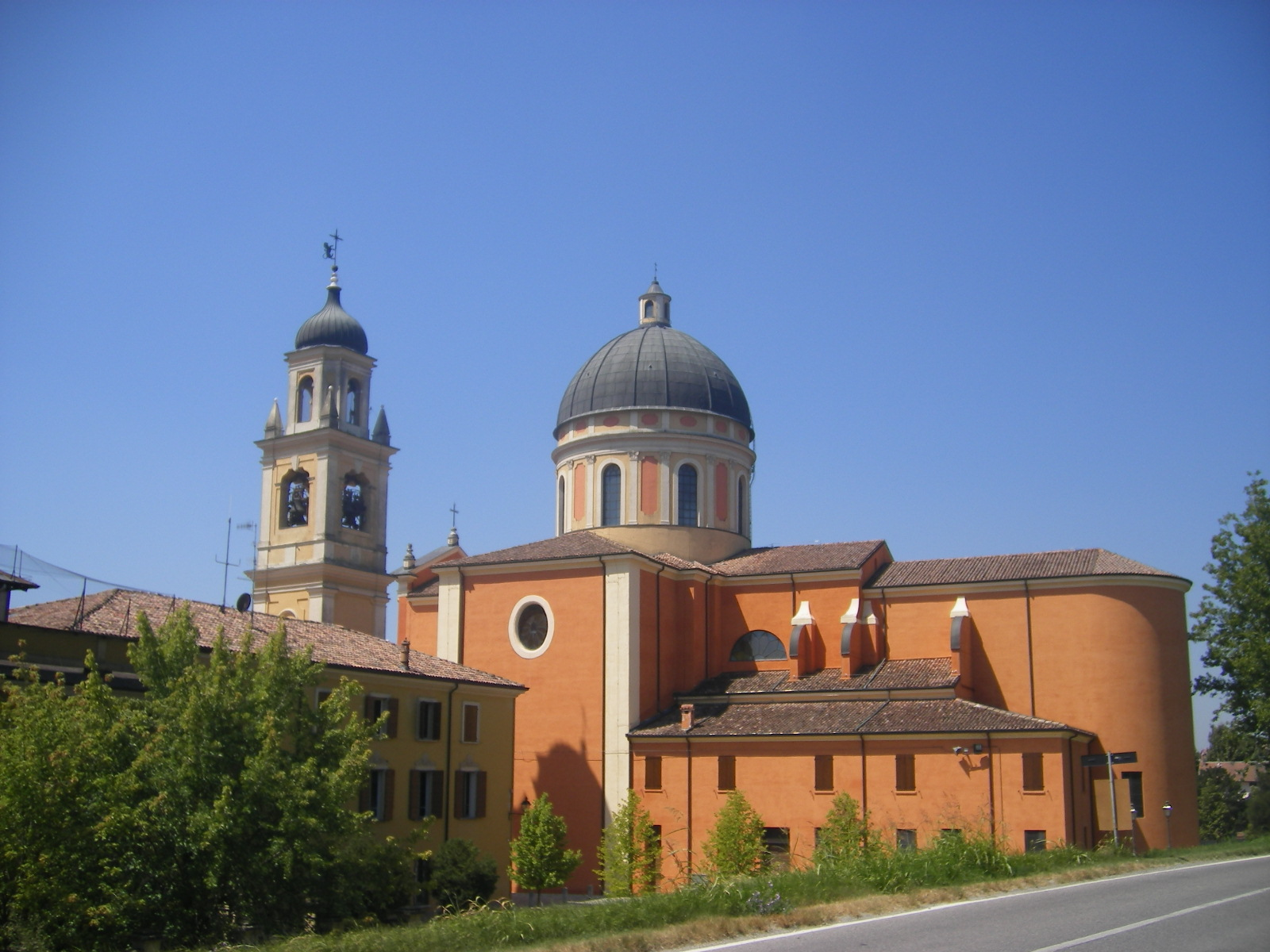

San Marco is a Baroque style, Roman Catholic minor basilica church on Piazza San Marco in Boretto, Italy.

== History ==
The present church was built 1871 and 1883, designed by L. Panizzi Moriglo, and granted the status of a Basilica in 1956. The cupola collapsed unexpectedly in 1988, and reconstructed using modern methods by architects Roberto Alessi and Antonio Raffagli.
