= Ennio Filonardi =

Italian bishop and Cardinal

- Cardinal-Bishop of Albano
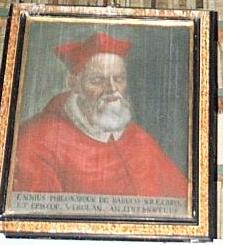
- Church: Catholic Church
- See: Albano
- In office: 8 October 1546 – 19 December 1549
- Predecessor: Gian Pietro Carafa
- Successor: Jean du Bellay
- Other post: Administrator of Montefeltro (1538-1549)
- Previous posts: Cardinal-Priest of Sant'Angelo in Pescheria (1537-1546); Bishop of Veroli (1503-1538)

Orders
- Created cardinal: 22 December 1536 by Pope Paul III

Personal details
- Born: 1466 Bauco, Campagna e Marittima Province, Papal States
- Died: 19 December 1549 (aged 82–83) Rome, Papal States

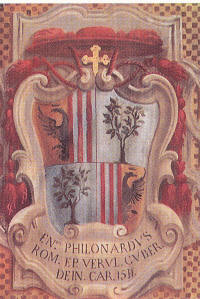
Coat of arms of Cardinal Ennio Filonardi.

Ennio Filonardi (1466–1549) was an Italian bishop and Cardinal. He was born in Bauco, present-day Boville Ernica.

As bishop of Veroli, from 1503 to 1538, he left an architectural mark on the cathedral. In 1538 he was bishop of Montefeltro; on 25 April 1549 he resigned as Bishop of Montefeltro in favor of his nephew Ennio Massari Filonardi.

From the time of his status as close advisor to Pope Innocent VIII, he became one of the salient figures of the papal court. He acted as papal nuncio to Switzerland. He became Bishop of Albano in 1546.

He died during the conclave that elected Pope Julius III, having himself been considered papabile. This is quite unlikely, since Filonardi was already eighty-three years old; he was not on any list of papabili provided by any of the Crowns; and he received not a single vote from the first ballot on 4 December to the day of his death on 19 December 1549.

== Notes and references ==
Catholic Church titles
Preceded by	Bishop of Veroli; 1503–1538	Succeeded by Antonio Filonardi
Preceded by Alessandro Farnese (iuniore)	Cardinal-Priest of Sant'Angelo in Pescheria; 1537–1546	Succeeded by Ranuccio Farnese
Preceded by Paolo Alessandri degli Strabuzzi	Administrator of Montefeltro; 1538–1549	Succeeded by Ennio Massari Filonardi
Preceded by Gian Pietro Carafa	Cardinal-Bishop of Albano; 1546–1549	Succeeded by Jean du Bellay
Records
Preceded by Roberto Pucci	Oldest living Member of the Sacred College; 17 January 1547 - 9 December 1549	Succeeded by Gianbernardino Scotti
