= Tebaldi =

Tebaldi is an Italian surname. Notable people with the surname include:

- House of Tebaldi, a noble Roman family;
  - Giacomo Tebaldi (died 1465), Italian cardinal
- Claudia Tebaldi, Italian American statistician and climate modeller
- Renata Tebaldi (1922–2004), Italian lyric soprano
- Tito Tebaldi (born 1987), Italian rugby union player
- Valerio Tebaldi (born 1965), Italian professional road bicycle racer

== Etymology ==
Derives from the Common Germanic Þeudobald, composed by *þeudō ("people", "feud", "community") and *balþaz ("bold", "brave"), and it can therefore be interpreted as "daring among the people ".

== See also ==
- Tibaldi
- Lungotevere dei Tebaldi, a Roman road dedicated to the House of Tebaldi
