= Umberto Tirelli =

Italian costume designer

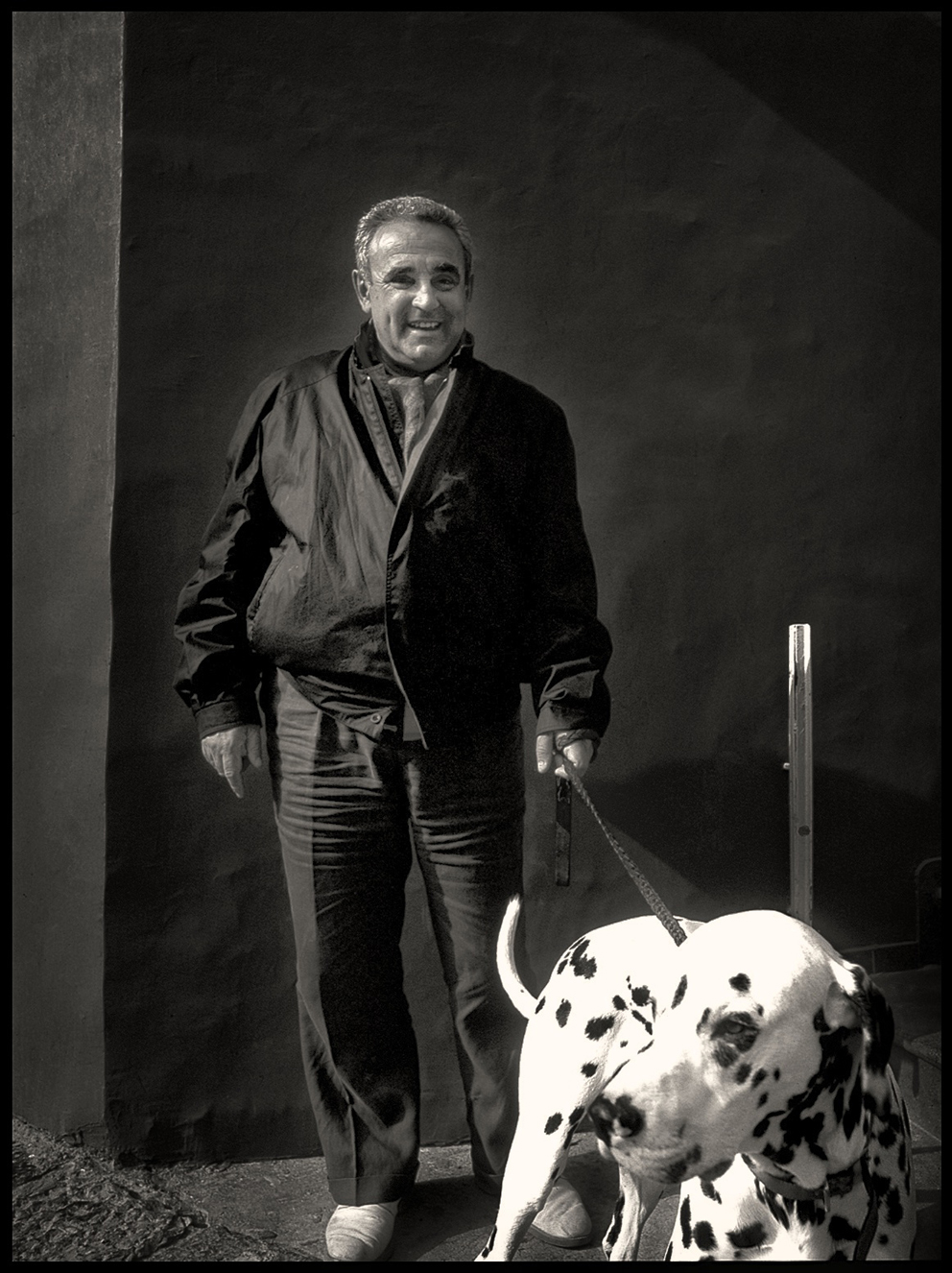
Umberto Tirelli in 1987, photographed by Augusto De Luca

Umberto Tirelli (1928 in Gualtieri – 1992 in Rome) was an Italian tailor, costume maker and designer, historian of costume and collector.

Tirelli was born in Gualtieri, a town in the Province of Reggio Emilia near the River Po. He was the oldest of four siblings and he spent his youth bottling wine with his father who was a wine and grains merchant. Tirelli initially wanted to become a teacher but the idea didn't last long. At the age of sixteen he discovered he had a love of clothing by frequenting the home of Luigi Bigi, a tailor who lived in the same town and who reproduced French fashion in Milan in the 1930s. In 1952, Giorgio Sarassi who, with Bigi's help, had made his fortune in the business of fabrics for high fashion, found Tirelli a job in Milan as a delivery boy and display designer for Marco, a fabric shop in Via Montenapoleone. Across the street was the boutique of Mirsa where Beppe Modenese, the future President of the National Chamber of Italian Fashion, worked at the time. Tirelli and Modenese decided to rent a place together in order "to survive because our pay was minimal," as Tirelli recalled in his autobiography, Vestire i sogni. (Dressing Dreams)

In 1955, at the age of 27 Tirelli was offered an apprenticeship by Pia Rame and Carlo Mezzadri, who had just purchased the theatre costume manufacturer Finzi. At Finzi Tirelli met Lila de Nobili, who was making the costumes for Maria Callas in Luchino Visconti's La Traviata, due to open at La Scala in Milan in 1955. He also met Piero Tosi, an Academy Awards-nominated costume designer who had worked with Visconti on Il Gattopardo and Death in Venice. Tirelli worked on La Traviata by making the costumes for the female chorus.

At the end of the 1950s Tirelli moved to Rome to work in the Sartoria Safas for the sisters Emma and Gita Maggioni. He stayed there until 1964 when he started his own business.

Over the following fifty years, Tirelli worked with some of the biggest costume designers, including Lila De Nobili, Piero Tosi, Pierluigi Pizzi, Luciano Damiani, Danilo Donati, Gabriella Pescucci, Vera Marzot, Gitt Magrini, Ezio Frigerio, Milena Canonero, Marcel Escoffier, Maurizio Millenotti, Carlo Diappi and Maurizio Monteverde. Tirelli's contribution proved to be essential in terms of philology of fashion, the recovery of age-old techniques, and the quest for authentic outfits. (He had a Collection of 15,000 items, dating from the seventeenth century to the days of Chanel and Dior).

An ardent costume collector, Tirelli defined himself as "a fashion archeologist". He used to say that he did "an archeological expeditions" every time he bought a costume. Tirelli's costume collection was used for cinema and theater. In 1986, he donated 100 authentic outfits and 100 theatrical costumes to the Galleria del Costume of Palazzo Pitti in Florence. Since his death, his sartoria has been run by Dino Trappetti, Gabriella Pescucci and Giorgio D'Alberti.
