= Bernardino Belluzzi =

Italian Roman Catholic prelate

Most Reverend Bernardino Belluzzi
- Bishop of Camerino
- Church: Catholic Church
- In office: 1702–1719
- Predecessor: Francesco Juste Giusti
- Successor: Cosimo Torelli
- Previous post: Bishop of Montefeltro (1678–1702)

Orders
- Ordination: 14 August 1678
- Consecration: 18 September 1678 by Alessandro Crescenzi (cardinal)

Personal details
- Born: 27 October 1642 San Marin de Montefeltro, Italy
- Died: 15 February 1719 (aged 76) Camerino, Italy

Bernardino Belluzzi (27 October 1642 – 15 February 1719) was a Roman Catholic prelate who served as Bishop of Camerino (1702–1719) and Bishop of Montefeltro (1678–1702).

== Biography ==
Bernardino Belluzzi was born in San Marin de Montefeltro, Italy on 27 October 1642 and ordained a priest on 14 August 1678. On 5 September 1678, he was appointed during the papacy of Pope Innocent XI as Bishop of Montefeltro. On 18 September 1678, he was consecrated bishop by Alessandro Crescenzi (cardinal), Bishop of Recanati e Loreto, with Domenico Gianuzzi, Titular Bishop of Dioclea in Phrygia, and Bartolomeo Menatti, Bishop of Lodi, serving as co-consecrators. On 25 September 1702, he was appointed during the papacy of Pope Gregory XIII as Bishop of Camerino. He served as Bishop of Camerino until his death on 15 February 1719.

== External links and additional sources ==
- Cheney, David M. "Roman Catholic Diocese of San Marino-Montefeltro". Catholic-Hierarchy.org. (for Chronology of Bishops) ^{[self-published]}
- Chow, Gabriel. "Diocese of San Marino-Montefeltro (Italy)". GCatholic.org. (for Chronology of Bishops) ^{[self-published]}
- Cheney, David M. "Archdiocese of Camerino–San Severino Marche". Catholic-Hierarchy.org. (for Chronology of Bishops) ^{[self-published]}
- Chow, Gabriel. "Archdiocese of Camerino–San Severino Marche (Italy)". GCatholic.org. (for Chronology of Bishops) ^{[self-published]}
- Marino, Giambattista (1758). Saggio di ragioni della città di Sanleo (in Italian). Pesaro: Gavelliana. pp. 222–224.

Catholic Church titles
Preceded by Giacomo Buoni	Bishop of Montefeltro; 1678–1702	Succeeded by Pietro Valerio Martorelli
Preceded by Francesco Juste Giusti	Bishop of Camerino; 1702–1719	Succeeded by Cosimo Torelli
