= Gianfrancesco Sormani =

Italian bishop

Most Reverend Gianfrancesco Sormani
- Bishop of Montefeltro
- Church: Catholic Church
- In office: 1566–1601
- Predecessor: Carlo Visconti (cardinal)
- Successor: Pietro Cartolari

Personal details
- Died: 1561

Gianfrancesco Sormani or Giovanni Francesco Sormani (died 1601) was an Italian Roman Catholic bishop.

He was appointed Bishop of Montefeltro on March 6, 1567, a position he held uintil his death in 1601. While bishop, he was the principal consecrator of Franjo Župan, Bishop of Kotor (1579).

Catholic Church titles
Preceded by Carlo Visconti	Bishop of Montefeltro; 1567–1601	Succeeded by Pietro Cartolari
