= Antonio Greppi =

Antonio Greppi may refer to:

- Antonio Greppi (writer) (1884–1982), Italian writer, dramaturge and mayor of Milan
- Antonio Greppi (banker) (1722–1799), Italian banker, merchant, politician and diplomat
