= Lungotevere dei Tebaldi =

Coordinates: 41.8949°N 12.4686°E

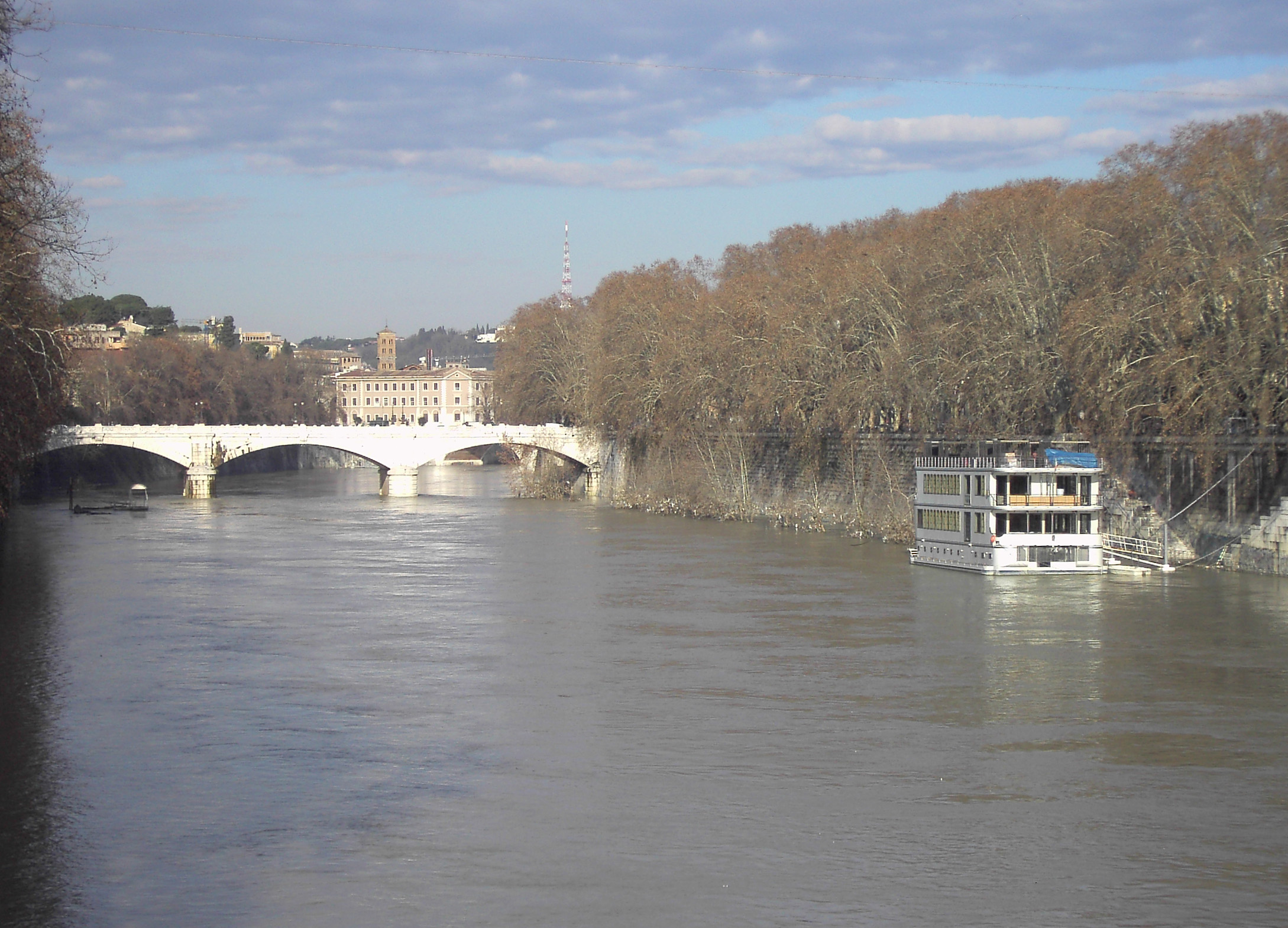
Ponte Mazzini; at right, the lungotevere

Lungotevere dei Tebaldi is the stretch of lungotevere which links piazza San Vincenzo Pallotti to ponte Giuseppe Mazzini, in Roma, in rione Regola.

This lungotevere takes its name from the Roman family of the Tebaldi, extinct in 1745; it was instituted with law of 20 July 1887.

== Sources ==
- Rendina, Claudio; Paradisi, Donatella (2004). Le strade di Roma. 3rd volume P-Z. Newton Compton Editori, Rome. ISBN 88-541-0209-1.
