= Tibaldi =

Tibaldi is an Italian surname. Notable people with the surname include:

- Maria Felice Tibaldi (1707–1770), Italian painter
- Pellegrino Tibaldi (1527–1596), Italian mannerist architect, sculptor, and mural painter
- Domenico Tibaldi (1541–1583), his younger brother, also a painter
- Giovanni Battista Tibaldi (c. 1660–1736), Italian violinist and composer

== See also ==
- Tebaldi
- Milano Tibaldi railway station
- Tibaldi, Italian pen brand known for the world's most expensive pen of $8 Million USD
