= Catholic Church in San Marino =

The Catholic Church in San Marino is part of the worldwide Catholic Church, under the leadership of the Pope in Rome.

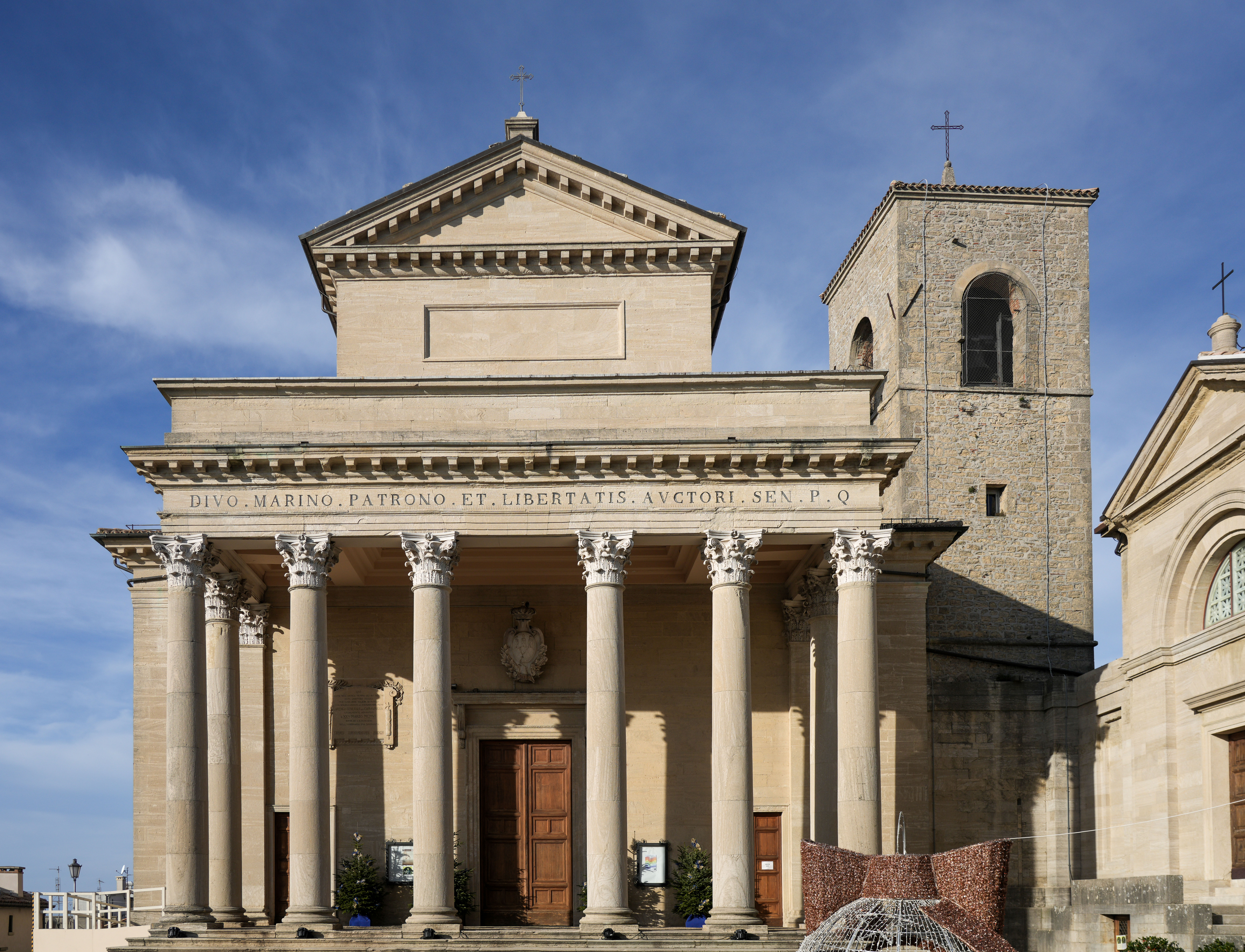
San Marino Co-cathedral

== Overview ==
San Marino is a predominantly Catholic state.

According to a 2021 report on religious freedom in the country, the population is 91.5% Christian. The country does not provide exact statistics of the religious affiliations of its people, but estimates in 2020 suggested that 85.45% of the population were Catholic, while 6% belonged to other Christian denominations.

In 2020, there were 19 priests and 21 nuns serving across 12 parishes.

There is no episcopal see in San Marino. Historically, the various parishes in San Marino were divided between two Italian dioceses, mostly in the Diocese of Montefeltro, and partly in the Diocese of Rimini. In 1977, the border between Montefeltro and Rimini was readjusted so that all of San Marino fell within the diocese of Montefeltro.

In 2023, the bishop of Montefeltro-San Marino is Andrea Turazzi, and he resides in Pennabilli, in Italy.

== Parishes ==
There are several parishes in the Republic, including:

- St. Andrew the Apostle Parish in Acquaviva.
- St. Antimo and Marino Borgo Maggiore.
- St. John the Baptist in Chiesanuova.
- Mary Help of Christians in Customs.
- St. Michael the Archangel in Domagnano.
- St. Paul the Apostle in Faetano.
- St. Peter the Apostle Parish in Falciano.
- St. Bartholomew the Apostle Parish in Florence.
- San Lorenzo in Montegiardino.
- St. Andrew the Apostle Parish in Serravalle.
- San Giovanni Sotto Le Penne.
- Saints Peter and Leo Marino in San Marino City.

== Religious organizations ==
Many Catholic organizations exist, including:

- Company of Sacramento in the Parish of Acquaviva.
- Legato Sabbaton in the Parish of Acquaviva.
- Society of Our Lady of Consolation Parish in Borgo Maggiore.
- Company of the Cross in the Parish of Borgo Maggiore Borgo Maggiore.
- San Rocco Cailungo benefit in the Parish of Borgo Maggiore.
- Compagnia del Sacramento in the Parish of SS.mo Chiesanuova.
- Compagnia del Sacramento in the Parish of SS.mo Domagnano.
- Pauline Chapel in the Parish of Domagnano.
- Fellowship in the Parish of Sacramento SS.mo Faetano.
- Fellowship in the Parish of Sacramento SS.mo Fiorentino.
- Society of St. Rosario nella Parrocchia di Fiorentino.
- Compagnia del Sacramento in the Parish of SS.mo Montegiardino.
- Chapel in the Parish of Montegiardino Micheloni.
- Chapel in the Parish of Montegiardino Piccioni.
- Company of Sacramento in the Parish of Serravalle.
- Company of the crucifix in the parish of Serravalle Serravalle.
- Company of the Holy Rosary Parish in Serravalle.
- Chapel in the parish of San Giovanni Sotto Le Penne.
- Our Lady of Mount Caramel Society in San Marino City.
- Company Madonna di Ca 'Centino in San Marino City.
- Company of Sacramento, San Marino.
- Bonetti Chapel in San Marino City.
- San Rocco Piaggio San Marino City.
- Opera San Marino Catholic Care.
- San Francesco convent of Friars Minor Conventual in San Marino City.
- Convent of the Friars Minor Capuchin in San Marino City.
- Monastery Santa Maria dei Servi in Valdragone.
- Casa San Giuseppe dei Frati Minori Valdragone.
- Monastero di Santa Chiara in Valdragone.
- Institute of Our Religious Teachers.
- Guard of Honour of the Immaculate Heart of Mary.
- Salesians of Don Bosco.

== See also ==
- Religion in San Marino
