= Ennio Massari Filonardi =

Most Reverend Ennio Massari Filonardi
- Bishop of Montefeltro
- Church: Catholic Church
- In office: 1549–1565
- Predecessor: Ennio Filonardi
- Successor: Carlo Visconti (cardinal)

Personal details
- Died: 1565

Ennio Massari Filonardi (died 1565) was a Roman Catholic prelate who served as Bishop of Montefeltro (1549–1565).

== Biography ==
On 29 April 1549, Ennio Massari Filonardi was appointed during the papacy of Pope Paul III as Bishop of Montefeltro succeeding his uncle, Cardinal Ennio Filonardi. He served as Bishop of Montefeltro until his death in 1565.

== External links and additional sources ==
- Cheney, David M. "Roman Catholic Diocese of San Marino-Montefeltro". Catholic-Hierarchy.org. (for Chronology of Bishops) ^{[self-published]}
- Chow, Gabriel. "Diocese of San Marino-Montefeltro (Italy)". GCatholic.org. (for Chronology of Bishops) ^{[self-published]}

Catholic Church titles
| Preceded by Ennio Filonardi | Bishop of Montefeltro; 1549–1565 | Succeeded by Carlo Visconti (cardinal) |
