= San Leo Cathedral =

Cathedral in San Leo, Italy

Coordinates: 43.8971°N 12.3425°E

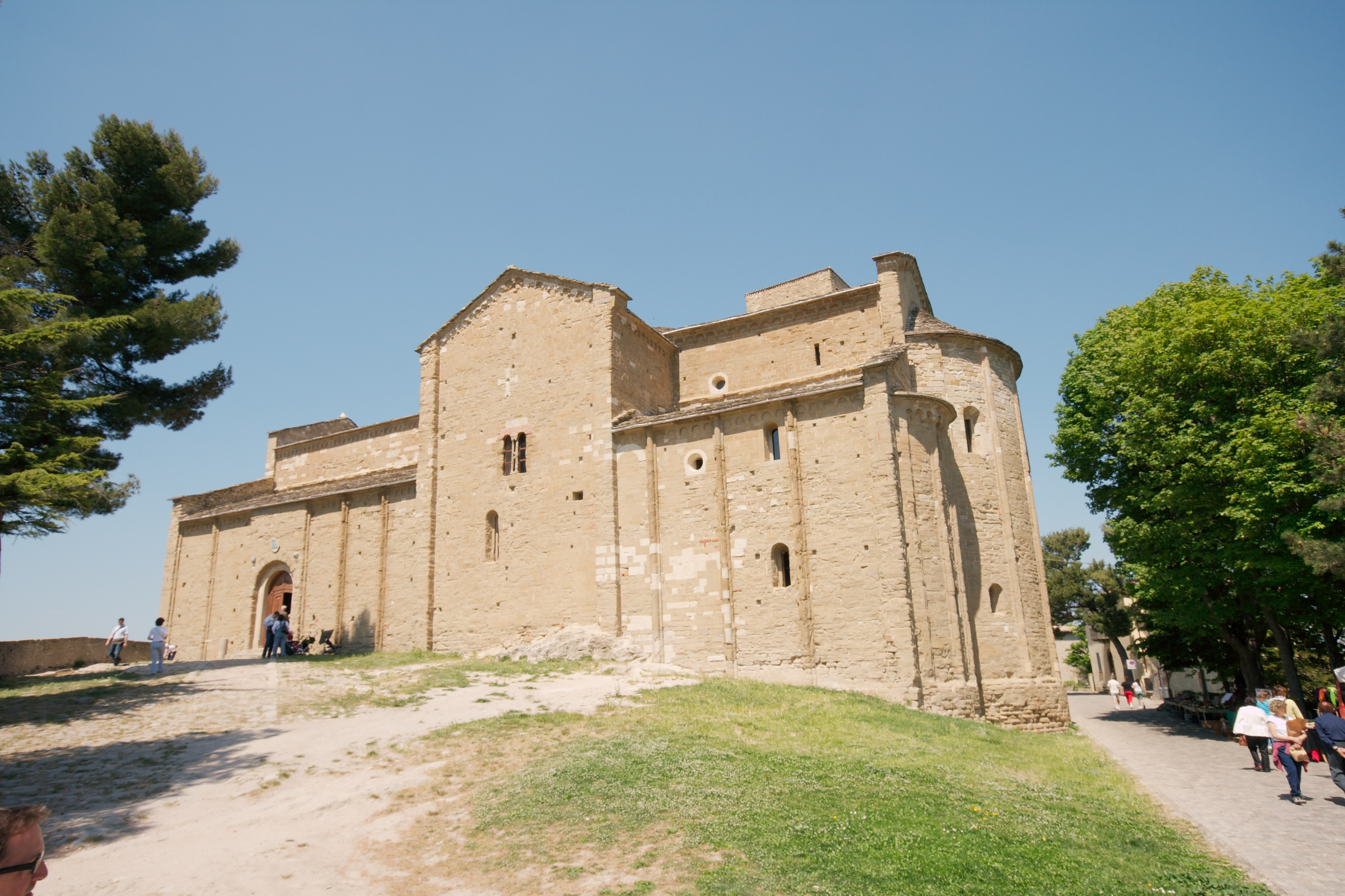
Cathedral from the south

San Leo Cathedral (Italian: Duomo di San Leo) is the Romanesque cathedral of San Leo, a municipality in the province of Rimini, region of Emilia-Romagna, Italy.

== History ==
A church was established on the site in the 7th century when the town became the seat of the diocese of Montefeltro. It was dedicated to Saint Leo or Leone, a local hermit. In the 12th century, a new cathedral was erected, with an inscription still in the church dating its reconsecration to 1173.

The cathedral holds the relics of Saint Leo. The entrance portal has two busts of Saints Leo and Valentino. A number of the capitals have Romanesque carvings.

== Interior views ==
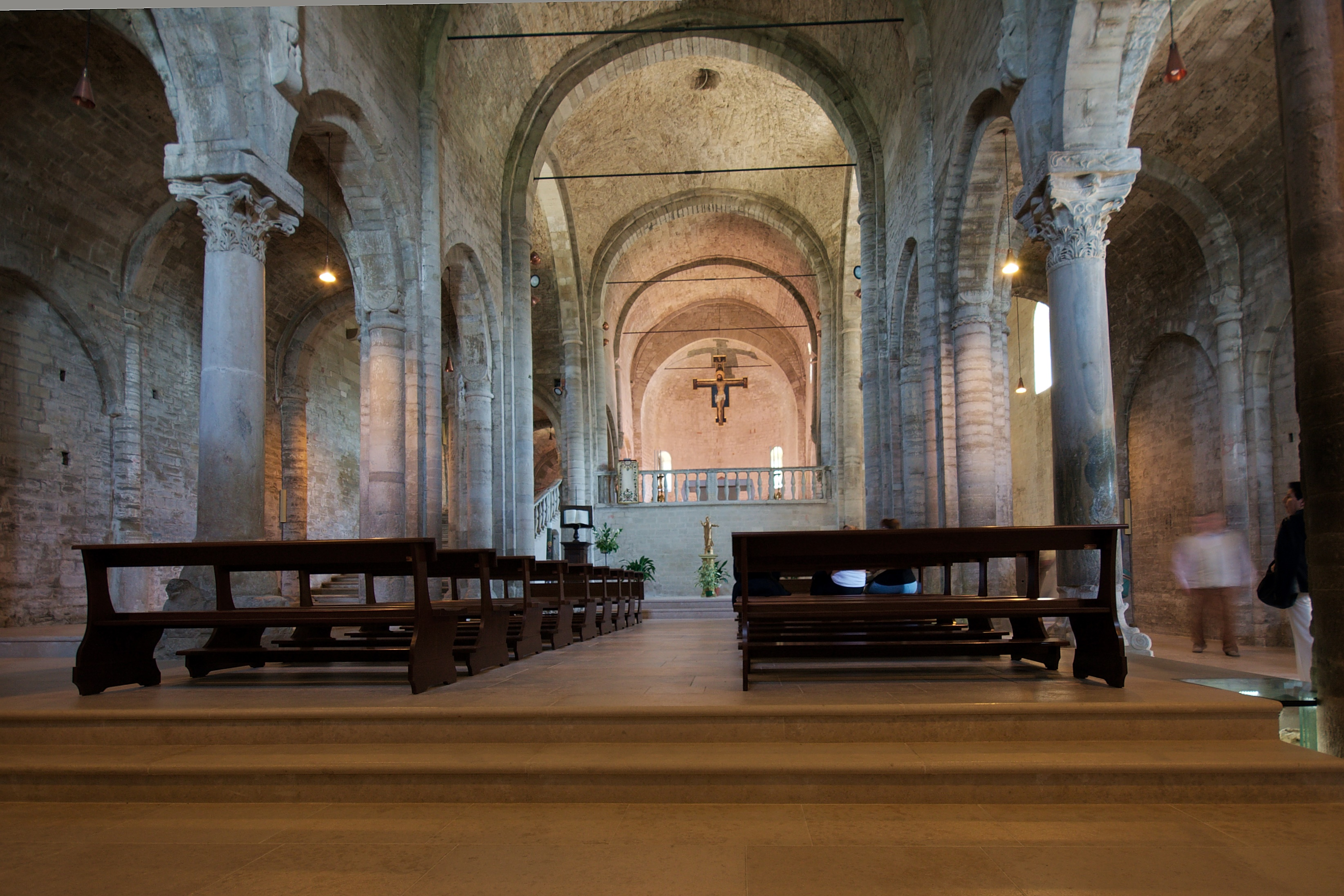

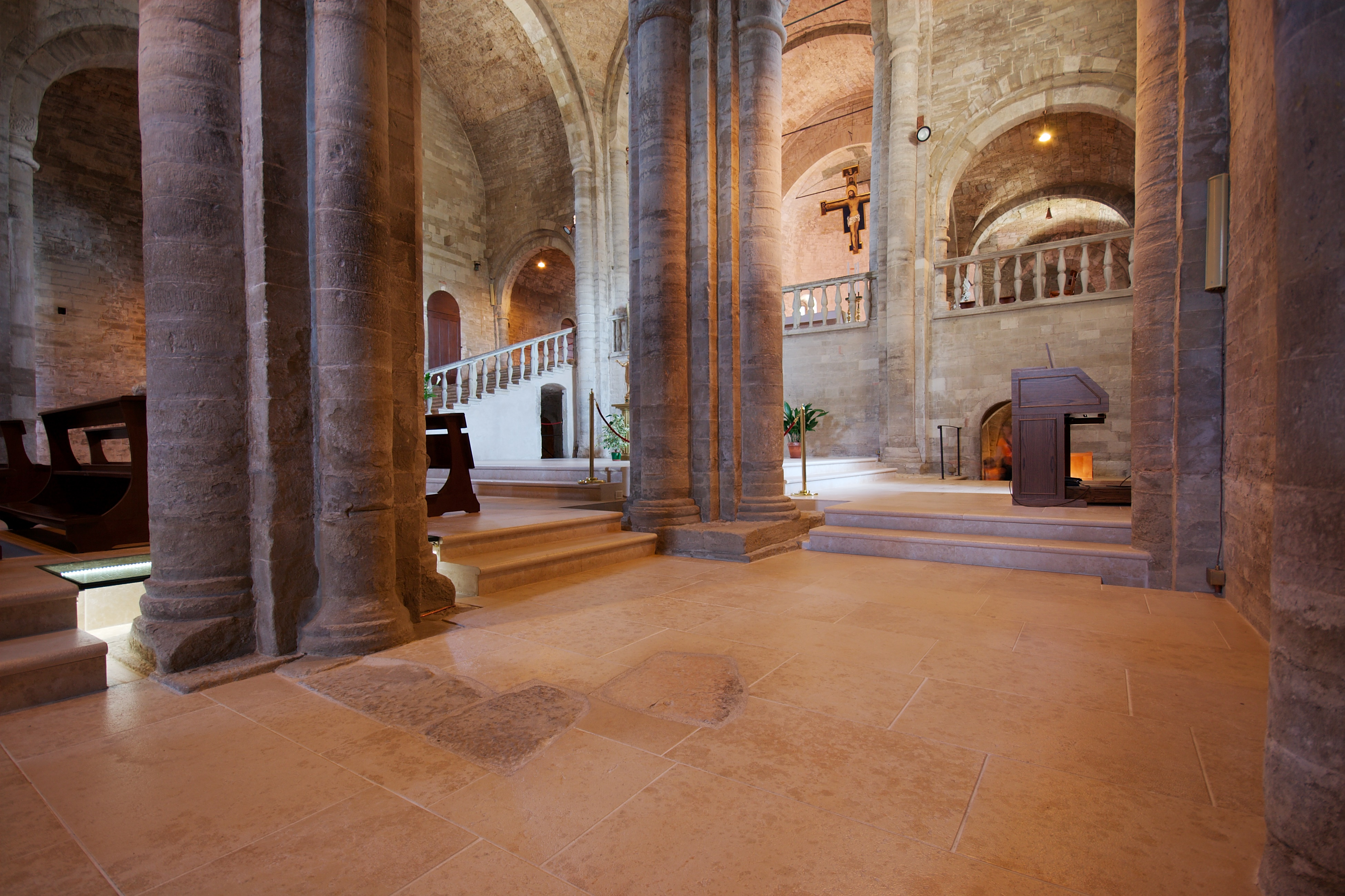
