= Giovanni Locatelli =

Giovanni Locatelli may refer to:

- Giovanni Battista Locatelli (opera director) (1713–1785), Italian opera director
- Giovanni Battista Locatelli (sculptor) (1734-1805)
- Giovanni Locatelli (bishop) in Roman Catholic Diocese of San Marino-Montefeltro
