= Santa Croce, Boretto =

Church building in Boretto, Italy

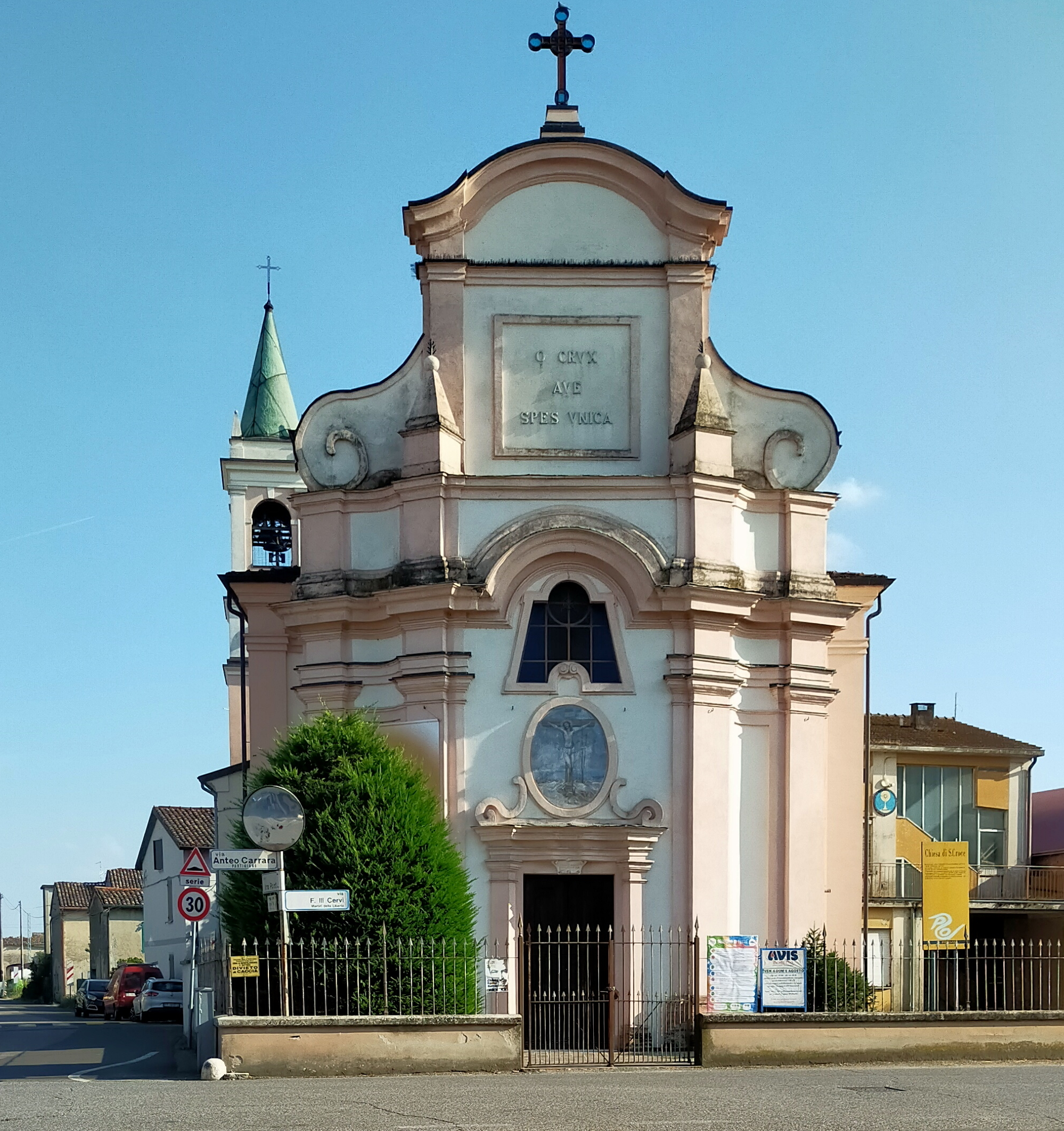

Santa Croce is a Baroque style, Roman Catholic church located on Via Fratelli Cervi in the town of Boretto in the region of Emilia-Romagna, Italy.

== History ==
The present church was erected at the site of an older Franciscan church that had an adjacent monastery. In 1716, after many previous tries, the community of Villa Arzenago (former name of Boretto) obtained permission from Rinaldo III of Modena to erect a church dedicated to the adoration of the True Cross. It is said the church has relics of the true cross. The vertical sweep of the facade is striking and the interior has a restrained late-baroque decoration.
