= Diocese of San Marino-Montefeltro =

Latin Catholic diocese in Italy and San Marino

Coordinates: 43.8172°N 12.2655°E

Diocese of San Marino-Montefeltro Dioecesis Sammarinensis-Feretrana Diocesi di San Marino-Montefeltro

Catholic
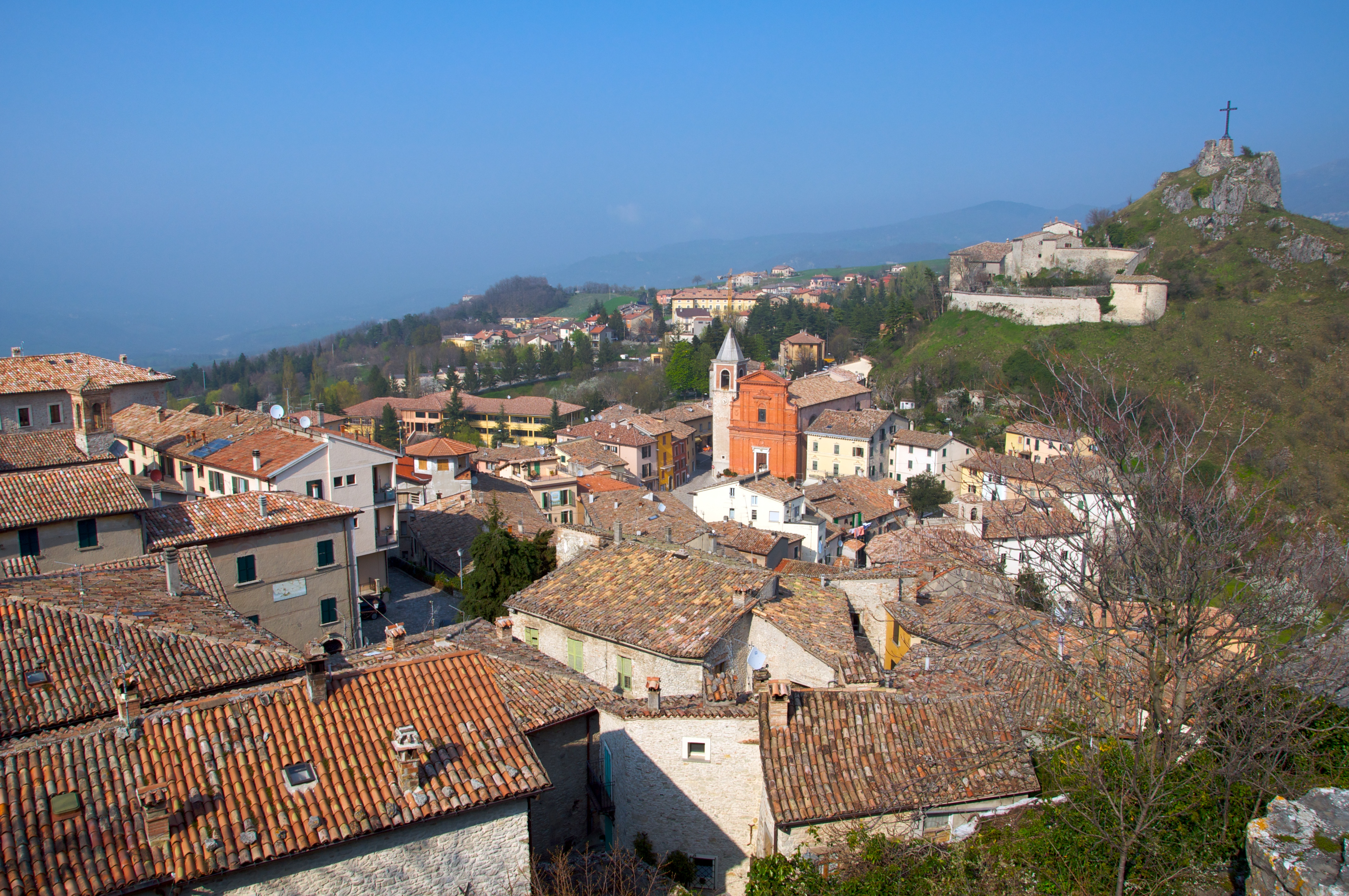
- Pennabilli Cathedral

Location
- Country: Italy and San Marino
- Ecclesiastical province: Ravenna-Cervia

Statistics
- Area: 800 km^{2} (310 sq mi)
- Population: Total; Catholics: (as of 2023); 65,608 ▼; 59,879 ▼ (91.3%)
- Parishes: 81

Information
- Denomination: Catholic Church
- Sui iuris church: Latin Church
- Rite: Roman Rite
- Established: 9th century
- Cathedral: Pennabilli Cathedral
- Co-cathedral: San Leone Cathedral Basilica di S. Marino
- Secular priests: 45 (diocesan); 20 (Religious Orders); 11 Permanent Deacons

Current leadership
- Pope: Leo XIV
- Bishop: Domenico Beneventi
- Bishops emeritus: Andrea Turazzi

Map
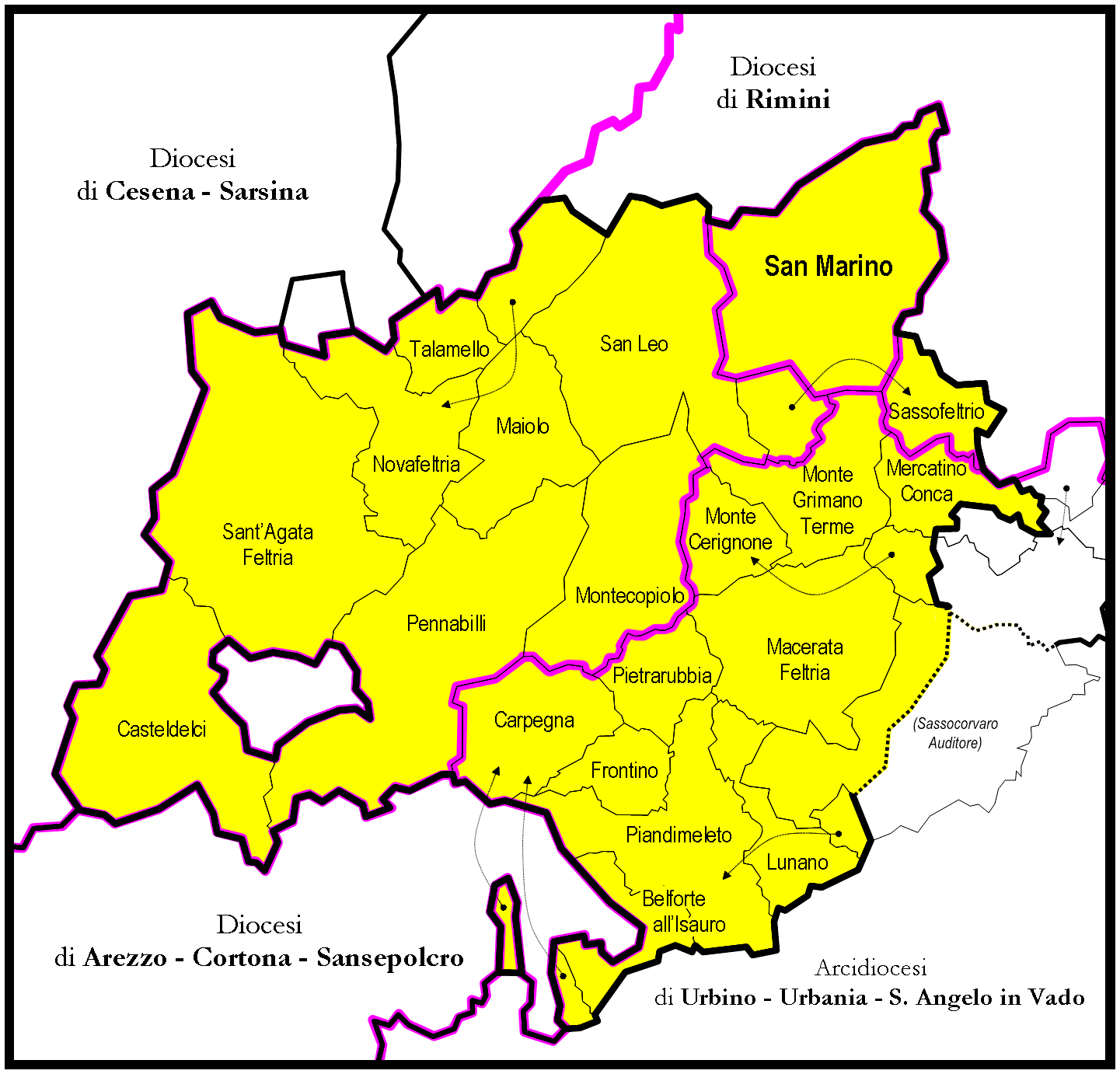
- Map of diocese

Website
- diocesi-sanmarino-montefeltro.it (in Italian)

The Diocese of San Marino-Montefeltro (Latin: Dioecesis Sammarinensis-Feretrana), known until 1977 as the Diocese of Montefeltro, is a Latin Church ecclesiastical jurisdiction or diocese of the Catholic Church in both Italy and San Marino. It is a suffragan in the ecclesiastical province of the metropolitan Archdiocese of Ravenna-Cervia. The current diocese includes all the parishes of San Marino.

It has its collegiate cathedral episcopal see S. Bartolomeo, dedicated to the Apostle St. Bartholomew, in Pennabilli, Rimini, Emilia Romagna, and two co-cathedrals:

- the church of San Leo, located 18.4 km or 11.4 mi northeast of Pennabilli, in the town of that name, once the diocese's cathedral.
- the minor basilica, the Basilica di San Marino, in the City of San Marino, a World Heritage Site.

== History ==
The earliest mention of Montefeltro, as Montem Feretri, is in the diplomas by which first Holy Roman Emperor Charlemagne confirmed the donation of Pepin. In 785 the bishopric was established as Diocese of Montefeltro.

The first known bishop of Montefeltro was Agatho (826), whose residence was at San Leo.

Bishop Joannes (1218–1221?) was granted the title of Count by the Emperor Frederick II.

From the death of Bishop Ennio Filonardi in the first half of 1565 to the arrival of Bishop Gianfrancesco Sormani, the diocese of Montefeltro was without a resident bishop. Bishop Carlo Visconti of Ventimiglia was appointed on 6 July, probably as Apostolic Administrator, but he was in Rome, having just been appointed a cardinal; in any case, he died on 12 November 1565. It was not until after March 1567 that Sormani was installed. During all this time, the Chapter and city were being harassed by the soldiers of Duke

=== Cathedral(s) ===
On 26 May 1572, in the bull "Rationi congruit," Pope Gregory XIII ruled that the bishop and Chapter of Montefeltro could move to the collegiate church of S. Bartholomew, reside there, and hold divine offices there. There was only one cathedral in a diocese, however, and both S. Leo and S. Bartholomew could not both be cathedrals. The insignia of a cathedral would remain at S. Leo.

In 1572, Pope Gregory XIII also appointed an Apostolic Visitator and Delegate, Bishop Gerolamo Raggazoni of Famagosta, to investigate the conditions of the dioceses of Urbino, S. Leo and Montefeltro, Senigaglia, Psauro, Fossombrone, Cagli, Gubbio, and other churches. Montefeltro was visited officially in September 1574; the cathedral of S. Leo was found without officiating clergy, and the bishop was non-resident; the episcopal palace was in ruins and the Chapter residences nearly so. The main altar of the cathedral had had to be protected by a kind of baldachino, so that it would not be damaged by falling pieces of the roof. The other four altars were undecorated and unfit, and if not refurbished for divine service it was ordered that they be reemoved.

In 1592, Bishop Giovanni Francesco Sormani (1567–1601) held a diocesan synod, and issued a set of synodial decrees, which were published in Rimini in 1592. Bishop Pietro Cartolari (1601–1607) also held a diocesan synod.

In 1672, the city of Montefeltro, with a population of c. 1,000, was in the territory of Urbino and under the temporal sovereignty of the Papacy. The diocese was a suffragan of the archbishopric of Urbino, and the cathedral of S. Leo was administered and staffed by a corporation called the Chapter, which contained three dignities and fourteen canons.

Under Bishop Flaminio Dondi (1724) the see was again transferred to San Leo, but later it returned to Pennabilli. On 6–8 July 1734, Bishop Giovanni Crisostomo Calvi (1729–1747) held a diocesan synod in Pennabilli. In 1747, the bishops were resident in Pennabilli, and were using the collegiate church of S. Bartolommeo for their episcopal functions. Bishop Giuseppe Maria Terzi (1777–1803) held a diocesan synod in Pennabilli, in the church of S. Leo, on 13–15 October 1779. The synodal decrees were published.

The parish of S. Apollinaris in the village of Paderno was removed from the diocese of Montefeltro by order of Pope Pius XI and the Sacred Consistorial Congregation on 20 February 1938, and assigned to the diocese of Sarsina.

A change of territory took place on 3 January 1942, when Pope Pius XII and the Sacred Consistorial Congregation removed the parish of S. Marina in Bese from the jurisdiction of the diocese of Montefeltro and placed it in the diocese of Borgo San Sepolcro.

=== Revising diocesan boundaries, conference, metropolitanate ===
Acting in conformity to the decree "Christus Dominus" of the Second Vatican Council (1962–1965), Pope Paul VI and the Sacred Congregation for Bishops issued the decree "Proprius dioecesis" on 22 February 1977.

To consolidate the diocese, the territories of three parishes were removed from the jurisdiction of the diocese of Sarsina and added to Montefeltro; likewise, two parishes were removed from San Marino-Montefeltro and assigned to Sarsina. Eleven parishes were removed and assigned to the Diocese of Rimini. The diocese was renamed the 'Diocese of San Marino–Montefeltro. The pope also decided that San Marino-Montefeltro would no longer belong to the ecclesiastical conference of Picenum, but rather be assigned to the conference of Aemiliana-Flaminia. At the same time, the diocese was removed from the metropolitanate of Urbino, and transferred to the metropolitan of Ravenna-Cervia.

Montefeltro enjoyed Papal visits from Pope John Paul II in August 1982,, Pope Benedict XVI on 19 June 2011, and Pope Leo XIV on 22 August 2026.

On 18 September 2012, Pope Benedict XVI appointed the bishop of San Marino-Montefeltro, Bishop Luigi Negri, to serve as one of the Synod Fathers for the October 2012 13th Ordinary General Assembly of the Synod of Bishops.

== Bishops ==
(incomplete; sometimes sources contradict)

=== Diocese of Montefeltro ===
Latin Name: Feretrana (seu Montis Feltri)
Erected: 9th Century
Metropolitan: Archdiocese of Urbino

==== To 1498 ====
- Agatho (826), whose residence was at San Leo.

...

- Arduino (1015–1044)
- Adolfo (1053–1074)
- Gebizone (1075–1079)

...

- Pietro Carpegna (?–1125?)
- Arnoldo (1140–1154)
- Gualfredo (?–1172?)
- Albertus (attested 1206–1208)
- Giovanni (1218–1221?)
- Rolando (1222–1229)
- Ugolino (1232–1252)
- Giovanni (1252–1275)
- Roberto da Montefeltro (1282–1284)
- Liberto (1286–1311)
- Benvenuto (1318–1347)
- Claro Peruzzi, O.P. (1349–1375)
- Pietro (1378–1385?)
- Pinus Ordelaffi (1386–1390?), Administrator, Roman Obedience
- Lucas Contraguerra, O.P. (1388– ? ), Avignon Obedience
- Benedetto di Salnucio, O.S.B. (1390–1408), Roman Obedience
- Giovanni Sedani, O.F.M. (1409–1444), Roman Obedience
- Francesco da Chiaravalle (1444–1450)
- Giacomo Tebaldi (1450–1456)
- Andrea (1456.11 – 1458)
- Corrado Marcellino (1458)
- Giacomo da Foglia (27 October 1458 – 1459?)
- Roberto degli Adimari (1459–1484)
- Celso Mellini (1484–1498)

==== 1498 to 1977 ====
- Luca Mellini (1498–1507)
- Antonio Castriani, O.F.M. (1507–1510)
- Paolo Alessandri degli Strabuzzi (1510.10 – death 1538)
- Ennio Filonardi (1538–1549) Administrator
- Ennio Massari Filonardi (1549 –1565)
- Carlo Visconti (1565)
- Giovanni Francesco Sormani (1567–1601)
- Pietro Cartolari 1601–1607)
- Consalvo Duranti (1607–1643)
- Bernardino Scala (1643–1667)
- Antonio Possenti (1667–1671)
- Giacomo Buoni (1672–1678)
- Bernardino Belluzzi (1678–1702)
- Pietro Valerio Martorelli (1703–1724)
- Flaminio Dondi (1724–1729)
- Giovanni Crisostomo Calvi (1729–1747)
- Sebastiano Bonaiuti (1747–1765)
- Giovanni Pergolini (1765–1777)
- Giuseppe Maria Terzi (1777–1803)
- Antonio Begni (1804–1840)
- Antonio Benedetto Antonucci (1840–1842)
- Salvatore Leziroli (1842–1845)
- Martino Caliendi (1845–1849)
- Crispino Agostinucci (5 November 1849 – death 1856)
- Elia Antonio Alberini (1856–1860)
- Luigi Mariotti (23 March 1860 – death 1890)
- Carlo Bonaiuti (1890–1896)
- Alfonso Andreoli (1896–1911)
- Raffaele Santi (1912–1940)
- Vittorio De Zanche (1940–1949)
- Antonio Bergamaschi (1949–1966)

○ Bishop Emilio Biancheri of Rimini (1966–1977), Apostolic Administrator

=== Diocese of San Marino-Montefeltro ===
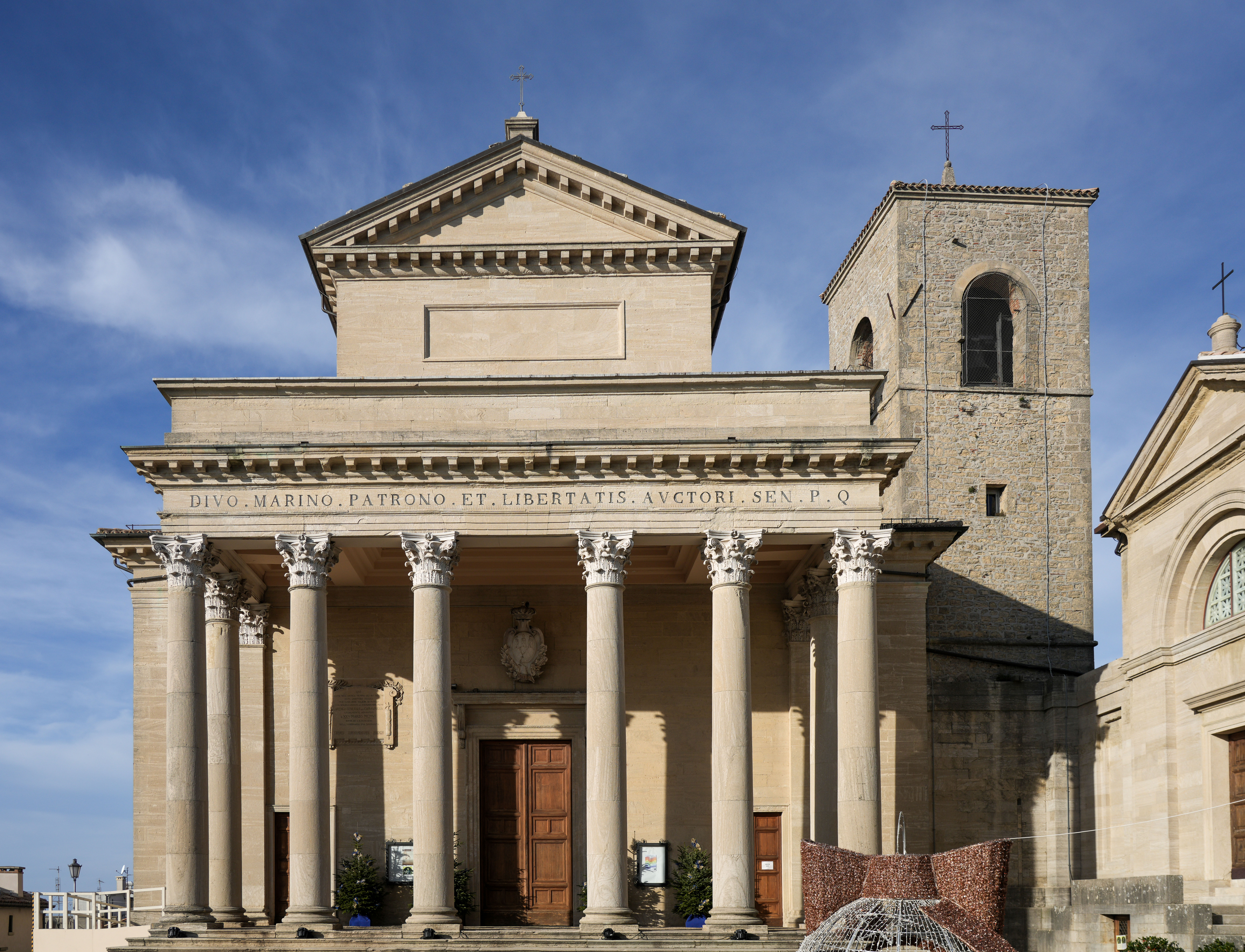
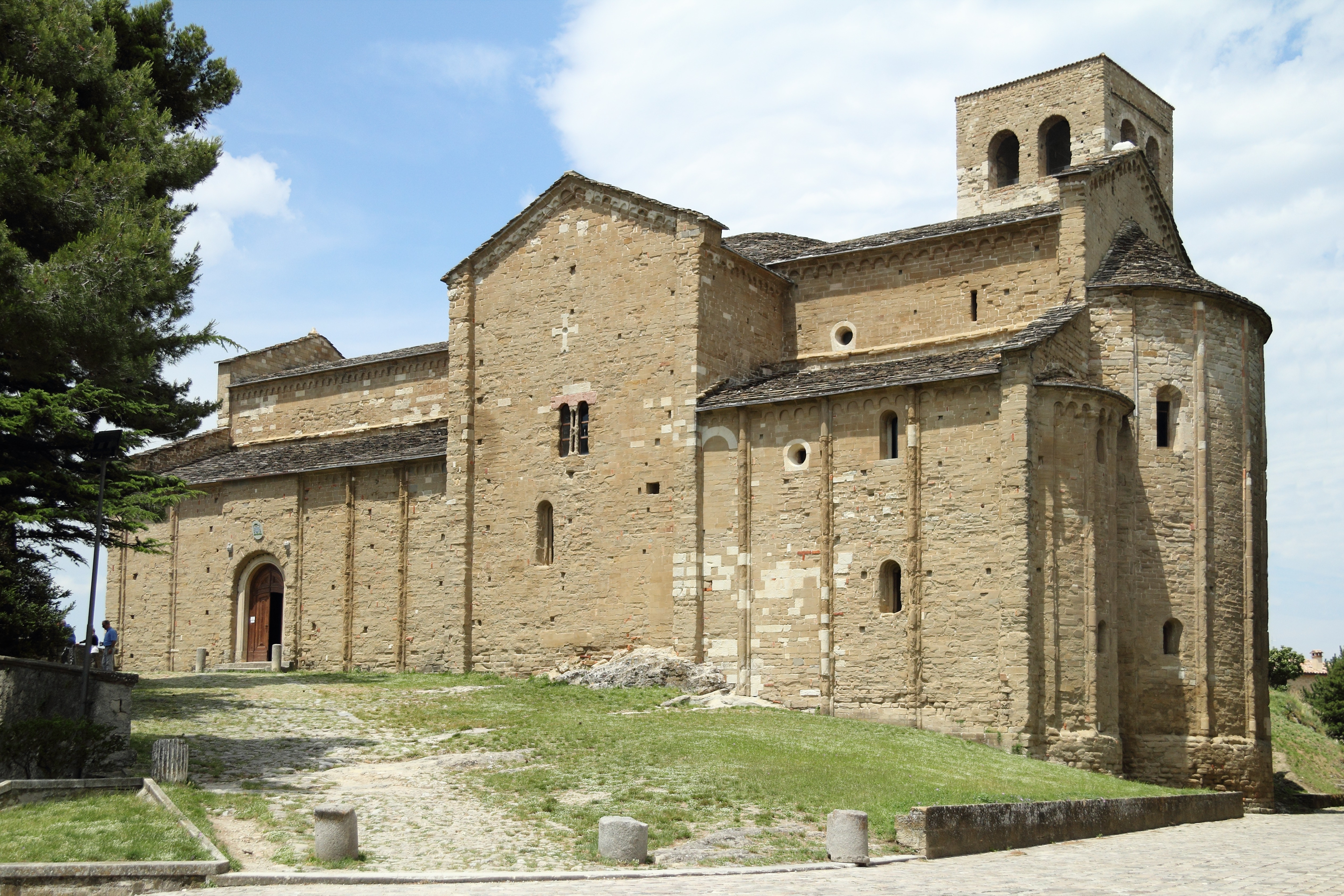
Co-cathedral Basilica in San Marino (left) Co-cathedral in San Leo (right)

Name Changed: 22 February 1977
Latin Name: Sammarinensis-Feretrana
Metropolitan: Archdiocese of Ravenna-Cervia

- Giovanni Locatelli (1977–1988)
- Mariano De Nicolò (1989–1995)
- Paolo Rabitti (1995–2004)
- Luigi Negri (2005–2012)
- Andrea Turazzi (2013-2024)
- Domenico Beneventi (2024 - )

== See also ==
- Roman Catholicism in San Marino

== Sources and external links ==
=== Reference works for bishops ===
- Gams, Pius Bonifatius (1873). Series episcoporum Ecclesiae catholicae: quotquot innotuerunt a beato Petro apostolo (in Latin). Ratisbon: Typis et Sumptibus Georgii Josephi Manz. p. 705.
- Eubel, Conradus, ed. (1913). Hierarchia catholica (in Latin). Vol. 1 (Tomus 1) (second ed.). Münster: Libreria Regensbergiana. p. 247.. Archived.
- Eubel, Conradus, ed. (1914). Hierarchia catholica (in Latin). Vol. 2 (Tomus 2) (second ed.). Münster: Libreria Regensbergiana. p. 114.. Archived.
- Eubel, Conradus, ed. (1923). Hierarchia catholica (in Latin). Vol. 3 (Tomus 3) (second ed.). Münster: Libreria Regensbergiana. p. 146.. Archived.
- Gauchat, Patritius (Patrice) (1935). Hierarchia catholica. Vol. Tomus IV (1592-1667). Münster: Libraria Regensbergiana.
- Ritzler, Remigius; Sefrin, Pirminus (1952). Hierarchia catholica medii et recentis aevi. Vol. Tomus V (1667-1730). Patavii: Messagero di S. Antonio.
- Ritzler, Remigius; Sefrin, Pirminus (1958). Hierarchia catholica medii et recentis aevi. Vol. Tomus VI (1730-1799). Patavii: Messagero di S. Antonio.
- Ritzler, Remigius; Sefrin, Pirminus (1968). Hierarchia Catholica medii et recentioris aevi (in Latin). Vol. VII (1800–1846). Monasterii: Libreria Regensburgiana.
- Remigius Ritzler; Pirminus Sefrin (1978). Hierarchia catholica Medii et recentioris aevi (in Latin). Vol. VIII (1846–1903). Il Messaggero di S. Antonio.
- Pięta, Zenon (2002). Hierarchia catholica medii et recentioris aevi (in Latin). Vol. IX (1903–1922). Padua: Messagero di San Antonio. ISBN 978-88-250-1000-8.

=== Studies ===
- Cappelletti, Giuseppe (1845). Le chiese d'Italia (in Italian). Vol. terzo. Venice: G. Antonelli. pp. 285–337.
- Kehr, Paul Fridolin (1909). Italia pontificia Vol. IV (Berlin: Weidmann 1909), pp. 227-230. (in Latin)
- Olivieri, Orazio (ed. Giuseppe Ginepri). Memorie del Montefeltro. Voltate dal latino in volgare e pubblicate per la prima volta. Pennabilli: Tipografia Feretrana 1889.
- Ughelli, Ferdinando (1717). Italia sacra sive de Episcopis Italiae, et insularum adjacentium... (in Latin), second ed., Tomus secundus (vol. 2). Venice: Sebastian Colet 1717. pp. 841-856.

==== External links ====
- GCatholic with incumbent bio links
