= Martino Ferabosco =

Italian engraver

Martino Ferabosco was an Italian architect and engraver who lived in Rome, and engraved the plates for the work Architettura della Basilica di San Pietro in Vaticano (Architecture of St. Peter's Basilica in the Vatican) published in Rome in 1620.
