= Giacomo Tebaldi =

Italian Roman Catholic bishop and cardinal

Giacomo Tebaldi (died 1465) (called the Cardinal of Montefeltro or the Cardinal of Sant'Anastasia) was an Italian Roman Catholic bishop and cardinal.

== Biography ==
Giacomo Tebaldi was born in Rome, the son of nobles Marco and Ventura Tebaldi. His brother Simone Tebaldi was the personal physician of Pope Callixtus III.

After obtaining a doctorate in civil law, he took Holy Orders as a subdeacon and was later appointed to the episcopate from this rank.

On 5 June 1450 he was elected Bishop of Montefeltro (1450–1458). He served as governor of Spoleto from September 1455 to November 1456, and then as governor of Perugia. He was appointed Archbishop of Naples in August 1456, but he was never installed, and resigned as archbishop in November 1456.

In the consistory of 17 December 1456 Pope Callixtus III made Tebaldi a cardinal priest. After entering Rome on 11 January 1457 he received the red hat at Santa Maria del Popolo on 12 January 1457. On 14 January 1457 he was awarded the titular church of Sant'Anastasia. In 1458, he served as Camerlengo of the Sacred College of Cardinals.

He participated in the papal conclave of 1458 that elected Pope Pius II. He later participated in the papal conclave of 1464 that elected Pope Paul II.

He died in Rome on 4 September 1466. He is buried in Santa Maria sopra Minerva, with a tomb by Andrea Bregno and Giovanni Dalmata.

== Books ==
- Cardella, Lorenzo (1793). Memorie storiche de' cardinali della santa Romana chiesa (in Italian). Vol. Tomo terzo. Roma: Pagliarini.
- Eubel, Conradus, ed. (1914). Hierarchia catholica, Tomus 2 (2nd ed.). Münster: Libreria Regensbergiana. (in Latin)
- Sciolla, Gianni Carlo (1970). "Profilo di Andrea Bregno". Arte Lombarda, 15, No. 1 (1970), pp. 52–58. Retrieved: 2016-10-25. (in Italian) JSTOR 43105600 (subscription required)

Catholic Church titles
Preceded by Enea Silvio Piccolomini	Camerlengo of the Sacred College of Cardinals; 1458	Succeeded by Juan de Mella
