= Leopoldo Gasparotto =

Italian Resistance leader

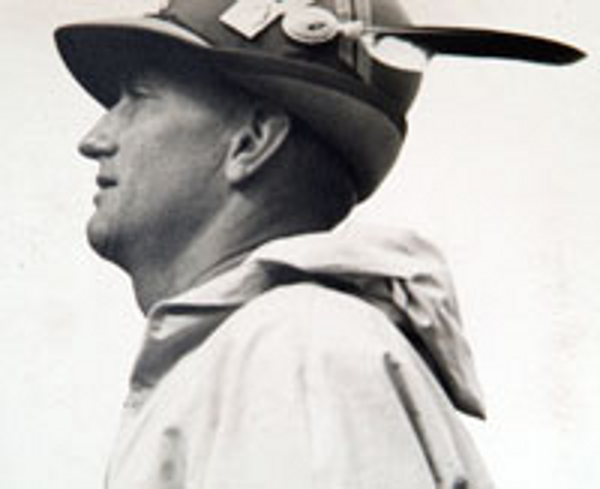
- Born: 30 December 1902; Milan, Kingdom of Italy
- Died: 22 June 1944 (aged 41); Fossoli, Italy
- Military career
- Conflicts: Italian Civil War
- Awards: Gold Medal of Military Valor (posthumous)

Leopoldo Gasparotto, better known as Poldo Gasparotto (30 December 1902 – 22 June 1944) was an Italian mountaineer and Resistance leader during World War II.

== Biography ==
The son of Luigi Gasparotto and Maria Biglia, he was born in Milan into a Friulian family of progressive ideas; before the advent of Fascism his father had been deputy and minister in the Bonomi I Cabinet with the Italian Democratic Social Party. After graduating in law at the University of Milan, he carried out his military service in the mountain artillery, with the rank of Lieutenant. A passionate mountaineer, he was also appointed an "academic" of the Italian Alpine Club (an honour reserved for members who had achieved exceptional mountaineering feats without the help of mountain guides) and became a mountaineering instructor in the military school of Aosta. However, his firm anti-fascist convictions prevented him from rising in rank, as he refused to join either the Fascist University Group or the Fascist union. During the interwar period, Gasparotto worked as a lawyer but became known for his role as a creator of new climbing routes in the Alps, and in 1929 he travelled to the Caucasus, where he made the first ascent of Mount Giulchi (4,400 meters) and the first ski ascent of Mount Elbrus. In 1933 he made the first solo ascent of the east side of Mont Blanc, and in 1934 he explored and climbed in Greenland, discovering the Milano and Roma glaciers and the Savoia peninsula, which he christened with their names.

After the fall of Fascism on 25 July 1943, Gasparotto (who had joined the underground Justice and Freedom movement in the 1930s and the Action Party in 1942), along with his father and other Milanese anti-fascists including Alfredo Pizzoni, who acted as spokesman, founded an "Inter-Party Committee" that asked General Vittorio Ruggero, commander of the territorial defense of Milan, to organize the defence of the city against the Germans and to provide weapons to the anti-fascists, offering to fight the Nazis alongside the soldiers. Gasparotto and Pizzoni also planned to establish a "National Guard" made of volunteers that would defend the city. After the proclamation of the armistice of Cassibile on 8 September, Gasparotto was among the founders of the National Liberation Committee of Milan; along with his father, Pizzoni, Riccardo Lombardi and Girolamo Li Causi, he again requested weapons from General Ruggero, who tried to buy time, and along with Mario Martinelli and others he set up a recruiting center for the National Guard, which in a few hours was able to gather some seven hundred volunteers.

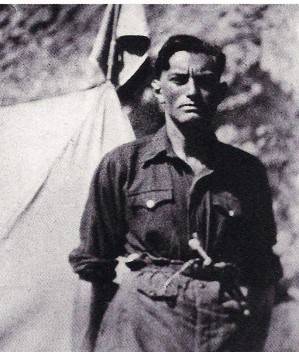
Gasparotto in late 1943

General Ruggero, however, was eventually persuaded not to take any action against the Germans, and instead forbade civilians from using weapons, under penalty of death, and banned public gatherings. On 10 September, he informed the members of the National Liberation Committee that his troops would not interfere with the German occupation of the city, which indeed occurred on the following day, almost without a shot being fired. Gasparotto and the other anti-fascists, left without weapons and without the support of the Army, were forced to go into hiding.

After taking his pregnant wife and child to Switzerland, Gasparotto returned to Lombardy, where he started to organize partisan groups in the Val Codera and Val Brembana and on the mountains north of Lake Como; before long he became the commander of the Justice and Freedom Brigades of Lombardy, with the nom de guerre "Rey". On 11 December 1943, however, he was arrested by the Nazis in Milan and imprisoned in the San Vittore prison in Milan, where he was savagely tortured but revealed nothing of what the Resistance was organizing. From Milan he was transferred to the Verona prison, and then to the Fossoli transit camp, where he was tortured again, with no more success. Even while in the camp, he managed to remain in contact with the Emilian partisans and began to organize a mass escape of prisoners. However, the plan was discovered by the Nazis, who began to crack down on its suspected organizers. On 22 June 1944, Gasparotto was shot by the Nazis, together with other prisoners, in circumstances that were never fully clarified. He was posthumously awarded the Gold Medal of Military Valor.
