= Antonio Greppi (banker) =

Italian banker, merchant, politician and diplomat

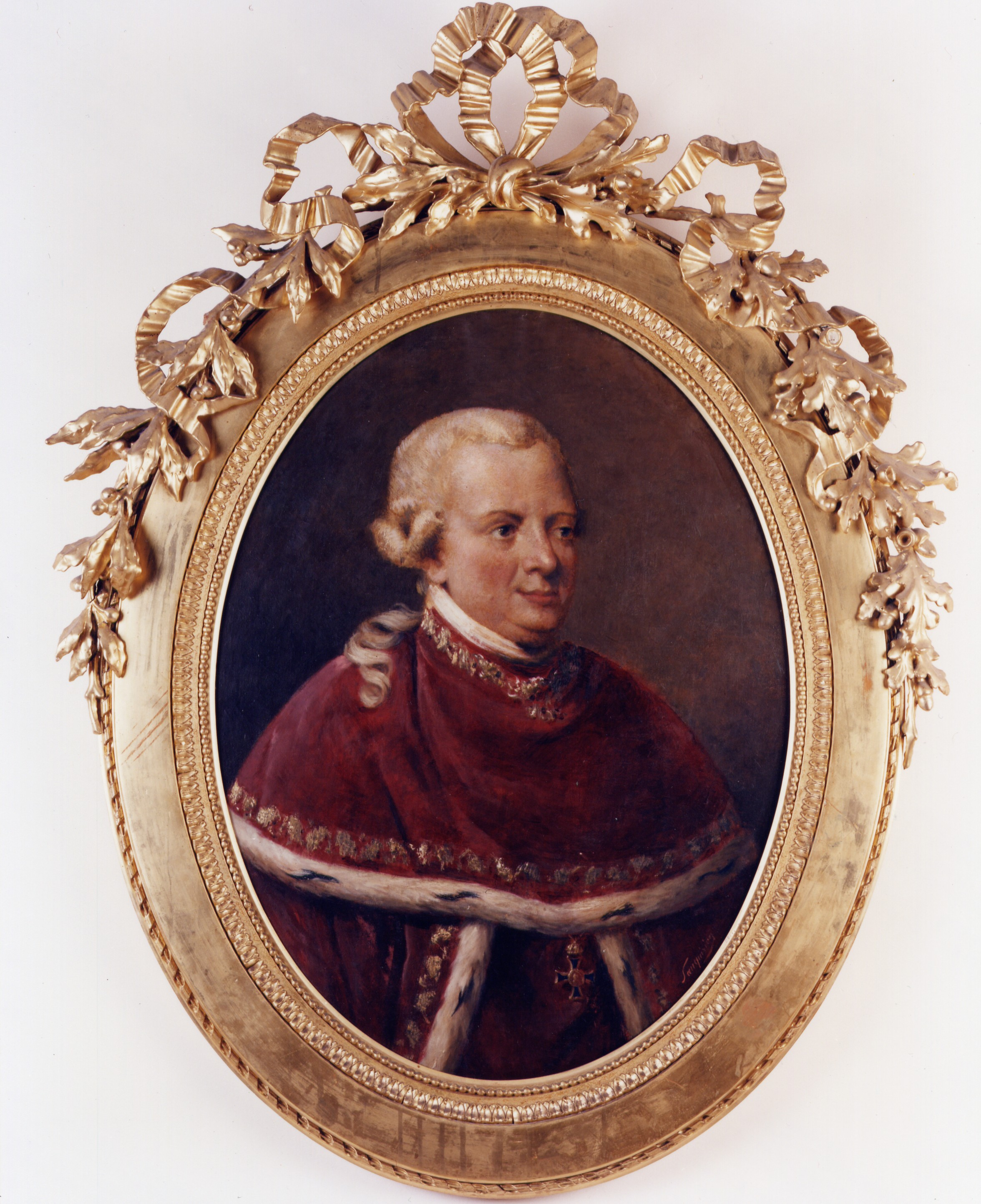
- Portrait of Greppi by Alessandro Sanquirico
- Born: 4 February 1722; Cazzano Sant'Andrea, Duchy of Milan
- Died: 22 July 1799 (aged 77); Santa Vittoria, near Gualtieri, Duchy of Modena and Reggio
- Occupations: Financier, Politician, Diplomat
- Era: 17th century
- Spouse: Laura Cotta

Antonio Greppi (4 February 1722 in Cazzano Sant'Andrea – 22 July 1799 in Santa Vittoria, near Gualtieri), 1st Count of Bussero and Corneliano was an Italian banker, merchant, politician and diplomat, active at the international level in wool and textile manufacture. He had a leading role in the reform of taxation in Habsburg Lombardy.

== Biography ==
Antonio Greppi was born on 4 February 1722 to Gabriele Greppi and Elena Piatti. His place of birth is not documented with certainty. His family had resided in a palace in Cazzano Sant'Andrea, near Bergamo, since the 15th century, so it is plausible that he was born there, although his baptismal record has not been found. In 1743, Greppi married Laura Cotta, whose family was on the Bergamo city council. Between 1744 and 1749, the couple had six sons: Giuseppe, Marco, Giacomo, Alessandro and Paolo. Although the family benefited from income derived from landholdings, they were also engaged in the wholesale trade of wool and textiles. During the first half of the eighteenth century, they operated throughout the territory of the Republic of Venice, notably in Brescia, Verona and Venice, as well as in Lombardy.

Greppi joined his father’s firm in his early twenties, soon becoming general agent and manager of relations with foreign clients. During the War of the Austrian Succession (1740–1748), he significantly increased the firm's business by supplying the Imperial Army with textiles, uniforms, grain and loans. The conclusion of the conflict enabled the Viennese government to implement an extensive programme of administrative and economic reforms in Lombardy. The primary objective was to restore public finances by streamlining the system and relieving the treasury of debts incurred during the war, while also facilitating the gradual redemption of alienated royal prerogatives.

The Minister Plenipotentiary of Lombardy, Gian Luca Pallavicini, consolidated Lombardy's main indirect taxes and monopolies into a single joint-stock tax-farming company. To establish a company capable of taking on the contract for the Duchy of Milan's general tax farm, Pallavicini approached Greppi, leveraging the extensive network of his family's firm. With the support of Pallavicini, Greppi succeeded in establishing a new company, called the Ferma Generale. The company was moulded on Jean-Baptiste Colbert’s fermes générales, which Louis XIV’s minister had introduced in France in 1680. On 5 May 1750, the company signed an initial partnership agreement with the state treasury. Alongside Greppi, who held a prominent position from the outset in his capacity as royal representative tasked with overseeing the company’s operations, the signatories included the wealthy merchants Rocco Rottigni, Giuseppe Pezzoli, and Francesco Antonio Bettinelli (a wealthy merchant from Cremona) and the Milanese patrician Giacomo Mellerio. In 1757, the contract was renewed for an additional six years, beyond its original expiry date, in exchange for a substantial advance payment requested by Vienna due to its urgent need for funds caused by the Seven Years' War (1756–1763).

Ludwig Guttenbrunn, Portrait of the Greppi Family, 1780, Turin, priv. col.

By 1770, the time seemed ripe for the administration of duties to be transferred entirely to state control, so the contract with the Ferma Generale was terminated ahead of schedule. However, Greppi remained an invaluable asset to the Habsburg monarchy. He supported the court in its struggle against the patrician oligarchy and the entrenched financial groups that hindered reform, and he was given important diplomatic assignments by Empress Maria Theresa. In 1757 he advised the court on a commercial treaty with the Holy See. In 1780, acting as a royal delegate, he signed an agreement between Austrian Lombardy, the Duchy of Modena, and the Grand Duchy of Tuscany for the construction of the new Abetone road, a vital artery connecting the various territories within the Habsburg sphere of influence.

From the mid-1760s onwards, Greppi – who had amassed a considerable fortune as Milan's tax farmer – invested his wealth in commercial banking and credit networks across Northern Italy and Europe. In partnership with Mellerio and Pezzoli, he acquired substantial landed estates, including agricultural estates in Sermide and Ostiglia, near Mantua, in Santa Vittoria near Reggio Emilia and in Rubiera near Modena. He also established branches in Amsterdam, Hamburg, and Cadiz, initially employing his sons – Marco, Giacomo, and Paolo – as apprentices, and later making them partners and managers. Furthermore, he invested his capital in extensive public and private lending activities. Fernand Braudel has likened Greppi's firm to a modern investment bank.

Greppi secured the esteem and trust of figures such as Maria Theresa, Francesco III d'Este, and the Queen of Naples, Maria Carolina of Austria, as well as ministers like Karl Joseph von Firmian – who served as plenipotentiary in Milan from 1758 to 1782 – and Wenzel Anton Kaunitz, who became State Chancellor in 1753. A patron of intellectuals and artists, Greppi counted such literary figures as Metastasio, Baretti, and Parini among his friends. Vanvitelli and Piermarini designed his villa in Cernusco sul Naviglio, which he purchased in 1769. Piermarini also designed his grand residence on Via Sant'Antonio in Milan, working alongside Parini, Appiani, and Knoller, who oversaw the iconographic programme.

On 28 December 1770, Greppi was appointed as a councillor to the newly established Chamber of Accounts (Camera dei Conti). The institution was responsible for overseeing the finances of the public and royal administrations, auditing state expenditure, and providing advice on trade, roads, coinage, and the food supply (annona). Greppi was also responsible for preparing the general budget for the duchies of Milan and Mantua for several years.

In 1787, Greppi retired to Santa Vittoria, determined to step away from public life in order to devote himself exclusively to his family's affairs. He spent the final years of his life there, only leaving for brief visits to Venice and Milan. There, he resolutely defended his family's interests, which had been severely impacted by requisitions and levies during the French occupation and the Cisalpine Republic. He died in Santa Vittoria on 22 July 1799.

== Bibliography ==
- Puccinelli, Elena (2002). "GREPPI, Antonio". Dizionario Biografico degli Italiani (in Italian). Vol. 59: Graziano–Grossi Gondi. Rome: Institute of the Italian Encyclopaedia. ISBN 978-88-12-00032-6.
- Beduschi, Guido G. (13 April 2023). "Antonio Greppi — architect of enlightened absolutism". engelsbergideas.com.
