= Lorenzo Franchi =

Italian painter

Lorenzo Franchi (Bologna, c. 1563 - c. 1630) was an Italian painter, active in a late-Mannerist or early-Baroque style mainly in Reggio Emilia.

== Biography ==
He trained under Camillo Procaccini, and travelled with him to Reggio Emilia. Over time, his style came to resemble the work of Annibale and Ludovico Carracci. He painted for the church of San Prospero in Reggio and in the residence of the Signore Giovanni Casotti. He also painted a Seated Virgin and Child, and St. John the Baptist for the Church of San Tommaso; a St Ursula for the church of San Zenone; and frescoed the Chapel of the Most Holy Rosary in San Domenico.

Outside Reggio, his work can be found at San Pellegrino outside of Porta Castello. He also painted many procession banners, a field in which he competed with Sisto Badalocchio. When his brother died in Bologna, his nieces and nephews were left without support, and Franchi relocated to Bologna. There he found heavy competition, and so returned to Reggio, where he painted a Virgin of the Annunciation with a choir of angels for the church of Santi Giacomo e Filippo.
