= Gualtieri =

- Comune
- Comune di Gualtieri
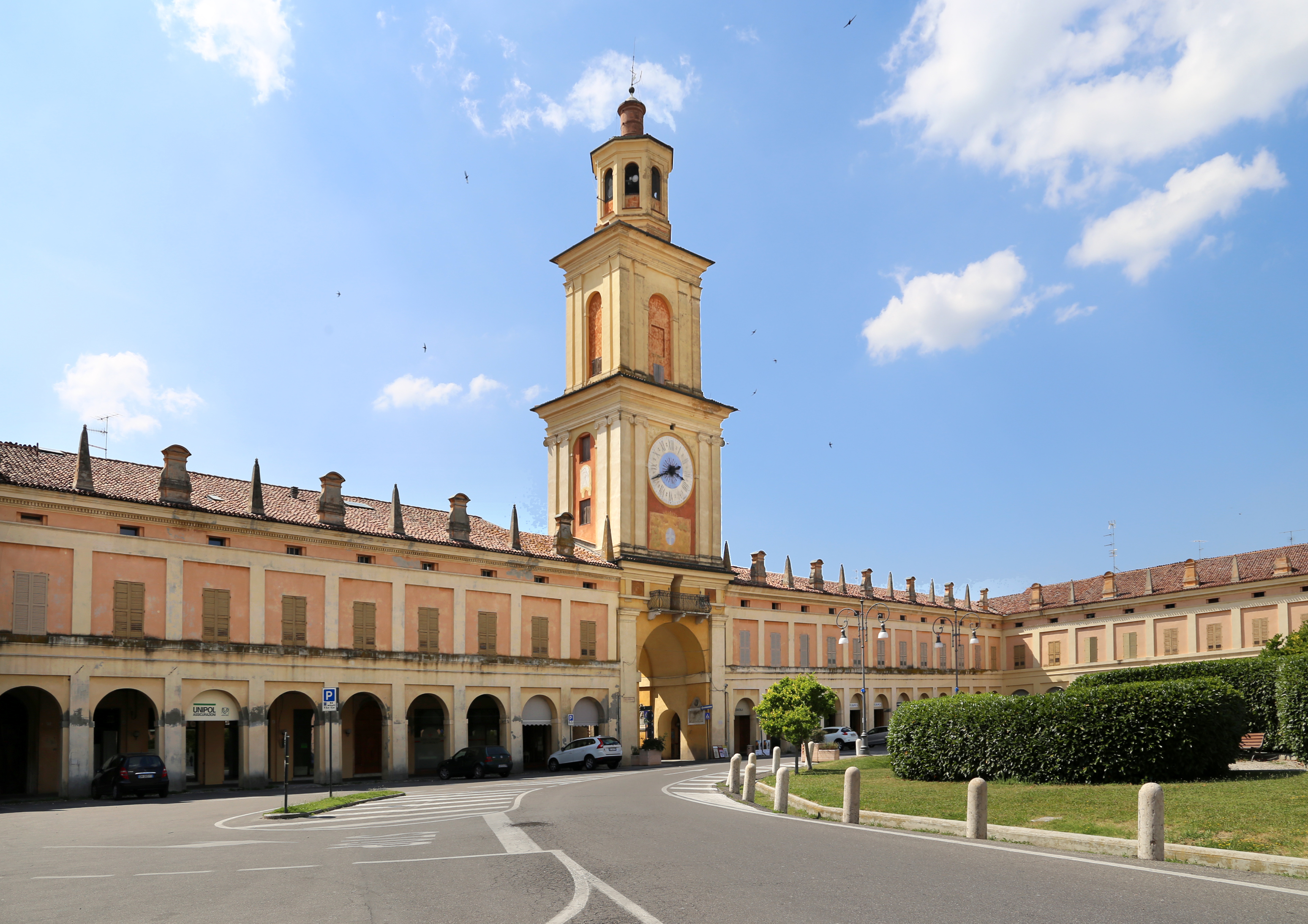
- Watch Tower in Gualtieri

- Location within Italy Location within Emilia-Romagna
- Coordinates: 44°54′N 10°38′E
- Country: Italy
- Region: Emilia-Romagna
- Province: Reggio Emilia (RE)
- Frazioni: Bigliana, Bigliardi, Canossa, Livello, Marinona, Pieve Saliceto, Reseghetta Inferiore, Santa Vittoria, Soliani, Vecchia

Government
  - Mayor: Renzo Bergamini

Area
  - Total: 36.1 km^{2} (13.9 sq mi)
- Elevation: 22 m (72 ft)

Population (31 August 2017)
  - Total: 6,443
  - Density: 178/km^{2} (462/sq mi)
- Demonym: Gualtierini
- Time zone: UTC+1 (CET)
  - Summer (DST): UTC+2 (CEST)
- Postal code: 42044
- Dialing code: 0522
- Patron saint: Santa Maria della Neve
- Saint day: August 5
- Website: Official website

Gualtieri (Mantovano: Gualtēr) is a comune (municipality) in the province of Reggio Emilia, in the Italian region of Emilia-Romagna, located about 70 kilometres (43 mi) northwest of Bologna and about 25 kilometres (16 mi) north of Reggio Emilia on the right bank of the Po river. Historically, it suffered numerous floods, the last occurring in 1951. It is one of I Borghi più belli d'Italia ("The most beautiful villages of Italy").

== Origins of the name ==
According to historians, the name 'Castrum Valterii' is linked to Longobard 'Gualtiero' (equivalent to English 'Walter'), who was sent by King Agilulf in 602 to conquer Mantua.

== History ==
In the 2nd century BC, with Roman colonisation, the territory was split up. The signs of centuriation still are evident not far from Brescello (Brixellum), a village around which the settlement of Gualtieri revolved until the Lombard Age.

- 885, date of the first certain document relating to Castrum Valterii (Castel Gualtieri).
- 1435, Gualtieri becomes a part of the Parmesan domains owned by the Sforza, the dukes of Milan. They then cede it to the dukedom of Ferrara in 1479.
- 1567, Cornelio Bentivoglio, the heir of one of the most important patrician families of Bologna, receives the territory of Gualtieri in fief from the duke Alfonso II d’Este as a reward for his commitment to the decontamination of the lowlands of Reggio.
- 1575, the fief of Gualtieri becomes a marquisate. In the renovation of the territories, Cornelio Bentoviglio was helped by the collaboration of Giovan Battista Aleotti, an architect expert in military constructions and the hydraulic sciences. The renovation was completed by his son Ippolito in 1604. The Bentivoglio Reclamation(1566-1618) is considered the most important hydraulic reclamation of the lower Po Plain until the 19th century.
- 1634, Enzo Bentivoglio, heir to the marquisate, returns the fief of Gualtieri to the Ducal Chamber of Modena.
- 1769, the entrepreneur Antonio Greppi from Milan starts a flourishing agricultural company in Santa Vittoria di Gualtieri based on the physiocratic principles of the Enlightenment, i.e. with the introduction of new methods in the cultivation of rice and tobacco occupying hundreds of day labourers.
- 1872, the most powerful flood of the 19th century was preceded by that of 1765 and then followed by the last disastrous flood of the Po in 1951.
- 1965, Antonio Ligabue dies near Gualtieri. He is considered the most important naïve painter in Italy.

== The Genius Loci ==
Gualtieri is surrounded by water and earth landscapes. One of the minor Po Valley capitals, it boasted a small court yet well equipped by the Bentivoglio marquises, masters of water and reclamation techniques. The palace stands in a square, beyond which the Po lies, giving rise to a sophisticated play of perspective and theatrical ambition. The designers, experts of theatrical arts in Ferrara, wanted to involve the audience in a symbolic and extraordinarily powerful production. Today we may still appreciate the De Chirico-esque atmospheres, found in the long shadow of the arcades, under whose arches we may hide from the summer heat. From the winter fog in the woods right behind the floodplains of the Po the ghost of Ligabue emerges, where he lived wildly with the leopards of his imagination.

== Sights ==
Starting from Piazza Cavallotti and along Via Vittorio Emanuele II, we are inserted in a long perspective channel, closed at the bottom of the civic tower. As you approach the main square, the arch of the entrance of the tower lets you glimpse the façade of Gualtieri's main attraction: its Renaissance square Piazza Bentivoglio, designed by Giovan Battista Aleotti (also responsible of the Palazzo Bentivoglio, which was the residence of the Marquisses of Gualtieri). The latter has 17th-century decorations and houses a museum dedicated to the painter Antonio Ligabue. Also facing the square is the Collegiata di S. Maria della Neve, again designed by Aleotti but remade after its destruction from a flood, which houses a Crucifixion by Camillo Ricci.

Other sights include the 13th-century church of Sant'Andrea and the 16th-century church Chiesa della Concezione. About 6 kilometres (4 mi) outside Gualtieri, on the road to Reggio Emilia, is the 18th-century Palazzo Greppi.

Moving forward, after crossing the threshold of the civic tower, the magnificent and bright square space of Piazza Bentivoglio (1594–1600) opens up in all its symbolic power before visitors. According to the art historian Cesare Brandi, this is one of the most beautiful squares in Italy. And as such it already appeared in its day when its function was simultaneously that of public square and courtyard of honour for the palace (today occupied by a large garden). The protagonist of this spectacular urban management was Prince Cornelio – then Ippolito – with the help of the engineer, architect and set designer Giovanni Battista Aleotti, known as "L'Argenta", active in Ferrara and Parma, where ten years later he would produce the Teatro Farnese (a Renaissance theatre in Palazzo della Pilotta). The urban landscape of Gualtieri, like other new cities of the Renaissance, was designed to include the old village within the new layout. In the square, three streets merge, opening up the perspective on the three main sites of interest: the palace, the church and the tower.

Aleotti built the square together with Palazzo Bentivoglio, commissioned by Ippolito, son of Marquis Cornelio. Behind the palace there was a large garden that reached up to the River Po, which was the landing place for guests who came to Gualtieri by water. A century later, the palace was already in decline. In 1750 the city bought it from the d'Este family and demolished much of it. Only the side facing the square remains untouched. On the left wing in 1775 the theatre was built. Remarkable are the painting cycles that have been preserved in the palace: a fresco series on the ground floor and in several rooms on the noble floor. Decorations, stuccoes and paintings recount the mythology of the Po Valley that grew up in the shadow of the history of Rome, of the Aeneid and of Chivalric poems. Like the Gonzaga at Palazzo Te, even the Bentivoglio, on a smaller scale, wanted their Sala dei Giganti frescoed with the cycle of Jerusalem Delivered by Pier Francesco Battistelli.

In 1600, the church of Santa Maria della Neve was also completed: of the Bentivoglio building only the façade remains, designed by Aleotti, well integrated in the arcades of the square. Above the tympanum there are five pyramids, added in the 19th century as structural reinforcement. In the light of the restoration of 1773, the interior became a single nave. On the altar of the chapel above the crypt of the Bentivoglio family there is the altarpiece of the Annunciation (1611) by the painter Carlo Bononi.

The civic tower (1599–1602), tapers upwards according to architectural practice and ends with an octagonal lantern. The civic tower was reinforced and raised by Giovanni Battista Fattori in the 18th century. After leaving the square, two sacred buildings remain to be seen. The oratory church of the Immaculate Conception overlooks a small square adjacent to via Vittorio Emanuele II and is the result of the late 18th-century restoration of a previous sixteenth-century oratory and seat of the brotherhood of the same name. The wooden ceiling of the classroom painted in trompe-l'œil with the Assumption of the Virgin is from the middle of the 18th century.

The church of Sant'Andrea, of ancient foundation (documented for the first time in 1233), presides over the wide open square on which the civic well was built in 1775 in the form of a temple and with an octagonal central body, designed by Giovanni Battista Fattori. This area, with its low houses, belongs to the original core of the village, prior to the Bentivoglio buildings. The church, rebuilt in 1713, has an interior in shades of pink, blue and yellow. In the monastery that was attached to it, Ludovico Grossi da Viadana, one of the most important musicians of the 17th century, died at the end of his career in 1627.

In the hamlet of Pieve Saliceto, is the 17th-century church, the Sanctuary of the Annunciation of the Blessed Virgin. Founded near the River Po, it is preserved in its original architectural structure and in the lavish stucco decorations by Martino Ferraboschi, to whom the façade design (1667–69) is attributed. The polychrome moulded stucco decoration of the altarpiece has angels and caryatids. In the other hamlet, Santa Vittoria, a place of agricultural experimentation, whose existence intertwines first with the reclamation work of the Bentivoglio family and, in the second half of the 18th century, with the entrepreneurial action of Count Antonio Greppi, who left here its agricultural estate and a vast palace in front of the parish church (17th century, with 18th-century façade). Palazzo Greppi (1770–79) is a particular example of a noble residence integrated into farm buildings. Its severe front, 145 metres long, makes it look midway between barracks and a large farm. The paintings of the central hall are by Giovanni Morini. Finally, in this landscape of land and water, the Bentivoglio cistern built in 1576 under the Crostolo torrent from embankment to embankment is to be seen, as part of the reclamation with which the ancient marquises transformed the territory to ensure the drainage of rainwater and irrigation. The building is still in service.

== Leisure activities ==
Fishing and canoeing in the Po river, walks in the protected woods (Caldarèn) and bike rides on the cycle paths across the floodplain area. The path for cycling and walking named Po – fiume d'Europa (Po – river of Europe) connects the six municipalities along the Po coastal area.

The main feaures of the Gualtieri is the water and farmlands, smal farms, poplar woods, trenches, bridges, canals, and riverbanks. There are flood pains around this area with water flogged land. For its poplar woods and white willows, old sand quarries, oxbow lakes and big water holes, the floodplain is a captivating place. In its higher area we can find fields where grapevines are grown. Behind the main riverbank, which rises nearly behind Piazza Bentivoglio, between two roads opened in the 16th century, a protected area has been created, the Caldarèn, in which flora and fauna of the plane (carp, tench, chubs and water birds) may find shady hideouts.

== Museums and galleries ==
Palazzo Bentivoglio offers guided tours of its rooms and painting cycles. Inside Palazzo Bentivoglio we can find the Antonio Ligabue Museum Foundation, as wells as Umberto Tirelli Donations. In the former, the Naive painter's life is reconstructed with bibliographical and iconographic materials. His art, which lies between primitivism and expressionism, is not structured on a cultural basis, but on the farmer's genius and on a strong psychoanalytical element. Ligabue lived alone like a wild man in Gualtieri, in the woods and Po floodplains. On the other side, Umberto Tirelli (1928–90) was a great theatre costume designer, a reference point for major directors in cinema and theatre: he not only donated the collection of historical costumes to his small town, but also his small private picture gallery, made up of, of more or less fifty drawings and oil paintings, purchased by him or given by friends.

== Food and drink ==
Cappelletti in brodo (typical North-Italian pasta filled with meat) or tortelli di zucca (typical North-Italian pasta filled with pumpkin).

The Fogarina grape variety, from an ancient strain reappraised in 2007. This grape is the protagonist a well-known song from the popular tradition, and rosé wine, passito (raisin wine) and grappa can be obtained from it. The local watermelon from Santa Vittoria and culatello from Valle del Po are also worthy of note.
