= Palazzo Del Carbone =

Palazzo del Carbone is a historical building dating back to 1500-1600s located in the centre of Reggio Emilia, in the region of Emilia-Romagna in Northeastern Italy.

It belongs to a group of historical buildings, along with Palazzo Busetti and Musei Civici, that have been restored and restructured in a city project financed by Reggio Emilia town hall. The restoration efforts plan to preserve the outward historical appearance of the building while giving it an entirely new use, converting the structure into student housing, creating 20 fully functional apartments and commercial space for lease.
