= San Giovannino, Reggio Emilia =

Church building in Reggio nell'Emilia, Italy

Coordinates: 44.69838°N 10.62880°E

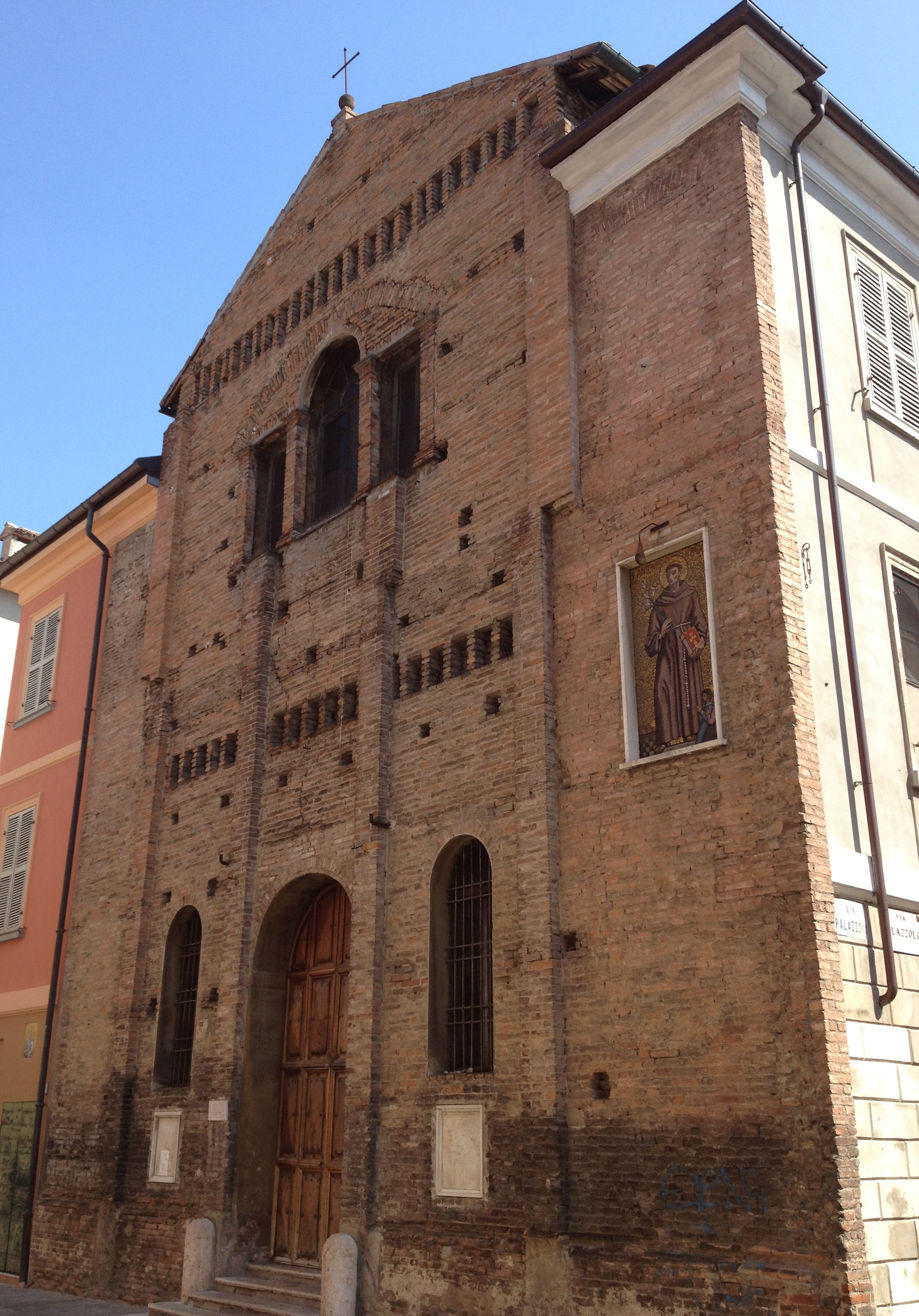

San Giovannino, or the Roman Catholic church of San Giovanni Evangelista is a religious building is located on the narrow Piazzetta San Giovanni in the historic center of Reggio Emilia, region of Emilia Romagna, Italy. The church is best known for the frescoes by early Baroque painters.

== History ==
The church at the site was first documented in c. 1200. The present layout was designed in the 16th century by Girolamo Casotti; the brick facade remains unfinished.

Beneath the dome are a series of frescoes (1613) by Sisto Badalocchio, including a dome fresco depicting the Glory of Christ. The nave vault was frescoed with panels (1614) depicting The Vision of the Apocalypse by Saint John the Evangelist depicting the Angels of the Seven Trumpets and the Defeat of Satan by Lorenzo Franchi. The surrounding quadratura was painted by Tommaso Sandrini. In the presbytery are two canvases depicting the Death and Glory of St John (1624) by Alessandro Tiarini. At the apse, the Resurrection of Christ (1613) was painted by Paolo Guidotti. The second chapel on the left displays a 15th-century polychrome terracotta statuary group, attributed mainly to Guido Mazzoni.
