= Tirelli =

Tirelli is a surname. Notable people with the surname include:

- Alicia Tirelli (born 1985), American-born Puerto Rican retired footballer
- Davide Tirelli (born 1966), Italian middle-distance runner
- Mario Tirelli (born 1906, date of death unknown), Italian entomologist
- Mattia Tirelli (born 2002), Italian professional footballer
- Umberto Tirelli (1928–1992), Italian tailor

== See also ==
- Palazzo Cassoli – Tirelli, building in Reggio Emilia
- Palazzo Tirelli, building in Reggio Emilia
- Tirelli Costumi, Rome-based costume house
