= Palazzo Pratonieri =

Coordinates: 44.69685°N 10.63182°E

The Palazzo Pratonieri is an eclectic monumental building, renovated in the 19th century using Gothic and Renaissance-style elements in the main facade, and interior decor influenced by Liberty style located on Via Toschi #9 in the historic center of the town of Reggio Emilia, region of Emilia Romagna, in Italy. It is owned by the banking enterprise Unicredit.

A residential palace at the site was commissioned in the 16th century by the Pratonieri family. The architect is presumed to have been Bartolomeo Spani and the main facade is thought to have been on Via Fornaciari. Count Alessandro Vezzani Pratonieri, in 1882 sold the structure to the Cassa di Risparmio bank of Reggio Emilia to house its headquarters. In the early 1900s the interior of the building was completely renovated by an artistic commission led by the painter Gaetano Chierici. The work was completed in 1916. In 2006, damage from earthquakes led the structure to be abandoned until a new refurbishment in 2016.

The building has eclectic elements, including protruding busts above the mullions in the first floor windows, and tiles, manufactured by Antonio Beltrami with bee symbols, associated with the bank.
