= Reggio Emilia =

City in Emilia-Romagna, Italy

Reggio Emilia Rèz (Emilian)
- Comune
- Comune di Reggio nell'Emilia
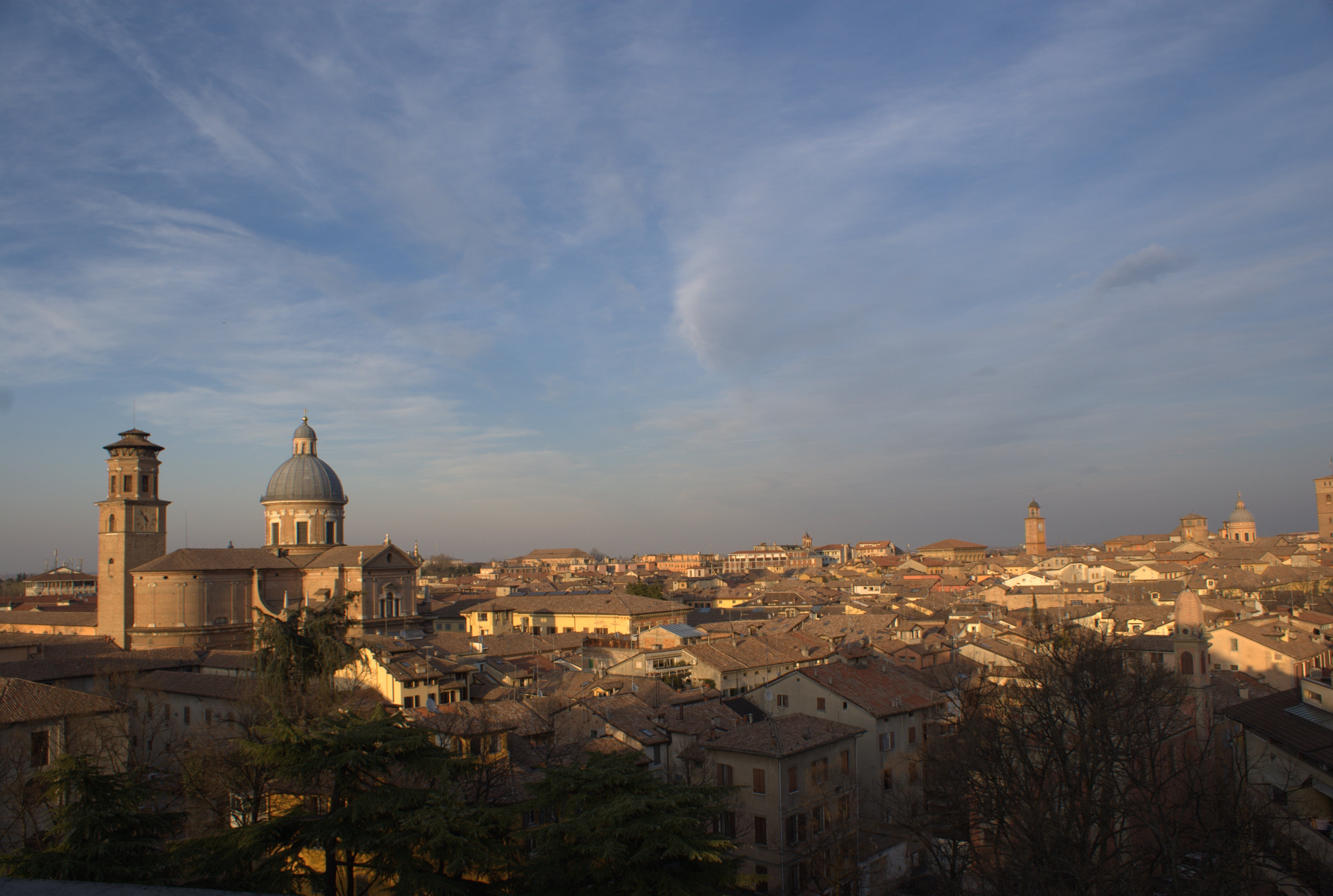
- View of Reggio Emilia

- Flag Coat of arms

- Location within Italy Location within Emilia-Romagna
- Coordinates: 44°42′N 10°38′E
- Country: Italy
- Region: Emilia-Romagna
- Province: Reggio Emilia (RE)
- Frazioni: see list

Government
  - Mayor: Marco Massari (PD)

Area
  - Total: 230.66 km^{2} (89.06 sq mi)
- Elevation: 58 m (190 ft)

Population (2026)
  - Total: 172,921
  - Density: 749.68/km^{2} (1,941.7/sq mi)
- Demonym: Reggiano
- Time zone: UTC+1 (CET)
  - Summer (DST): UTC+2 (CEST)
- Postal code: 42121-42122-42123-42124
- Dialing code: 0522
- Patron saint: San Prospero
- Saint day: November 24
- Website: Official website

Reggio nell'Emilia (Note: Pronunciation: US: /ˈrɛdʒ(i)oʊ ˌnɛlɛˈmiːljə/; Italian: [ˈreddʒo nelleˈmiːlja; ˈrɛddʒo -].) (Emilian: Rèz; Latin: Regium Lepidi), usually referred to as Reggio Emilia, or simply Reggio by its inhabitants, and known until 1861 as Reggio di Lombardia, (Note: Literally "Reggio of Lombardy".) is a city in the region of Emilia-Romagna in northeast Italy. With a population of 172,921, it is the 4th-largest city in Emilia-Romagna and the 21st-largest in Italy.

The inhabitants of Reggio nell'Emilia are called Reggiani, while the inhabitants of Reggio di Calabria, in the southwest of the country, are called Reggini.

The old town has a hexagonal form, which derives from the ancient walls, and the main buildings are from the 16th–17th centuries. The commune's territory lies entirely on a plain, crossed by the Crostolo stream.

== History ==
=== Ancient and early Middle Ages ===
Reggio began as a historical site with the construction by Marcus Aemilius Lepidus of the Via Aemilia, leading from Piacenza to Rimini (187 BC). Reggio became a judicial administration centre, with a forum called at first Regium Lepidi, then simply Regium, whence the city's current name.

During the Roman age Regium is cited only by Festus and Cicero, as one of the military stations on the Via Aemilia. However, it was a flourishing city, a Municipium with its own statutes, magistrates and art colleges.

Apollinaris of Ravenna brought Christianity in the 1st century CE. The sources confirm the presence of a bishopric in Reggio after the Edict of Milan (313). In 440 the Reggio diocese was placed under the jurisdiction of Ravenna by Western Roman Emperor Valentinian III. At the end of the 4th century, however, Reggio had decayed so much that Saint Ambrose included it among the dilapidated cities. Further damage occurred with the Barbarian invasions. After the deposition of Romulus Augustulus in 476 Reggio was part of Odoacer's realm. In 489 it came under Ostrogothic control; from 539 it was part of the Roman Empire (Italy), but was taken by Alboin's Lombards in 569. Reggio was chosen as Duchy of Reggio seat.

In 773, the Franks took Reggio. Charlemagne gave the bishop the authority to exercise royal authority over the city and established the diocese' limits (781). In 888, Reggio was handed over to the Kings of Italy. In 899, the Magyars heavily damaged it, killing Bishop Azzo II. As a result of this, new walls were built. On 31 October 900 Emperor Louis III gave authority for the erection of a castrum (castle) in the city's centre.

In 1002, Reggio's territory, together with that of Parma, Brescia, Modena, Mantua and Ferrara, were merged into the March of Tuscany, later held by Matilde of Canossa.

=== Free commune ===
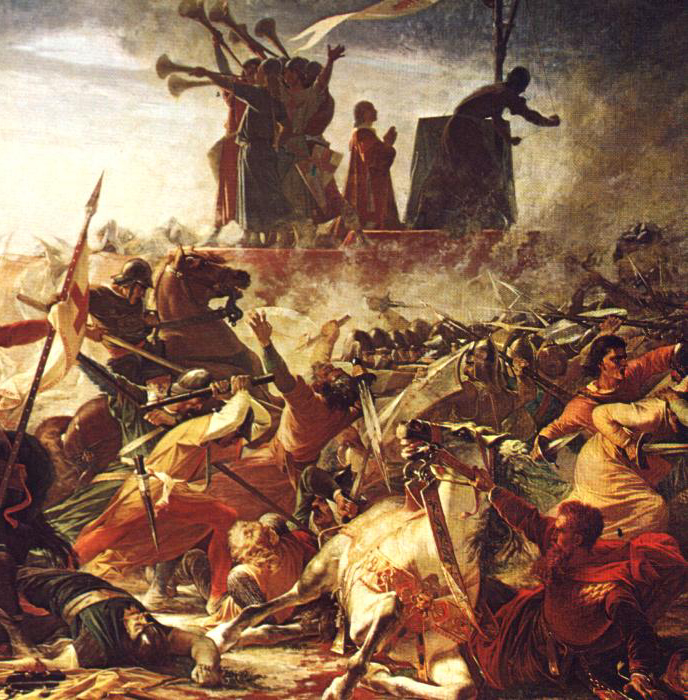
The defence of the Carroccio during the battle of Legnano (1176) by Amos Cassioli (1832–1891)

Reggio became a free commune around the end of the 11th or the beginning of the 12th century. In 1167 it was a member of the Lombard League and took part in the Battle of Legnano. In 1183 the city signed the Treaty of Konstanz, from which the city's consul, Rolando della Carità, received the imperial investiture. The subsequent peace spurred a period of prosperity: Reggio adopted new statutes, had a mint, schools with celebrated masters, and developed its trades and arts. It also increasingly subjugated the castles of the neighbouring areas. At this time the Crostolo stream was deviated westwards, to gain space for the city. The former course of the stream was turned into an avenue called Corso della Ghiara ('gravel course'), nowadays Corso Garibaldi.

The 12th and 13th centuries, however, were also a period of violent internal struggle between the Scopazzati (meaning 'swept away from the city with brooms', noblemen) and Mazzaperlini (meaning 'lice killers', plebeians) parties, and later those of Ruggeri and Malaguzzi, involved in a bitter domestic rivalry. In 1152 Reggio also warred with Parma and in 1225 with Modena, as part of the general struggle between the Guelphs and Ghibellines. In 1260, a hermit from Perugia led 25,000 penitents into the city, and this event calmed the situation for a while, spurring religious fervour. But disputes soon resurfaced, and as early as 1265 the Ghibellines killed the Guelph's leader, Caco da Reggio, and gained preeminence. Arguments with the bishop continued and two new parties formed, the Inferiori and Superiori. Final victory went to the latter.

To thwart the abuses of powerful families such as the Sessi, Fogliani and Canossa, the Senate of Reggio gave the city's rule for a period of three years to Obizzo II d'Este. This choice marked the future path of Reggio under the seignory of the latter's family, as Obizzo continued to rule de facto after his mandate has ceased. His son Azzo was expelled by the Reggiani in 1306, creating a republic ruled by 800 common people. In 1310 Holy Roman Emperor Henry VII imposed Marquis Spinetto Malaspina on the city as vicar, but he was soon driven out. The republic ended in 1326 when Cardinal Bertrando del Poggetto annexed Reggio to the Papal States.

The city was subsequently under the suzerainty of John of Bohemia, Nicolò Fogliani and Mastino II della Scala, who in 1336 gave it to Luigi Gonzaga. Gonzaga built a citadel in the St. Nazario quarter, and destroyed 144 houses. In 1356 the Milanese Visconti, helped by 2,000 exiled Reggiani, captured the city, starting an unsettled period of power sharing with the Gonzaga family. In the end the latter sold Reggio to the Visconti for 5,000 ducats. In 1405 Ottobono Terzi of Parma seized Reggio, but was killed by Michele Attendolo, who handed the city over to Nicolò III d'Este, who therefore became seignor of Reggio. The city, however, maintained significant autonomy, with laws and coinage of its own. Nicolò was succeeded by his illegitimate son Lionello, and, from 1450, by Borso d'Este.

=== Duchy of Reggio ===
In 1452, Borso was awarded the title of Duke of Modena and Reggio by Frederick III. Borso's successor, Ercole I, imposed heavy levies on the city and appointed the poet Matteo Maria Boiardo, born in the nearby town of Scandiano, as its governor. Later another famous Italian writer, Francesco Guicciardini, held the same position. In 1474, Ludovico Ariosto, author of Orlando Furioso, was born in the Malaguzzi palace, near the site of the 21st-century town hall. He was the first son of a knight from Ferrara, who was in charge of the citadel, and a noblewoman from Reggio, Daria Maleguzzi Valeri. As a grown man he would be sent to Reggio as governor on behalf of the dukes of Ferrara, and would spend time in a villa outside the town (Il Mauriziano) that still stands.

In 1513, Reggio was handed over to Pope Julius II. The city was returned to the House of Este after the death of Hadrian VI on 29 September 1523. In 1551 Ercole II d'Este destroyed the suburbs of the city in his program of reconstruction of the walls. At the end of the century work on the city's famous Basilica della Ghiara began, on the site where a miracle was believed to have occurred. The Este rule continued until 1796, with short interruptions in 1702 and 1733–1734.

=== Napoleonic age and restoration ===
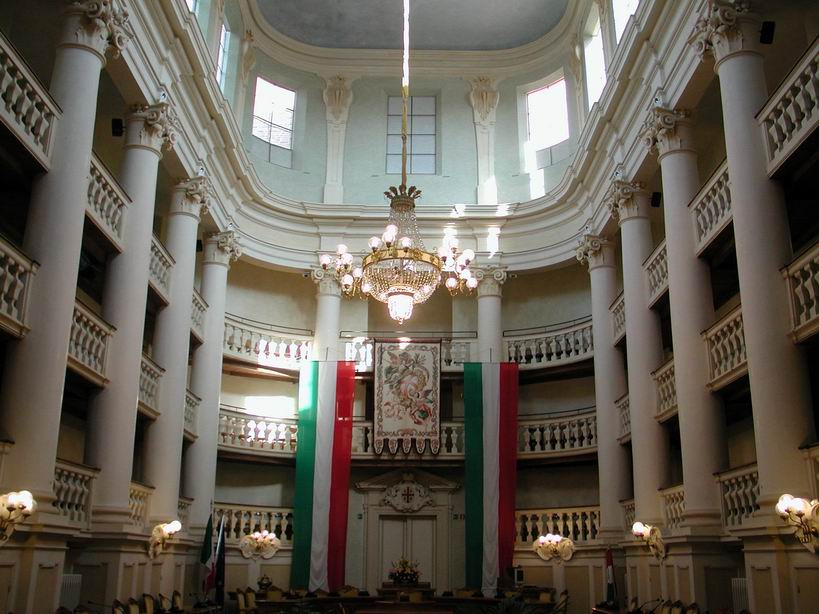
The Tricolore's Room, in the Town Hall, is where for the first time the Italian flag's three colours were adopted

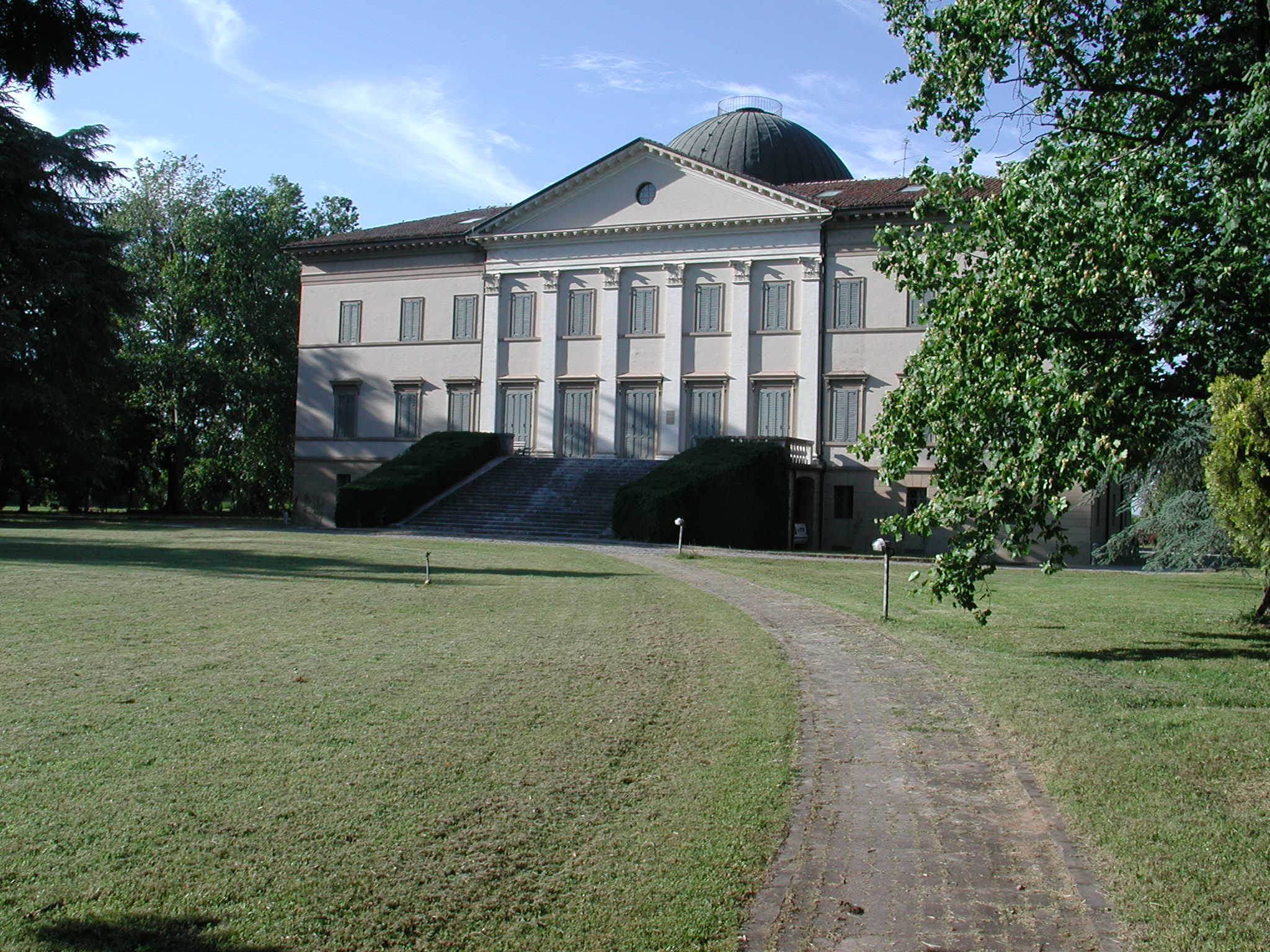
Villa Levi, now belonging to the Department of Animal Sciences of the University of Bologna

The arrival of the republican French troops was greeted with enthusiasm in the city. On 21 August 1796, the ducal garrison of 600 men was driven off, and the Senate claimed the rule of Reggio and its duchy. On 26 September, the Provisional Government's volunteers pushed back an Austrian column, in the Battle of Montechiarugolo. Though minor, this clash is considered the first one of the Italian Risorgimento. Napoleon himself awarded the Reggiani with 500 rifles and 4 guns. Later he occupied Emilia and formed a new province, the Cispadane Republic, whose existence was proclaimed in Reggio on 7 January 1797. The Italian national flag, named Il Tricolore ('the tricolour'), was sewn on that occasion by Reggio women. In this period of patriotic fervour, Jozef Wybicki, a lieutenant in the Polish troops of General Jan Henryk Dąbrowski, an ally of Napoleon, composed in Reggio the Mazurek Dąbrowskiego, which in 1927 became the Polish national anthem.

The 1815 Treaty of Vienna returned Reggio to Francis IV of Austria-Este, but in 1831 Modena rose up against him, and Reggio followed its example organizing a corps under the command of General Carlo Zucchi. However, on 9 March, the Duke conquered the city with his escort of Austrian soldiers.

In 1848, Duke Francis V left his estate fearing a revolution and Reggio proclaimed its union with Piedmont. The latter's defeat at the Battle of Novara brought the city back under Este control. In 1859 Reggio, under dictator Luigi Carlo Farini, became part of united Italy and, with the plebiscite of 10 March 1860, definitively entered the new unified kingdom.

=== Contemporary history ===
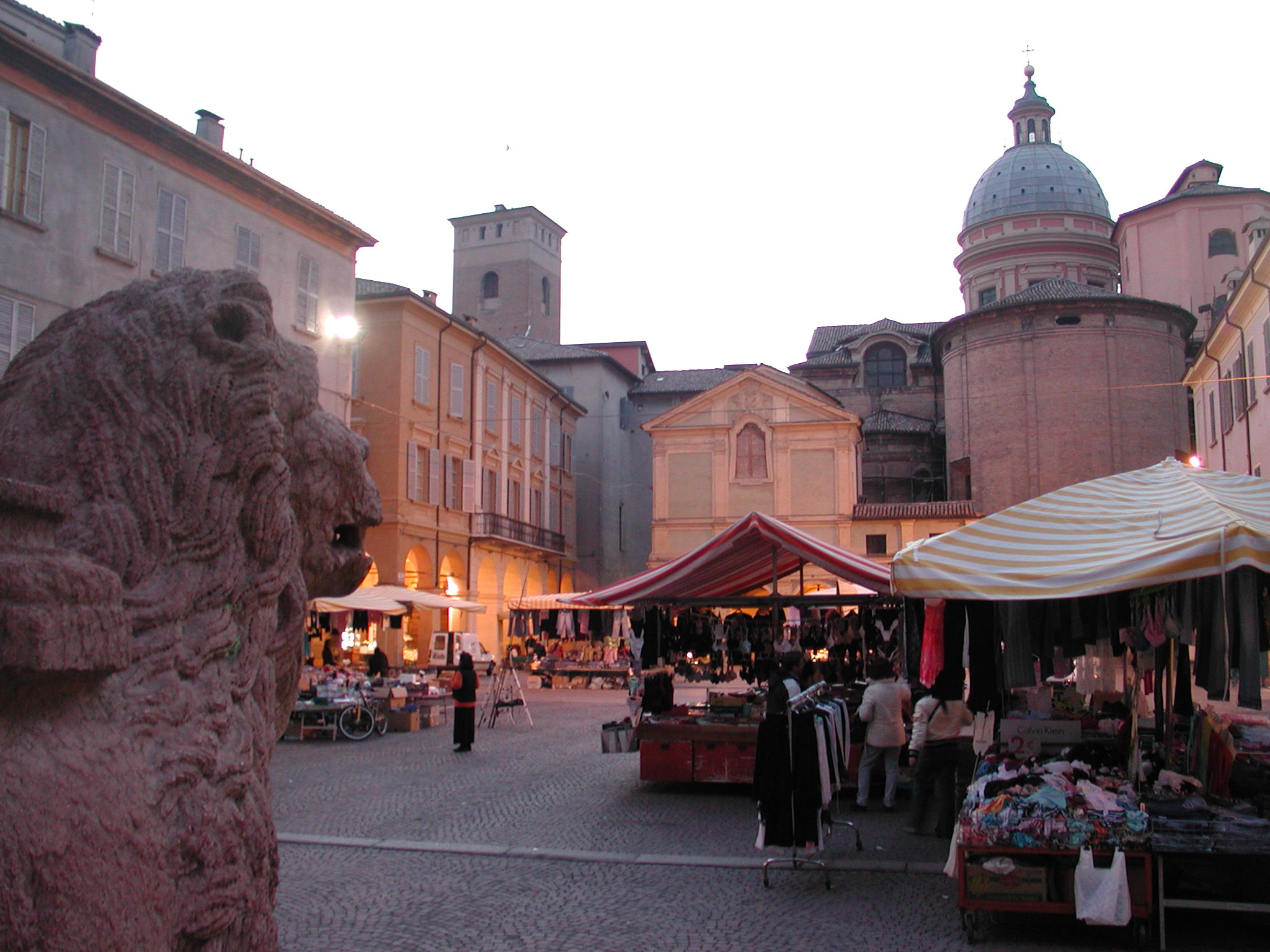
Piazza San Prospero seen from the patron saint's basilica

Reggio then went through a period of economic and population growth from 1873 to the destruction of the ancient walls. In 1911, it had 70,000 inhabitants. A strong socialist tradition grew. On 7 July, the city hosted the 13th National Congress of the Italian Socialist Party. On 26 July 1943, the fascist regime's fall was cheered with enthusiasm by the Reggiani. Numerous partisan bands were formed in the city and surrounding countryside.

On 27 April 2023 the city was declared a European Capital of Inclusion and Diversity by the European Commission.

=== Jewish history ===
Jews began arriving to Reggio in the early 15th century. Many Jews were Sephardim from Spain, Portugal and other parts of Italy. Nearly all were fleeing religious persecution. The Jewish community was prosperous and enjoyed considerable growth for the next several hundred years. The Synagogue of Reggio Emilia was relocated in 1672 into the ghetto, and rebuilt in 1858.

After the Napoleonic era the Jews of Reggio gained emancipation and began to migrate to other parts of Europe looking for greater economic and social freedom. Thus, the Jewish community in Reggio began to lower. The German occupation during World War II and the Holocaust hastened the decline. Today, only one Jew remains in Reggio Emilia. The Jewish Community of Reggio Emilia was merged with Modena's. However, an unused synagogue and burial ground still exist. In 2016 the City Council posed some small street plates in front of the houses of the deported Jews to preserve their remembrance.

Many notable rabbinic scholars have resided in Reggio. These include Isaac Foa, Immanuel Sonino, Obadiah ben Israel Sforno, Nathan ben Reuben David Spira, Menahem Azariah Fano, Baruch Abraham ben Elhanan David Foa, Hezekiah ben Isaac Foa, Isaac ben Vardama Foa, Israel Nissim Foa, Israel Solomon Longhi, Isaiah Mordecai ben Israel Hezekiah Bassani, Israel Benjamin ben Isaiah Bassani, Elhanan David Carmi, Benjamin ben Eliezer ha-Kohen, Joshua ben Raphael Fermi, Moses Benjamin Foa, Abram Michael Fontanella, Judah Ḥayyim Fontanella, Israel Berechiah Fontanella, Raphael Jehiel Sanguinetti, Isaac Samson d'Angeli, R. J. Bolognese, Hananiah Elhanan Ḥai ha-Kohen, Jacob Levi, Moses Benjamin Levi, Israel Berechiah Sanguinetti, David Jacob Maroni, Giuseppe Lattes, Alessandro da Fano, Lazzaro Laide Tedesco, and Shimshon Chaim Nachmani.

== Climate ==
The climate in Reggio Emilia is temperate continental, with hot, rather moist summers. The temperature can sometimes rise above 35 °C (95 °F). Winters are fairly frigid, with frequent frosts and the temperature may go below -10 °C (14 °F). April, October and November are the rainiest months, while January and July are the driest, though precipitation is generally evenly distributed throughout the year. Due to rather high temperatures, snow rarely accumulates in the city, despite consistent annual snowfall.

During autumn and winter it is very common, especially in the areas outside the city, to encounter very thick fog, although it is less frequent than in the past. Other meteorological phenomena that can be expected in the area are rain, freezing rain during winter, and hail during summer and rarely in the spring.

The area is not particularly windy and there are often days of total calm, especially during the anticyclonic phases in winter, while spring is more windy. The most intense winds are the ones blowing from northeast (Bora) or from southwest (Libeccio). The latter, during its descent from the Northern Apennines, sometimes tends to become a downslope wind and thus is very dry and hot. Rarely, Foehn wind from the Alps can reach Reggio Emilia from the northwest. In the city, the average annual high temperature is 18 °C (64 °F), the annual low temperature is 9 °C (48 °F), and the annual precipitation is 700 millimetres (27.56 inches).

Climate data for Reggio Emilia (1991–2020)
Month	Jan	Feb	Mar	Apr	May	Jun	Jul	Aug	Sep	Oct	Nov	Dec	Year
Mean daily maximum °C (°F)	7.6 (45.7)	10.5 (50.9)	16.1 (61.0)	20.1 (68.2)	25.1 (77.2)	29.7 (85.5)	32.3 (90.1)	32.0 (89.6)	26.2 (79.2)	19.3 (66.7)	12.5 (54.5)	7.9 (46.2)	19.9 (67.9)
Daily mean °C (°F)	4.3 (39.7)	6.3 (43.3)	11.0 (51.8)	14.8 (58.6)	19.5 (67.1)	23.9 (75.0)	26.1 (79.0)	26.2 (79.2)	21.1 (70.0)	15.3 (59.5)	9.3 (48.7)	4.5 (40.1)	15.2 (59.3)
Mean daily minimum °C (°F)	1.1 (34.0)	2.2 (36.0)	5.9 (42.6)	9.5 (49.1)	13.9 (57.0)	18.1 (64.6)	20.3 (68.5)	20.2 (68.4)	15.9 (60.6)	11.5 (52.7)	6.6 (43.9)	1.9 (35.4)	10.6 (51.1)
Average precipitation mm (inches)	35.9 (1.41)	49.5 (1.95)	50.5 (1.99)	72.8 (2.87)	66.7 (2.63)	65.6 (2.58)	35.8 (1.41)	35.9 (1.41)	62.0 (2.44)	82.6 (3.25)	93.5 (3.68)	55.0 (2.17)	705.8 (27.79)
Average precipitation days (≥ 1.0 mm)	5	6	6	8	6	6	3	5	6	8	8	6	73
Source 1: Arpae Emilia-Romagna
Source 2: Climi e viaggi (precipitation days)

== Demographics ==
Historical population
Year	Pop.	±%
1861	46,856	—
1871	50,955	+8.7%
1881	50,759	−0.4%
1901	58,993	+16.2%
1911	70,955	+20.3%
1921	82,011	+15.6%
1931	89,605	+9.3%
1936	93,913	+4.8%
1951	106,726	+13.6%
1961	116,445	+9.1%
1971	128,789	+10.6%
1981	130,376	+1.2%
1991	132,030	+1.3%
2001	141,877	+7.5%
2011	162,082	+14.2%
2021	169,908	+4.8%
Source: ISTAT

As of 2026, the population is 172,921, of which 49.9% are males, and 50.1% are females. Minors make up 15.4% of the population, and seniors make up 21.9%.

=== Immigration ===
As of 2025, immigrants make up 20.2% of the population. The 5 largest foreign countries of birth are Albania, Morocco, Egypt, Ukraine, and Moldova.

Foreign population by country of birth (2025)
Country	Population
Albania	3,772
Morocco	2,827
Egypt	2,797
Ukraine	2,527
Moldova	2,145
China	2,074
Nigeria	1,738
Romania	1,594
Ghana	1,502
Tunisia	1,288
Georgia	1,137
Pakistan	850
Senegal	613
Sri Lanka	585
Brazil	574

== Administration ==
=== Frazioni (hamlets) ===
- Bagno
- Cadè
- Canali
- Cavazzoli
- Castellazzo
- Cella
- Codemondo
- Corticella
- Coviolo
- Fogliano
- Gaida
- Gavassa
- Gavasseto
- Mancasale
- Marmirolo
- Masone
- Massenzatico
- Ospizio
- Pieve Modolena
- Pratofontana
- Rivalta
- Roncadella
- Roncocesi
- Sabbione
- San Bartolomeo
- San Maurizio
- San Pellegrino
- San Prospero Strinati
- Sesso

=== Boroughs ===
- Acque Chiare
- Baragalla
- Buco del Signore
- Canalina
- Centro Storico (Historical Centre)
- Lungocrostolo
- Mirabello
- Ospedale (Hospital)
- Ospizio
- Quartier Giardino
- Rosta Nuova
- Stazione (Railway station)

== Sights ==
=== Religious buildings ===
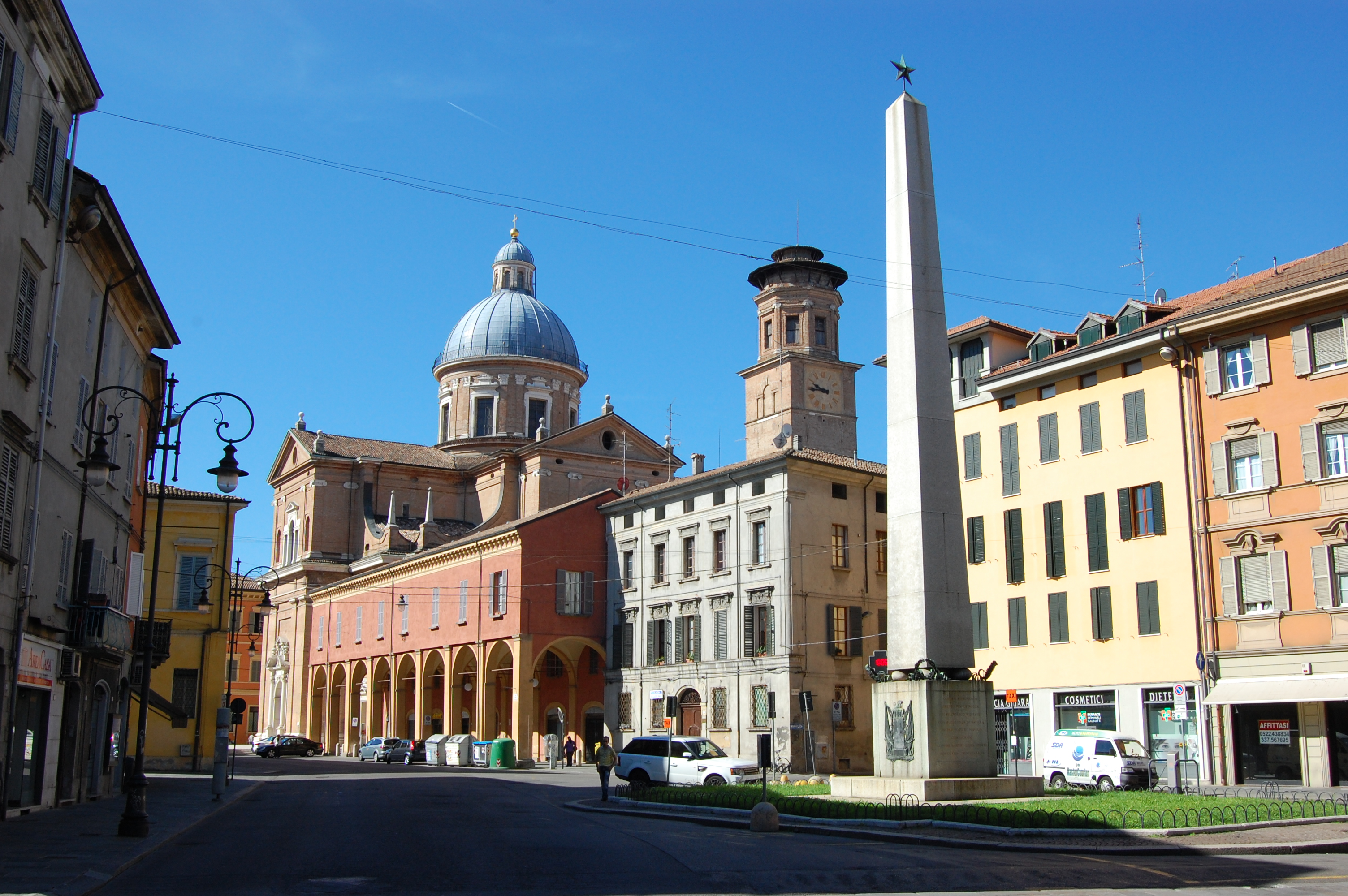
Tempio della Beata Vergine della Ghiara

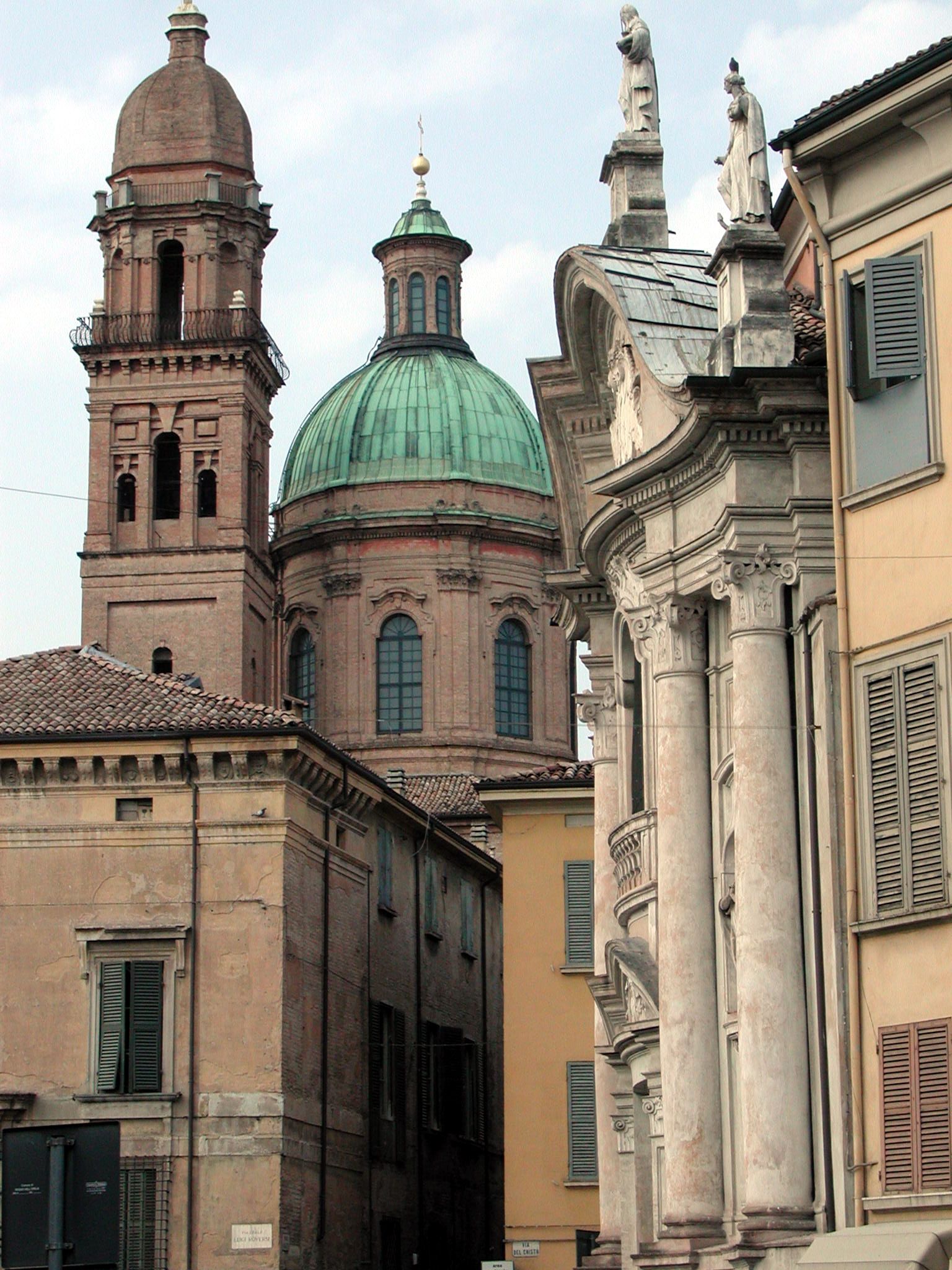
The Baroque church of San Giorgio

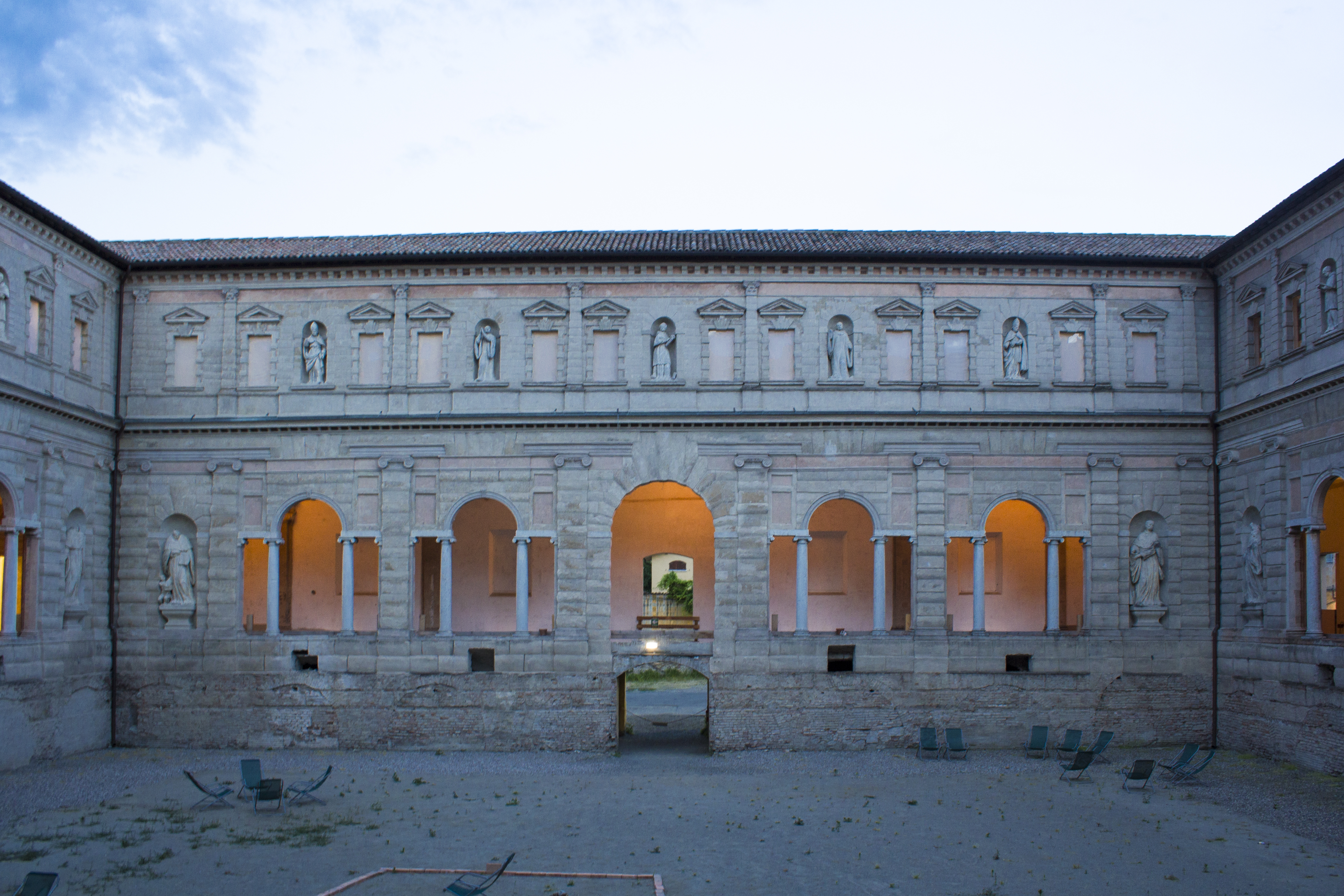
Greater cloister of San Pietro

- Basilica della Ghiara: Main church of the city; begun in 1597, and completed in Baroque style.
- Basilica di San Prospero: Built in the 10th century and dedicated to Prosper of Reggio, a bishop of the city, it was rebuilt by Luca Corti and Matteo Fiorentini between 1514 and 1523. The façade, with eleven statues of saints and patrones, was redesigned by Giovan Battista Cattani in the mid-18th century. It includes a pleasant belfry/tower, begun in 1535 and never quite finished, with an octagonal plan. The interior of the church has a Latin cross plan, with three naves. The apse houses the splendid fresco Last Judgement, by the Bolognese artist Camillo Procaccini. Also noteworthy are the wooden choir from 1546 and the Assumption altarpiece by Tommaso Laureti and Ludovico Carracci (1602).
- Cathedral: Built in the 9th to 12th centuries. It was rebuilt in the second half of the 16th century. It has three naves with works by Guercino, Palma the Younger, Prospero Spani and Alessandro Tiarini.
- Baptistery of Saint John the Baptist.
- Sant'Agostino: church once dedicated to Saint Apollinaris, its dedication was changed to St Augustine in 1268 when it was rebuilt, along with the annexed convent, by the Augustinian friars. It was restored in 1452, when the tower was also erected. The current interior dates from 1645 to 1666, while the façade (1746) was designed by Alfonso Torreggiani and built by Giovan Battista Cattani. Its restored theatre hosted Model European Parliament sessions in 2015.
- The small Baroque Christ's Oratory.
- San Girolamo e Vitale: church mentioned in document in 857 and rebuilt in 1646 by Gaspare Vigarani. It consists of three separate churches in the same building, two above ground and one underground; the crypt church houses a replica of the Holy Sepulcher in Jerusalem.
- San Francesco: church.
- San Giorgio: Baroque church with cupola (1746) designed by Alfonso Torreggiani.
- San Giovannino: (1545) church houses Baroque frescoes (1613) by Sisto Badalocchio, Lorenzo Franchi, Tommaso Sandrini, Paolo Guidotti and paintings by Tiarini.
- Chiesa di San Pietro (1586): church designed by Giulio della Torre; cupola erected in 1625, façade in 1782, while the cloisters in the 16th century (the small cloister by Bartolomeo Spani in 1520, the works in the main cloister ended in 1580). The interior is in a Latin cross shape with a single nave. It houses notable Baroque paintings by Alessandro Tiarini, Pietro Desani, Luca da Reggio, Camillo Gavasetti and Paolo Emilio Besenzi.
- San Filippo Neri: Baroque church dedicated to St Philip Neri.
- San Spiridione Oratory
- San Stefano: church first mentioned when its site was outside the city walls, as a Templars' church.
- Synagogue of Reggio Emilia: rebuilt in 1845 by Pietro Marchelli.
- Chiesa Battista la Verità: Main Baptist church of Reggio Emilia.
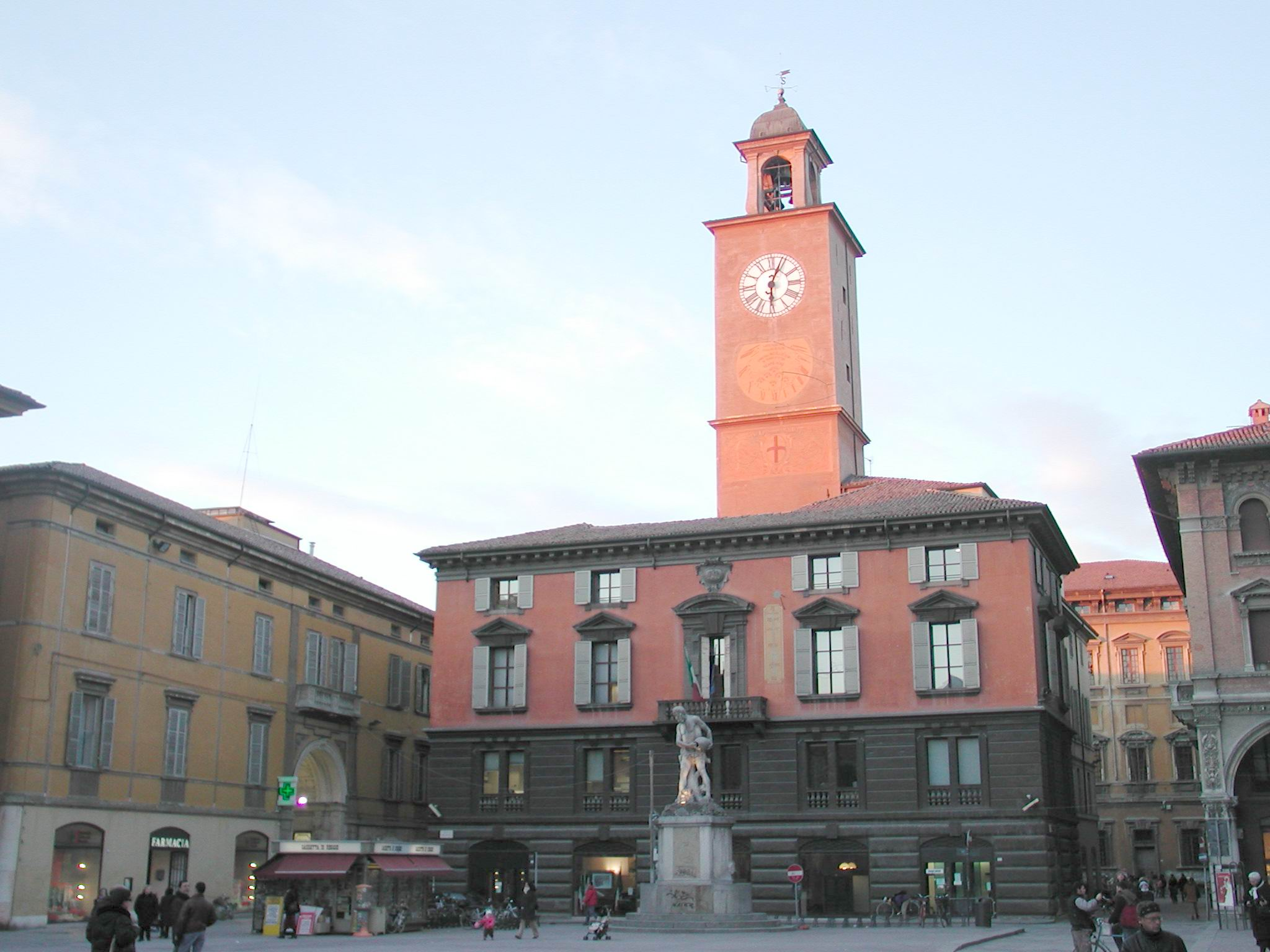
Palazzo del Monte in Piazza del Duomo, with the Fountain of River Crostolo

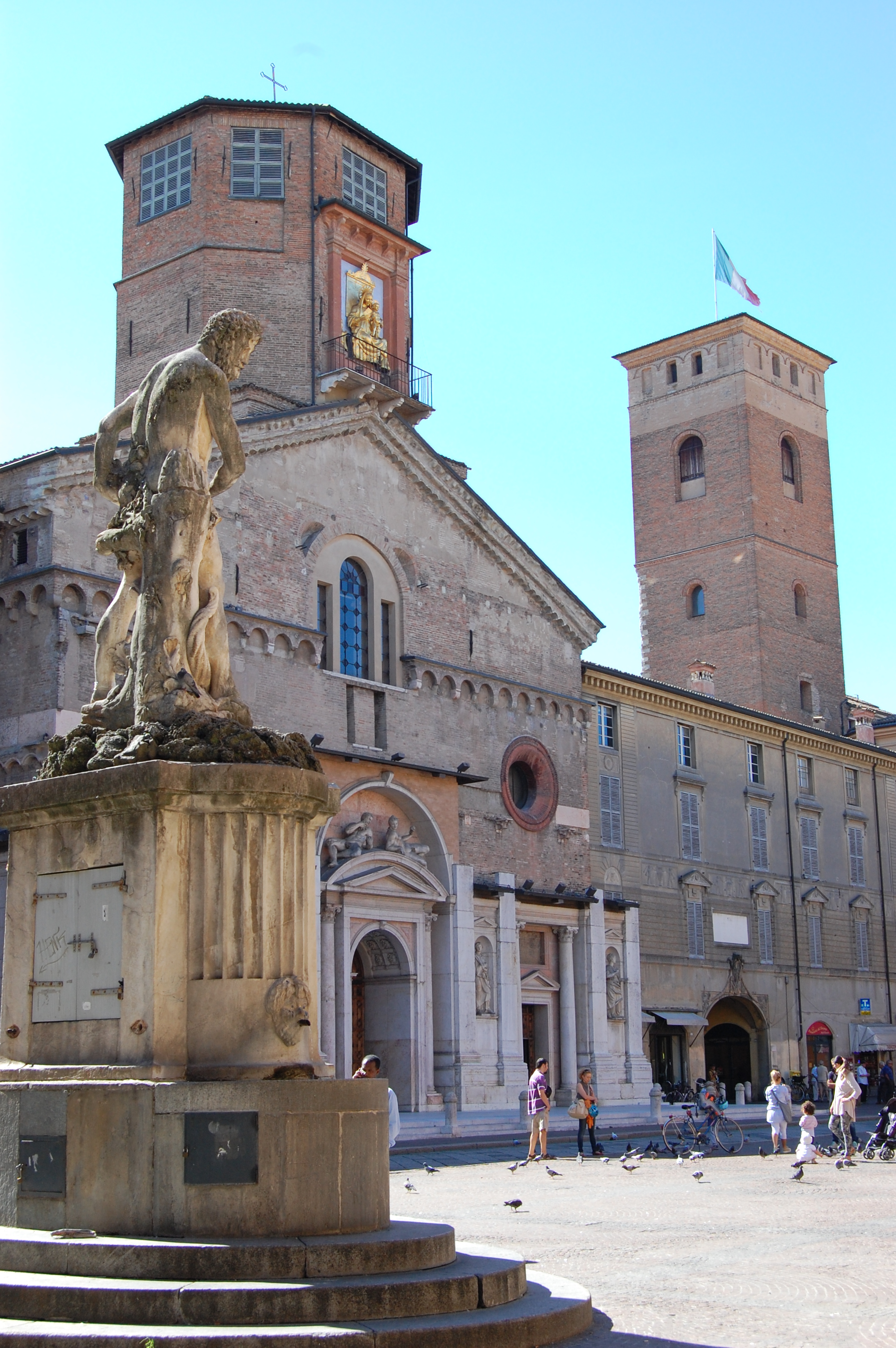
Piazza Prampolini

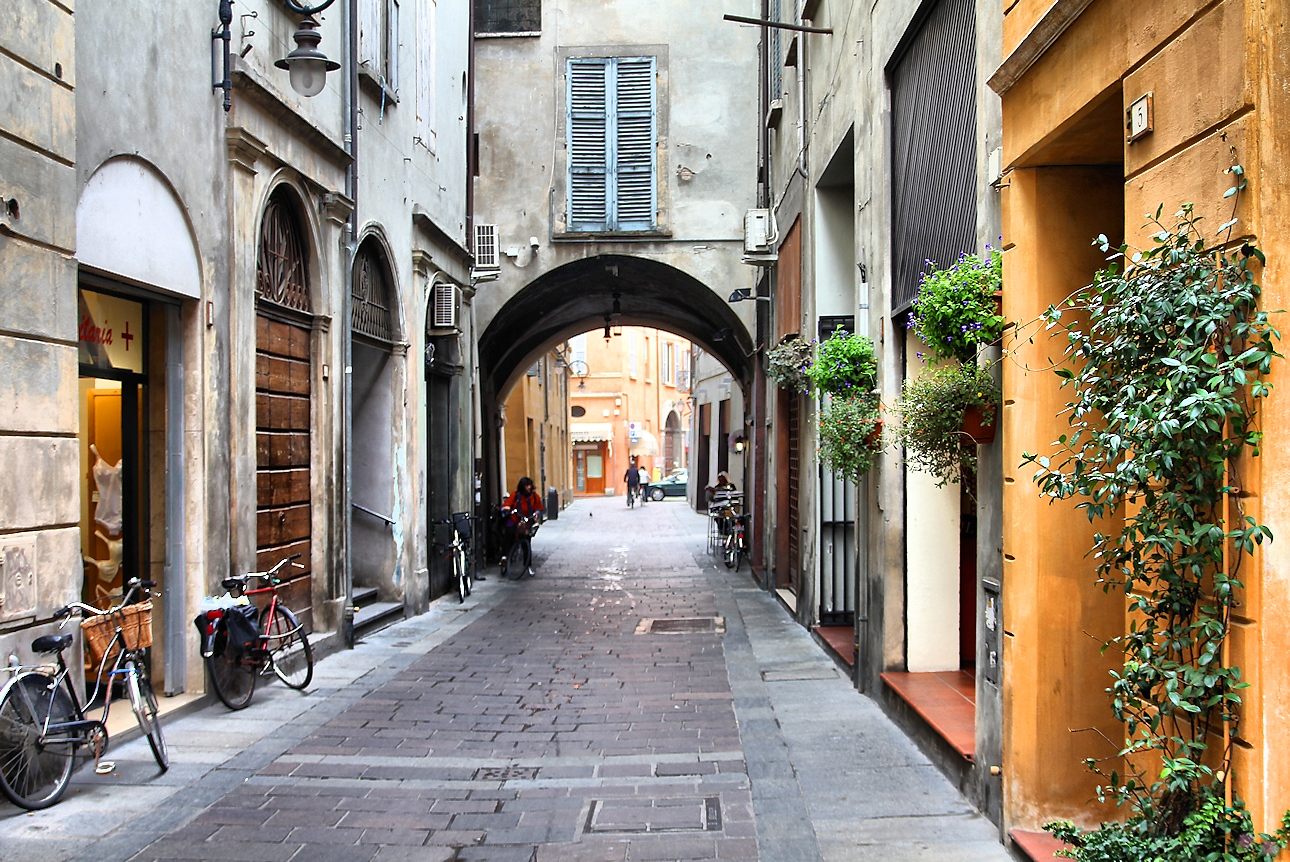
Old town street in Reggio Emilia

=== Secular buildings ===
- Bishop's Palace
- Palazzo dei Musei
- Palazzo Ancini
- Palazzo Busetti
- Palazzo del Capitano del Popolo – Built in 1280, restored in 1432 and again in the 1920s, when its northern and western façades were embellished with Ghibelline merlons and the crests of ancient Reggio's Captains and Communities. Inside is the Sala dei Difensori ("Defenders' Room"), a wide hall once used by the citizens' council.
- Palazzo del Carbone
- Palazzo Cassoli
- Palazzo Cassoli – Tirelli
- Palazzo Comunale – Begun in 1414, it houses the Tricolore Hall and the Museum of the Italian Flag. The Torre del Bordello ("Brothel Tower"), built in 1489, contains a museum on the Reggiani uprisings of 1796–1831.
- Palazzo Corbelli – 19th-century palace with a façade designed by Pietro Marchelli.

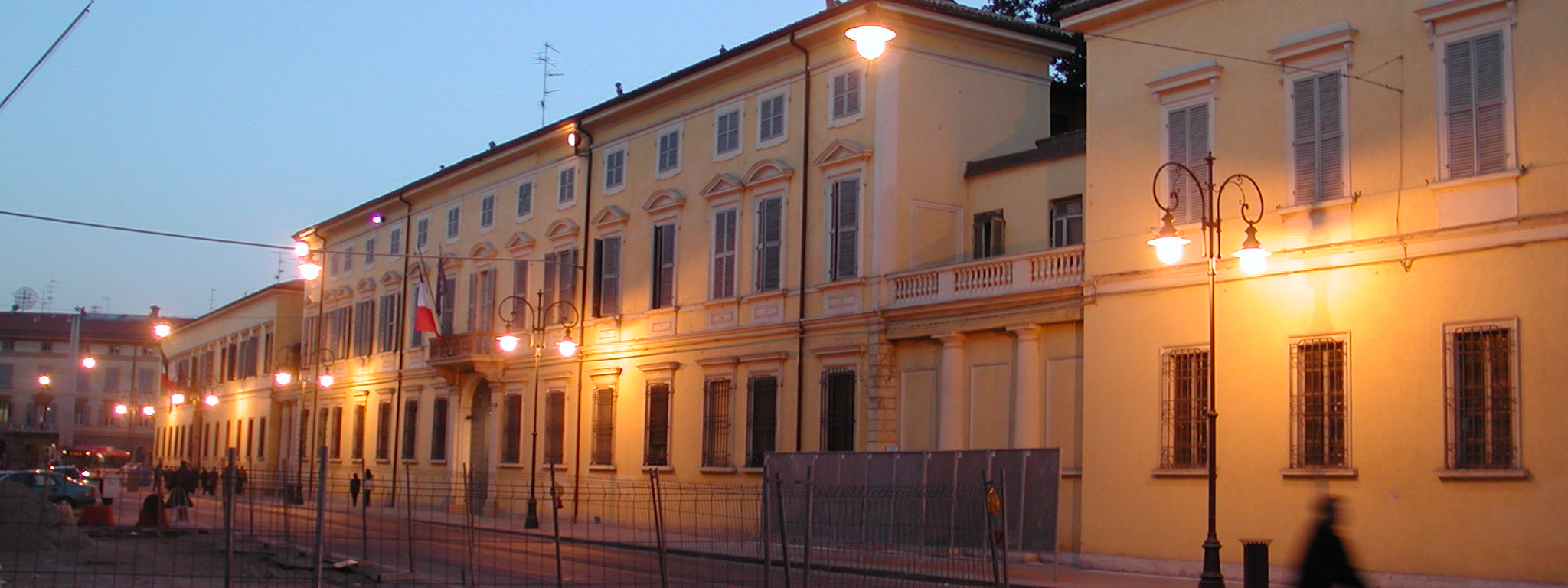
Palazzo Ducale in Reggio Emilia

- Palazzo Ducale – 18th-century palace. See Italian article.
- Palazzo Fontanelli Sacrati
- Palazzo Magnani
- Palazzo Masdoni
- Palazzo da Mosto
- Palazzo Pratonieri
- Palazzo San Giorgio
- Palazzo Scaruffi
- Palazzo Spalletti-Trivelli
- Palazzo Tirelli
- Palazzo Torello Malaspina
- Teatro Municipale – Neoclassical building.
- Teatro Ariosto – See Italian article.
- Monumento ai Caduti, Parco del Popolo – Erected in 1927.
- Monument to the Concordi – Ancient Roman monument located in Parco del Popolo.

=== Bridges ===
- Autostrada A1 bridges, three bridges designed by Santiago Calatrava and opened in 2005–2006. The three bridges connect the Austostrada del Sole A1 (the main Italian north to south motorway) to the city of Reggio Emilia. A central arch bridge spans the Milan-Bologna high-speed railway line and the motorway, while twin cable-stayed bridges are at either end. The twin bridges pass over service roundabouts and access roads to allow connections with the adjacent Reggio Emilia AV Mediopadana high-speed railway station.

In 2009, the European Convention for Constructional Steelwork gave the three bridges a European Steel Design Award, stating that the twin bridges' original visual effects at different angles give the two bridges "the aspect of huge musical instruments."

== Economy ==
The economy of the province of Reggio Emilia was for a long time based on agriculture. One typical product, known worldwide and imitated, is Parmigiano-Reggiano cheese. Another is Lambrusco wine. Reggio Emilia also produces balsamic vinegar, a condiment for salad but also cheese, strawberries and many other dishes. In the twentieth century the city and its territory also saw a rapid development of small and medium industries, particularly in the sector of agricultural machinery. For more than 100 years, there has been a strong tradition that supported the development of consumers' cooperatives, as well as building and banking cooperatives. New developments in mechanics and information technology are at the origin of some new companies operating in mechatronics. Another well-established sector is the ceramic tile industry, mainly concentrated in the districts of Scandiano and Casalgrande.

Other leading sectors include: electronics (Cellular Line, Phonocar, RCF audio); finance (Credito Emiliano); Iris Ceramica; fashion (Marina Rinaldi, Max Mara); food (NewPrinces S.p.A.); machinery (ARGO SpA, Emak, Interpump Group, Landi Renzo, Lombardini S.r.l.; Preston & Barbieri, Smeg); and utilities (Iren).

Industrial growth has attracted immigration from North and Central Africa, East Europe, and Far East (China, Pakistan, India). The immigration rate in the province is about 25%. Research indicates that Reggio Emilia ranks very high in quality of life among Italian provinces.

== Transport ==
Reggio Emilia railway station, opened in 1859, forms part of the Milan–Bologna railway. It is also a terminus of three secondary railways, linking Reggio Emilia with Ciano d'Enza, Guastalla and Sassuolo, respectively. The station is situated at Piazza Guglielmo Marconi, at the eastern edge of the city centre.

The other major railway station, Reggio Emilia AV Mediopadana, is on the Milan–Bologna high-speed railway (there is also a connection with Reggio Emilia-Guastalla railway). It is located at the Mancasale locality, approximately 4 kilometres (2.5 miles) north from the city centre.

Along with this, there is a plan to construct a tram in the city. The tram will run from the Mancasale Industrial zone in the north to Rivalta in the south, stopping at the Reggio Emilia AV Mediopadana railway station, Reggio Emilia railway station and other neighborhoods. The tram system has undergone a feasibility study, and is set to open in 2026.

A small general aviation airport, Reggio Emilia Airport, is 1.5 km east of the city. The nearest airport with airline services is Bologna Guglielmo Marconi Airport, located approximately 68 km from Reggio Emilia.

== Education ==
The Reggio Emilia approach to preschool education was started by the schools of Reggio Emilia after World War II and is well-known around the world. It is based and inspired on theories of Malaguzzi, Bruner, Vygotsky, Dewey, Piaget and Gardner. Reggio Emilia holds the Loris Malaguzzi International Centre, a modern structure where the Reggio Emilia approach is implemented, exported and spread around the world.

== Sport ==
Reggio Emilia is home to various professional sports clubs and arenas:

- Pallacanestro Reggiana, which competes in Lega Basket Serie A and has won 1 Italian Supercup and 1 Eurochallenge.
- A.C. Reggiana 1919, a football team which competes in Serie C.
- Valorugby Emilia, playing in Serie A Elite (top Italian rugby division).
- Volley Tricolore, playing in Serie A3.
- Olimpia Regium, playing in futsal Serie A2.

The main sports venues in the city are:

- Stadio Città del Tricolore (23,717 capacity), located near the A1 highway and home to Reggiana and U.S. Sassuolo home games.
- PalaBigi (4,500 capacity), located in city centre.
- Stadio Mirabello (4,500 capacity), located in the city centre.
- Palasport Fanticini, located in the Tribunal hub.
- Stadio Canalina, located in the Canalina borough.

== Notable people ==
- Elvis Abbruscato, former footballer and football manager
- Daniele Adani, former footballer and television pundit
- Carlo Ancelotti, football manager and former footballer
- Luca Ariatti, former footballer
- Ludovico Ariosto, poet
- Stefano Baldini, Olympic marathon champion
- Benny Benassi, musician and DJ
- Orietta Berti, singer
- Mattia Binotto, Formula 1 team principal
- Matteo Maria Boiardo, poet
- Kobe Bryant, American basketball player. He lived in Reggio Emilia in his youth.
- Nicolò Bulega, MotoGP and Superbike rider
- Fratelli Cervi
- Riccardo Cervi, basketball player
- Philip Corner, composer, Fluxus artist
- Black Box (band), band
- Graziano Delrio, politician
- Davide Dionigi, former footballer and football manager
- Giuseppe Dossetti, politician
- Zucchero Fornaciari, singer
- Sonia Ganassi, opera singer
- Gino Giaroli, former footballer
- Luigi Ghirri, photographer
- Giovanni Guicciardi, opera singer
- Nilde Iotti, politician
- Maurizio Landini, general secretary of CGIL
- Luciano Ligabue, singer
- Hachim Mastour, footballer
- Nicolò Melli, basketball player
- Federico Mussini, basketball player
- Antonio Pacchioni, scientist
- Romano Prodi, economist and politician
- Serge Reggiani, actor and singer
- Meuccio Ruini, politician
- Angelo Secchi, scientist
- Marco Silvestri, footballer
- Lazzaro Spallanzani, scientist
- Ferruccio Tagliavini, opera singer
- Pier Vittorio Tondelli, writer
- Romolo Valli, actor
- Giovanni Battista Venturi, scientist
- Ermete Zacconi, actor
- Iva Zanicchi, singer and politician
- Cesare Zavattini, writer and painter
- CCCP - Fedeli alla linea, band
- Offlaga Disco Pax, band
- Raw Power (band), band

=== Painters and sculptors ===
- Giacomo Benevelli
- Francesco Burani
- Antonio da Correggio ("Il Correggio")
- Raffaellino da Reggio
- Paolo da San Leocadio
- Luca Ferrari ("Luca da Reggio")
- Antonio Fontanesi
- Anselmo Govi
- Cristoforo Munari
- Lelio Orsi
- Prospero Spani ("Il Clemente")
- Antonio Ligabue

== International relations ==
- Reggio Emilia is a pilot city of the Council of Europe and the European Commission Intercultural cities programme.
- Reggio Emilia is a member city of Eurotowns network.

=== Twin towns – sister cities ===
Reggio Emilia is twinned with:

- Beit Jala, Palestine
- Bydgoszcz, Poland
- Chișinău, Moldova
- Dijon, France
- Fort Worth, United States
- Girona, Spain
- Kragujevac, Serbia
- Pemba, Mozambique
- Polokwane, South Africa
- Schwerin, Germany
- Zadar, Croatia

=== Friendship ===
- Ekurhuleni, South Africa
- Nablus, Palestine
- Rio Branco, Brazil
- Rizhao, China
