= San Giorgio, Reggio Emilia =

Church in Reggio nell'Emilia, Italy

Coordinates: 44.6511°N 10.6203°E

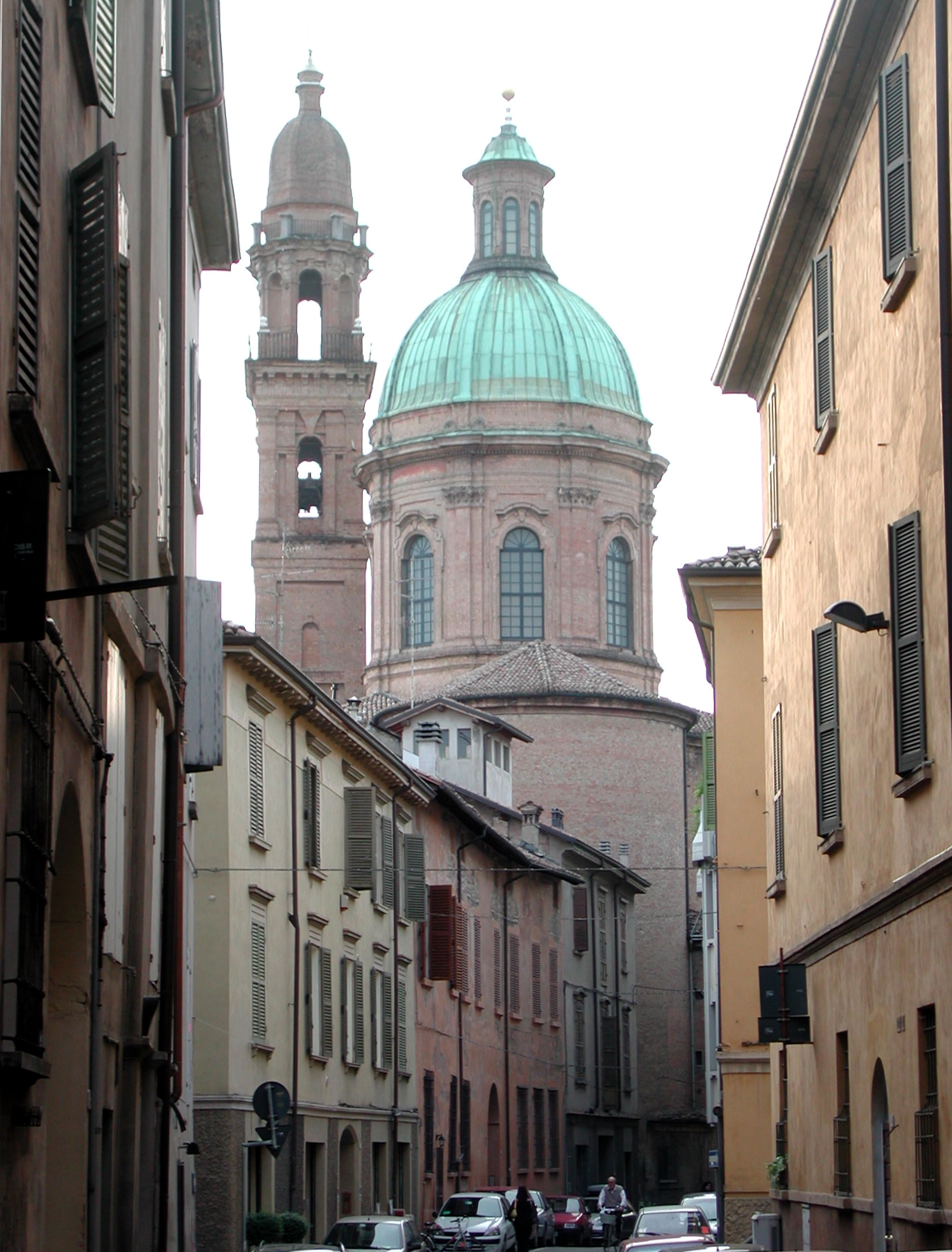
Dome and Bell-tower of church of St George, Reggio Emilia, Italy

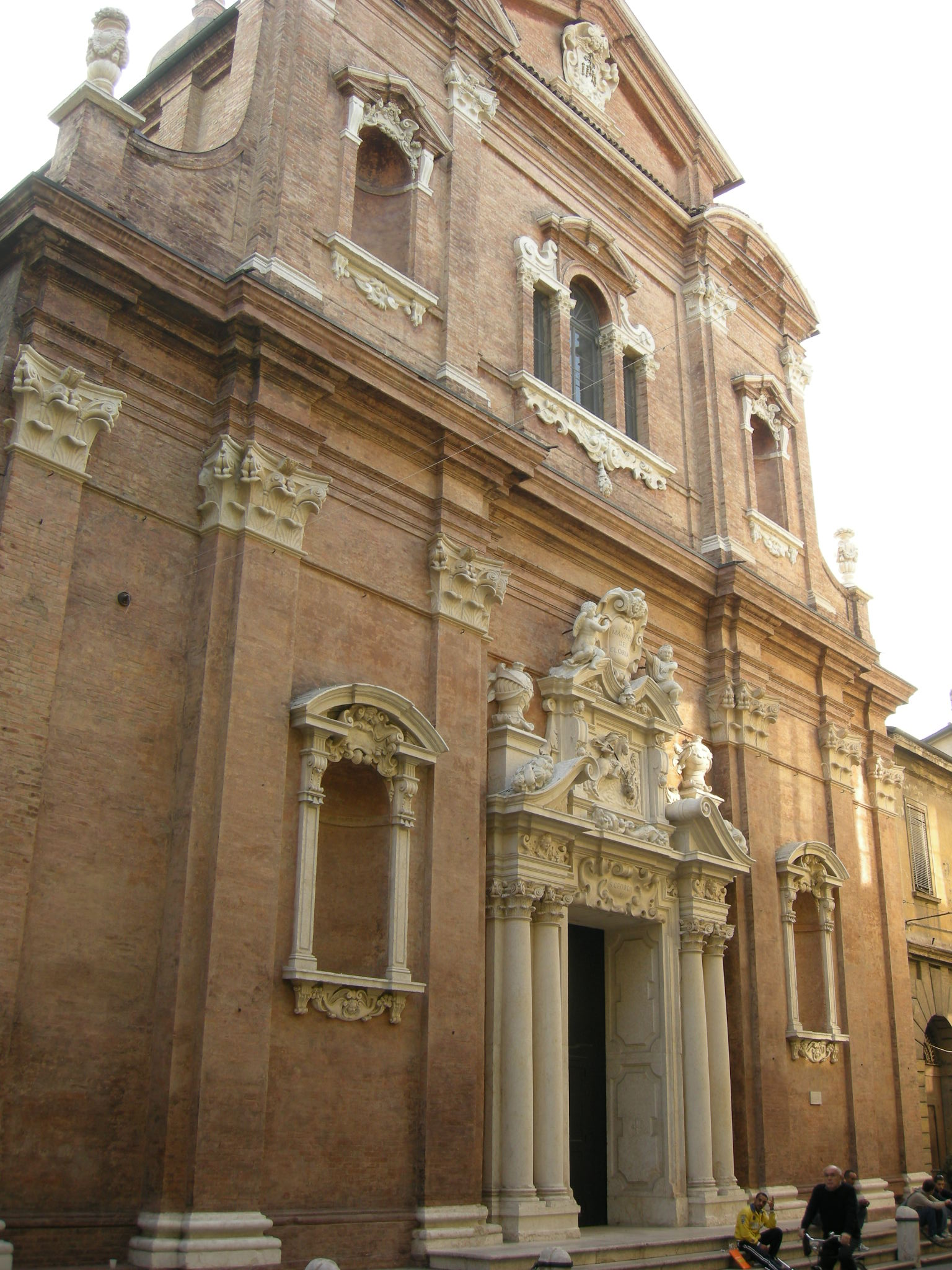
Facade with helmets flanking a bas relief of St George slaying the Dragon

San Giorgio (Church of St George) is a Roman Catholic church located on via Farini in Reggio Emilia, Italy. Across the street is Palazzo San Giorgio, now Biblioteca Panizzi.

== History ==
A church at the site dedicated to St George was first documented in 1146. A 15th-century reconstruction ensued. In 1610 the church was assigned to the Jesuits, who performed extensive refurbishments. Between 1675 and 1678, the bell tower, dome and the entrance portal were erected.

Above the main portal of the façade is a marble bas-relief depicting St George Slaying the Dragon. The interior has a Latin Cross plan. The church no longer has the rich complement of paintings once in the side altars.

The Pernicelli chapel was restored in 2009 and houses an altarpiece depicting Saints Ignatius and Francis Xavier adoring the Blessed Virgin of Ghiara (1640) by Alessandro Tiarini.
