= Palazzo San Giorgio, Reggio Emilia =

Palace in northern Italy

Coordinates: 44.69650°N 10.62930°E

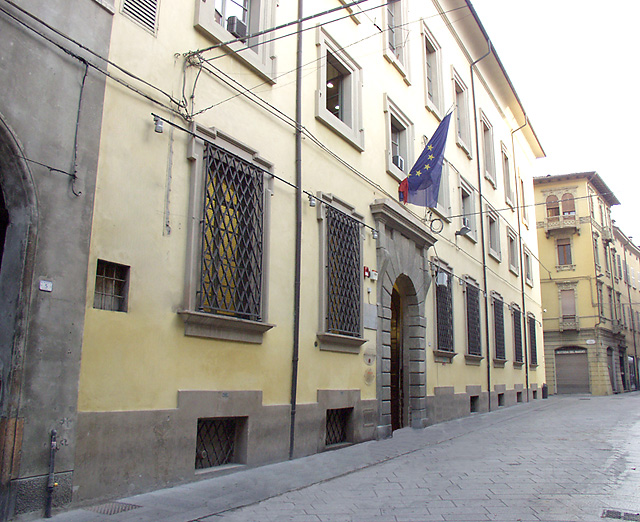
Facade of former Palazzo San Giorgio, now Biblioteca Panizzi

The Palazzo San Giorgio is a palace with a main facade located on Via Farini #3, across from the church of San Giorgio in the historic center of the town of Reggio Emilia in Italy. it presently houses one of the properties of the town library: Biblioteca Municipale Panizzi.

In the early 18th century, a building on the site, was originally commissioned by the Jesuit order to house a school and college. In 1773, when the Jesuits were suppressed in the Duchy, the palace became property of the Canons Regular from the parish of Santissimi Salvatore, and still was used as a school.
