= Villa Levi, Coviolo =

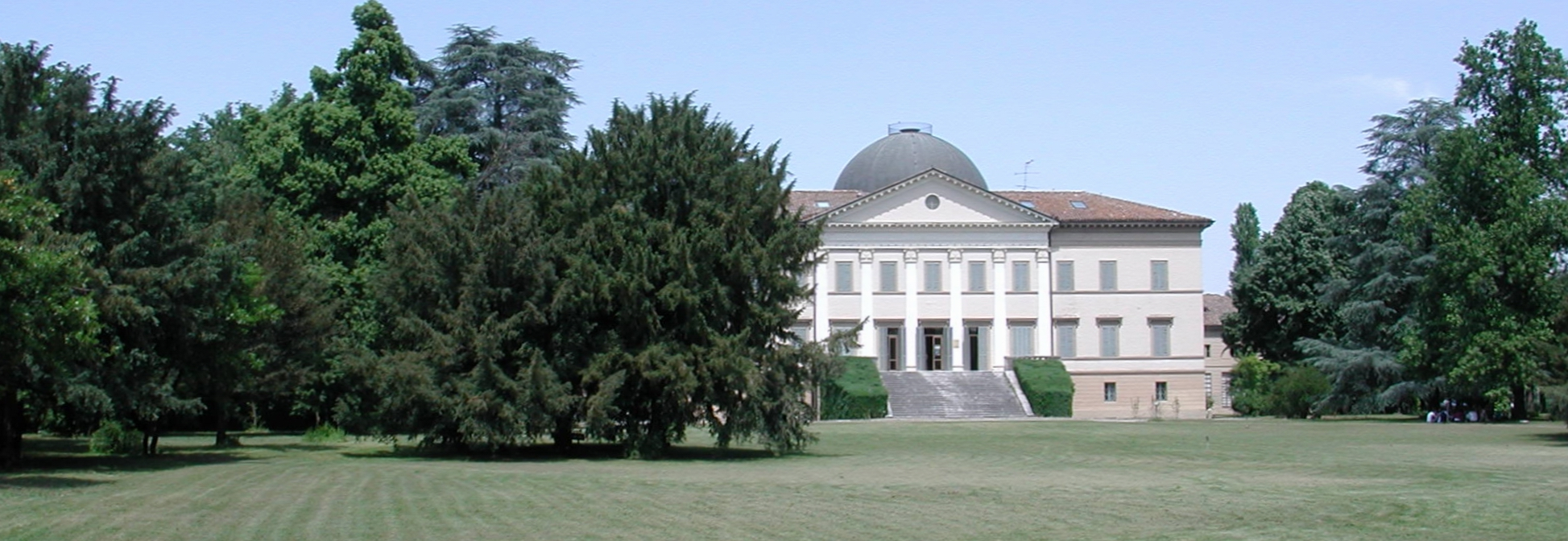
Villa Levi

Villa Levi is a neoclassical architecture-style rural palace located on via Fratelli Rosselli 107 in Coviolo, an hamlet of Reggio Emilia, capital city of the homonymous Province, Region of Emilia-Romagna, Italy.

== History ==
A rural house at this site was first commissioned in the first half of the 17th century by the Besenzi family. However the layout we see today was mainly due to reconstructions that took place between 1790 and 1830, under the designs of Domenico Marchelli, who also help layout the Gardens and the long staircase leading from the South facade to the garden. The metal cupola dome was designed by Luigi Poletti, and included a telescope. Man of the salons acquired the Neoclassical stucco decoration.

In 1874 the villa was bought by the family of Ulderico Levi (1842-1922), who was a prominent Jewish businessman and philanthropist of Reggio Emilia. Under the guidance of his family, some of the Liberty style decorations were added in the late 19th century. Ulderico's grand-daughter, Margherita Levi (1865-1938), was married to the opera composer Alberto Franchetti. Presently some rooms contain stuffed animals, derived from the 19th-century hunting trophy collection of Baron Raimondo Franchetti, Margherita's son. The villa was sold to the Pelosi family in 1956, who then sold it to the University of Bologna in 1971. While they still own the Villa, they no longer utilize the buildings for teaching.
