= Phonocar =

- Company type: Share-holding
- Industry: Hi-fi car entertainment
- Founded: 1972
- Headquarters: Reggio Emilia, Italy
- Products: Car hi-fi products & accessories audio-video equipment security systems.
- Website: www.phonocar.it

Phonocar is an Italian Company, founded in Reggio Emilia, Italy, in 1972. Phonocar started with the production of wooden car-radio consoles and gradually specialized in car hi-fi speakers, amplifiers, audio-video equipment, security systems and related accessories. Phonocar products are distributed under her trademarks Phonocar, Sec, Mlife and Galileo.

== History ==
At the time Phonocar started with the production of car hi-fi products, the idea of having good in-car quality music had not yet grown popular in Italy. As time went by, Phonocar’s initial accessories enterprise started extending over new fields, i.e. the design and production of car speakers and amplifiers which were bound to become part of the Italian and even European milestones of technological innovations.

In 1972, Phonocar manufactured the first wooden car-radio console, complete with speaker and accessories. In 1976, Phonocar created her first car hi-fi Speakers; in 1978, her first car amplifier, the well-known Power Box. In 1981, Phonocar introduced a radical change in the car hi-fi concept, by creating the wooden rear panels allowing for the installation of large speakers for the car rear. In 1983, Phonocar came with a series of micro-tweeter of reduced installation dimensions.

In 1989, it was the turn of a special Amplifier with an integrated ventilation fan providing for constant temperature conditions. Two years later, Phonocar created two completely new products, i.e. an active electronic crossover and an 8-channel amplifier with electronic crossover, both with setting possibility from the driver’s seat. The Phonocar-exclusive fixation system, for newly developed tweeters, fitting uneven installation surfaces and offering the orientation possibility towards the listeners, date back to 2001. In 2004, Phonocar introduced its speaker series PRO-TECH equipped with a new glass-fibre HCF-membrane (High-Compression-Fibre) ensuring low distortion and vast Band-pass figures. In 2007, Phonocar developed the amplifier series OTTO, offering the possibility of realizing unlimited multi-amplification projects without electronic crossovers. Contemporarily came the PHV016, Phonocar’s Tension elevator and stabilizer capable of doubling the amplifier power while the car engine is shut down.

== Products ==
- Amplifiers for cars and boats
- Woofer
- Subwoofer
- Midrange
- Tweeter
- Adapters for Speakers and Amplifiers
- Audio/Video Interfaces
- CD players
- DVD players
- Hard disks
- LCD Screens / Thin Film Transistors
- Audio crossover
- Carpets
- Resins for handicrafts
- Neon
- Parking sensors
- Bluetooth

== Models ==
=== The OTTO Series ===
The Series “OTTO” amplifiers have an integrated X.O.T electronic crossover system allowing the realization of High-end multi-amplification systems, with no need of additional external electronic crossovers. As a matter of fact, under the X.O.T. concept, the finals are serially combined and the setting of the frequency cut is effected for every single section, directly on the related amplifiers. Every OTTO amplifier comes with two terminals protecting the connections and links.

	RMS-power at 4 OHM	RMS-power at 2 OHM	RMS-power bridge-connection
PH8200	1.000	1.300
PH8124	120x4	200x4	400x2
PH845	40x4 + 150x1	70x4 + 170x1	90x2 + 150x1
PH8220	220x2	325x2	650x2
PH8140	130x2	215x2	430x2
PH880	75x2	115x2	230

HIFI magazine test results reported that “ Phonocar’s amplifiers series OTTO are equipped with an X.O.T.-exit –crossover capable of forming complex multi-amplification chains. The mechanical construction is very accurate, with lateral protection-covers for cables and connectors. Remarkable performances reaching up to 1,000 Watt RMS”. RMS”

=== Dream PH2000 ===
This Amplifier features the possibility of setting the Intensity and Frequency cuts directly from the driver’s seat. It is composed of 8 different channels. Two channel-couples of high power and high current capacity, facing the modern configurations with subwoofer, one or two door woofers and another two channel-couples of lower power capacity, facing the midranges and tweeters. Each of these four amplifier-couples can be governed also individually at full range. The PH2000 can be connected to all kinds of electronic crossovers, with the remarkable difference that with the Phonocar crossover PH9000 it will be possible to set the hi-fi installation from the driver’s seat. The “Dream” has been the Winner of the ECAP 2001/2002 prize (European Car Audio Press).

	RMS-power at 4 OHM	RMS-power at 2 OHM	RMS-power bridge-connection
SUB-W	150X2	250X2	500
WOOFER	150X2	250X2	500
MID-RANGE	50X2	80X2	150
TWEETER	50X2	80X2	150

=== PHV16 ===
The PHV16 is a voltage booster/stabilizer for installation between the car battery and the amplifiers. This way, the PHV16 will increase the power performance of the amplifiers by up to 100% while the car engine is shut down. This power increase will reach the 35% mark, while the car is moving. The components are soldered on a double-sided PCB, with a diffused ground basis. The main power-supply filter is constituted of 12 electrolytics of 2,200 microfarad/25 V, similar to the 105° computer-grade. There is a TL-494 providing for the switching frequency necessary for the four transformers with double E-core. The power section shows a row of 16 semi-conductors in TO-220P and 8 Mosfets in TO-3P packages. The inductive/capacitive section is formed by: 16 electrolytics Elna of 1,000 mF/25V/105°, 2 toroidal inductors and another 8 electrolytics of 4,700 mF/25 V. The Italian Caraudio magazine wrote about the PHV-16: “we are in front of a revolutionary product, lacking similar counterparts at the moment…..The laboratory-tests calculated an extraordinarily good performance of nearly 95%. In other terms, the PHV-16 produces a very limited amount of heat….. A special bit of information for the SPL-fans: supported by a 100 A/h-battery, the PHV-16 is in a position to maintain, at shut-down car-engine, the maximum exit-Tension for a period of 210 seconds”.

== See also ==
- List of companies of Italy
