= Palazzo Cassoli =

Historical building located in the centre of Reggio Emilia, Italy

Coordinates: 44.69922°N 10.63428°E

Palazzo Cassoli is a historical building located in the centre of Reggio Emilia, central Italy.

In the 16th century, the building belonged to the Boccacci family, who sold it in 1607 to count Girolamo Cassoli. At the end of the 17th century the façade was redone with a weave of leaves made of lime and pozzolana; the windows and the portal were adapted too.

Unfortunately, the restoration conducted after Cassa Nazionale Infortuni bought the building in 1924, changed the original look of the facade due to the reconstruction of parts that had degraded over centuries.

The inside was decorated in the 20th century by Anselmo Govi and there are remains of tempera paintings of Domenico Pellizzi.
