= San Stefano, Reggio Emilia =

Church building in Reggio Emilia, Italy

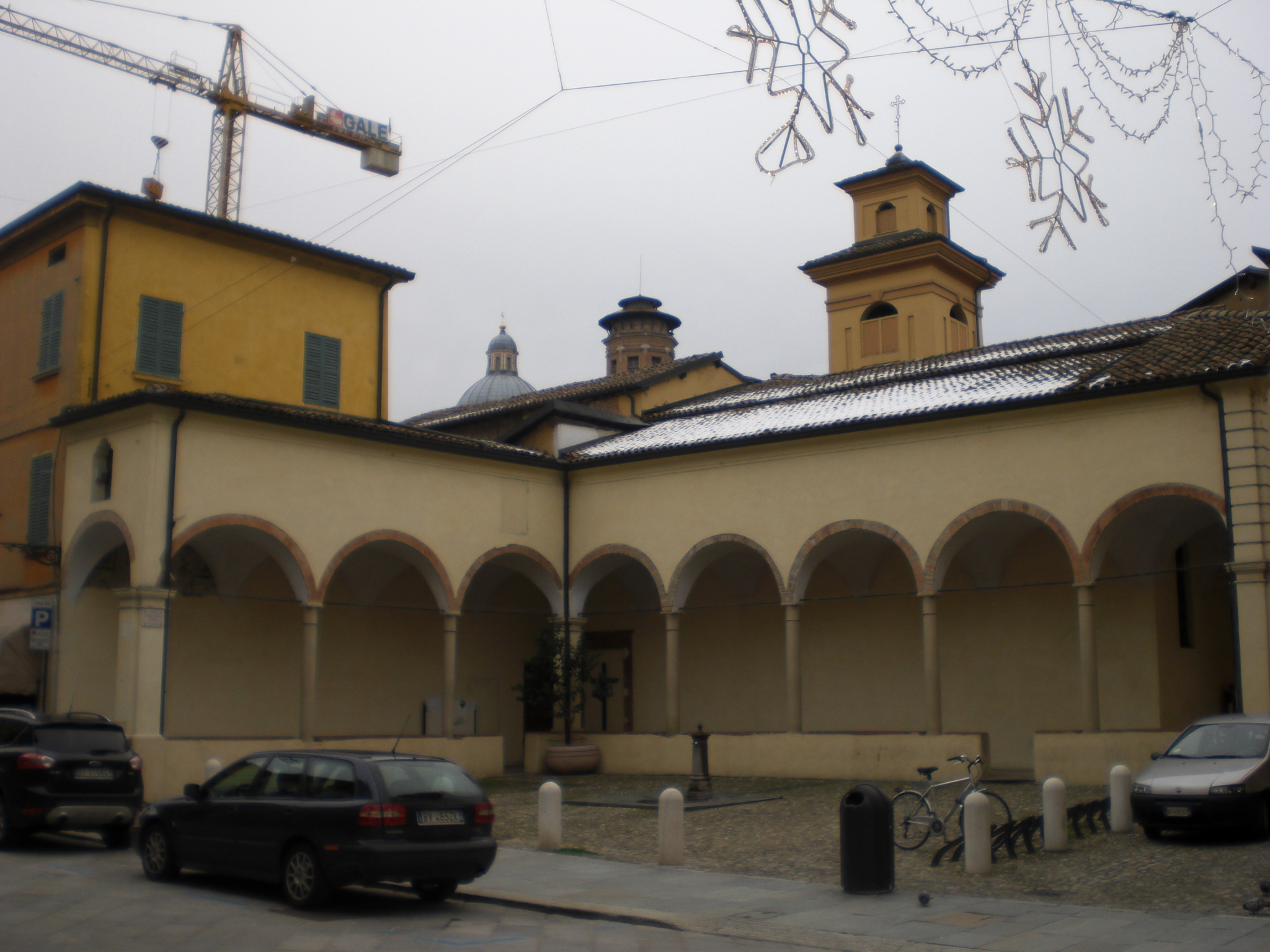

San Stefano is an ancient Romanesque Roman Catholic church in central Reggio Emilia, Italy. It is located on Via Emilia Santo Stefano number 30.

Parts of the cloister may be older than the 12th century, when the church was established at the site of a previous chapel. After 1312, ownership of the church passed from the Knights Templars to the Knights of Malta. In 1611, it was linked to the former Templars hospital. It belonged to the Knights of Malta until 1796. Franciscan and Carmelitan orders were also associated with the church. The interiors contains a number of medieval stone friezes and capitals.
