= Synagogue of Reggio Emilia =

Synagogue in Reggio Emilia, Italy

Sinagoga di Reggio Emilia
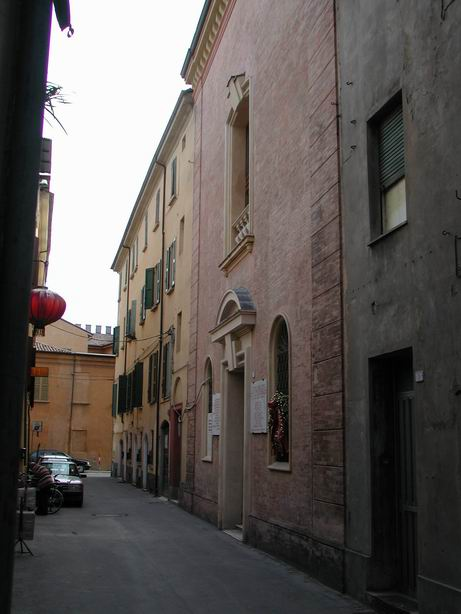
- Facade of Reggio Emilia Synagogue

Religion
- Affiliation: not in use

Location
- Location: Reggio Emilia, Emilia Romagna, Italy
- Interactive map of Sinagoga di Reggio Emilia
- Coordinates: 44.69994°N 10.62849°E

Architecture
- Architect: Pietro Marchelli
- Style: Neoclassical architecture
- Groundbreaking: 1856
- Dome: 3

The Synagogue of Reggio Emilia or the Sinagoga di Reggio Emilia is located on the Via dell'Aquila of Reggio Emilia, in the region of Emilia Romagna, in Italy. living in the Grand Duchy of Tuscany in 1848.

== History ==
A synagogue was located at the site since 1672; the Jewish community had been confined to a ghetto in this area. While the papacy through the bull Cum nimis absurdum called for establishment of a ghetto in 1555, only during the regency (1658 – 1662) of Duchess Laura Martinozzi, Duke Alfonso IV d'Este's widow, was this rule was enforced in Reggio. From there on, Jews had to live within the boundaries of the streets San Rocco, Caggiati, della Volta, dell'Aquila, and Monzermone. This synagogue was rebuilt to replace the prior building; it was designed by Pietro Marchelli in 1849 and completed by 1856. The Napoleonic government abolished the laws restricting Jews to living inside the Ghetto.

The Jewish community of Reggio itself was decimated by the Italian Fascist government, the second world war, and the Holocaust. By 1938, when the Italian government promulgated the first Italian racial laws, only 65 Jews remained in Reggio, and about one hundred in the whole province. About 10 Jews in Reggio were caught and sent to Auschwitz in 1944: Oreste Sinigallia, Benedetto Melli, Lina Jacchia, Olga, Bice and Ada Corinaldi, Beatrice Ravà, Ilma Rietti, Iole Rietti. Many escaped to rural homesteads.

The synagogue was heavily damaged by allied bombings of World War II. The furniture and the beautiful carved marble Torah ark were transferred to the synagogue Kirit Shmu ‘el in Haifa. The building, for a time used as a printing house, became dilapidated. In 2008, a partial restoration of the interior took place, and the building is used for cultural exhibits.
