= Palazzo Fontanelli Sacrati, Reggio Emilia =

Coordinates: 44.69690°N 10.63553°E

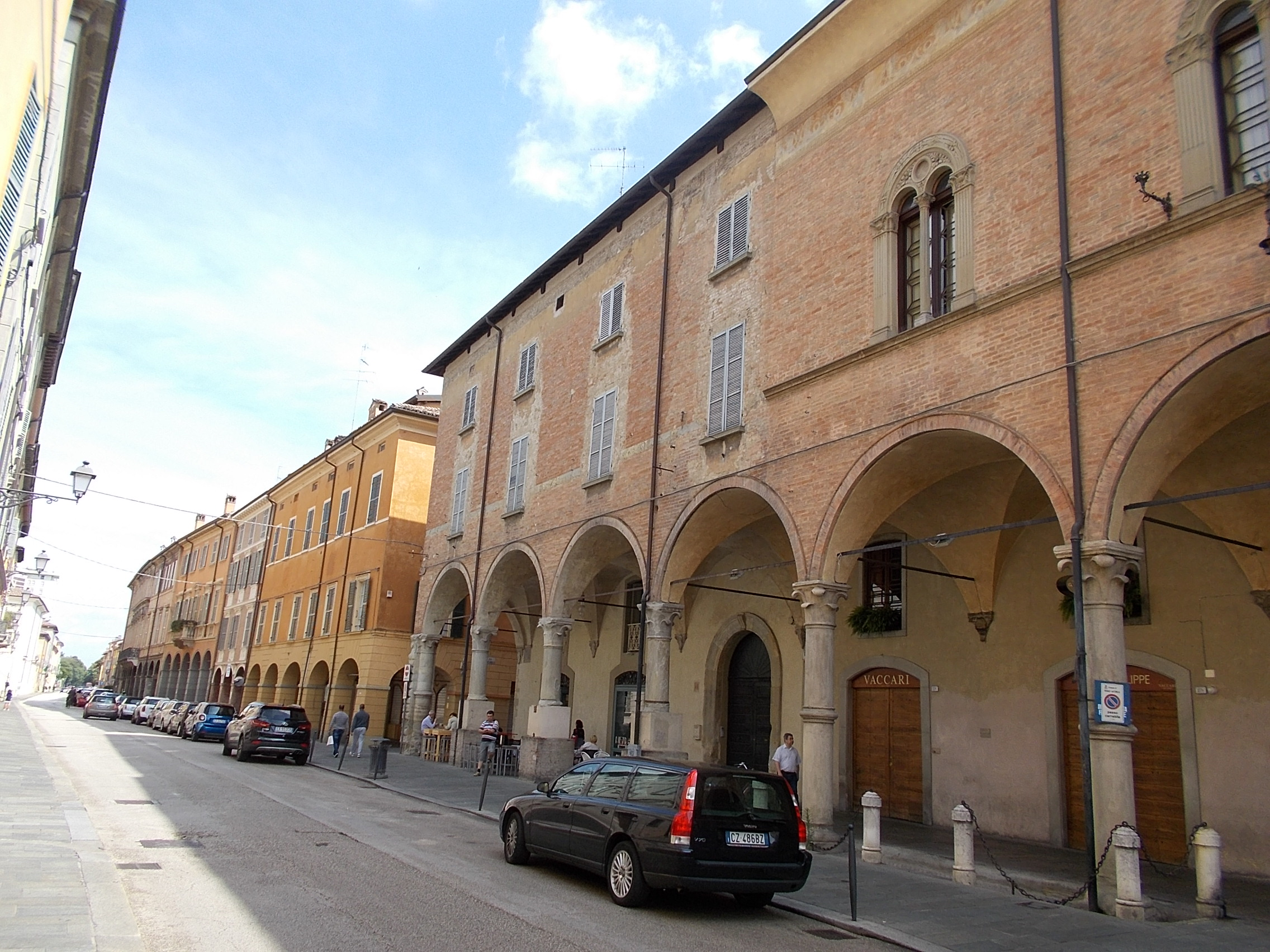
Facade of palace

The Palazzo Fontanelli Sacrati, also known as the Palazzo Terrachini or Terracini or just Sacrati, is a Gothic and Renaissance-style palace with a main facade located on Via Emilia San Pietro #27 in the historic center of the town of Reggio Emilia, region of Emilia Romagna, in Italy. It is now used for private and cultural events.

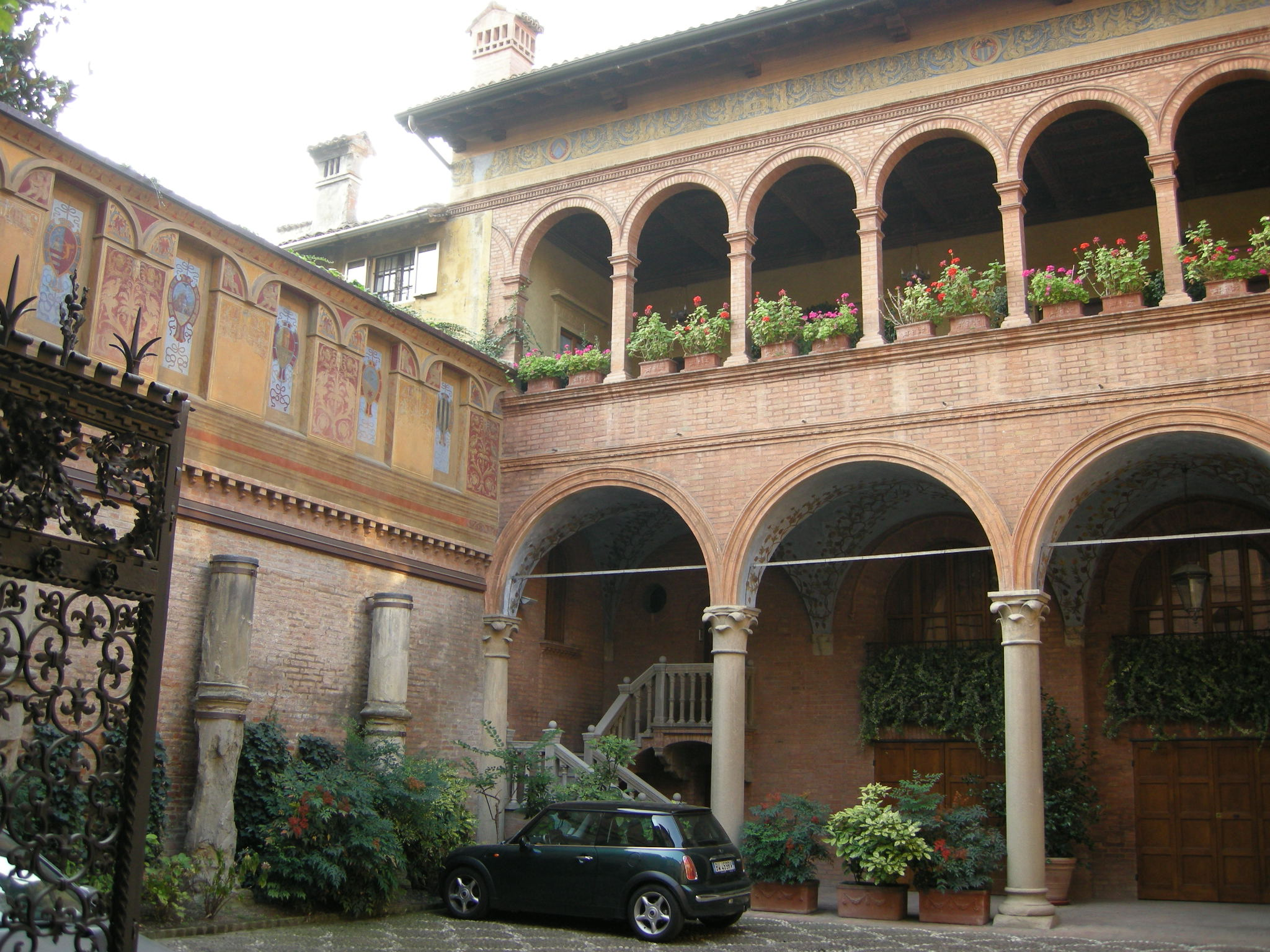
Internal courtyard, along left wall are the original columns replaced from the facade in 1916

A palace at the site was initially commissioned in 1492 by the Fontanelli family, modifying a set of buildings at the site into a joined structure with a uniform facade. The foliated portico columns with gothic spandrels and the second story mullioned windows differ from the more classical, decorated portal, with motifs recalling Ancient Roman celebrations of triumphal arms. A refurbishment in 1928-1929 aimed to restore the original elements to the facade and courtyards. The main courtyard has an original well structure. The ceiling of the main staircase was frescoed with an allegory of Aurora and her carriage in the 19th century.
