= Pietro Marchelli =

Italian architect (1806–1874)

Pietro Marchelli (9 March 1806 – 29 October 1874) was an Italian architect active mainly around Reggio-Emilia.

== Biography ==
Pietro was born in Reggio Emilia in 1806. His father, Domenico was also an architect. He initially studied mathematics at the University of Modena, graduating in 1830. He dedicated himself to being an engineer and architect in his native Reggio, where his father and uncle had been court architects. Among his major works are the refurbishment of the Palazzo Ducale, The design of the Foro Boario, and the design of the Synagogue of Reggio Emilia. He became a professor of architecture at the School of Fine Arts of Reggio. He was made Cavaliere dell'Ordine del Cristo from Portugal.

== Works ==
- Palazzo del Capitano del Popolo (1829 restoration)
- San Domenico (1833-1835 restoration)
- Porta Castello (1836 restoration)
- Ex-convent of Santa Caterina (1837 restoration)
- Palazzo dell'Intendenza di Finanza (1839)
- Palazzo Carmi (1839)
- Palazzo della Dogana (1839 restoration)
- Portico Teatro Ariosto (1839)
- Palazzo Guicciardi (1840-1850 restoration)
- Ricovero di Mendicità (1841 restoration)
- Sistemazione dell'isolato Guasco (1842)
- Palazzo Corbelli (1844, facade)
- Palazzo Ducale (1839-1845 restoration)
- Foro Boario (1845-1852)
- San Francesco 1856-1857 restoration)
- Synagogue of Reggio Emilia (1857-1858)
- Palazzo dei Canonici (restoration)
- Palazzo Rangone (restoration)
- Palazzo Spalletti-Trivelli (restoration)

== Sources ==
- Manzini, Enrico (1878). Degani (ed.). Memorie storiche dei reggiani più illustri: nelle scienze nelle lettere e nelle arti. Reggio nell'Emilia.
- Pirondini, Massimo (1982). Bizzocchi (ed.). Reggio Emilia: Guida storico-artistica. Reggio nell'Emilia.
- Comastri Martinelli, Mirella (2009). Gianni Bizzocchi Editore (ed.). Reggio Narrata-L'Ottocento. Reggio nell'Emilia.
- derived from Italian Wikipedia
