= Monument to the Concordi, Reggio Emilia =

Italian landmark

Monument to the Concordi
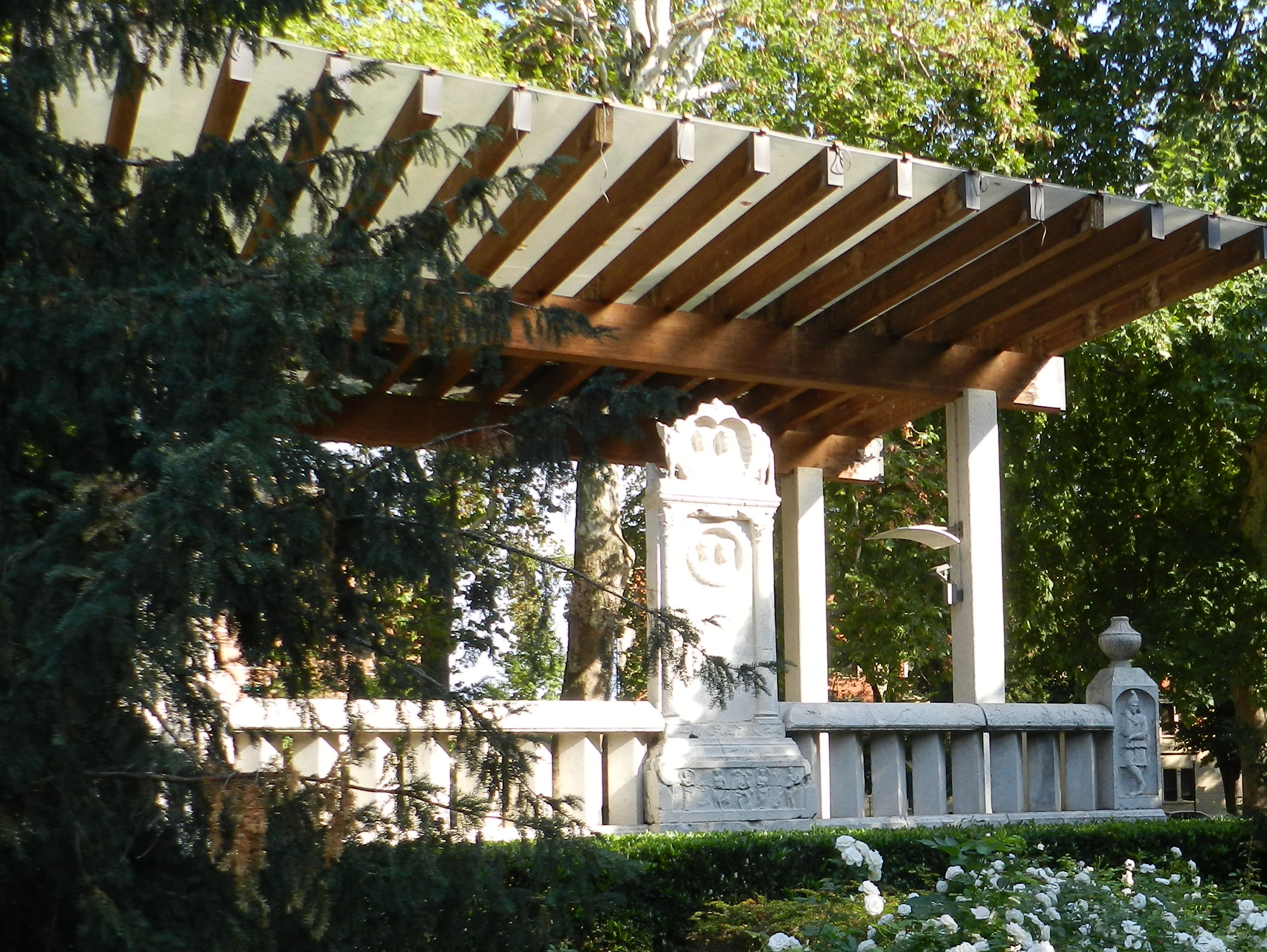
- Tomb of Priscilla
- Interactive map of Monument to the Concordi
- 44.70246°N 10.63157°E

The Monument to the Concordi Family is a monumental tomb likely erected presumably in the third quarter of the first century at a necropolis near the present town of Brescello near the ancient Roman town of Brixellum. Discovered in 1929, it was re-erected a year later in the Public Garden in central Reggio Emilia, Italy.

== Description ==
Fortuitously discovered during the excavation of a canal, the monument consists of a rectangular marble enclosure with steles dedicated to members of the Gens Concordia. The reconstruction in the town of Reggio was limited to the front of the enclosure, and placing the marble stelae and balustrade on a rough brick plinth. Other burials found near the site were dedicated to prominent local family, including the Gens Vibia.

In the center of the front balustrade is the commemorative stele, topped with the portraits of the deceased, framed by shells and flanked by two semi-columns with helical grooves crowned by Corinthian capitals. These support an entablature to which bronze garlands were once suspended as a festoon, of which only the holes for fastening remain. At the corners of the balustrade there are small pillars decorated with a relief of a mournful Attis, wearing a Phrygian cap and an inverted torch, and surmounted by a stone urn. The four Seasons are depicted in relief at the base of the central stele.

The stelae indicates the freed slavewoman Munatia Rufilla dedicates the funeral monument to Caius Concordius Primus, Caius Concordius Rhenus and her daughter Concordia Festa. The two Concordi, both freedmen, had held the office of sevirate, that is serving the emperor.
