= Palazzo da Mosto, Reggio Emilia =

Coordinates: 44.69905°N 10.63583°E

The Palazzo da Mosto is a Renaissance-style palace located at Via Giovanni Battista Mari 7 in the northwest of the historic center of the town of Reggio Emilia, Italy.

The palace was commissioned in 1488 by Francesco da Mosto, the town’s massaro or bailiff, who worked under the Duke of Este, from the architect Biagio Rossetti. In the second half of the 19th century, the property was acquired by Pietro Manodori, a wealthy banker, who established a school for young children and infants there. The property served as a school until 1991. In 2005, the palace was restored under the direction of the Fondazione Manodori, a charitable organization associated with the Cassa di Risparmio di Reggio Emilia. Today, it functions as an exhibition hall and a venue for cultural events. Noteworthy architectural features include a frieze of tondos with busts below the roofline and a Baroque staircase leading to the piano nobile.
