= Paolo Guidotti =

Italian painter (1559–1629)

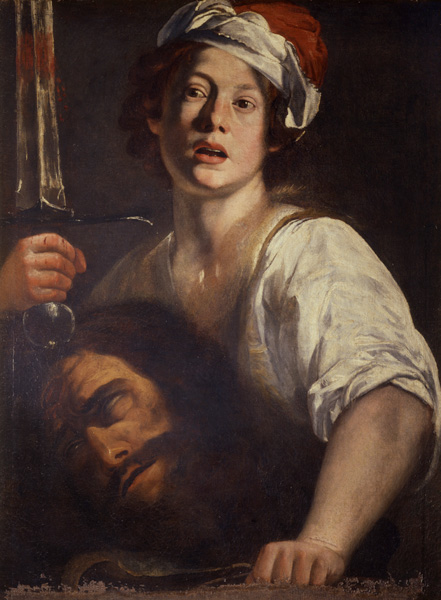
David with Goliath's head

Cavaliere Paolo Guidotti, also known as il Cavalier Borghese (1559–1629) was an Italian painter, sculptor and architect. He was active in Rome, Lucca, Pisa, Reggio Emilia and Naples.

== Biography ==
He was born in 1559 in Lucca. He was described as having a ingegno bizzarro, brave or whimsical depending on your interpretation, since he claimed to have designed a flying machine, or parachute, but succeeded only in breaking a leg.

Many of his architectural works, completed for Pope Sixtus V have been lost. He completed a series of sculptures for Pope Paul V, who allowed him to adopt the surname Borghese, and made him conservator of the Campidoglio and leader (principe) of the Accademia San Luca. His paintings and frescoes enriched many churches in Rome and Naples. In 1610, after obtaining many appreciations for his innovative works in Palazzo Giustiniani at Bassano Romano, he went back to Lucca. Here he influenced with his works the younger local painters, such as Pietro Paolini, Paolo Biancucci and others. In this period he was also in Reggio Emilia where he frescoed the apse of San Giovanni Evangelista with a Resurrection. In 1618 he returned to Rome, where he stayed till his death (1629). His last work, in St. Peter's Basilica (1628) is now lost.

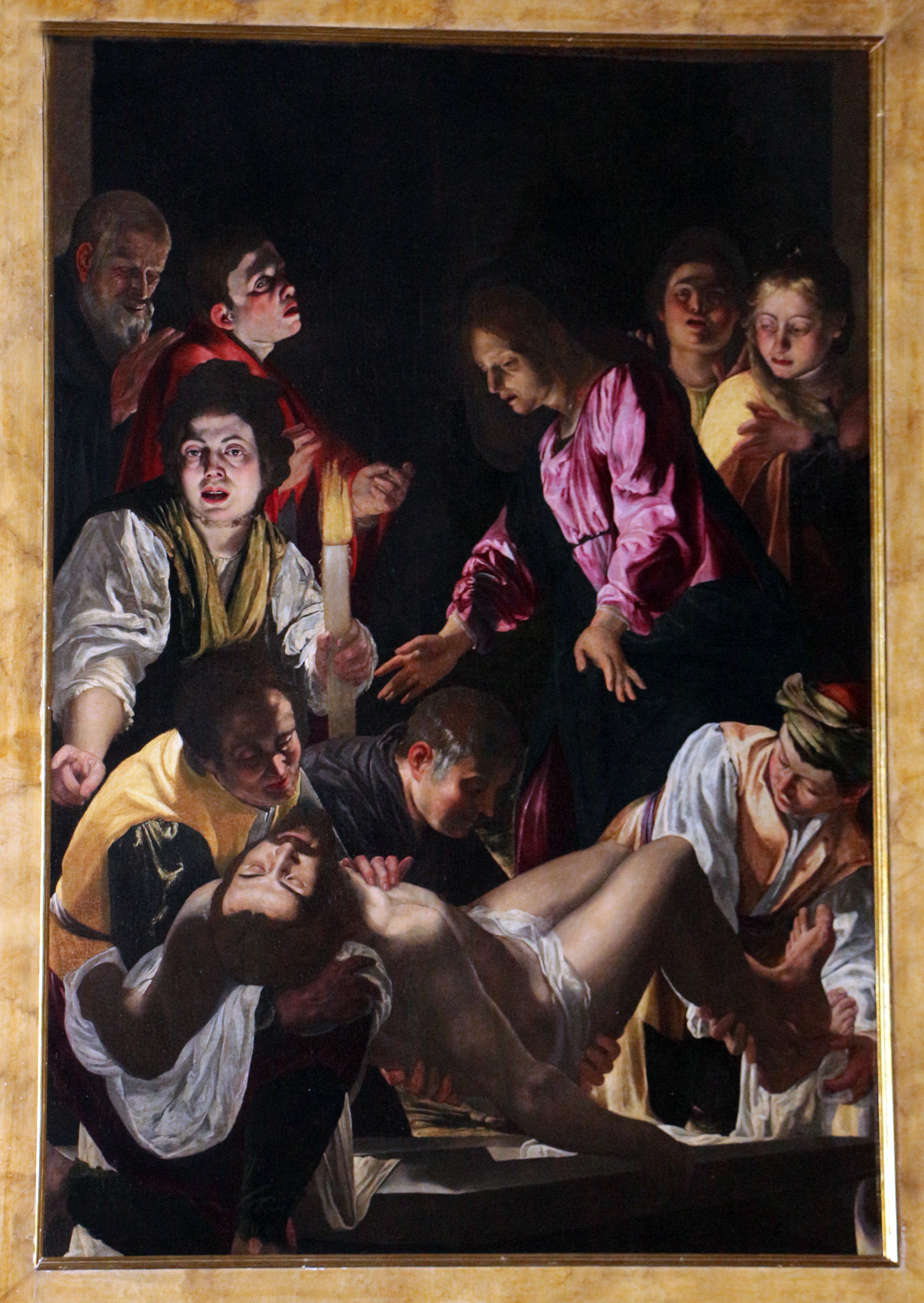
Descent from the Cross, 1608–1610

Somewhat of a polymath, he made the preparations for the ornamentation surrounding the canonization in 1622 of Isidore the Laborer, Ignatius of Loyola, Francis Xavier, Filippo Neri, and Saint Teresa of Ávila. He wrote an epic poem titled Gerusalemme Distrutta, concluding each eighth line with the same words of Gerusalemme liberata. He is said to have traveled to cemeteries at night to examine cadavers for drawing.

His flying apparatus was contrived with whalebone and down feathers, and the episode is described as thus:

But his most extraordinary whim was that of flying. He contrived wings of whalebone in the most ingenious manner, which he covered with down, and giving them sufficient folds by means of springs, joined them under his arms; and having made a number of trials in private, determined at length to make a public exhibition. He ascended from one of the eminencies of Lucca, and was carried for about a quarter of a mile; but his wings not being able to support him any longer, he fell through a roof into a chamber, and broke his thigh. Giambatista Dante, of Perugia, had also the same whim, and the same fate. Oliver of Malmesbury, an English Benedictine, and good mechanic, in 1060, Bacville, a Jesuit of Padua, a Theatine of Paris, and a number of others, have all been thus desirous of soaring into the regions of air, and have all been equally successful. This, however, cannot be properly termed flying, but only an easier and slower method of falling. A flight can only be applied to the feat of the Padre Andrea Grimaldi of Civitavecchia, who returned from the East Indies with a wonderful machine of his own invention, in the form of an eagle; seated across which he was borne from Calais to London, 1751, making seven leagues an hour, directing his flight either higher or lower, as he pleased. This fact is most seriously recorded in the "Modern History." It is possible that posterity may consider this invention much to our honour.

Francesco Milizia goes on to conclude that had Guidotti not attached himself to so many things, he might have been a good artist...he was, it may be supposed, singular in his thoughts and reasoning.

It is said a contemporary, Giovanni Battista Danti, attempted a similar stunt circa 1488 in Perugia.
