= Palazzo Busetti =

Coordinates: 44.69867°N 10.63113°E

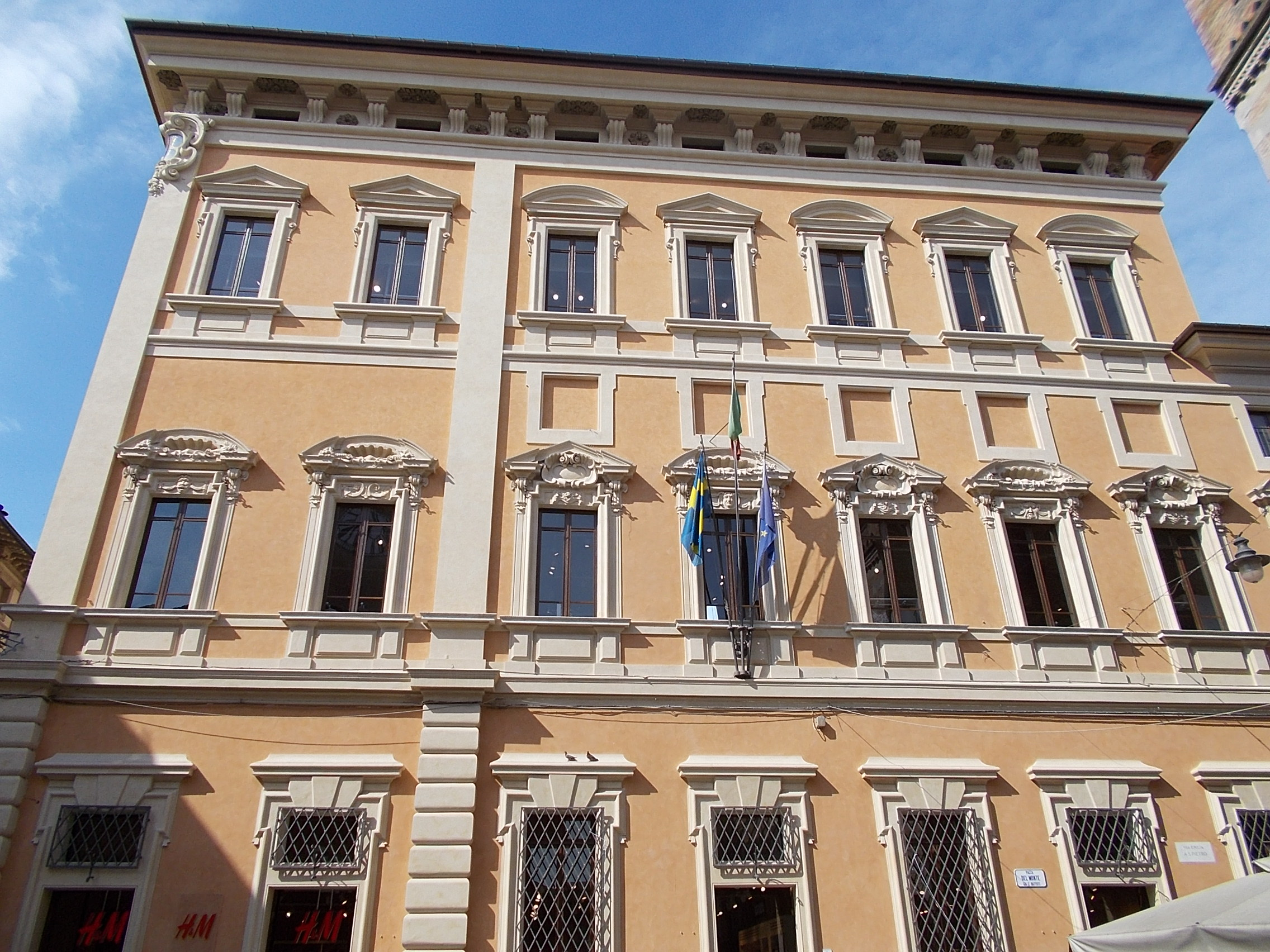
Palazzo Busetti

The Palazzo Busetti or Bussetti, is a Baroque-style palace with a main facade located on Piazza del Monte 6, but structures connected with the palace are flanked by the via Francesco Crispi and Don Giuseppe Andreoli, in the historic center of the town of Reggio Emilia in Italy. The main palace facade faces the side of the Palazzo del Capitano del Popolo and the Palazzo del Monte di Pieta.

The original palace was begun in 1657 by Count Ferdinando Busetti, who had gained a fortune in the commerce of silk. Construction continued until 1574, but by 1699, the Busetti family, lacking heirs, the property under guidance of an endowment was put to various uses. In 1699, it was occupied by the Bishop's Seminary, and soon by the Jesuit college. A small theater and church were added. From 1752 to 1783, the building housed offices and classrooms for the University of Reggio Emilia, before again housing the Jesuits. In 1921, after much refurbishment, the palace was subdivided into various businesses, including a celebrated Ristorante-caffè Busetti, the offices for the newspaper L’Italia Centrale, and offices of the Banca Commerciale Italiana. In 1939–1950, the theater and convent were rebuilt for alternate uses. The portico was placed at an alternative facade. The buildings now house boutique stores, offices, and apartments.
