= Palazzo dei Musei, Reggio Emilia =

Coordinates: 44°42′01″N 10°37′55″E

The Palazzo dei Musei is the civic museum located in front of Piazza Martiri del 7 Luglio, facing the Valli Municipal Theatre, in central Reggio Emilia. The collection is diverse and includes works of art, archeology, history, and natural history.

== History ==
The buildings prior housed the church of San Luca and an adjacent palace, but were granted in 1256 to the Franciscan order by the then bishop Guglielmo Fogliani. The structures were converted into a monastery. During the Napoleonic occupation, the monastery was suppressed and the building became both barracks and stable.

The building also housed various schools. It was designated to display civic collections in 1830, beginning with the natural history and travel collections of Lazzaro Spallanzani, purchased by the Municipality in 1799. In 1862 the Don Gaetano Chierici began displaying another collection of local minerals, fossils, and archeologic findings.

The Marbles Gallery, established and open to the public in 1875, displaying stone mosaics, sculptures, and architectural fragments dating from Roman era to the 19th century. In addition to the Spallanzani collection there are zoologic (Antonio Vallisneri room), anatomic (Paolo Assalini room), botanical and ethnographic (Giambattista Venturi room) collections. Among the displays is the fossils of the Valentina whale (2001), a 3.5 million-year-old fossil cetacean found on the hills, were added to the 19th-century collections from the Secchia Valley.

The Antonio Fontanesi Gallery contains artworks from the 14th to the 20th century. It contains artworks collected by the Bank of Bipop-Carire. The museum has paintings and works by Antonio Ligabue, Fausto Melotti; Claudio Parmiggiani, and Marco Gerra. In 2005, the building was refurbished and restored by Italo Rota.

== Gallery ==
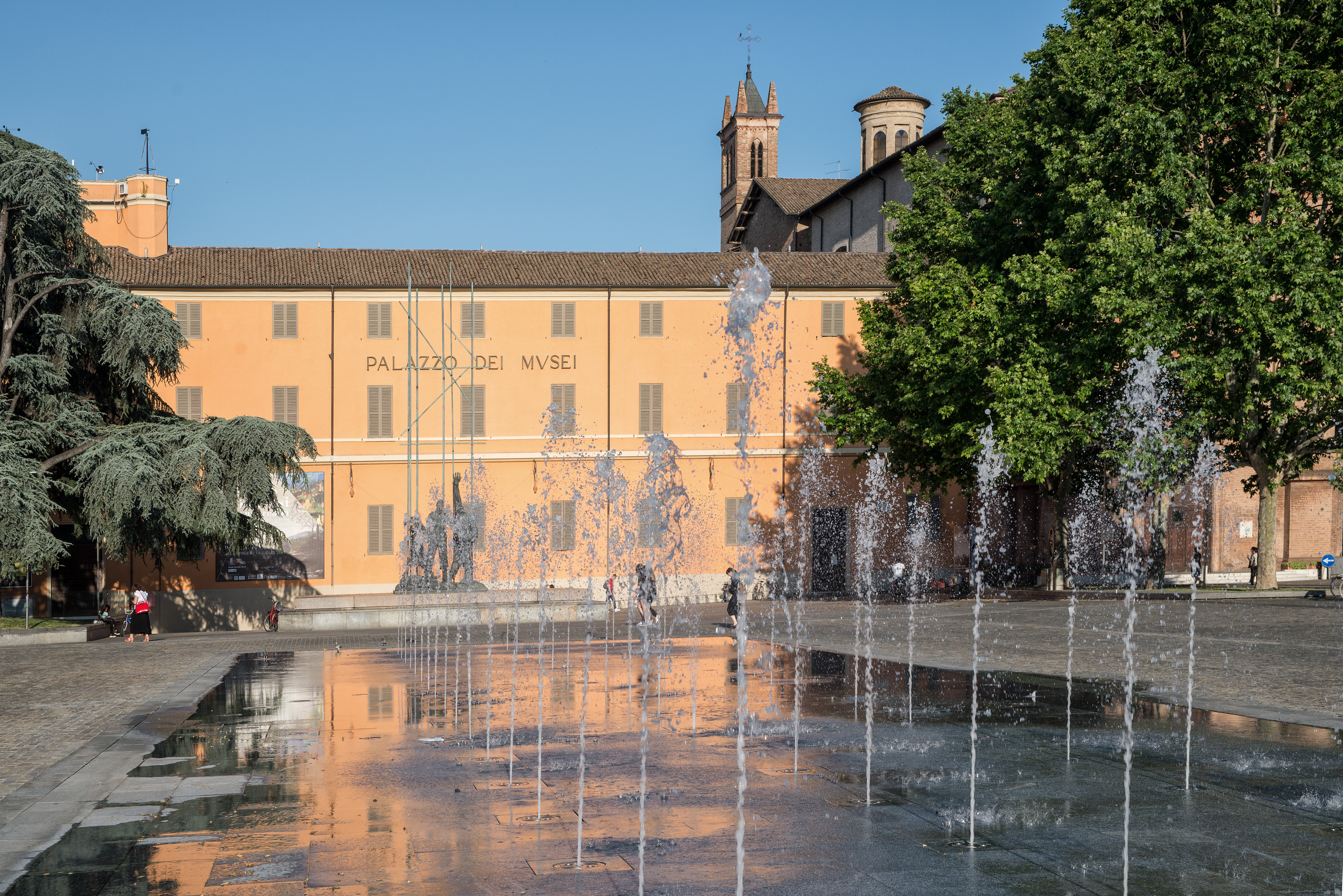
Facade and Piazza

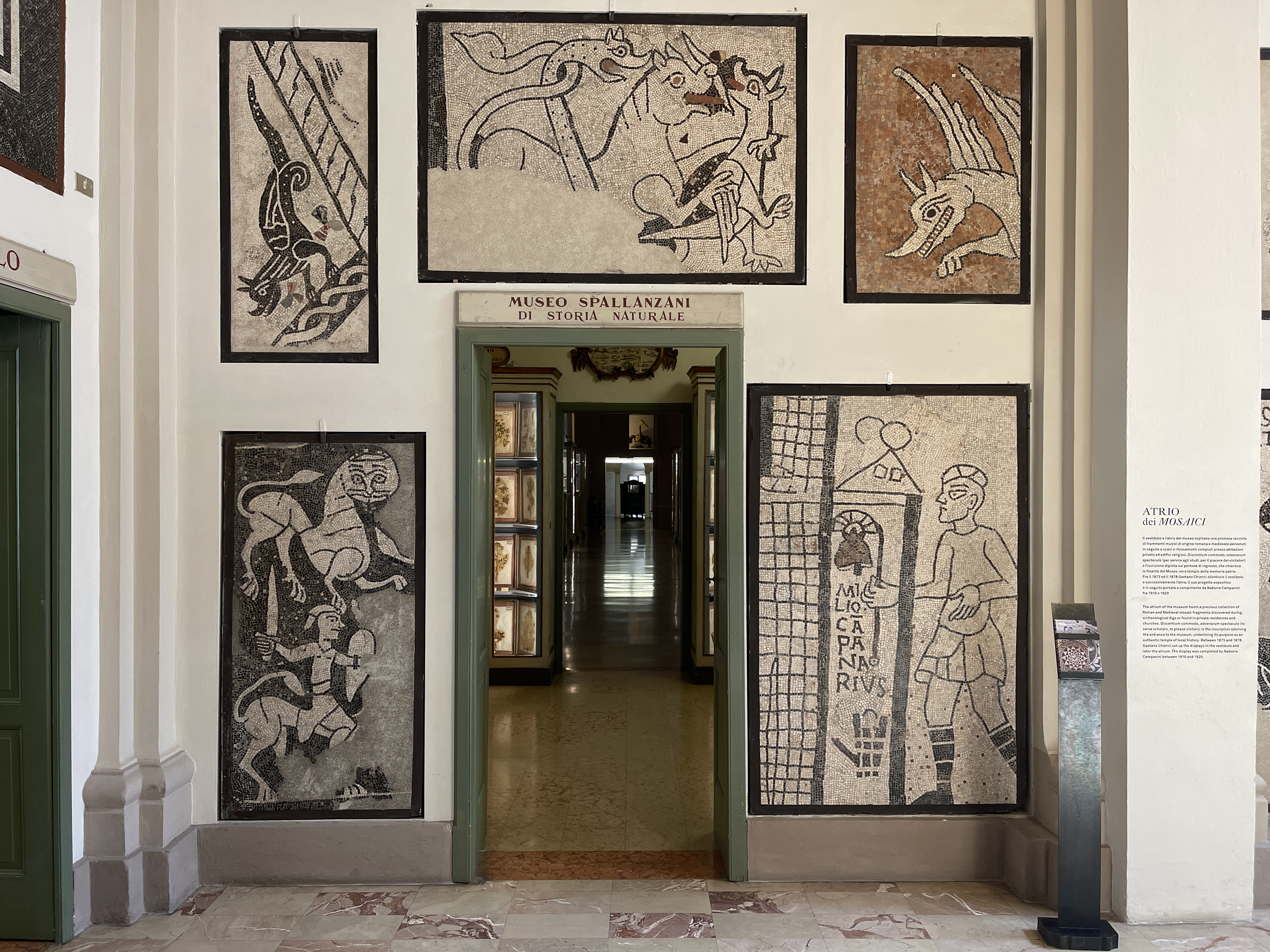
Atrium with Roman mosaics, entrance to Spallanzani collections

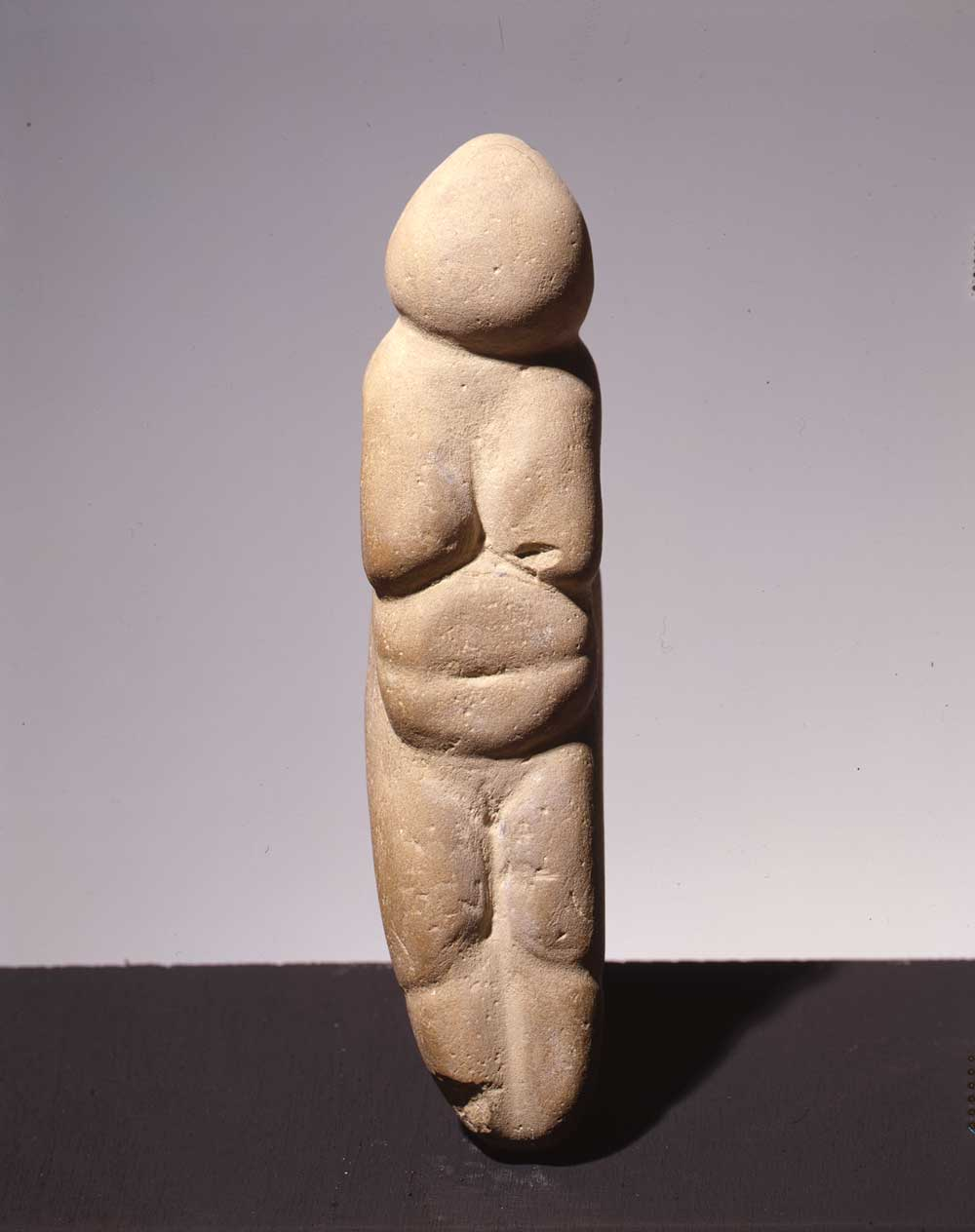
Venus of Chiozza

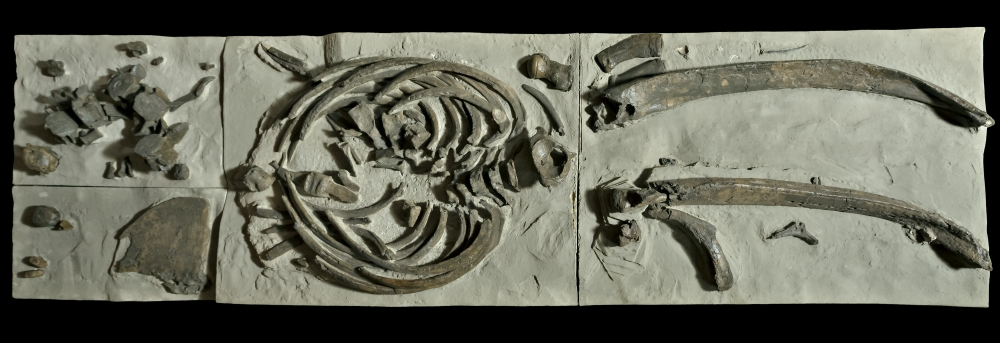
Balena Valentina

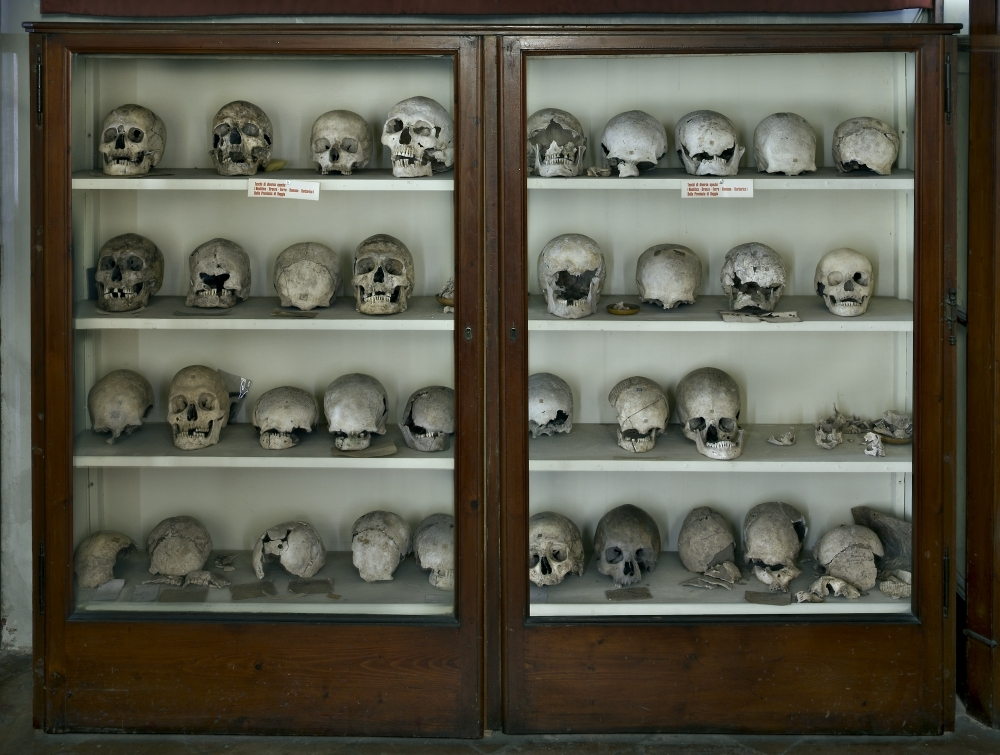
Paleontology collection of human skulls
