= Palazzo Cassoli – Tirelli =

Coordinates: 44°41′46″N 10°38′04″E

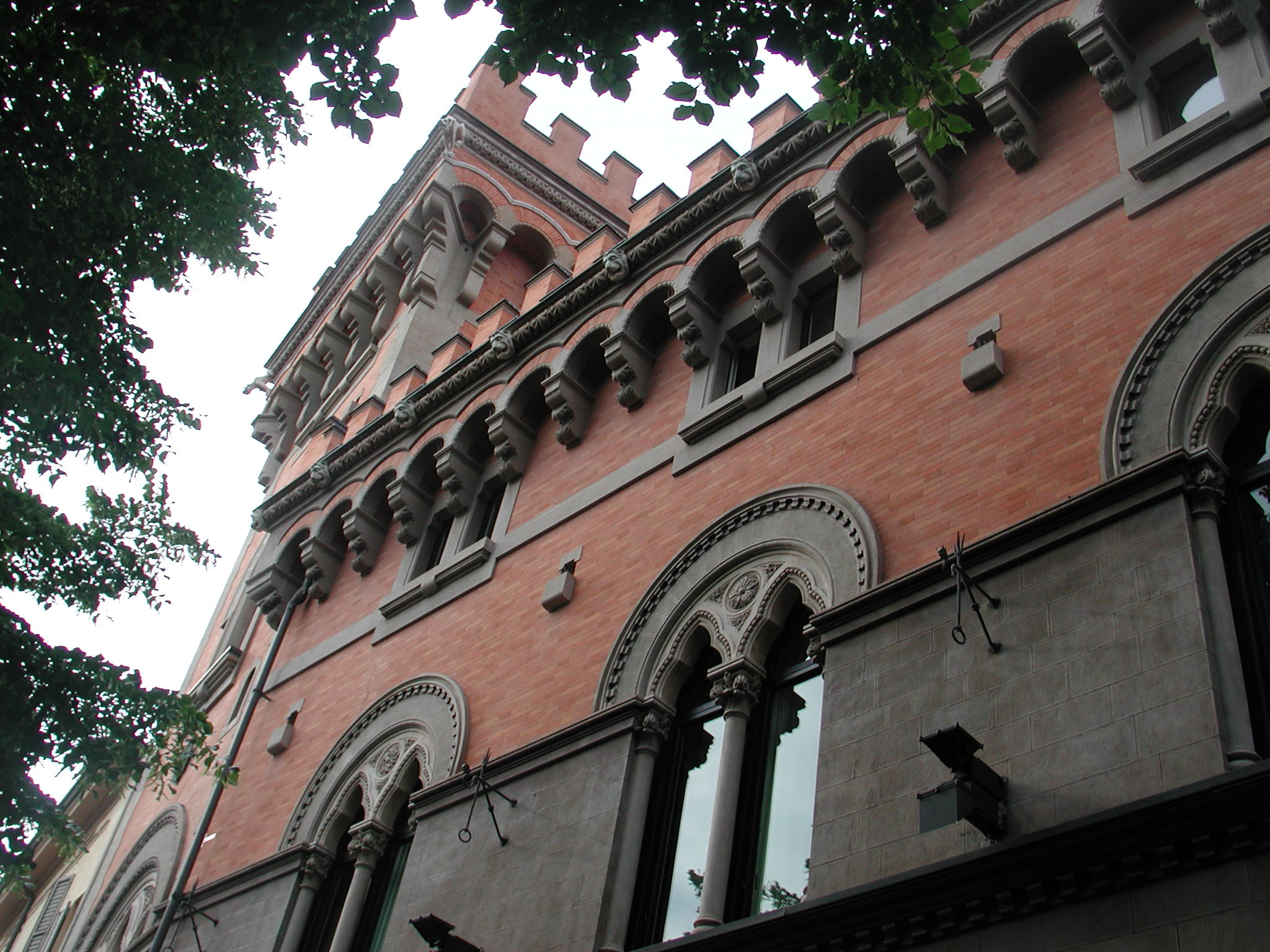
Facade of Palazzo Cassoli - Tirelli

Palazzo Cassoli – Tirelli is a building located at Via Toschi, 32, in the historic centre of Reggio Emilia, Italy.

It was built in 1915 as the city residence for count Giuseppe Cassoli and his wife countess Barbara Tirelli. The project of the building was made by Luigi Caldini from Florence, in the new eclectic Neo-Gothic-style with turrets and merlionated rooflines.

The family kept an important art collection in the building until they lived there.

The country residence of the counts was the "Il Più Bello" (the most beautiful) castle, located between the towns of Albinea and Puianello in the hills near Reggio.

At present the Association of the Industrialists of Reggio Emilia has its head office in the building.
