= Basilica della Ghiara =

Roman Catholic Basilica in Reggio Emilia, Italy

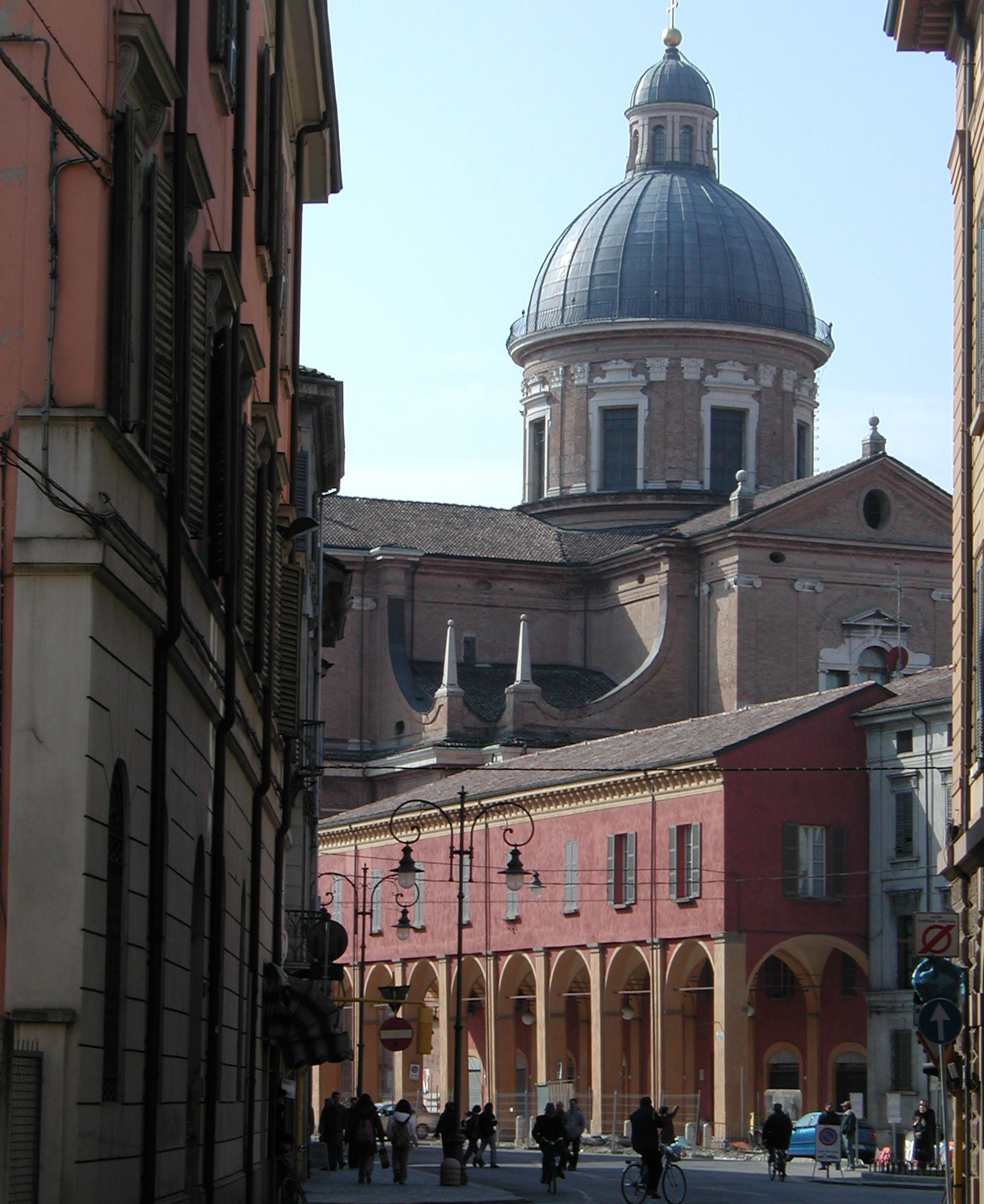
The Basilica of the Madonna della Ghiara

The Tempio della Beata Vergine della Ghiara (Temple of the Blessed Virgin of Ghiara), also known as Basilica della Madonna della Ghiara, is a church in Reggio Emilia, northern Italy. The building is the property of the comune (municipality) of the city.

== History ==
The church was built in response to an alleged miracle, occurring in 1596, associated with a local votive image of the Madonna which had been painted by Lelio Orsi. The image soon became a place of pilgrimage, and the offerings of the faithful led to the construction of a new temple into which the votive fresco was moved.

The cornerstone was laid on June 6, 1597 by the bishop Claudio Rangone, in the presence of Duke Alfonso II d'Este and Duchess Margherita Gonzaga. Part of the former convent and church were demolished in order to make way for the new structure. The plan was by the local architect and sculptor Francesco Pacchioni, who also designed the dome and the interior stuccoes. The church was consecrated on May 12, 1619.

== Overview ==
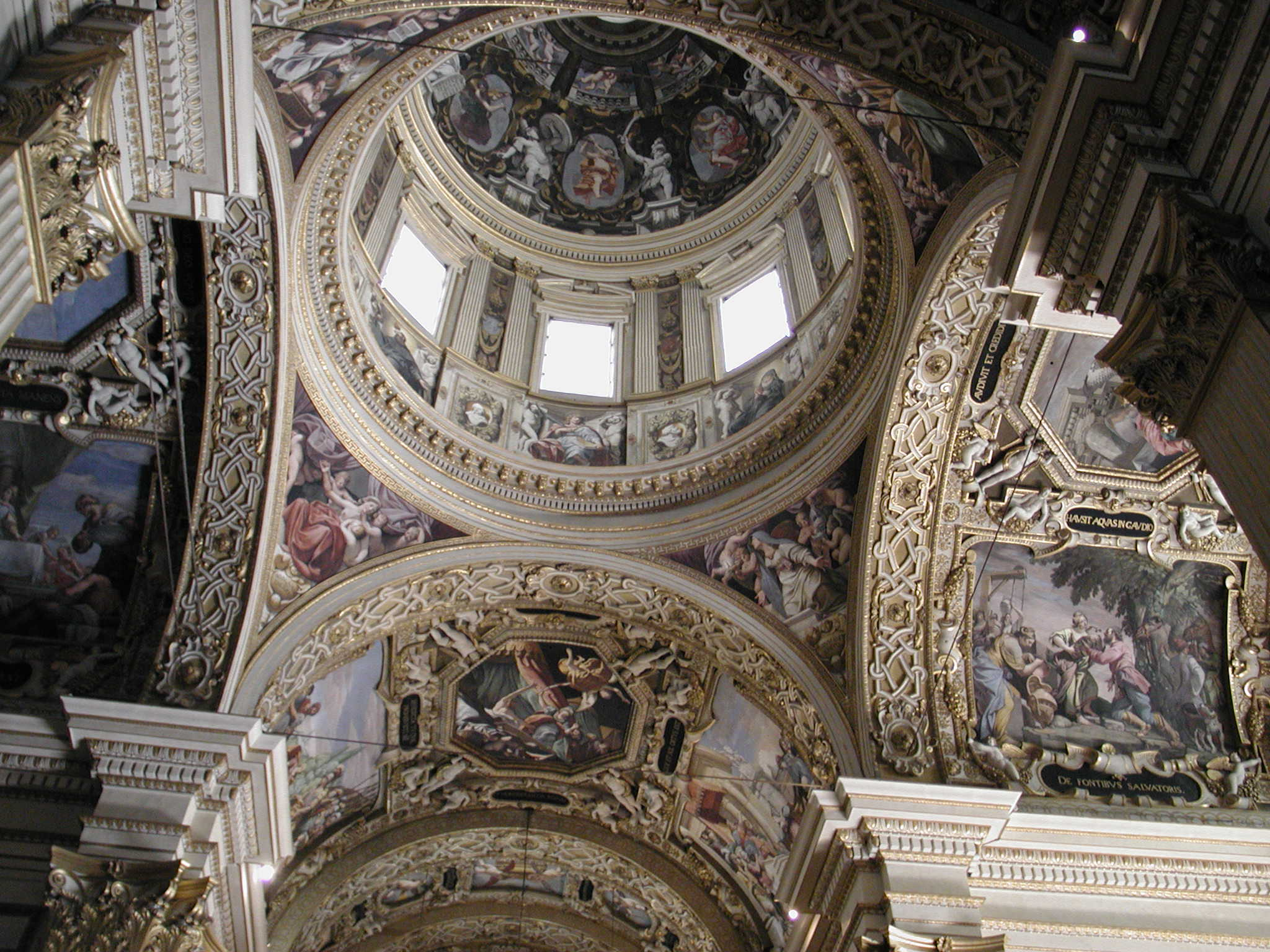
Interior of the dome

The plan of the church is on the Greek cross, with, at the centre, a dome surmounted by a lantern. Four smaller domes, not visible from outside, are at the inner angle of the cross.

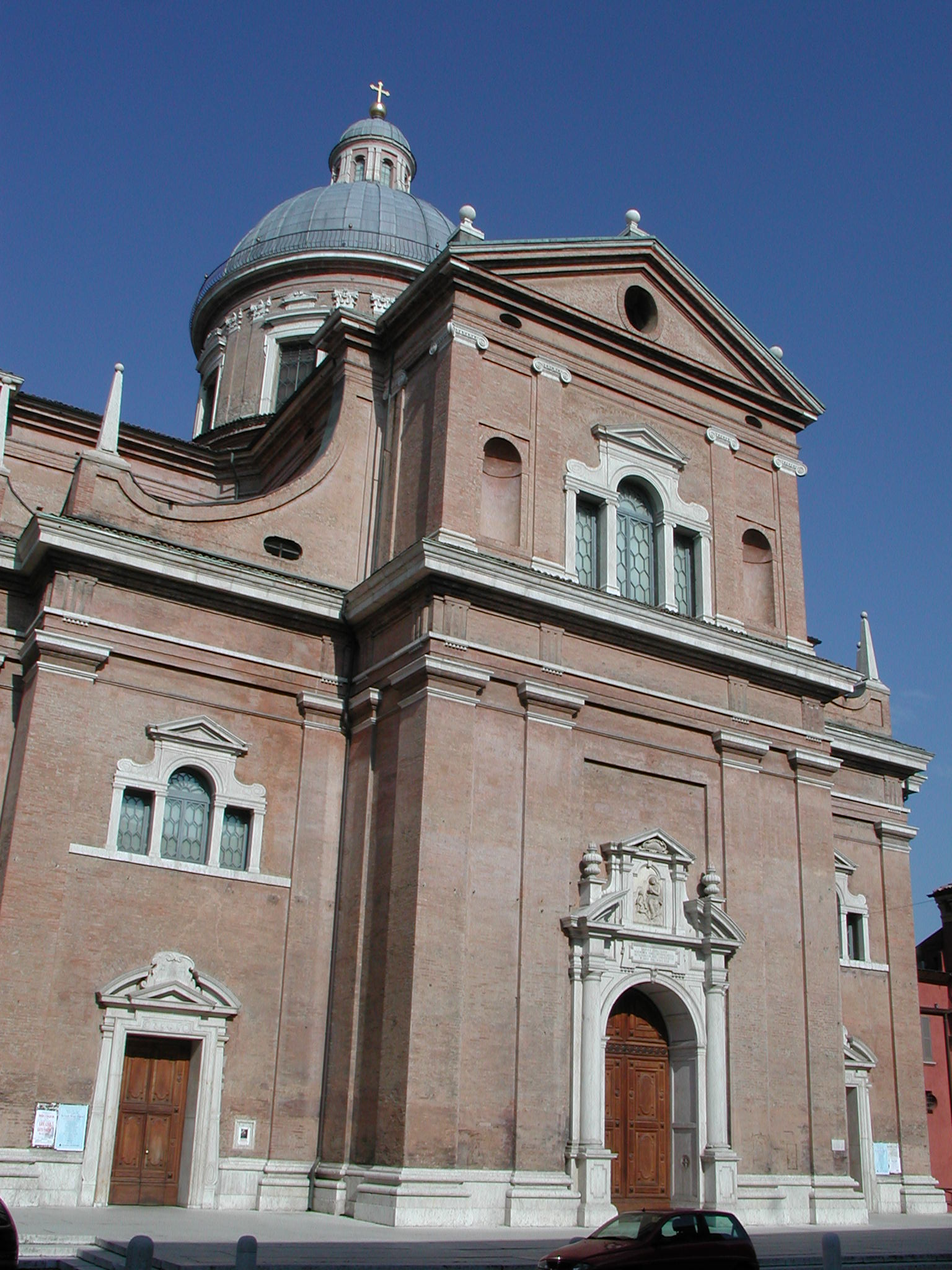
Façade of the basilica

The façade has Doric columns on the lower part and Ionic columns on the upper one. It is built of laterite, with white Veronese marble insets. The central portal has a marble bas-relief portraying the Vergine della Ghiara, (1642). The side portals were executed in 1631.

The interior is in Late Renaissance style, with rich decorations in gold, marbles, as well as large frescoes of the Carracci school covering the domes and the vaults. These depicts stories of women of the Old Testament. The ceiling painted by Alessandro Tiarini is considered his masterwork. The dome frescoes are by Lionello Spada (1616).

The church has a nearly central plan. The arm of the church constituting the entry has ceiling frescoes (1645–1646) depicting Gentleness (Mansuetudine), Faith, Adam and Eve evicted from Paradise, Abraham served by Angels, Rebecca and Eleazar by Luca Ferrari. The walls have canvases depicting the Miracle of Domenico Crotti by Pier Martire Armani and the Miracle of Domenico Carattieri by Pietro Desani.

The first chapel on the right has cupola frescoes (1629–1630) depicting the eight virtues, and saints showing devotion to God. In the spandrels, are depictions of Isaiah, Daniel, Ezechiel, and Jeremiah, by Camilo Gavasseti. The altar has a Madonna and child with St Francis by Alessandro Tiarini.

The nave to the right of the center has a ceilings (1615–1616) frescoed with Abigail feeds David, Judith and Holofernes, Ester and Assuerus by Lionello Spada. The walls have canvases (1615) depicting Two Miracles attributed to the Maddona della Ghiara, painted by Michele Mattei. The Altarpiece here depicts a Madonna by Giovanni Battista Magnani.

In the second chapel of the right is a canvas of Madonna of Loreto and Saints Jerome and John the Baptist attributed Sebastiano Vercellesi. The second altar an Annuciation by Tiarini and the ceiling was frescoed (1642) with the Evangelists and the eight Religious Orders by Pietro Desani.

The distal nave before the presbytery, the ceilings are frescoed with Deborah and Barak, Samuel offered by mother to priest, Abishag serves David, and David and Harp (1619); as well as St Michael defeats devil and Solomon in throne (1625–29), all works by Tiarini.

In the presbytery walls are paintings depicting a Resurrection of Laura di Correggio by Pietro Desani and a Miracle of Paolo Melli (1633) by Sebastiano Vercellessi. In the apse is a Coronation of the Virgin (1625–1629) by Tiarini.

The central cupola has frescoes depicting Alms, Faith, Hope, and Charity and the four patron saints of the city and four Servite Saints and eight persons of the Old Testament and the Apotheosis of the Madonna; all by Lionello Spada. The quadratura was completed by Tommaso Sandrini.

In the left nave the ceiling frescoes depict (1647–1648) Rachel at the Well, Gisele and Sisara and the Drowning of the Pharaoh's army, Purity and Virginity, all by Luca Ferrari. On the city altar, erected by the Commune and designed by Giovanni Battista Magnani is a canvas (1624–1625) depicting Christ on cross consoled by Angels by Guercino. On the walls are canvases (1648) depicting the Miracle of Agramante Milani by Giulio Cesare Mattei (Son of Matteo) and the Miracle of Nicolo Lagoner by Francesco Burani.

In the second chapel on left are altarpieces depicting San Filippo Benizzi (1673) by Orazio Talami and San Giorgio lead to Martyrdom with St Catherine by Ludovico Carracci. In the cupola are frescoed (1622) the Doctors of the Church and with Beatitudes and Spiritual Power by Carlo Bononi.

In the first chapel on the left are depicted (1619) the Four Sibyls, Four Virtues, and Angels carrying the Symbols of the Passion, by Tiarini.

== Sources ==
- Piccinini, Guglielmo (1921). Guida di Reggio Emilia.
