= Paolo Emilio Besenzi =

Italian painter

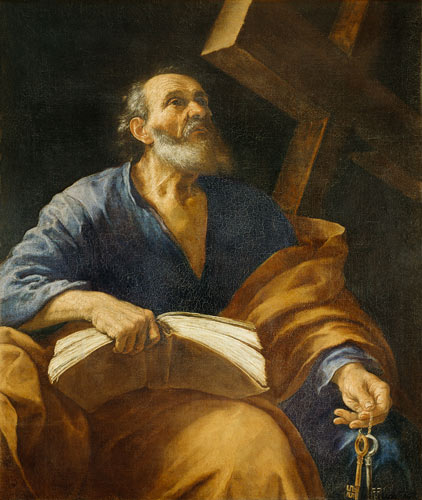
Saint Peter. 114 x 135 cm. Oil on canvas. Uffizi Gallery

Paolo Emilio Besenzi (1608–1656) was an Italian painter, sculptor, and architect of the 17th century, born and active in Reggio Emilia. He lived and worked as a painter, sculptor and architect in Reggio Emilia in the first half of the 17th century. According to Tiraboschi he was sent to France for a short time, at the court of Louis XIII, who would have named him a knight. He trained with Francesco Albani, and was a friend and companion of Lionello Spada. He was buried in the now demolished church of Santa Maria Maddalena, for which he designed the main altar.

== Works ==
Among the works by the artist were:

- a canvas depicting the Martyrdom of St Placido and St Flavia for the church of San Pietro, Reggio Emilia;
- a Mystic marriage of St Catherine of Alexandria;
- a canvas depicting St Simone, Saints Bernard and Catherine that once was atop the Altar of the Brusati at San Prospero.

In the Church of San Pietro, beyond the canvas of St Placido, are several sculptural works:

- a stucco image of Jesus Resurrected, in the vaulted ceiling of the main sacristy;
- the statues of Saints Peter and Prospero in the chancel;
- the stucco decoration for the altars of St Placido and St Giulia.

He made also twelve apostles and four evangelists for the Confraternity of San Domenico; the twelve apostles are lost. It is said that Besenzi helped design the reconstruction of the Church of Sant'Agostino.
