= San Pietro, Reggio Emilia =

Roman Catholic Church in Reggio Emilia, Italy

Coordinates: 44.6968°N 10.6376°E

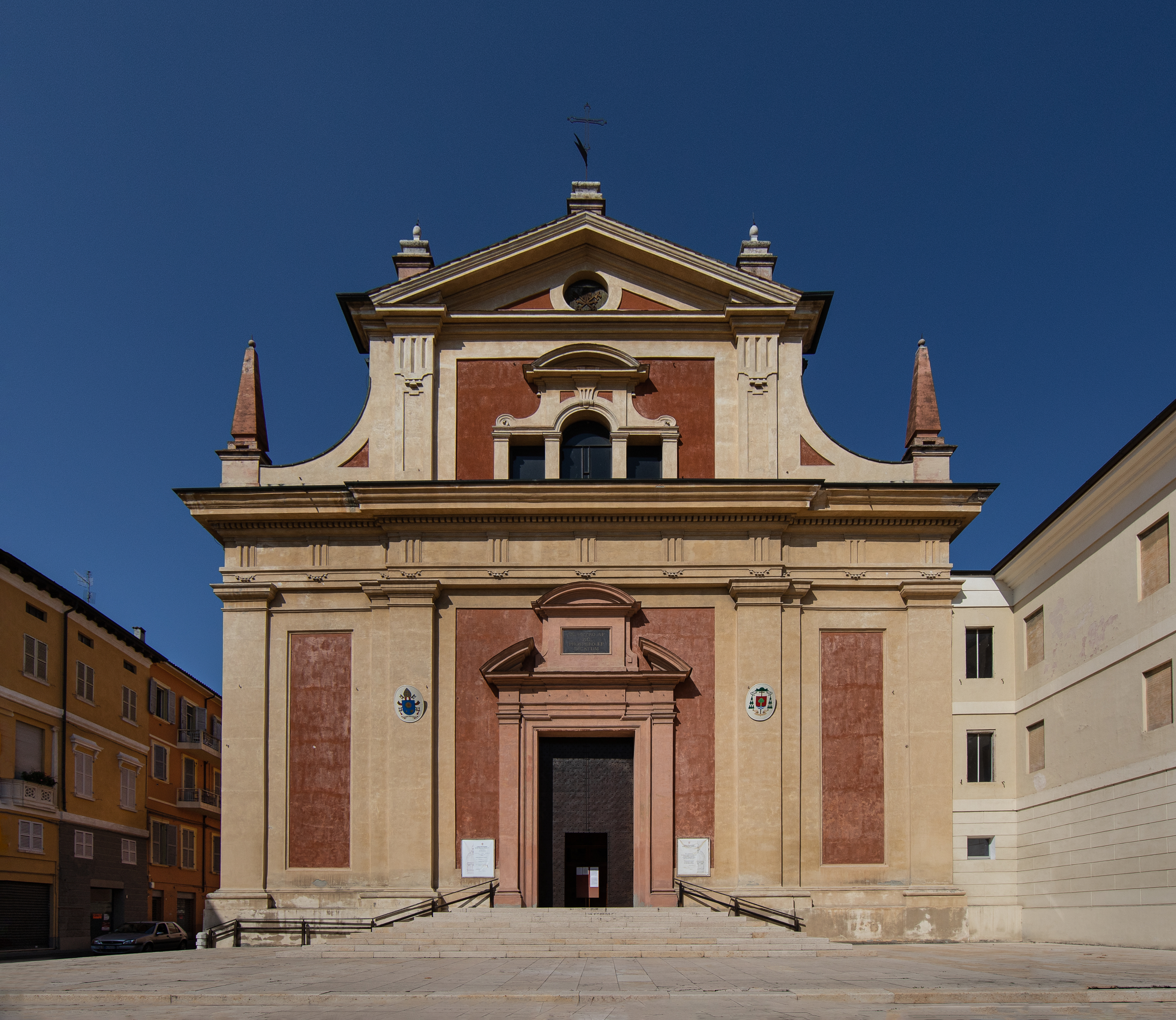
The façade

San Pietro ("Saint Peter") is a Baroque Roman Catholic church located at Via Campo Samarotto 1, with its façade facing Via Emilia San Pietro, in the southwestern part of central Reggio Emilia, Italy.

== History ==
A document from 1140 acknowledges a church-monastery dedicated to Saints Pietro and Prospero existing outside the city walls (extra muros), on the road to Modena. However, the fighting in the region had displaced the Benedictines from that monastery, and for their protection, in 1513 the bishop Albericone, under Pope Leo X, consecrated a new church and convent at this site.

The present church was built in the 17th century under designs of various architects initially led by Giulio della Torre from Bologna, while the cupola (1625–1629) was designed by Paolo Messori from Reggio. The church layout follows the rules given by the Council of Trent and is a remarkable example of an architecture still true to its original design. Only the façade was built in the 18th century. The interior has paintings by Alessandro Tiarini, Paolo Emilio Besenzi, Pietro Desani and Malossi.

== Cloisters ==
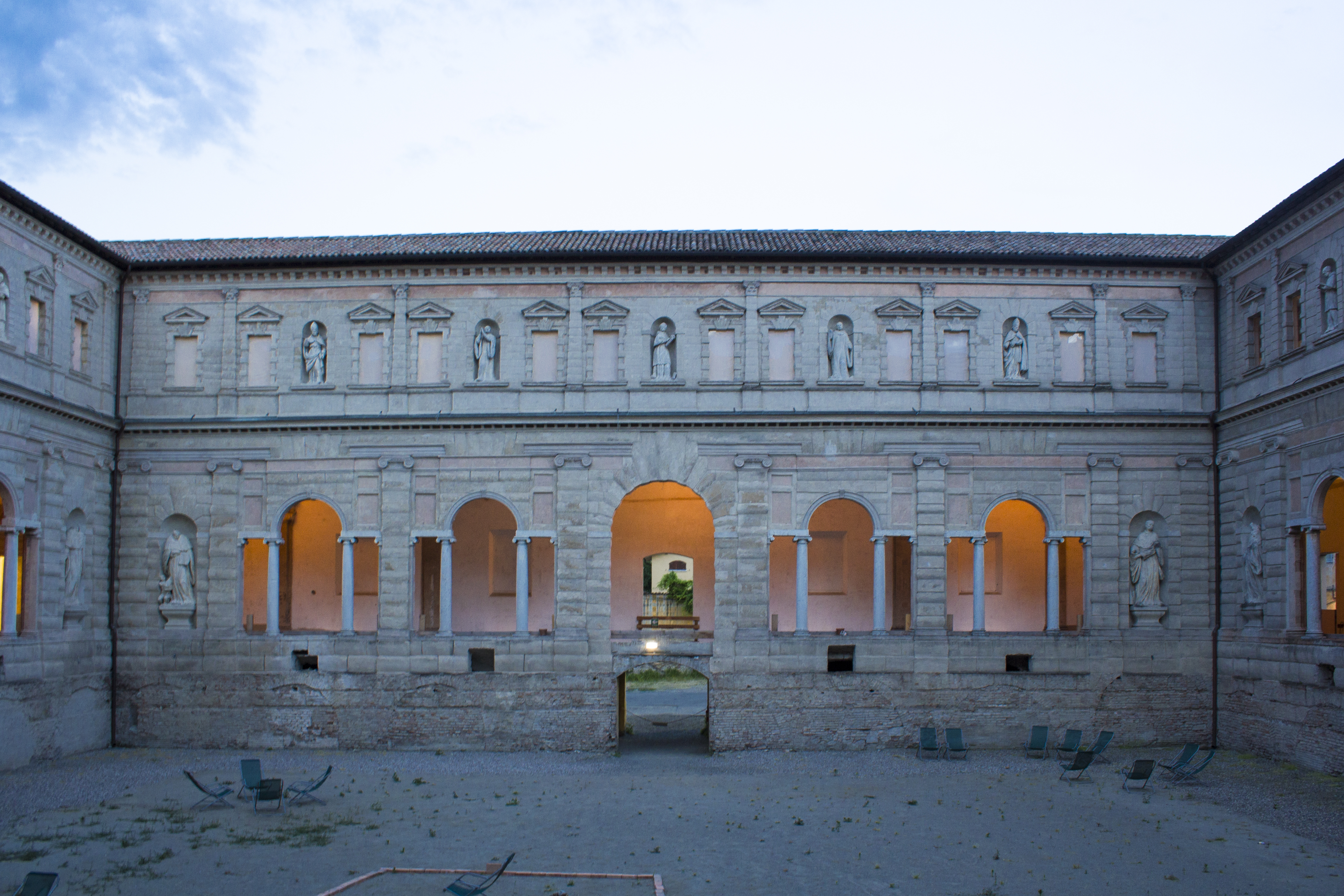
Greater cloister of San Pietro

The monastery is of great interest, thanks to its two cloisters. The smaller, built in 1524 under the designs of Bartolomeo Spani and Leonardo Pacchioni, is an example of the sober high Renaissance style, while the larger one, built sixty years later under Prospero and Francesco Pacchioni, is strongly reminiscent of the courtyard of the Palazzo Te in Mantua designed by Giulio Romano.

== Gallery ==
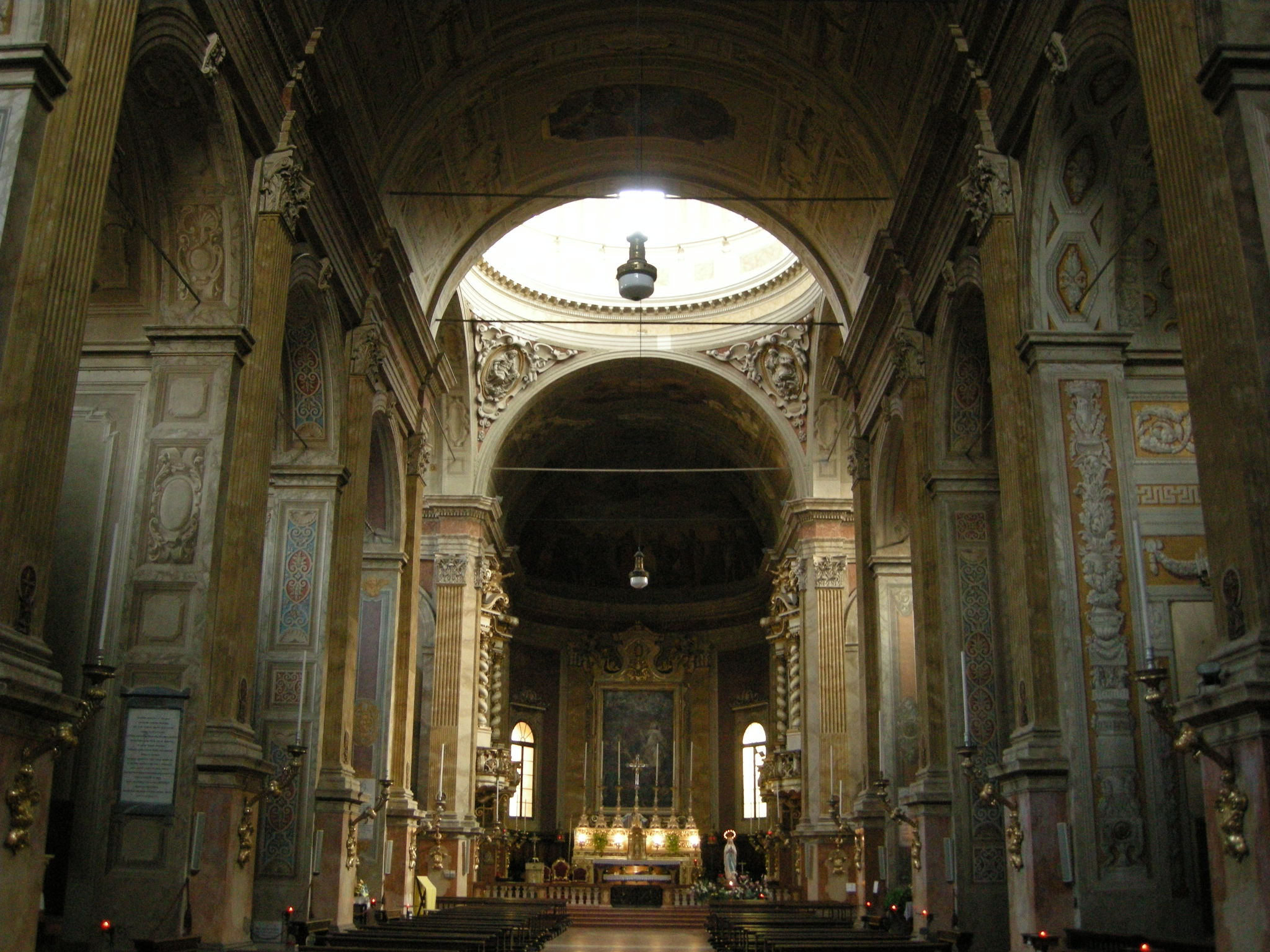
Interior nave of church

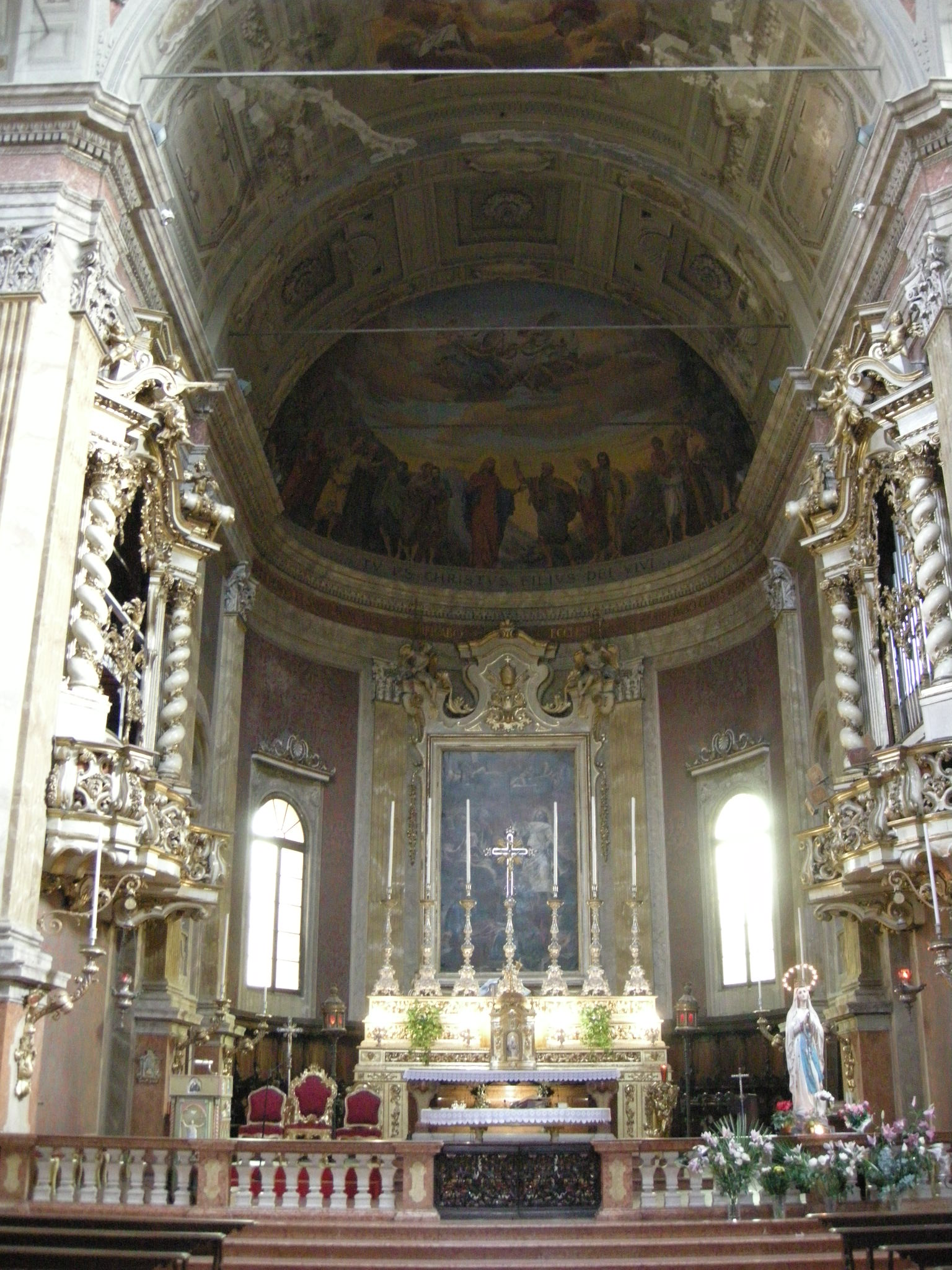
Main altar

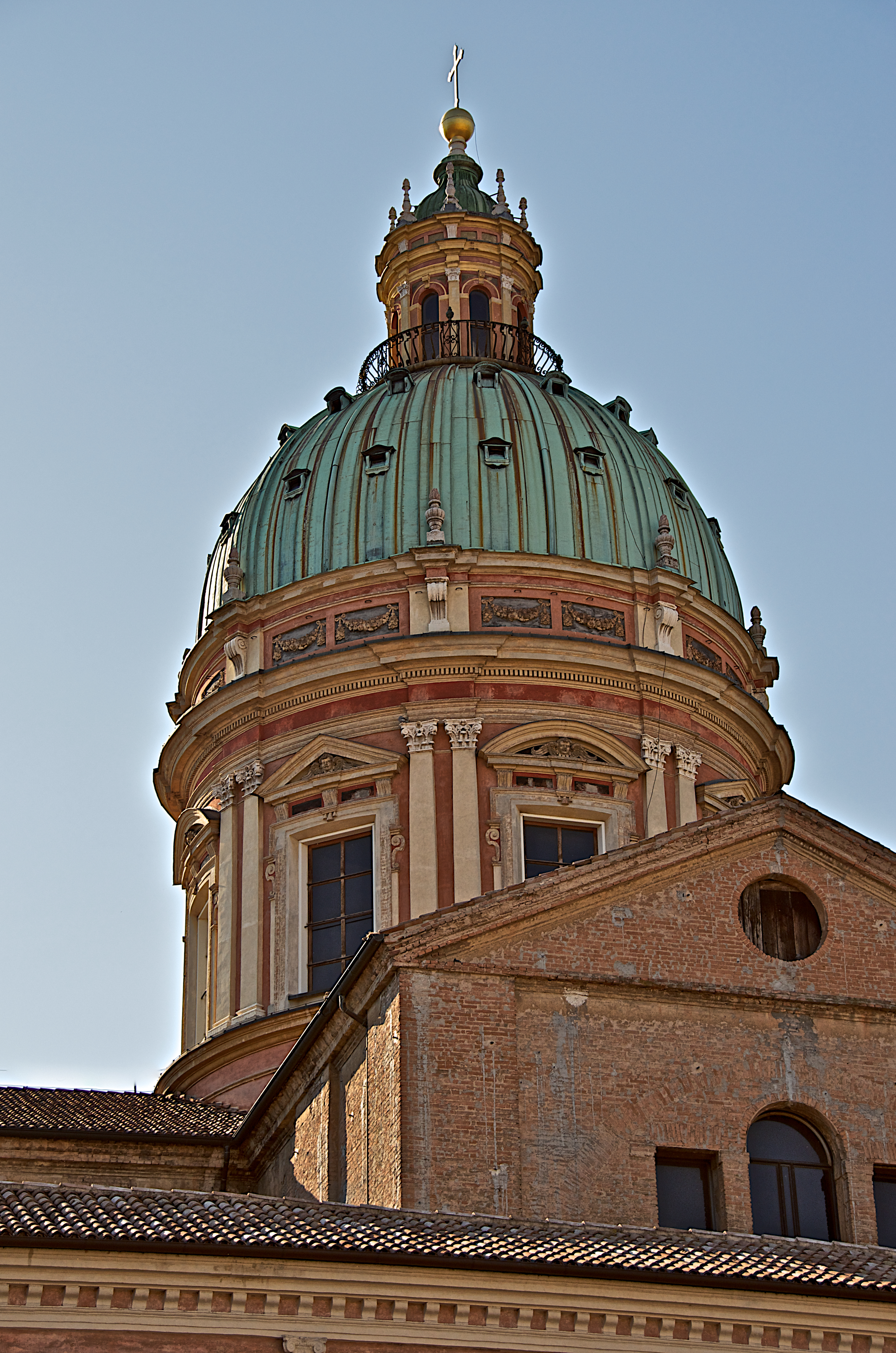
Cupola or dome of church

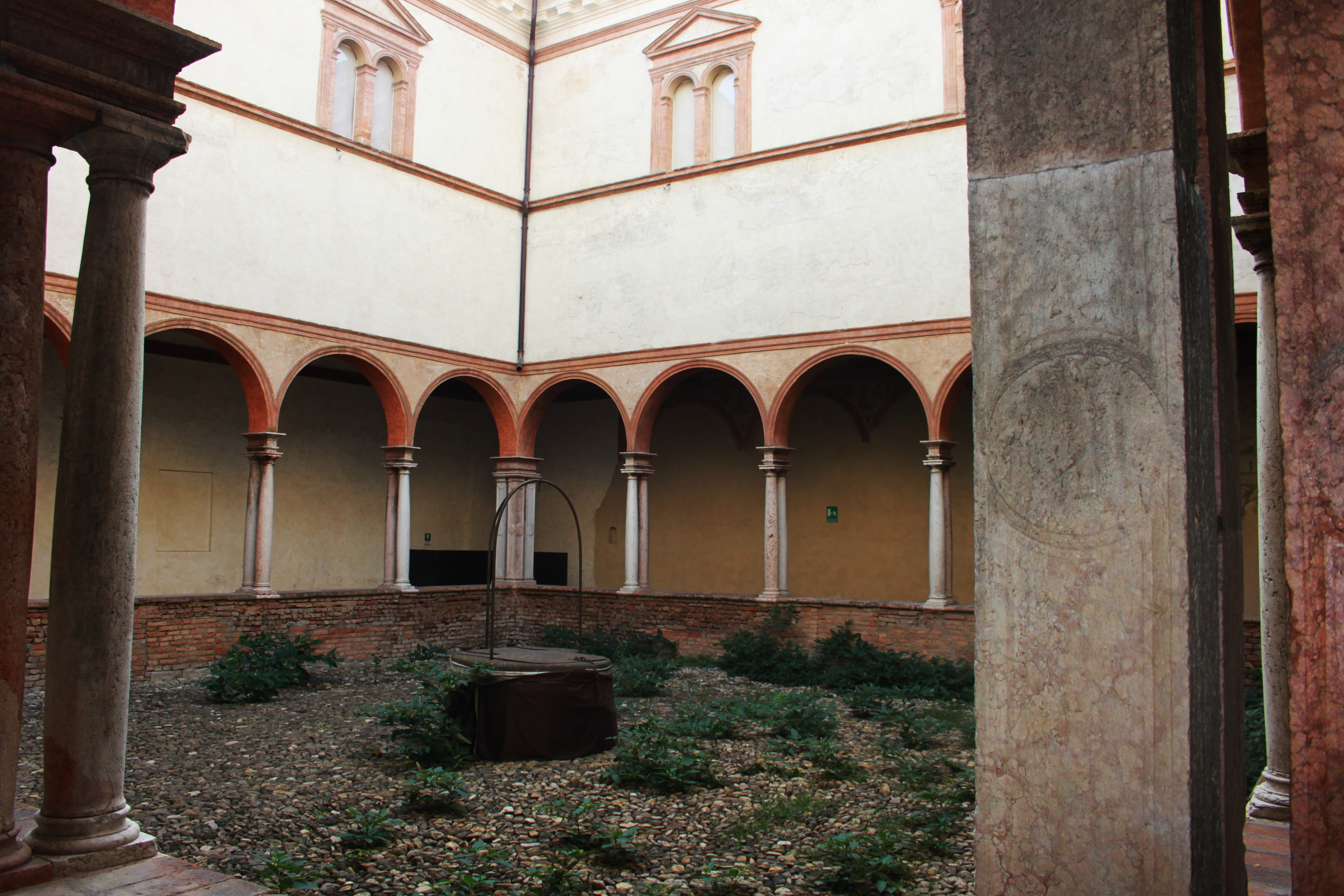
Smaller cloister

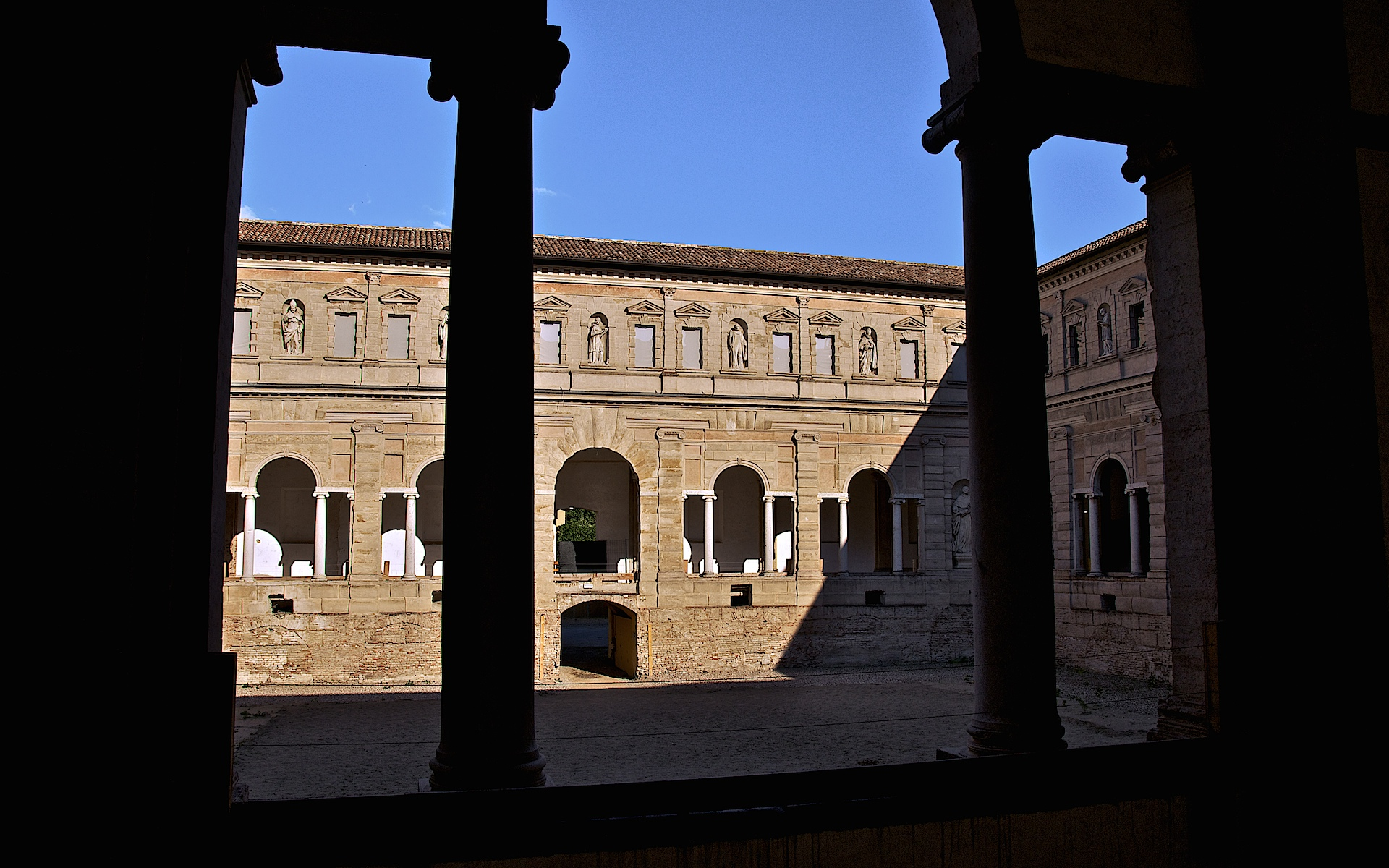
Larger cloister

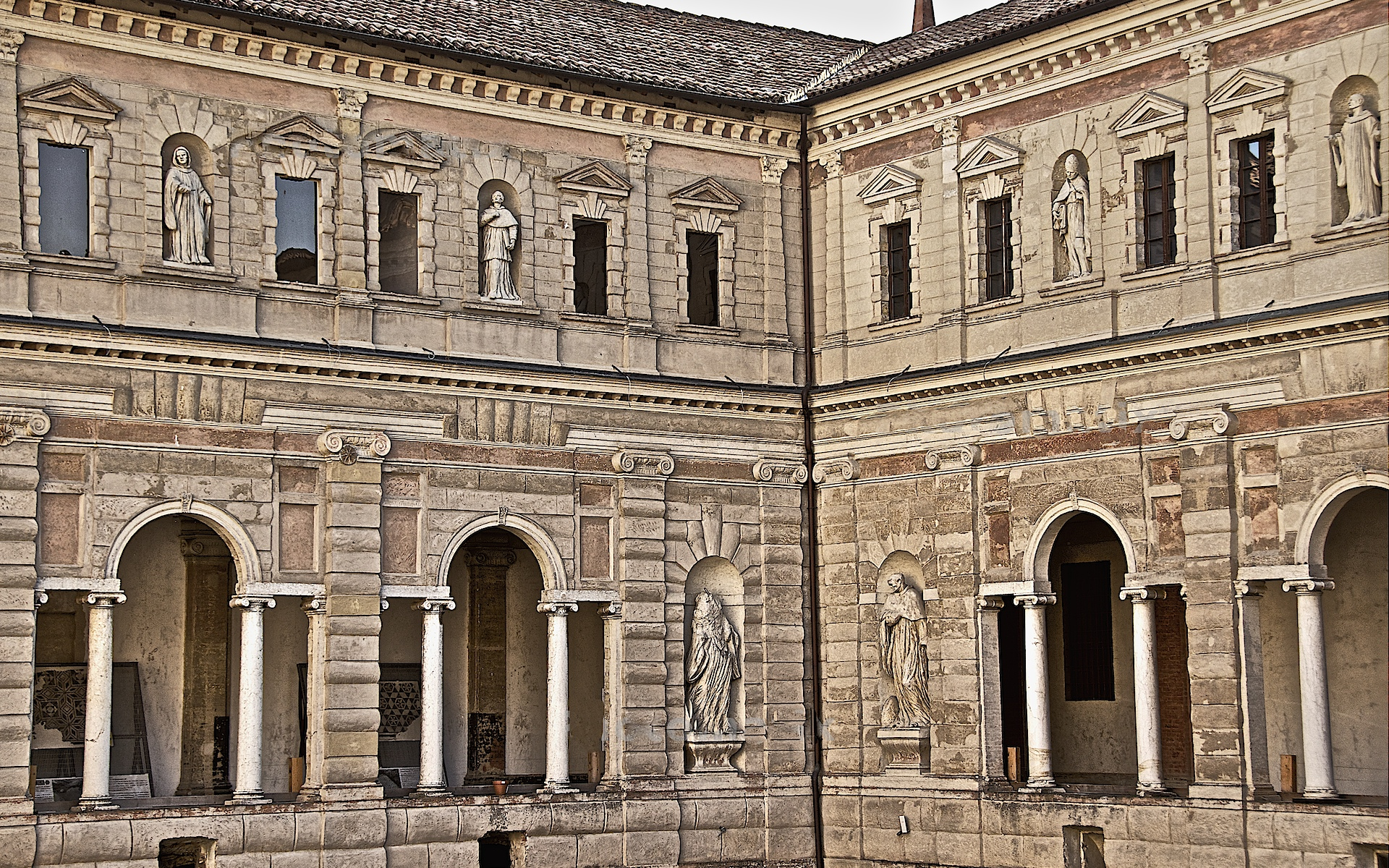
Larger cloister

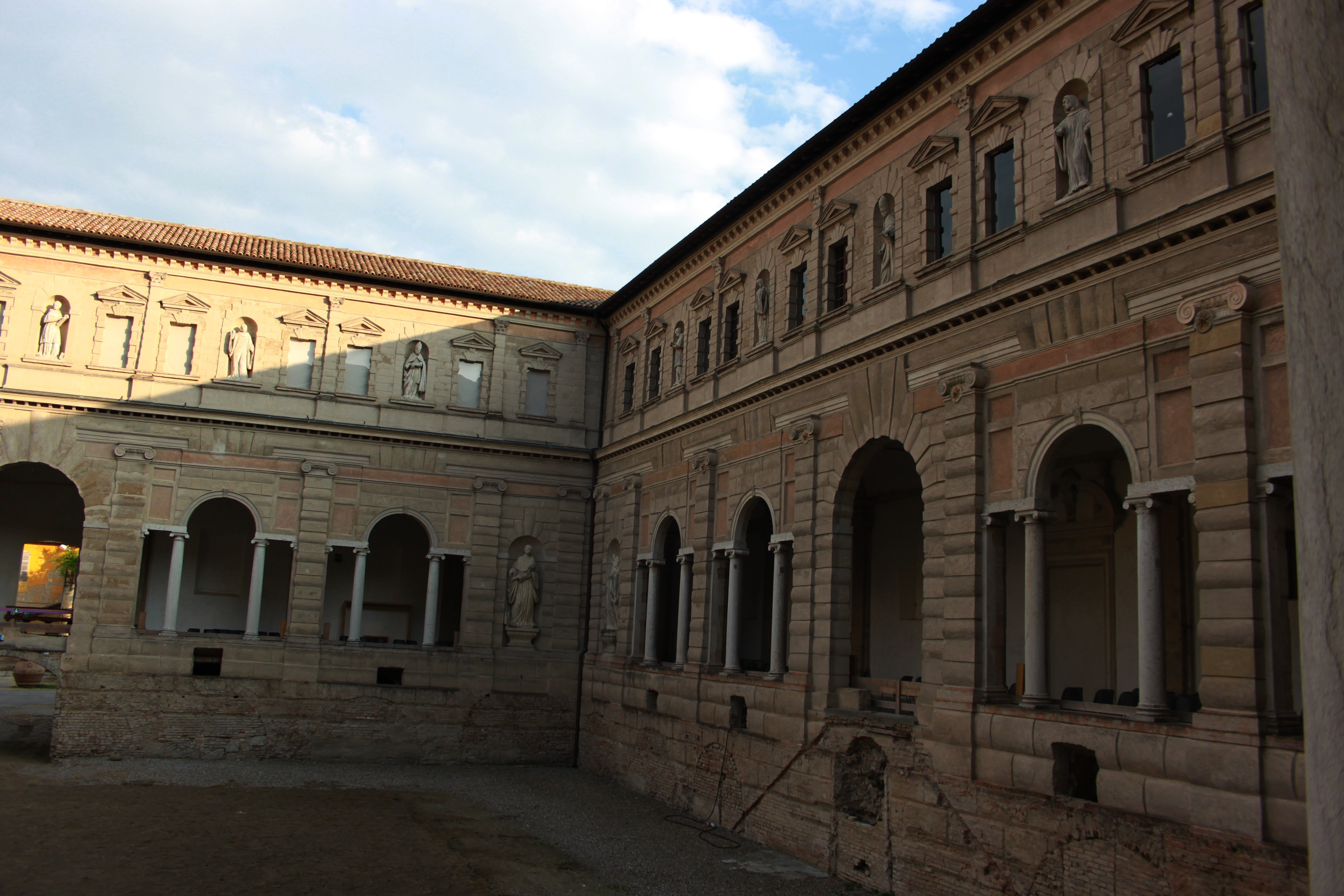
Larger cloister
