= Prosper of Reggio =

Bishop of Reggio Emilia

Saint Prosper of Reggio
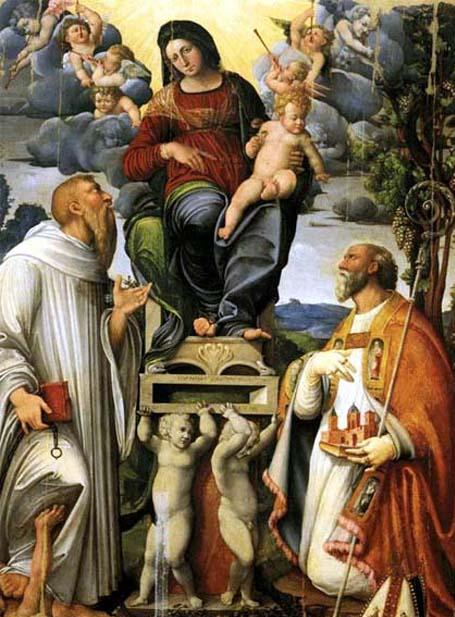
- Giovanni Soncini, The Virgin Mary with the Baby Jesus, Saint Bernard of Clairvaux, and Saint Prosper, 16th century.
- Died: c. 466 AD
- Venerated in: Roman Catholic Church
- Major shrine: Reggio Emilia
- Feast: 25 June; 24 November (Reggio Emilia)
- Attributes: Book; model of Reggio Emilia; episcopal dress
- Patronage: Reggio Emilia

Prosper of Reggio (Italian: San Prospero; died 25 June c. 466) is an Italian saint. Tradition holds that he was a bishop of Reggio Emilia for twenty-two years. Little is known of his life, but documents attest that he was indeed bishop of Reggio Emilia in the fifth century.

Remembered for his sense of charity, he is the patron saint of Reggio Emilia, although its cathedral is not dedicated to him. Instead, the church of San Prospero, which Prosper himself had built and dedicated to Saint Apollinaris, commemorates his episcopate. He died at Reggio Emilia.

== Veneration ==
Tradition holds that the Bishop Prosper was able to deflect the onslaught of Attila the Hun by miraculously calling for a fog to hide the city. The patron saint of Modena, Bishop Geminianus is also said to have performed the same miracle.

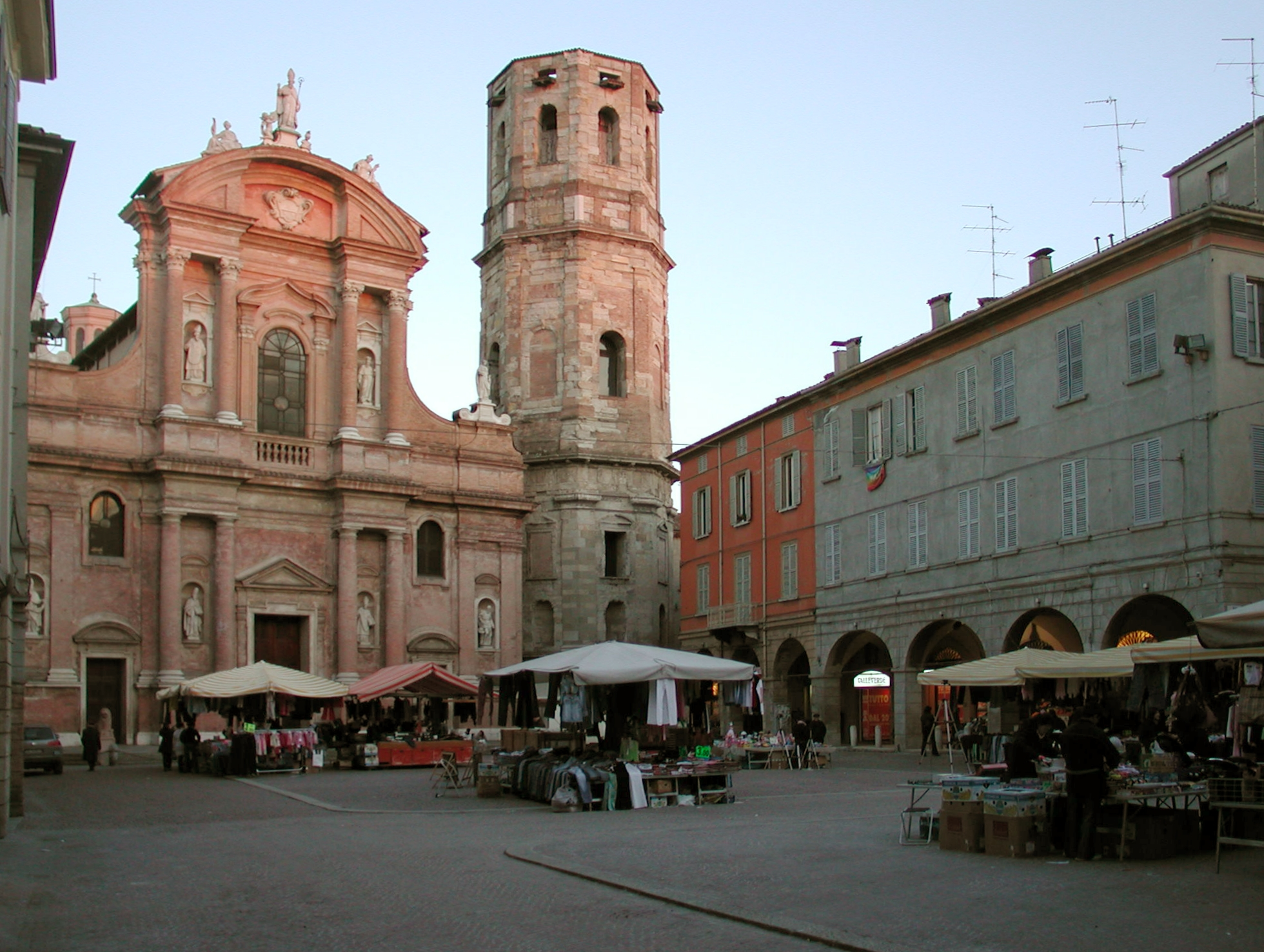
Piazza San Prospero, Reggio Emilia, with patron saint's basilica.

His cult was ancient and was diffused during the eleventh to fourteenth centuries. Prosper was venerated in Parma, Bologna, Lucca, and other cities beyond Reggio. Some thirty-one churches and chapels were dedicated to him in the Middle Ages. However, after the Council of Trent, his cult once again was confined only to Reggio. The Reggio diocese celebrates his cult locally on 24 November but 25 June is his feast day on general calendars.

The painting by Giovanni Soncini of Saints Bernard and Prosper is the only known painting by this artist.

== Relics ==
His relics were translated in 703 to a new church built in his honor by Thomas, a subsequent bishop of Reggio. They lay alongside those of Venerius the Hermit and Cosmas and Damian.

In the tenth century, Reggio being vulnerable to attacks from the sea, Bishop Ermenald (Ermenaldo) transported his relics to the Cathedral of Santa Maria in the center of the city while the church dedicated to Prosper was being built. This was completed by his successor Tenzo (Tenzone) (979). Pope Gregory V consecrated the church in 997. In the 16th century, the church was rebuilt; Prosper's body lies under the great altar.

== See also ==
- Catholic Church in Italy
- List of early Christian saints
- Saint Prosper of Reggio, patron saint archive
