= San Prospero, Reggio Emilia =

Roman Catholic Basilica in Reggio Emilia, Italy

Coordinates: 44.6971°N 10.6323°E

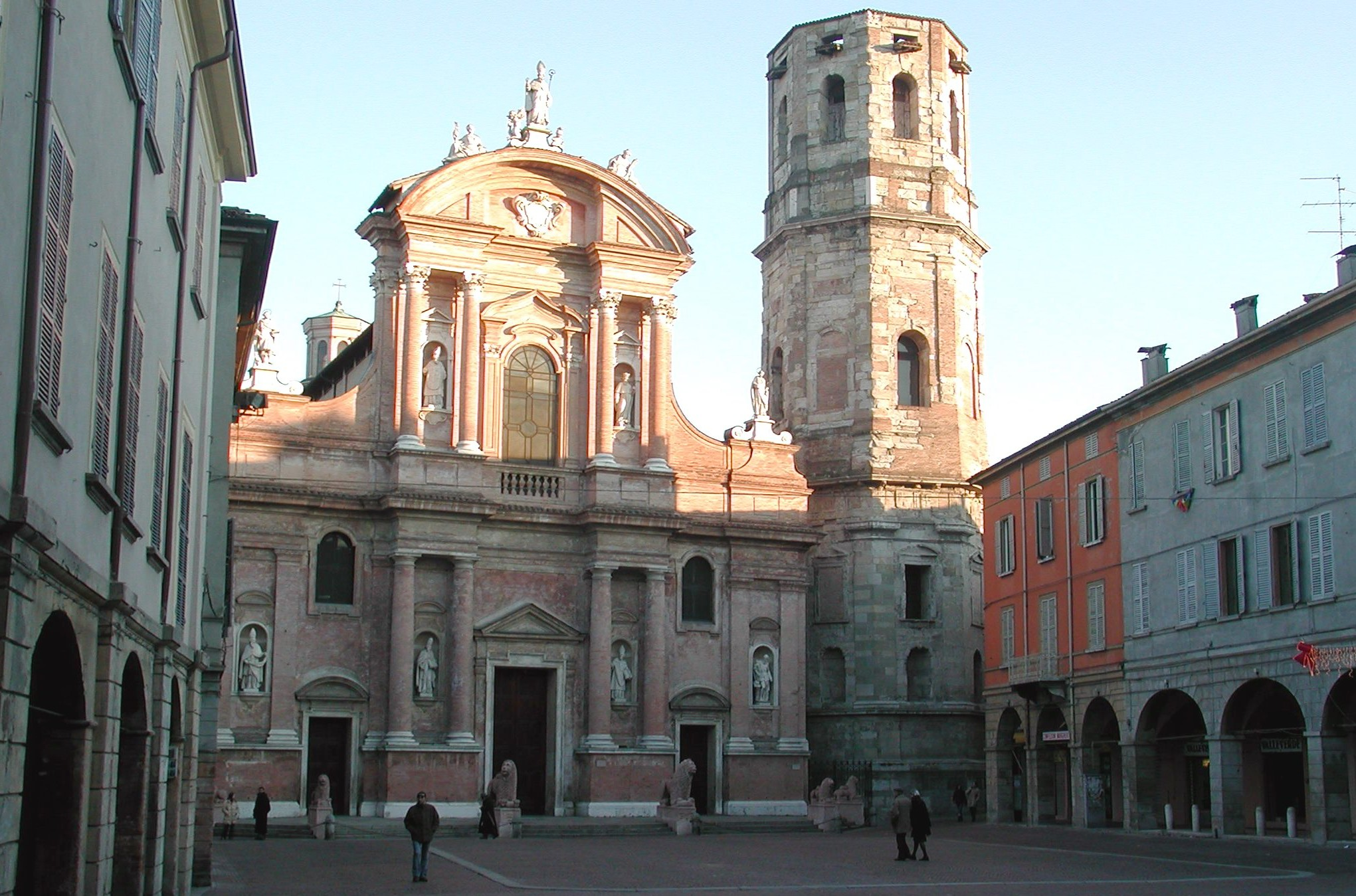
church and belltower

The Basilica of San Prospero is a Renaissance-style, Roman Catholic church with a late Baroque-style facade, located on Piazza di San Prospero in central Reggio Emilia, Italy.

== History and Exterior ==
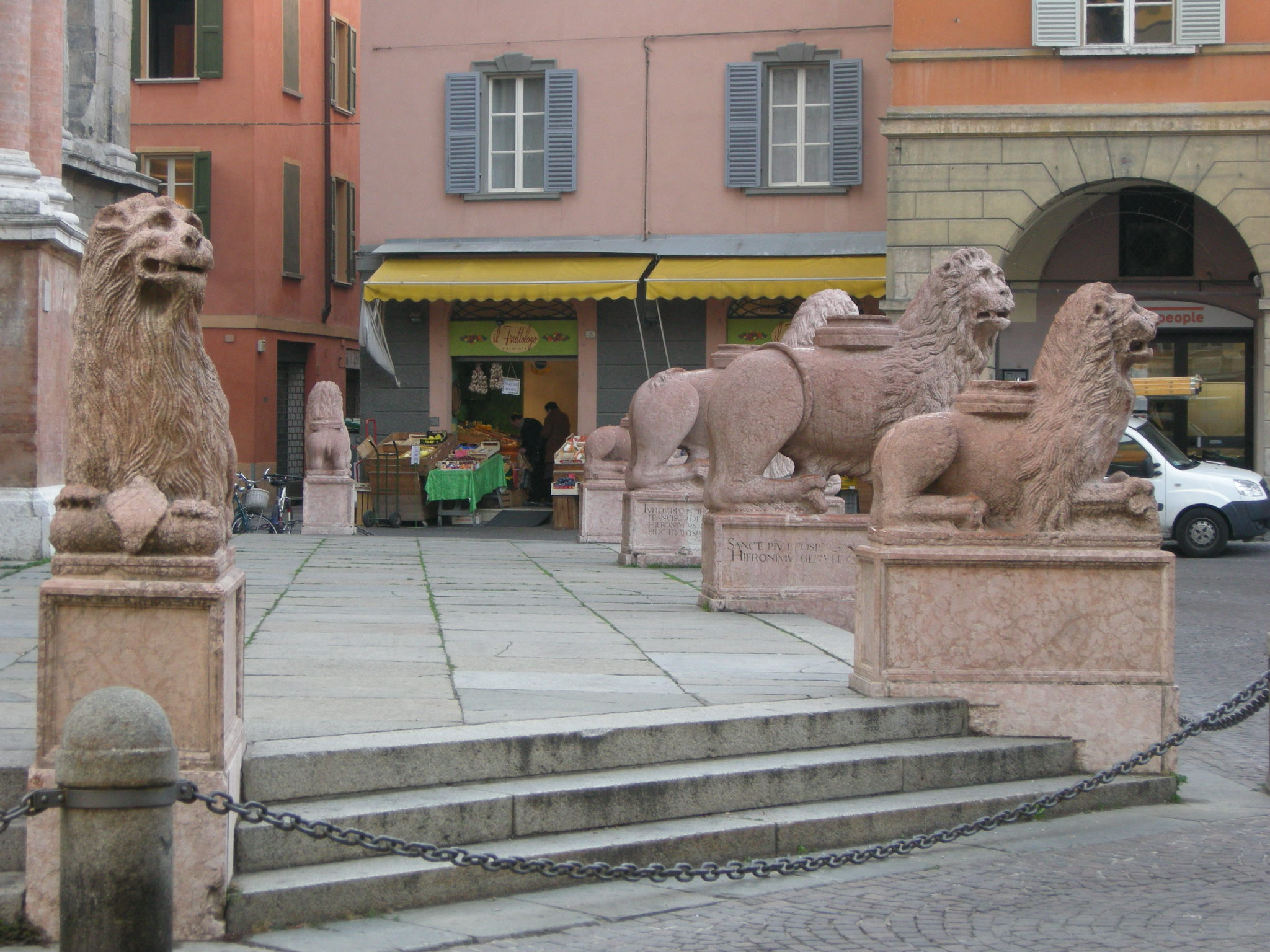
Lions in front of church

A church known as San Prospero di Castello, located inside the city walls, is known prior to 997. San Prospero, a fifth century bishop, became the patron saint of the town. In 1514, during the expansion of the city walls, the church and its adjacent monastery, the dilapidated church, nearly in ruins, was demolished. The church was moved some 600 meters and its adjacent bell tower underwent reconstructions. By 1527, a new church was completed with designs by Luca Corti and Matteo Florentino. Minor chapels were added until 1543, when the basilica was reconsecrated. Major changes to the octagonal belltower were designed by Cristoforo Ricci and Giulio Romano in 1536–1570. The facade of the church had been left incomplete until it was completed in 1748–1753 using designs of Giovanni Battista Cattani. While the statues that festoon the facade are contemporary with Cattani's design. On the dais in front of the church are placed six lions (1501), sculpted in rose-colored marble by Gaspare Bigi, and meant to be bases for columns of a portico that had been planned for the church front. In the past, some guides had attributed the lions to Romanesque period sculptors.

== Interior ==
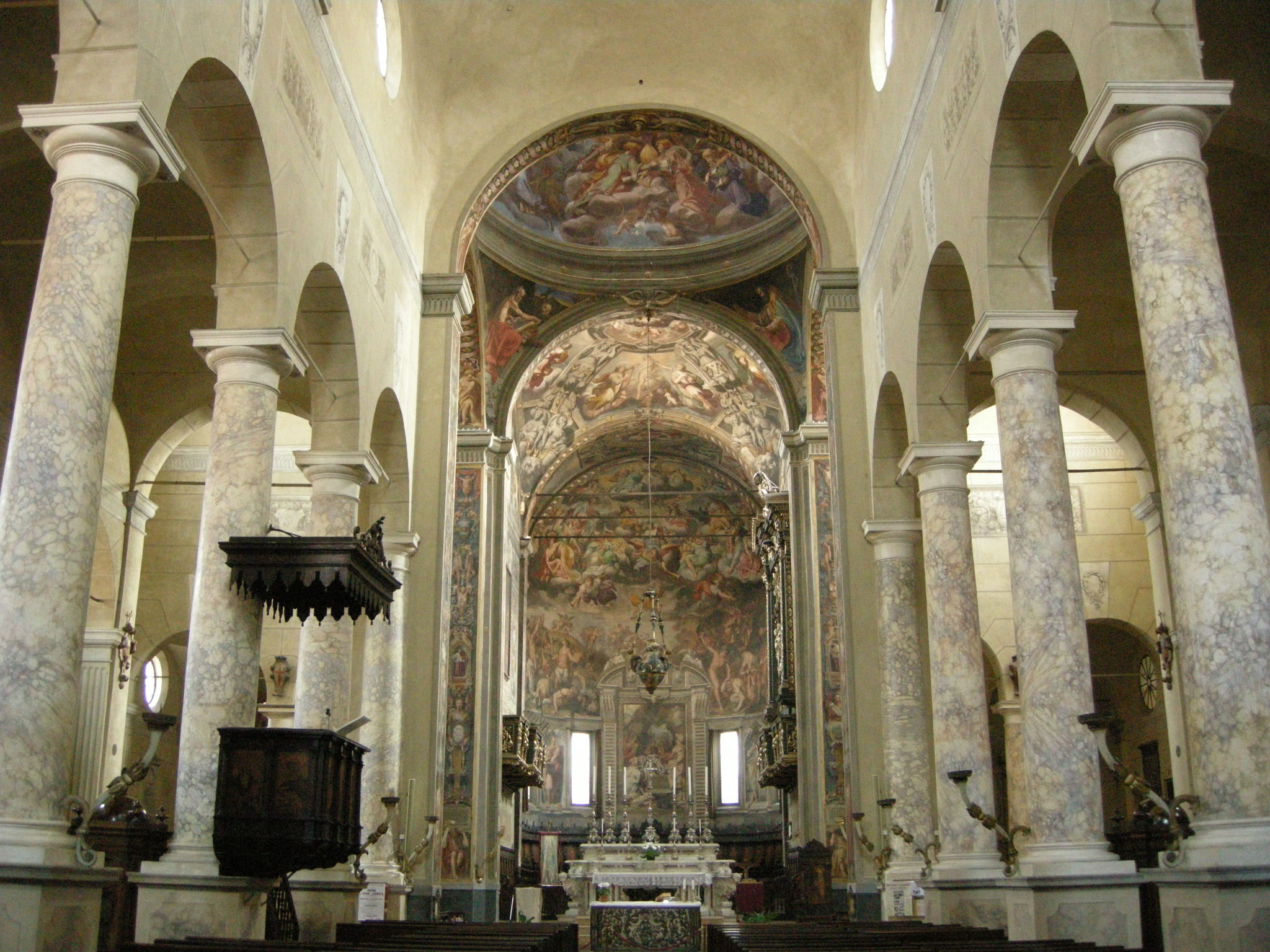
interior

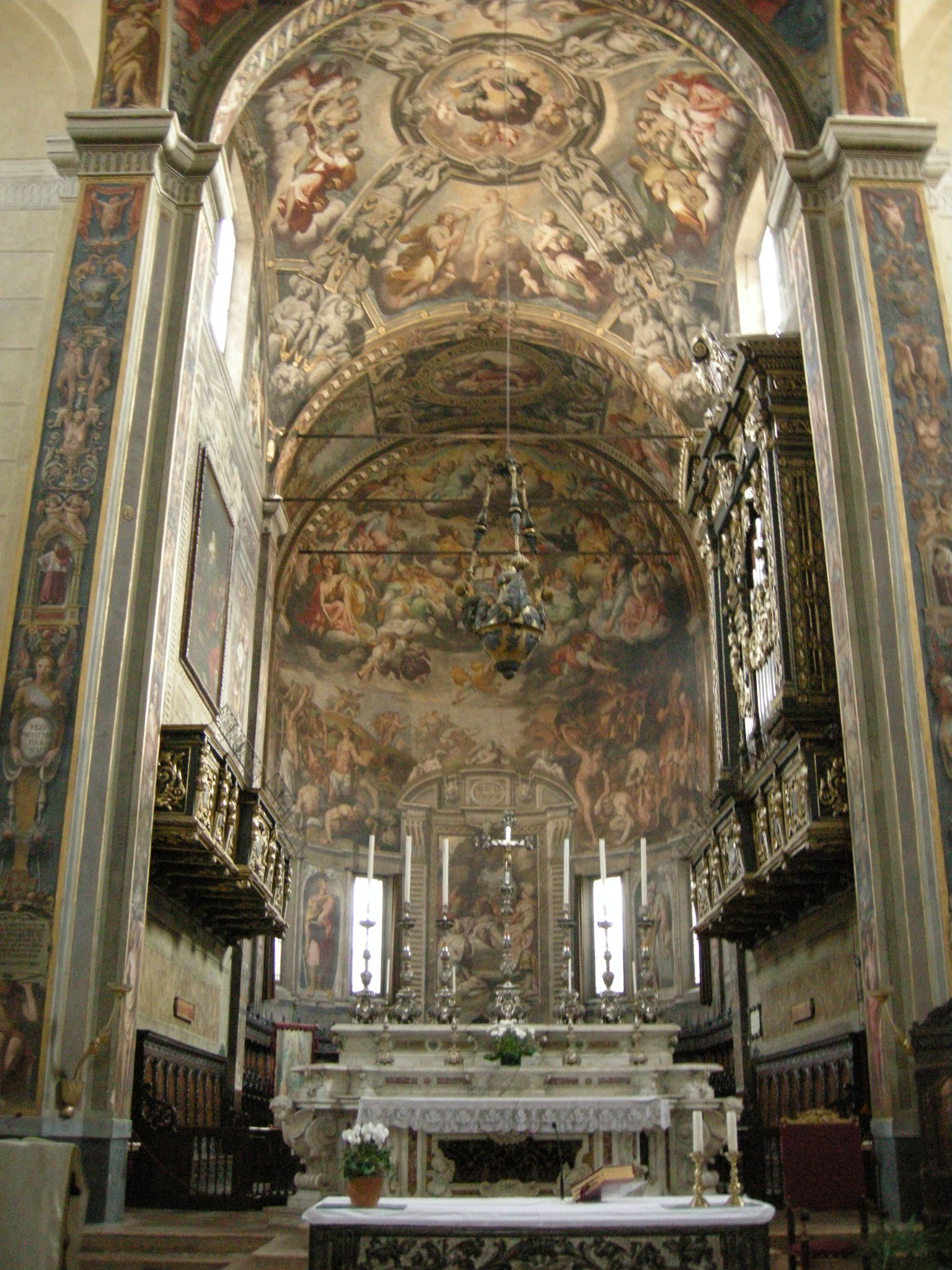
Frescoed Apse

The third altar on the right has an altarpiece by Michelangelo Anselmi depicting the Baptism of Christ. The fourth altar has a canvas depicting the Charity of St Omobono by Nicolò Patarazzi. The sixth altarpiece on the right is a Holy Family by Alessandro Tiarini.

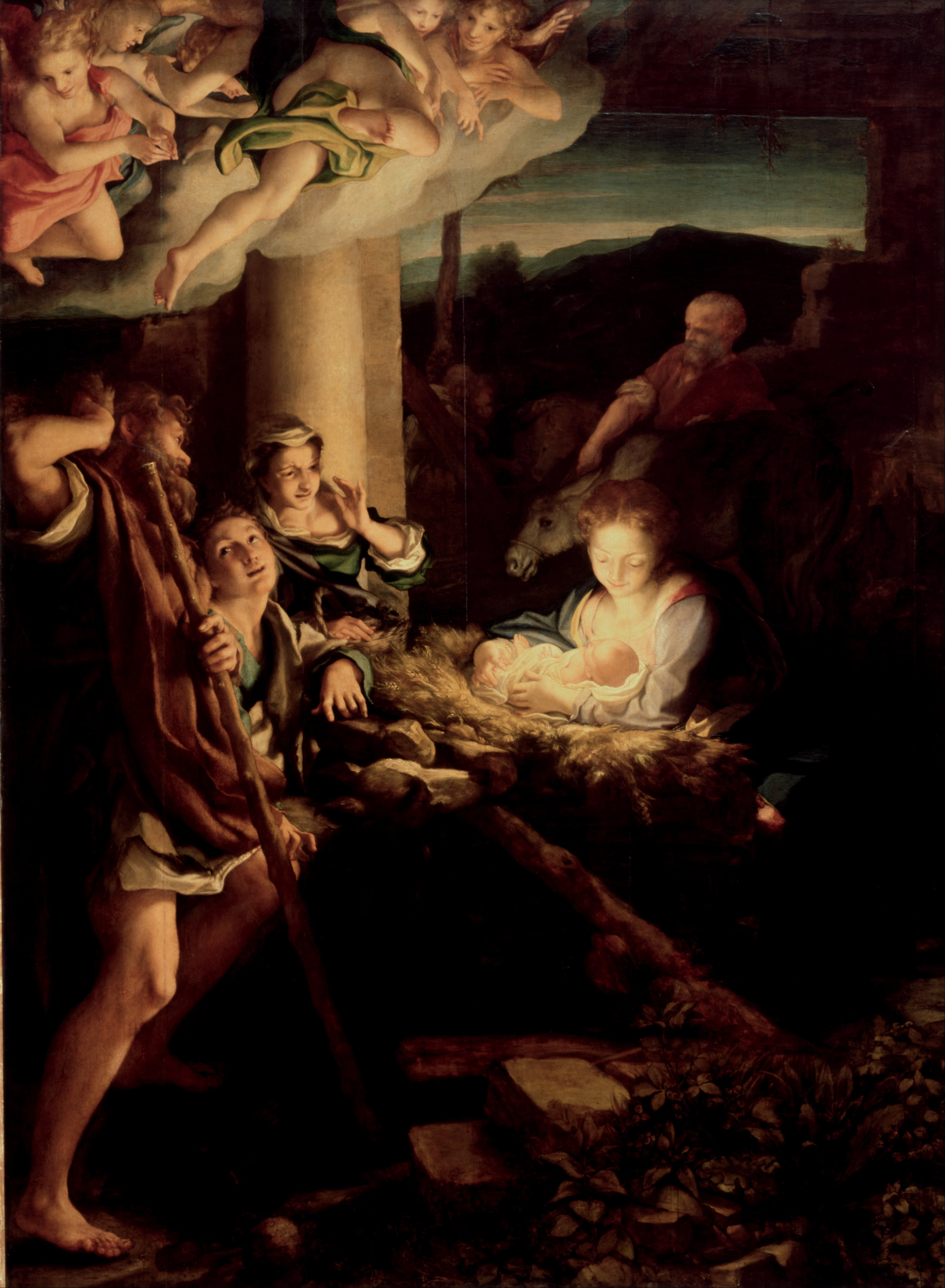
Original Nativity or La Notte by Corregio

The fifth altarpiece on the right, in the chapel originally belonging to the Pratonero family, originally displayed the Correggio masterpiece of La Notte (1522), also called the Nativity or Holy Night. Documentation shows that by 1587, the Dukes of Modena desired the painting. Ultimately, in 1640, the painting was absconded from the chapel by the Duke Francesco I d'Este for his private collection, a sacrilege which generated a local uproar. A copy for this chapel was painted by Jean Boulanger. La Notte was sold in 1745 to the Duke of Saxony, and is now found in the Dresden Gallery.

In the right transept, on the west wall, is a canvas depicting the Madonna and St Matthew, a copy also by Jean Boulanger of the original by Annibale Carracci, which was also sold to the Dresden Gemaldegalerie. Below that painting is a Burial of Christ by Lodovico Parisetti. On the main altar of the transept is a Madonna and Child (1555) by Prospero Sogari. In the first chapel on the right of the presbytery are three statues of saints, attributed to Nicola Sampolo.

The main altar in the presbytery is said to contain the relics of the patron saint. The ceiling fresco depicts a Glory of Saints Prosper and Venerius (1597–1598) by Camillo Procaccini. In the apse are a Last Judgement and below a Deposition. The paintings depicting the Resurrection of the son of the Widow of Naim and the Fall of Jezebel (1589) were painted by Bernardino Campi. The cupola decoration with a second Glory of St Prosper (1885) is attributed to Giulio Ferrari.

The second altar on the left has an altarpiece by Francesco Stringa depicting the Madonna and Saints. The ceiling of this chapel was frescoed by Pietro Desani. The third altar on the left has an altarpiece by Orazio Talami depicting the Cathedra of St Peter. The fifth altar on the left has a canvas depicting the Madonna and Child with St Apollonia attributed to Denis Calvaert. The sixth altarpiece on the right is a Holy Family by Alessandro Tiarini. A St Paul on the Road to Tarsus was painted by Bernardino Zacchetti.

In the left transept is a baptismal font; and Crucifix by Prospero Sogari. In addition the Funeral Monument of Ruffino Gabbioneta (1527), the governor of the city under Leo X, was sculpted by Bartolomeo Spani.

== Sources ==
Italy: Handbook for Travellers, First Part: Northern Italy, including Leghorn, Florence, Ravenna, and routes ... (1906) by Karl Baedeker (Firm), New York, Charles Scribner and Sons, Page 362.

- Translated in part from Italian Wikipedia entry.
