= Desani =

Desani is a surname. Notable people with the surname include:

- G. V. Desani (1909–2000), Indian writer and philosopher
- Pietro Desani (1585–1647), Italian painter

== See also ==
- Dasani
