= Burani =

Burani is an Italian and kazakh surname. Notable people with this surname include:

- Agostina Burani (born 1991), Argentine basketball player
- Francesco Burani, Baroque Italian designer and engraver
- Mariella Burani, founder of Mariella Burani Fashion Group
- Paul Burani (1845–1901), French author and actor

== See also ==
- Burano (disambiguation)
