= Orazio Talami =

Italian painter

Orazio Talami (1624 – September 15, 1705) was an Italian painter of the Baroque period, active mainly in Bologna and Reggio Emilia.

== Biography ==
Talami was born and died in Reggio Emilia. He was a pupil of the painter Pietro Desani. He may have also spent some years of his youth working with Leonello Spada. He painted Cathedra of St Peter for the church of San Prospero in Reggio, a St Francis Xavier and the Redemption of the Blessed Slaves for San Giacomo; a St Phillip Benizzi for the Basilica della Ghiara; a St Joseph for the church of San Giorgio; a St Michele for the church of San Bartolommeo; a St Contardo for the church of San Nazzaro; a St Peter in Chains for the church of San Agostino; and Three Magi for San Filippo Neri in Reggio. He ceased to paint after 1699.

The painters Jacopo Baccarini and Mattia Benedetti were among his pupils.
