= Pier Martire Armani =

Italian painter

Pier Martire or Pier Martino Armani (January 14, 1613 – July 10, 1699) was an Italian painter of the Baroque period. He was born and worked in Reggio.

He trained as a pupil of Leonello Spada and Sebastiano Vercellesi. He was one of the artists called to decorate the Basilica della Ghiara in Modena.
