= Burano (disambiguation) =

Burano is an island in the Venetian Lagoon, Italy.

Burano may also refer to:

- Burano (building), a residential high-rise condominium complex in Toronto, Ontario, Canada
- Burano (river), a river in Umbria and Marche, Italy
- Lago di Burano, lake at Capalbio in the Province of Grosseto, Tuscany, Italy.
- Sony Burano, a digital cinema camera.

== See also ==
- Burani
- Murano
