= Luca Barbieri =

Italian painter

Luca Barbieri was an Italian painter of the late-Renaissance and early-Baroque. He was born in Bologna. He was a pupil of Alessandro Tiarini. He painted quadratura, and, in conjunction with Francesco Carbone, who painted the figures. He flourished at the end of the 16th and the beginning of the 17th century. He is not to be confused with Ludovico Barbieri, a painter of Bologna of the same period.
