= Mattia Benedetti =

Italian painter

Mattia Benedetti was an Italian painter active in the 18th century. He was born in Reggio Emilia, and a pupil of Orazio Talami. He active as a fresco painter, active in painting quadratura. He painted the ceiling (1701) of the church of Sant' Antonio at Brescia. In Reggio-Emilia he painted the ceiling of the Capella maggiore of the Monache Bianchi, and the ceiling of the Oratory of the San Filippo Neri. His brother Ludovico or Lodovico was known for painting chiaroscuro and also perspective. Lodovico painted in the church of San Spiridone in Reggio-Emilia, as well as other churches.

== Sources ==
- Bryan, Michael (1886). Robert Edmund Graves (ed.). Dictionary of Painters and Engravers, Biographical and Critical. Vol. I: A-K. London: George Bell and Sons. p. 110.
