= Bernardino Zacchetti =

Italian painter

Bernardino Zacchetti (active c. 1523) was an Italian painter of the Renaissance period. He was born in Reggio Emilia. His style recalls Raphael, and is also said to have worked with Michelangelo in the Sistine Chapel. His picture of St Paul on the Road to Tarsus in the church of San Prospero at Reggio recalls Il Garofalo. One of his pupils, Giovanni Soncini was the godfather of Corregio's second daughter.
