= Jacopo Baccarini =

Italian painter

Jacopo Baccarini (c. 1605–1682) was an Italian painter of the Baroque period born in Reggio, where he lived and painted. He trained with Orazio Talami (1624–1708). He painted Repose during flight to Egypt and Death of St Alessio for the church of San Filippo in Reggio. He is also known as Jacopo da Reggio or Giacomo Baccarini.
