= Giovanni Soncini =

Italian painter

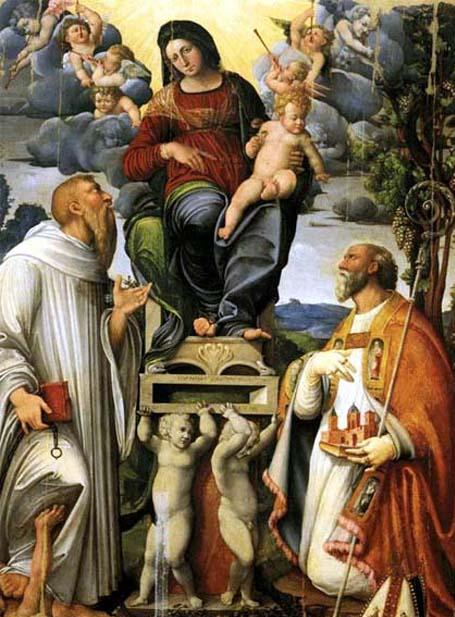
The Virgin Mary with the Baby Jesus, Saint Bernard of Clairvaux, and Saint Prosper.

Giovanni Soncini was a painter from Reggio Emilia, Italy, who was active in Parma during the Renaissance. It is likely that he was a pupil of Bernardino Zacchetti from Reggio. Soncini was the godfather of Correggio's second daughter.

According to Mary Vaccaro, writing in the journal Renaissance Studies, Soncini was a "minor painter" who has been "largely, and perhaps deservedly, forgotten in the history of art". There is only one known signed picture by Soncini.
