= Alessandro Tiarini =

Italian painter (1577–1668)

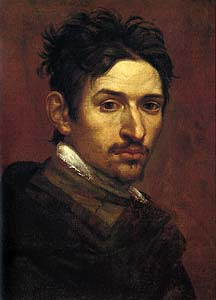
- Self-Portrait, Galleria Savelli, Bologna
- Born: 20 March 1577; Bologna, Papal States
- Died: 8 February 1668 (aged 90); Bologna, Papal States
- Education: Prospero Fontana; Bartolomeo Cesi
- Known for: Painting
- Movement: Late-Renaissance and Baroque

Alessandro Tiarini (20 March 1577 – 8 February 1668) was an Italian Baroque painter of the Bolognese School.

== Biography ==
=== Early life and education ===
Alessandro Tiarini was born in Bologna. His mother died when he was a child, and he was raised by an aunt. Early on his family tried, unsuccessfully, to guide him towards becoming a cleric. He was the godson of the painter Lavinia Fontana and received his first training in Bologna under her father, Prospero Fontana, until the latter’s death in 1597. After an unsuccessful attempt to enter the Carracci Academy, he studied for a brief period with Bartolomeo Cesi. Forced to leave Bologna because of a lawsuit, Tiarini then went to Florence, where he is documented between 1599 and 1606. There he attracted the attention of Domenico Passignano, who introduced him to the circle of Florentine proto-Baroque painters then advocating a return to a more naturalistic style of figure painting.

In 1602 Tiarini took part in the fresco decoration of the cloister of Sant'Antonio in the monastery of San Marco, under the supervision of Bernardino Poccetti and Jacopo da Empoli. Shortly afterwards he is documented as receiving several commissions throughout provincial Tuscany, including Pescia, which he visited between 1602 and 1604. These pictures, such as the Adoration of the Shepherds (c. 1605; Florence, Palazzo Pitti), reveal a wide range of stylistic influences, not only from Tuscany but also from Venice and Bologna (where he may have returned for brief visits).

=== Mature work ===
Around 1606–7 Tiarini returned to Bologna, possibly at the request of Ludovico Carracci. According to Malvasia, his first painting carried out after his return was the Martyrdom of St. Barbara (c. 1607–8; Bologna, San Petronio). By about the middle of the second decade of the century, Tiarini reached his artistic maturity with such works as the Funeral of the Virgin (c. 1614–15; Pinacoteca Nazionale di Bologna) and the Miracle of St. Dominic, painted for the Cappella dell’Arca in the church of San Domenico (1615). These masterpieces, in the ‘gigantic’ manner of Ludovico, form a striking contrast with the much more sophisticated and classicizing work of the then fashionable Guido Reni.

In 1618 Tiarini was commissioned to paint a series of frescoes in the Cappella Ruggeri-Brami in the Basilica della Ghiara, Reggio Emilia. A few years later he undertook the huge task of decorating in fresco the major part of the sanctuary of the same church: first the vault of the presbytery and west transept (1621–3) and later the arch and ceiling of the apse (1624–9). During this same decade Tiarini executed numerous other commissions for patrons in Reggio Emilia, Bologna, Parma, Mantua, Cremona and Faenza. In such works as the Annunciation (c. 1620–25; Pinacoteca Nazionale di Bologna) and the Martyrdom of St. Dorothy (c. 1625–30; Rome, Galleria Doria Pamphilj), the sentimentalism of Tiarini’s religious works reached a high point.

=== Later work ===
Among Tiarini’s later paintings, which are generally characterized by a gradual decline in expressive force and originality, is the occasional masterpiece, such as the Presentation of the Virgin in the Temple (Santa Maria dei Servi, Bologna) and the Agony in the Garden (Padua, Musei Civici). In 1628, Tiarini painted the Story of Gerusalemme Liberata for the Farnese Palazzo del Giardino in Parma. In the same period he also painted the Raising of the Cross for the Oratorio della Buona Morte in Reggio, a work now displayed in the Galleria Estense of Modena and Judith and Holofernes for the church of Santa Maria di Canepanova in Pavia.

Tiarini went on painting into the 1650s, but his last works seem tired and repetitive. He died in Bologna on 8 February 1668, aged 90. His closest pupils were Francesco Carbone and Luca Barbieri. His sons Antonio Tiarini (1625–1703) and Francesco Tiarini (fl. c. 1654) were also painters.

== Gallery ==
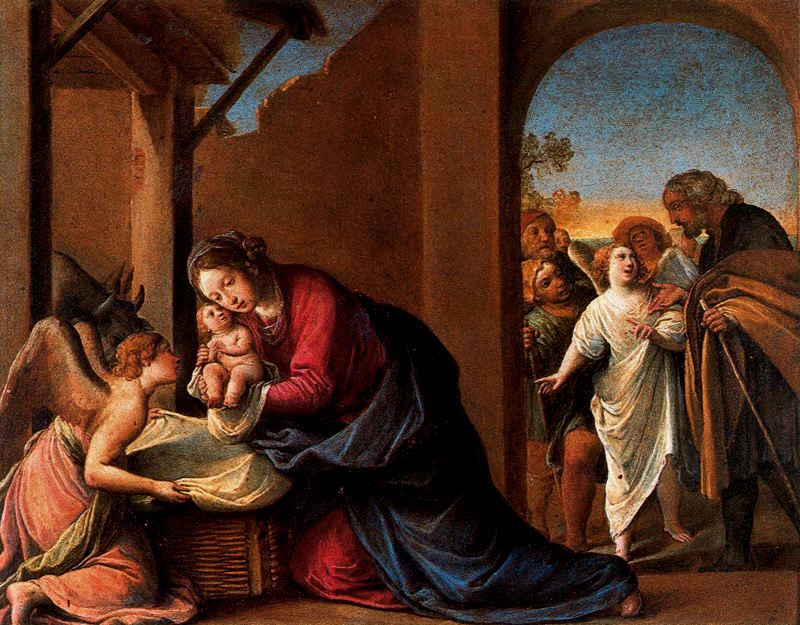
Nativity (Ufizzi, Florence)

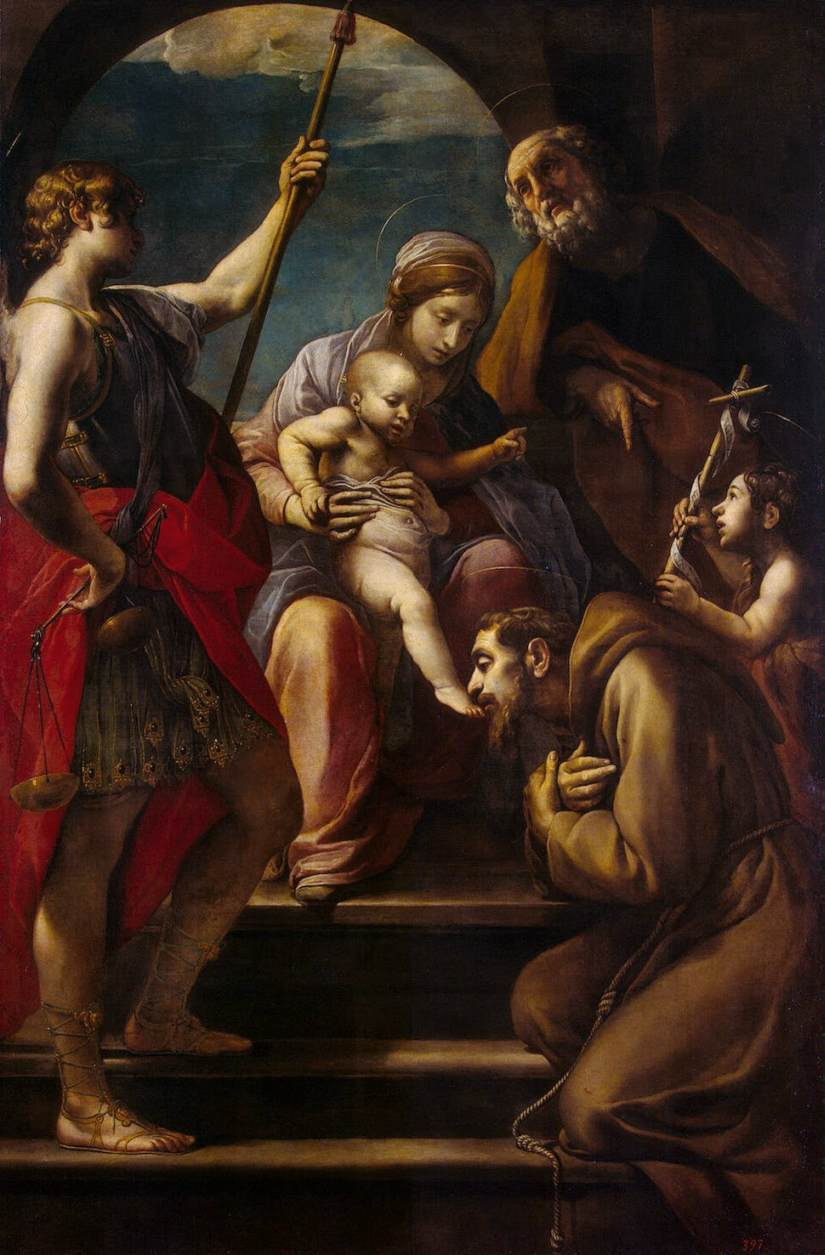
Holy Family (Hermitage, St Petersburg)

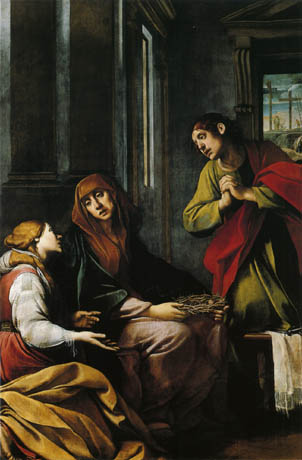
Pietà (San Benedetto, Bologna)

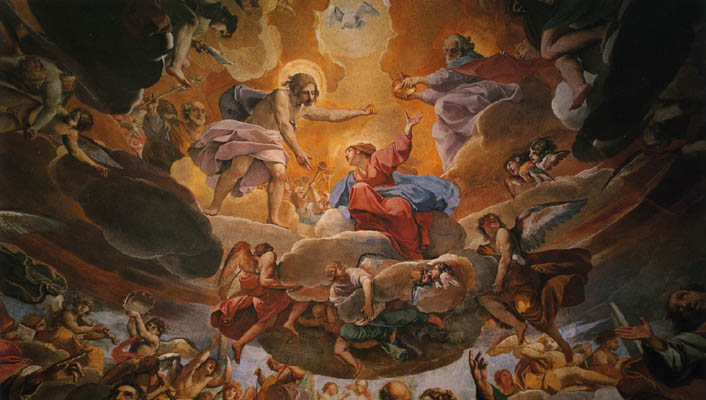
Coronation of Virgin
(Basilica della Ghiara, Reggio Emilia)

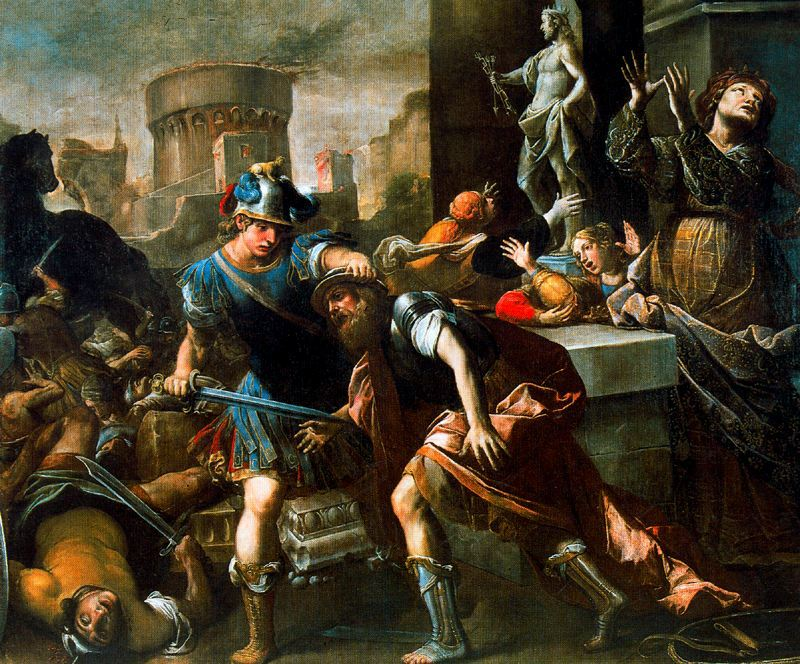
Sack of Troy (Galleria Nazionale, Rome)

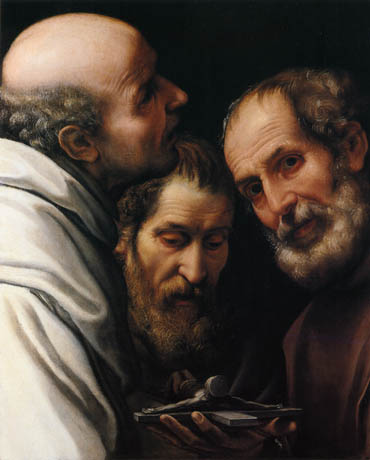
Three Monks contemplate Crucifix (Palazzo Rosso, Genoa)

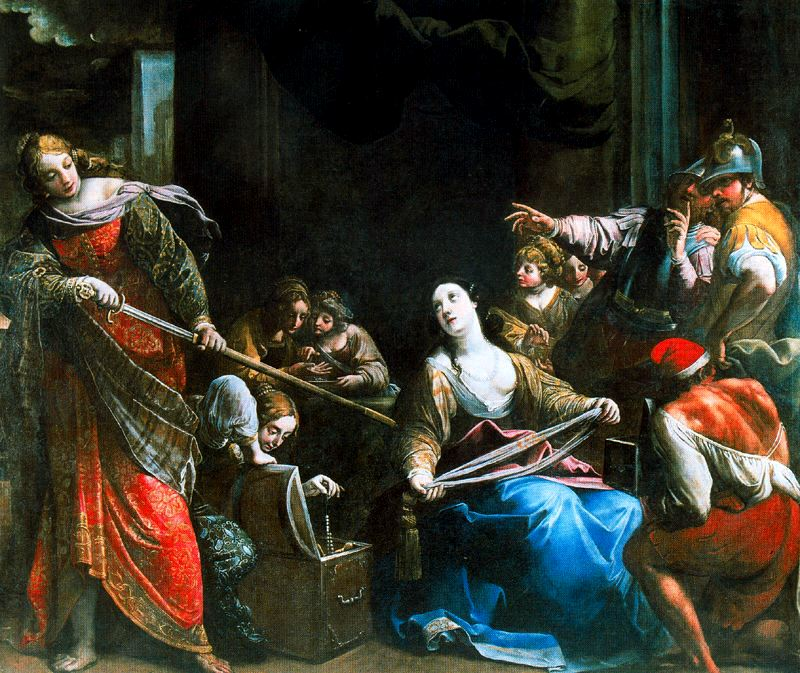
Achilles and the daughters of Licomedes (Galleria Nazionale, Rome)

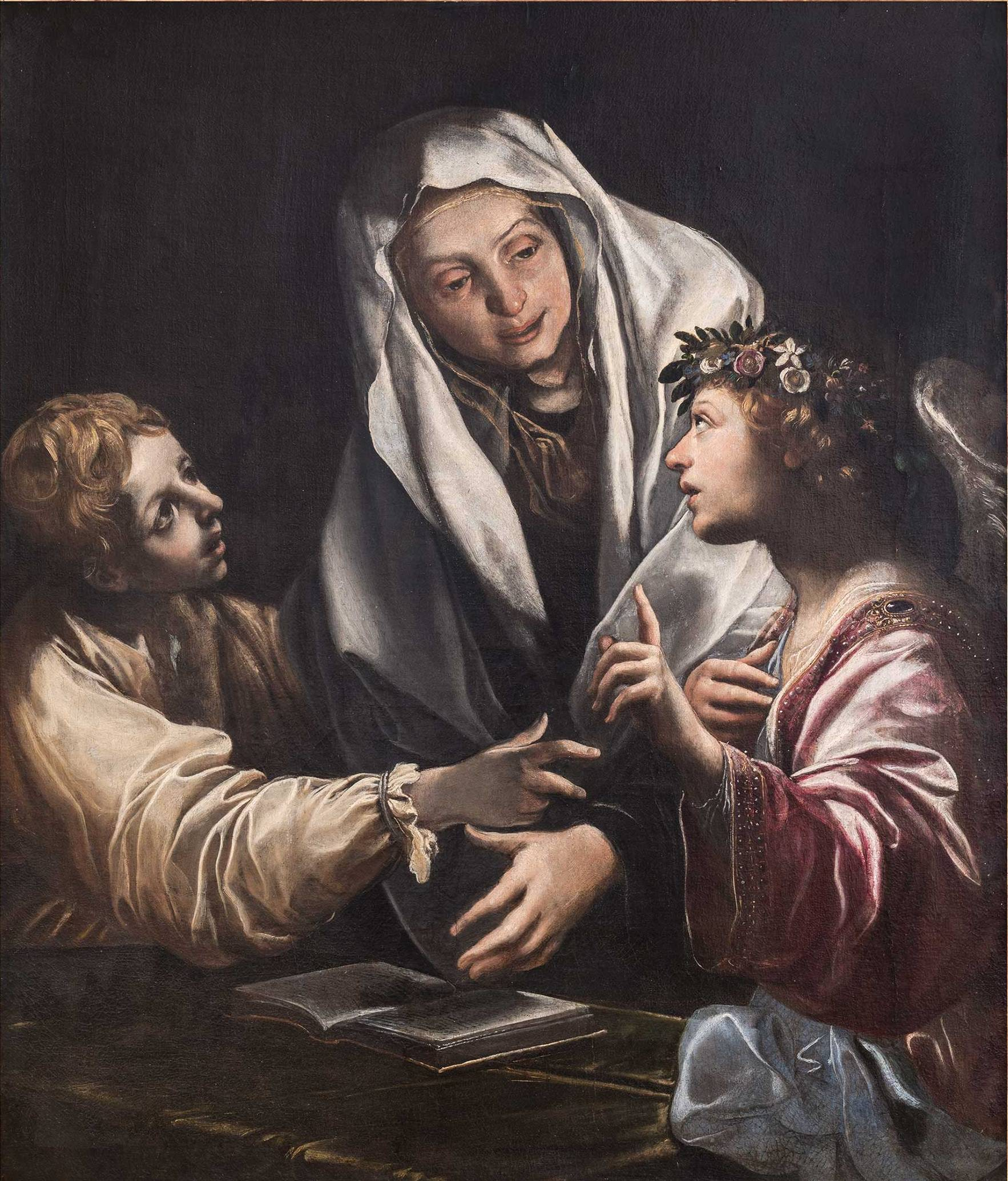
The apparition to Saint Frances of Rome, Palazzo Magnani, Bologna
