= Francesco Burani =

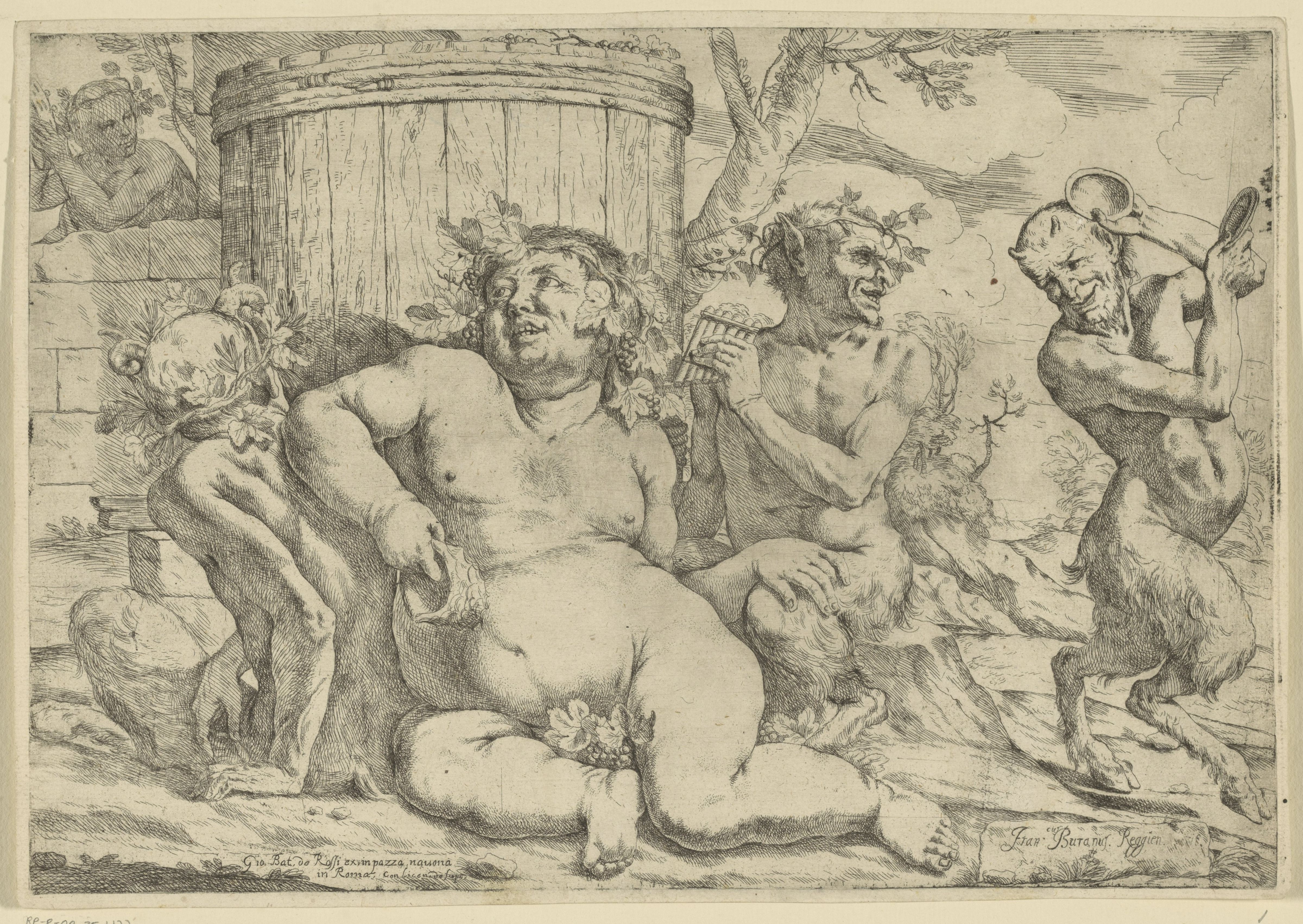

Francesco Burani was an Italian designer and engraver of the Baroque period, born at Reggio Emilia. He made an etching of Bacchus sitting with three Satyrs executed in the style of Jusepe Ribera.
