= Pietro Desani =

Italian painter

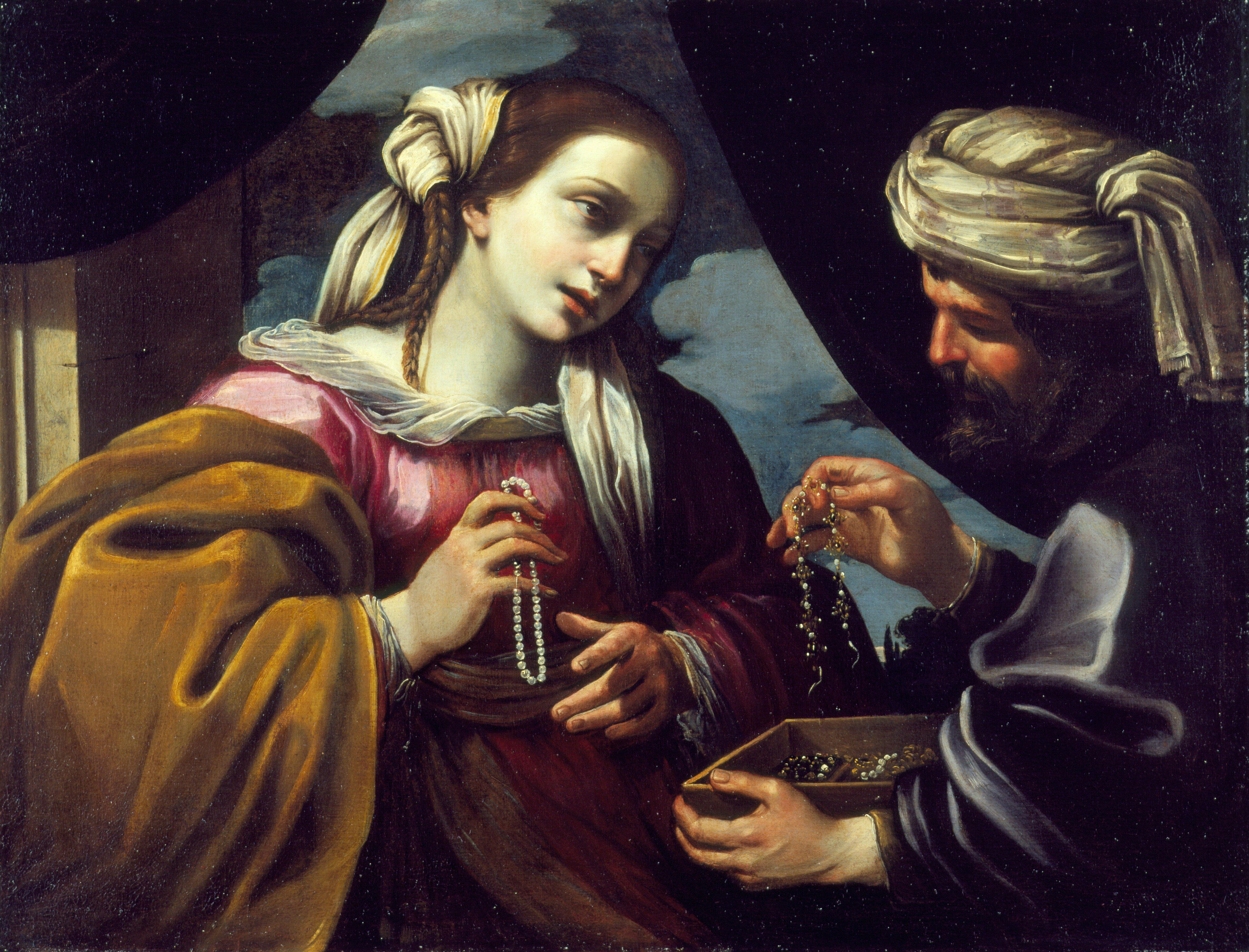
Rebeca and Eleazar

Pietro Desani (November 18, 1595 – 1647) was an Italian painter of the Baroque period, active mainly in Bologna and Reggio Emilia. He was a disciple of Lionello Spada. He painted a Crucifixion with the Virgin Man, Magdalen, and St. John for the Chiesa del Corpo di Cristo and St. Francis receiving Stigmata for the church of the Padri Zoccolanti. One of his pupils was Orazio Talami.
