= Leonello Spada =

Italian painter

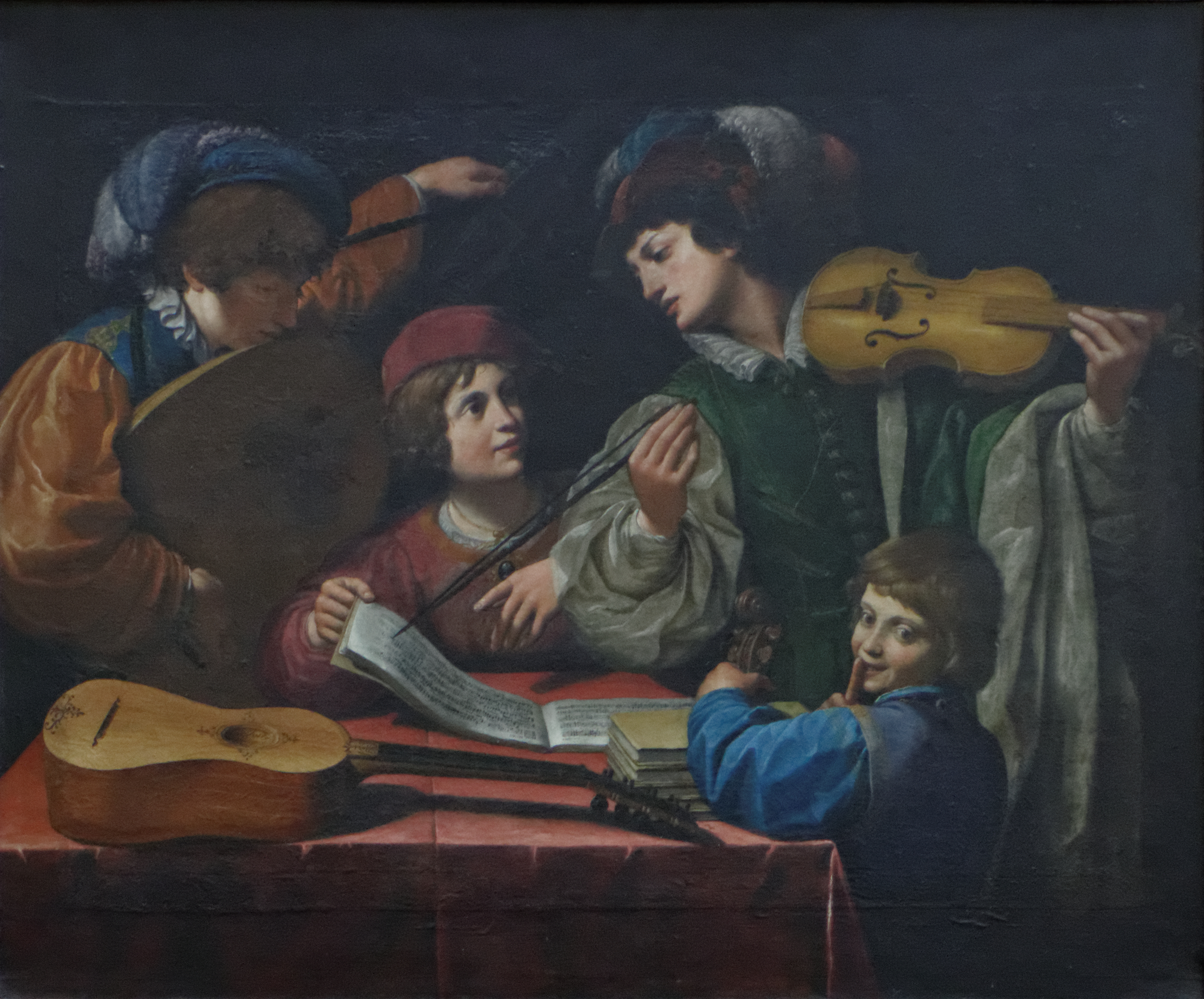
Concert, Louvre

Leonello Spada (also called Lionello Spada) (1576 – 17 May 1622) was an Italian painter of the Baroque period, active in Rome and his native city of Bologna, where he became known as one of the followers of Caravaggio.

== Biography ==
He first apprenticed with painter Cesare Baglioni. By the early 17th century, Spada was active, together with Girolamo Curti, as a member of a team specializing in decorative quadratura painting in Bologna. His early independent canvases reflect a mannerist style akin to the Flemish Denis Calvaert who resided in Bologna. In 1604 he made an unsuccessful bid for the commission to decorate the sacristy of the Basilica of Santa Maria di Loreto. By then he had already gravitated to the Carracci Academy, having contributed to the decorations for the funeral of Agostino Carracci in 1603. His earliest surviving major painting, the altarpiece of the Virgin and Saints Dominic & Francis Interceding with Christ (1604), shows that he had modeled his style on that of Ludovico Carracci. He frequently collaborated with other students of Ludovico, especially Francesco Brizio and remained in Bologna until 1607. Spada's figurative style gradually became more robust, as shown by the Miraculous Draught of Fishes (1607).

Among his pupils was Pietro Martire Armanni.

== Interaction with Caravaggio ==
Whether Spada either met or became an assistant of Caravaggio, like Manfredi, is unclear. The biographer Malvasia makes plain in his Felsina pittrice his distaste for Caravaggio, and apparently describes Spada and Caravaggio as equally "dissolute" and "precipitous"; and there are suggestions that for Caravaggio, Spada was a man "close to his heart", and perhaps not metaphorically. Malvasia also tells the story of Spada posing for Caravaggio's ‘’Death of John the Baptist’’: afraid that Spada might flee and, that without a model the painting would be incomplete, Caravaggio imprisoned him in a room until he had finished. However, it is unclear if Spada ever physically encountered Caravaggio in Rome. Spada supposedly was in Rome after 1608-9, when Caravaggio had fled to Malta. Malvasia suggests the Spada followed Caravaggio to Malta. This is possible since Spada himself painted frescoes in the Magisterial palace of Valletta in 1609-1610; but Caravaggio again had fled to Sicily by 1608, thus their overlap in Malta must have been short. The dark violence of a painting such as the Cain Killing Abel (Museo di Capodimonte) and his derivative realism Musical Concert garnered him in Bologna, the maligning appellation of "scimmia del Caravaggio" (ape of Caravaggio).

But this, as much of Spada's output, may not reflect a gathered flame of inspiration but a pale reflection, a mimicry of the harsh passion, which when linked to his Carraci upbringing leads to a weakened pastiche. Leonello Spada is known to have made many copies of other painters.

He painted a large canvas for the Basilica of San Domenico in Bologna, depicting St Dominic Burning the Books of the Heretics, (1616). The Ghiara frescoes in Reggio Emilia are perhaps his masterpiece and demonstrate a return to Carraccian models. Other works of this fruitful period include the Return of the Prodigal Son and Aeneas and Anchises (both at Louvre).

In 1617, he was commissioned by Duke Ranuccio I Farnese, to decorate the newly built Teatro Farnese for Parma. His ‘’Mystic Marriage of St Catherine’ (1621; Parma, San Sepolcro) is a late painting.

== Gallery ==
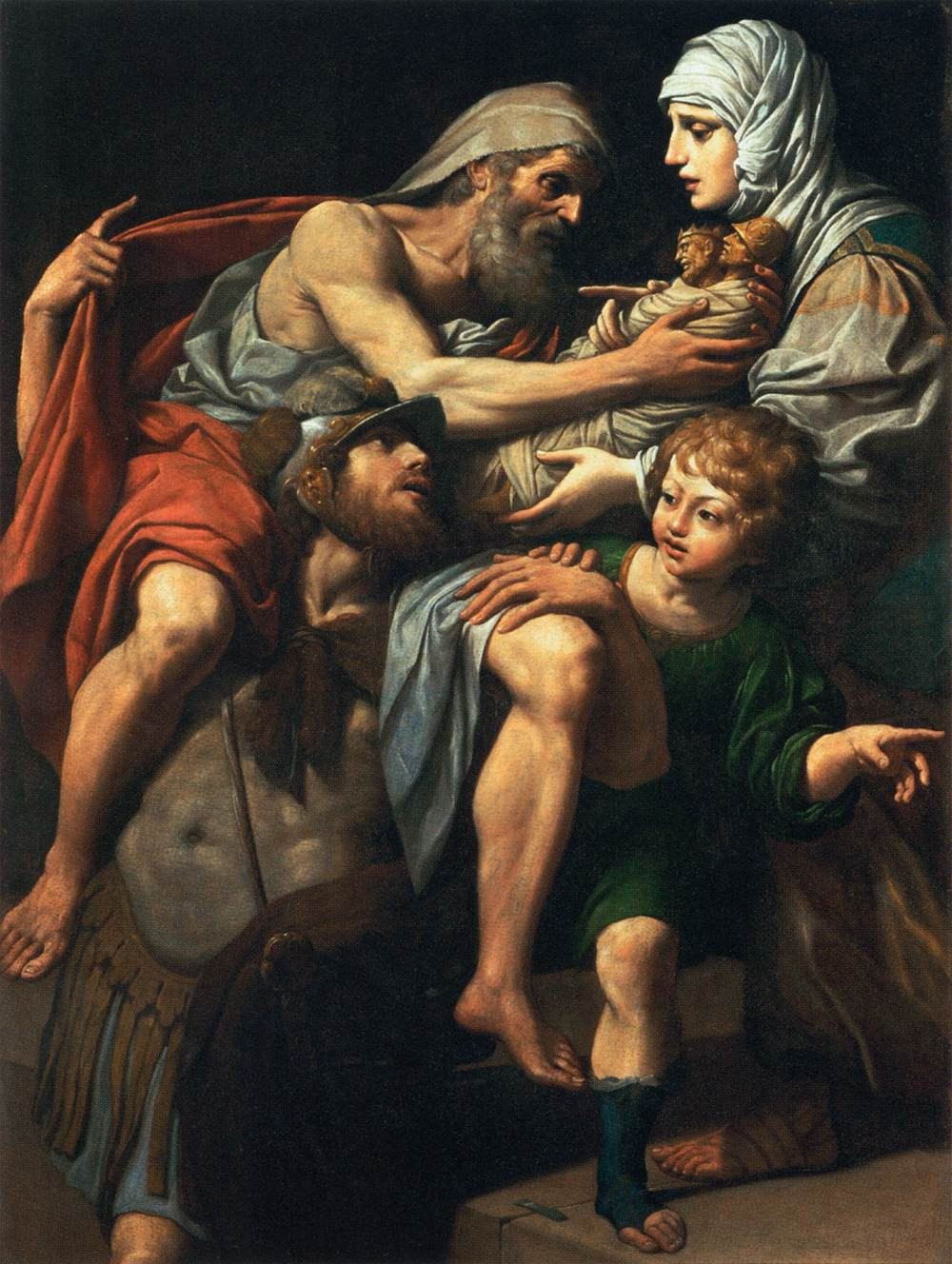
Aeneas and Anchises, Louvre

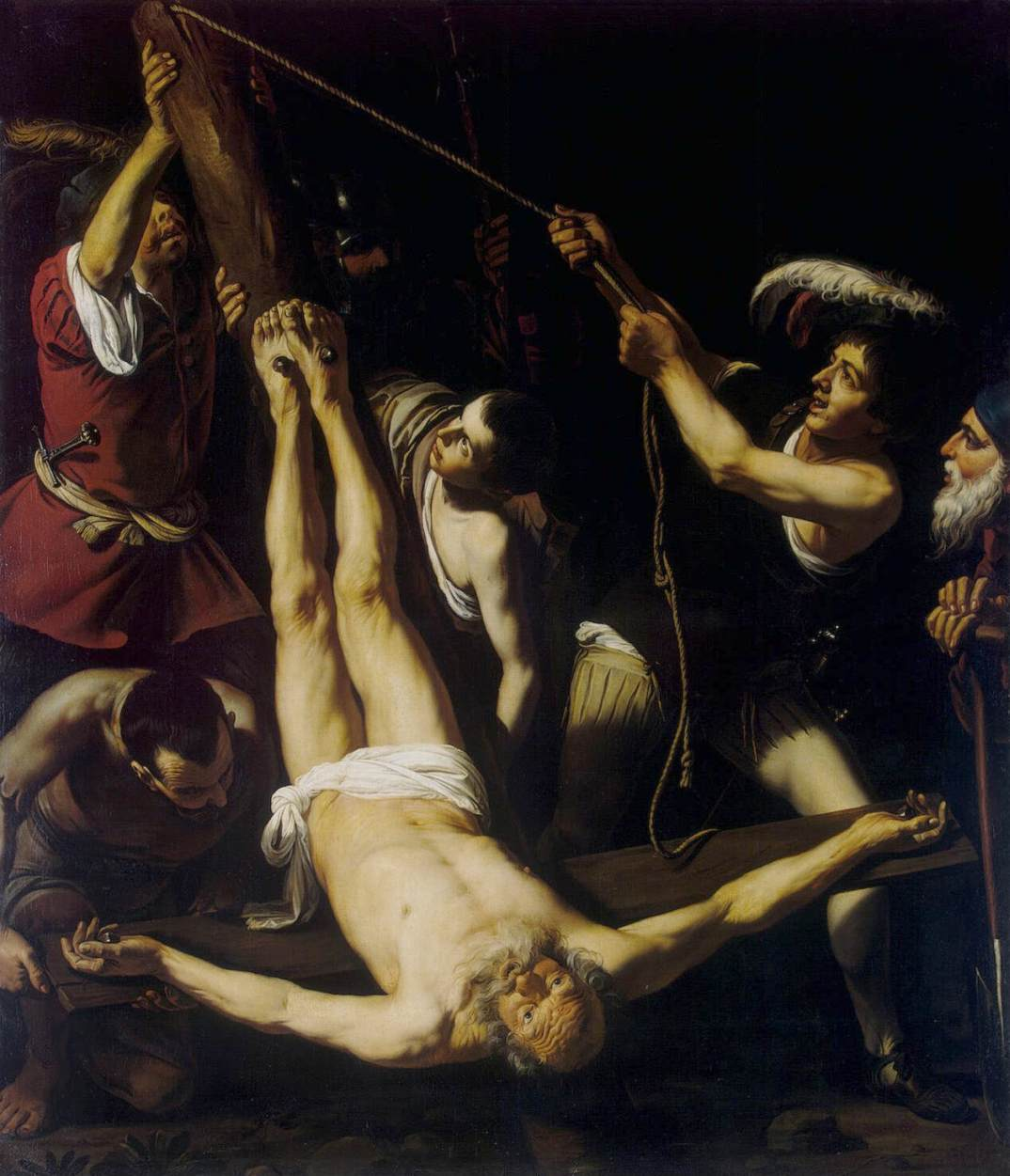
Martyrdom of Saint Peter, Hermitage

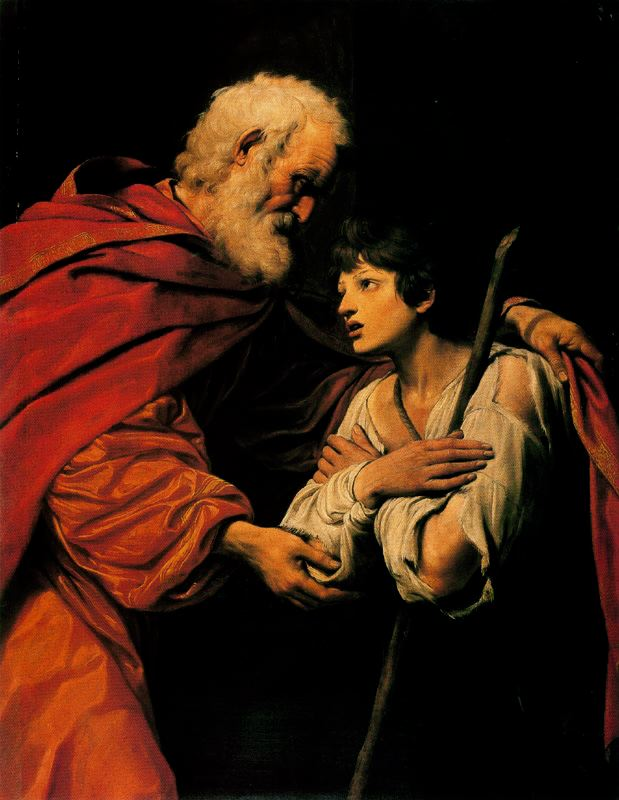
Return of the Prodigal Son, Louvre

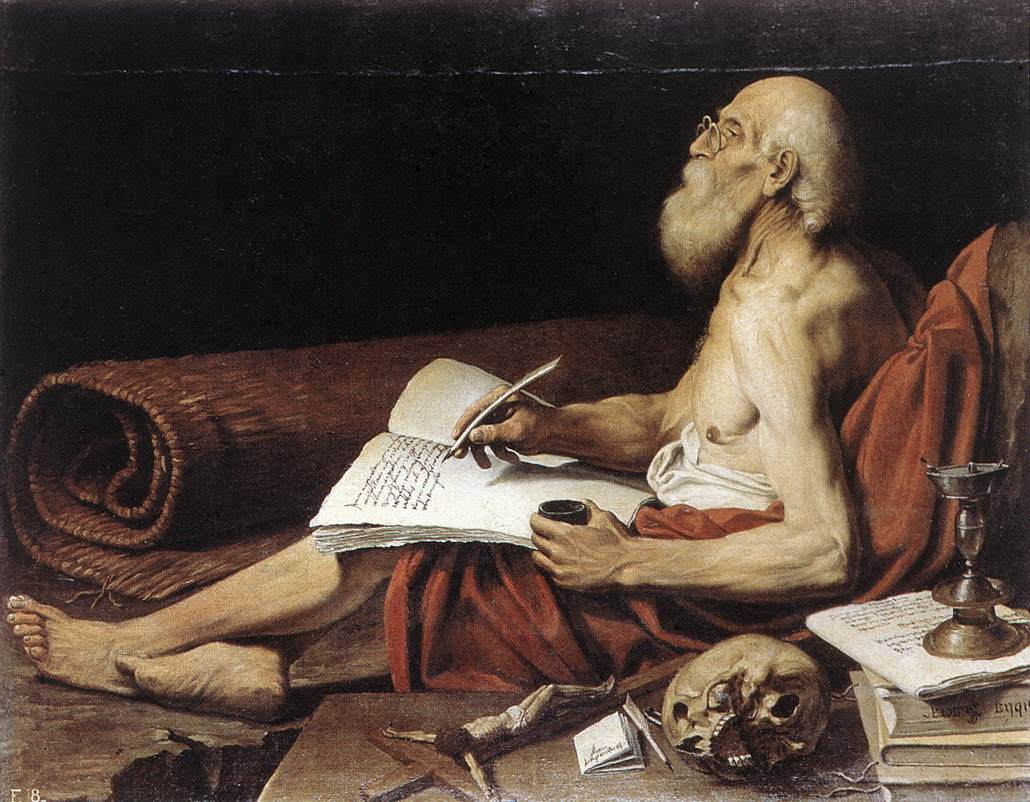
St Jerome, Galleria Nazionale d'Arte Antica

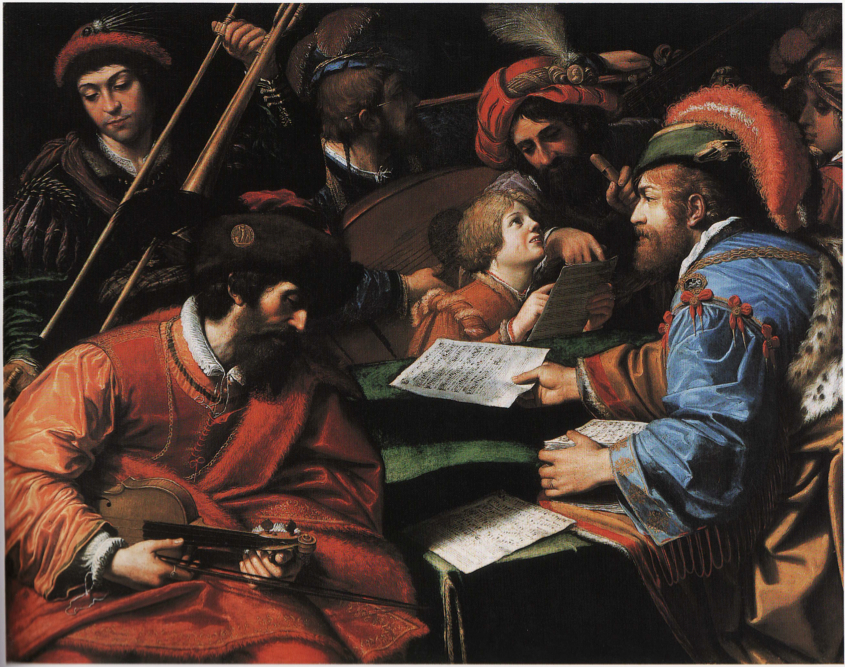
Concerto, Galleria Borghese

== Partial anthology ==
- Aeneas and Anchises (1615, Louvre)
- Saint Jerome (attributed once to Giuseppe Ribera, 1618, Museo Arte Antica, Rome)
- Abraham and Melchizedek
- Return of Prodigal Son (after 1615, Louvre)
- A Soldier (attributed 1600–1625, Philbrook Museum, Tulsa)
