= Cassola (disambiguation) =

Cassola is a town in the province of Vicenza, Veneto, Italy.

Cassola may also refer to:

- Cassola (surname), surname of Italian origin
- Cassoeula, typical winter dish popular in Northern Italy

== See also ==
- Casola (disambiguation)
- Cazzola (disambiguation)
