= Cassola (surname) =

Cassola is a surname of Italian origin. Notable people with the surname include:

- Arnold Cassola (born 1953), Maltese politician and author
- Carla Cassola (1947–2022), Italian actress
- Carlo Cassola (1917–1987), Italian novelist

== See also ==
- Casola (disambiguation)
- Cassola
- Cazzola (disambiguation)
