= Culture of Milan =

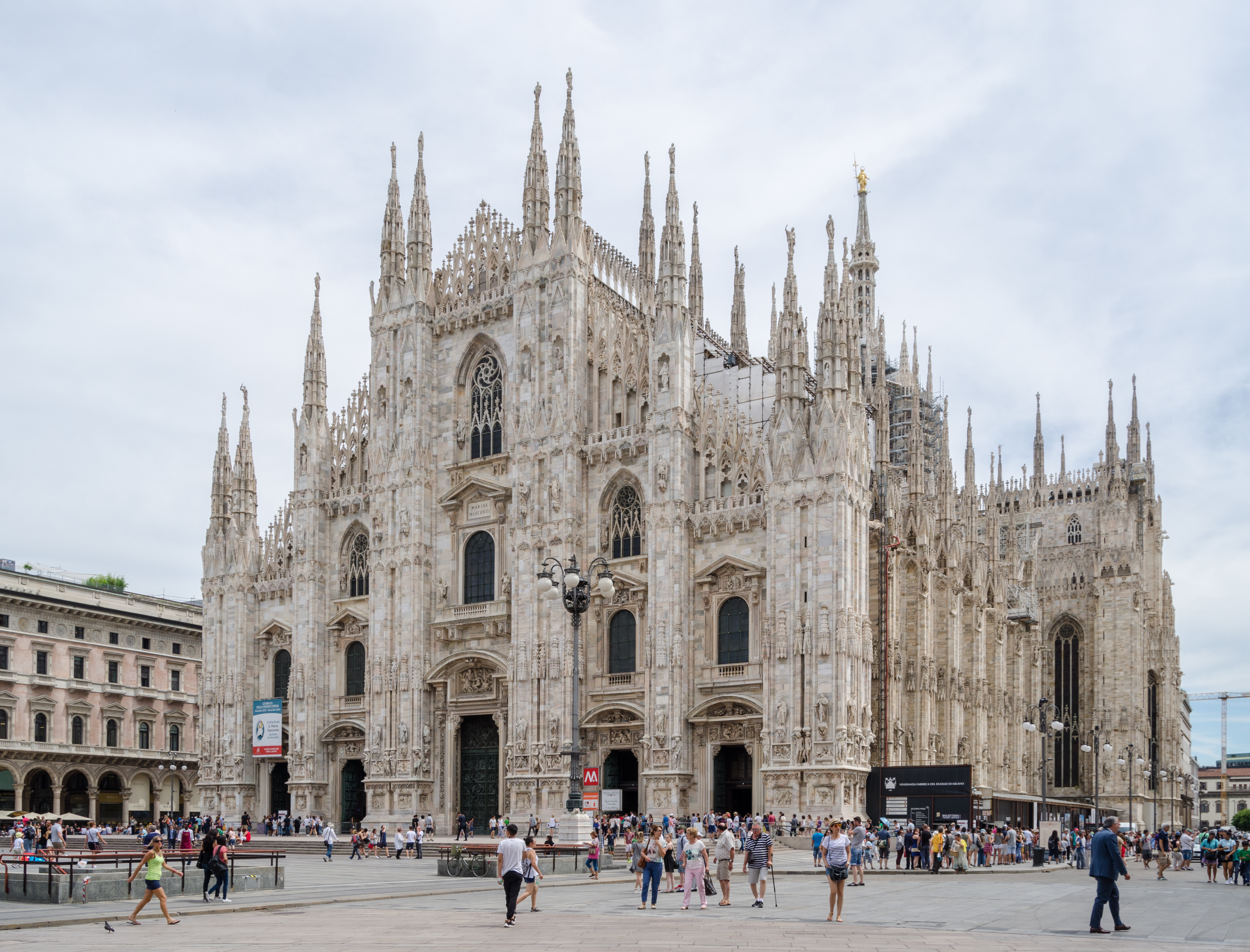
The Duomo di Milano (Milan Cathedral) is perhaps the most iconic of all Milanese cultural landmarks.

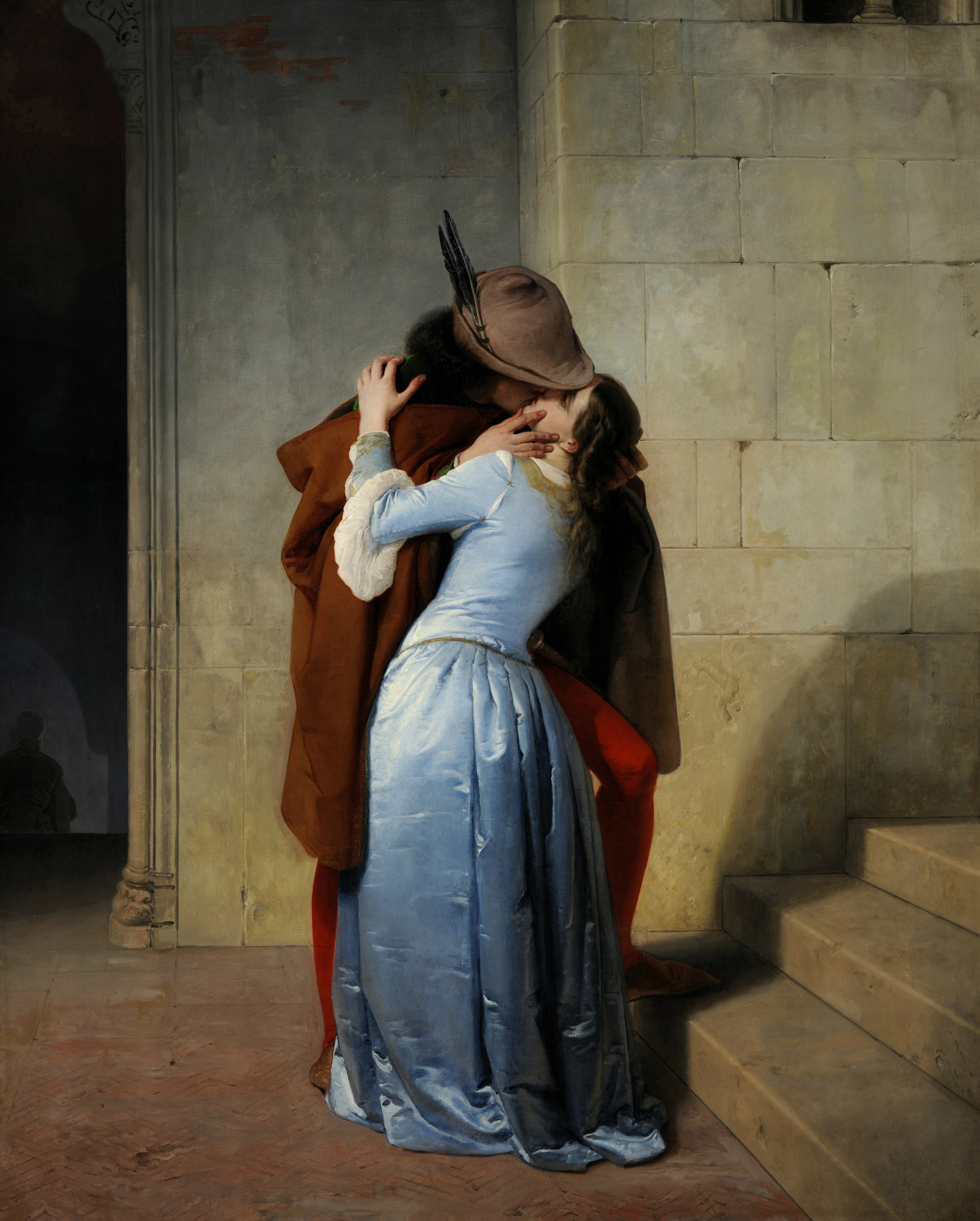
The Kiss, a famous painting from the Romantic period by Francesco Hayez found in the Pinacoteca di Brera, one of the city's most prestigious and famous art galleries

Having been ruled by several countries over the centuries, Milanese culture is eclectic and borrows elements from many other countries, including Austria, Spain and France. Similarities between these places and Milan can be noticed through the language, architecture, cuisine and general culture of these countries.

In the 18th century, Austrian rule stimulated much of the city's cultural, political, social and economic life, resulting in the founding of numerous important artistic institutions, as well as contributing to the city's architecture. After the unification of Italy in 1861, Milan became a major industrial and cultural centre in the new Kingdom; in the late 19th century onwards, the city held the position of the country's economic capital, whilst Rome was the seat of the government, making it the country's main political and administrative hub. In the fin-de-siècle period and the early 20th century, the city became an important architectural centre (highly influenced by Art Nouveau, additionally highlighted by the 1906 World Exposition, which was held in the city), and remained a prominent city with regard to a major intellectual scene.

After World War II, Milan was highly affected by the Italian economic miracle, or il boom, and attracted a wave of immigrants from Southern Italy, who sought work in the prosperous city. By then an important centre for finance and design, the metropolis grew into a major fashion capital in the 1980s. In the 2000s Milan still remains one of the country's most important cultural, media and economic centres; its prominence is extended worldwide, and it is recognised as an Alpha global city. The city additionally hosted the Expo 2015. Milan is traditionally referred to as the moral capital of Italy, especially due to the city's perceived work ethic.

Milan today is an international city, with numerous museums and cultural icons. Such include the Duomo di Milano (Milan Cathedral), the Castello Sforzesco, the Galleria Vittorio Emanuele II and the Teatro alla Scala, to name but a few. The city has been home to numerous renowned people in history, such as Giuseppe Verdi, Mario Prada, Caravaggio, Enzo Biagi and Bramante.

== Language ==
In addition to Italian, approximately a third of the population of western Lombardy can speak the Western Lombard language, also known as Insubric. In Milan, some natives of the city can speak the traditional Milanese language—that is to say the urban variety of Western Lombard, which is not to be confused with the Milanese-influenced regional variety of the Italian language.

In Italian-speaking contexts, Milanese is (like the other non-Italian language varieties spoken within the borders of the Italian Republic) generically called a "dialect". This is often incorrectly understood to mean a dialect of Italian, which actually is not the case. Milanese and Italian are distinct Romance languages and are not mutually intelligible. Milanese is Western Lombard variety and is intelligible to speakers of other neighbouring Western Lombard varieties. It should not be confused with the Milanese dialect of Italian, or with Western Lombard as a whole, which is sometimes referred to as "Milanese".

Like other dialects of Western Lombard, Milanese is a Romance language, related to French, Romansh, and Italian.

Dictionaries, grammar books, literature and a recent translation of the Gospels are available in Milanese.

== People ==
Throughout history, Milan has boasted numerous people of great influence who came from or resided in the city. Renowned Milanese artists include Caravaggio, Bramante, Bramantino and Francesco Hayez. Well-known historical figures include Saint Charles Borromeo, Saint Ambrose, Saint Augustine, Beatrice d'Este and Ludovico Sforza. Milanese politicians include Silvio Berlusconi, Letizia Moratti and Bettino Craxi. The major composers, musicians and literary figures from Milan are people such as Alessandro Manzoni, Mina and Giuseppe Verdi, and fashion designers and people of the media include Giorgio Armani, Mario Prada and Mike Bongiorno.

== Architecture ==
=== Roman and early Christian monuments ===
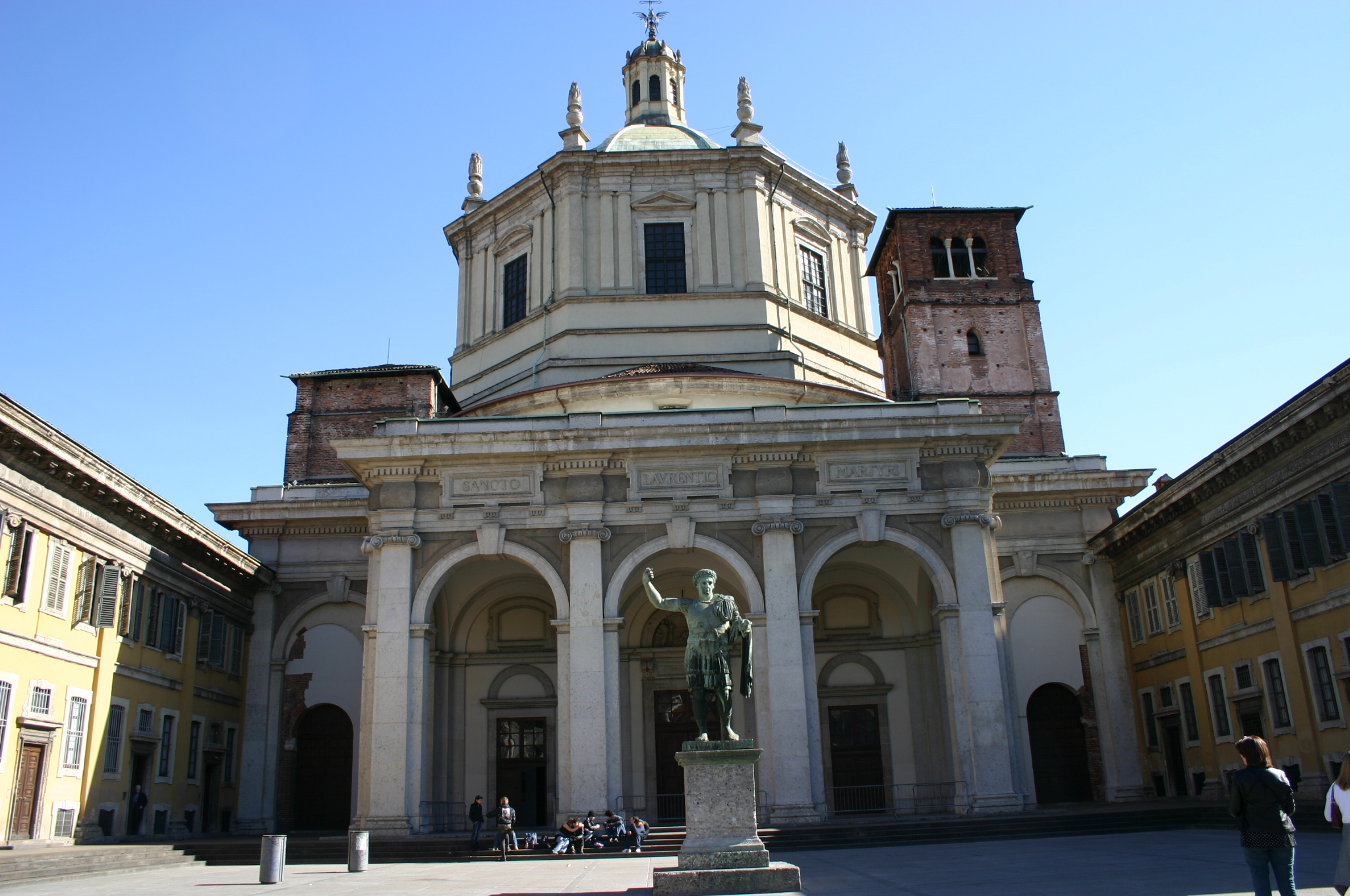
The church of San Lorenzo before the colonnade

Few significant works of art have survived from the Roman era in Lombardy and the adjacent areas. Though the Roman Empire played an important role in the city's administration, artifacts of the Great Migrations and the Roman Germanic invasions were largely destroyed. Archaeological research in recent decades has uncovered a number of ancient structures, such as city walls, the ruins of the public bath, and the ruins of the amphitheatre.

More remains of the culture of late Roman Empire, but they have actually been considered the products of early Christian art. This is the age in which Ambrose was bishop of Milan. While large parts of his Basilica of Sant'Ambrogio, as it stands today, come from later periods of use, it is still fundamentally a prototype for early Christian churches. The same is true of the Basilica of San Lorenzo, the architecture of which also shows Byzantine influence.

=== Romanesque and Gothic ===
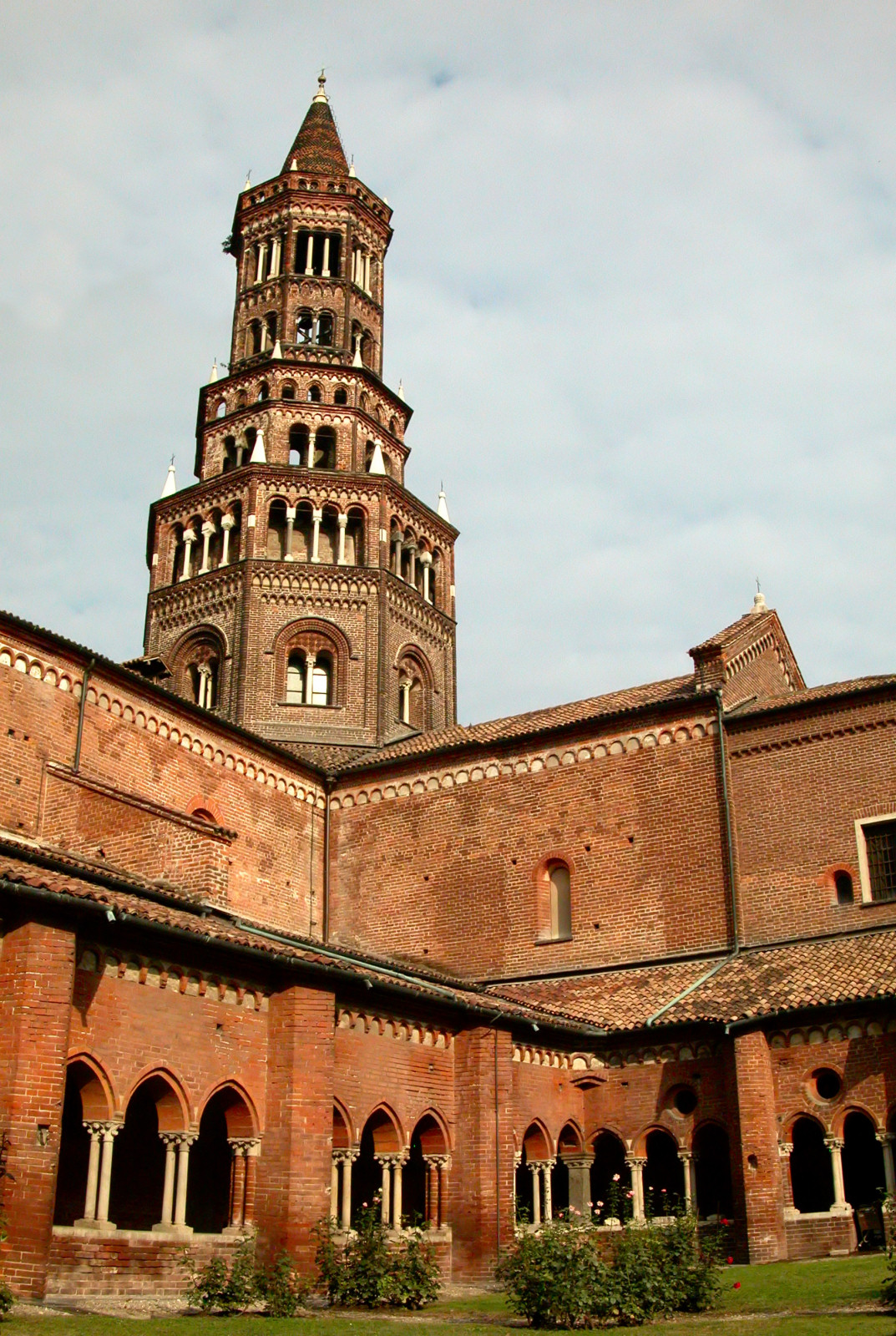
The Chiaravalle Abbey

Over the centuries, when the Romanesque and the Gothic style spread throughout Europe and Italy, Lombardy was a leading location of the style. Thus, the Lombard style of Romanesque art was created. The style was mainly diffused in Milan, Pavia, Cremona and other major cities. Milan introduced the cross-shaped basilica, in which two stems form an integral unit as in the Basilica of Sant'Ambrogio.

Further development of the Lombard style placed an ever greater emphasis on the role of the vault in the building structure, and with it that of pillars and columns. This trend strongly influenced the development of Romanesque architecture in the rest of Europe. Very typical of this style is the square bell-tower, such as in the San Satiro. Town halls and civic residences were also built in the spirit of the Lombard style. Common features of these are the highlighting and decoration of the structural elements, and ornaments with a rich abundance of plant and animal motifs.

In addition to architecture, Lombard sculpting and fresco painting also gained importance in the Romanesque and Gothic era. This style can be observed on a number of altar and other decorations, particularly in the Milan Cathedral and its museum.

The Gothic style of architecture was established in Normandy towards the end of the 12th century by French Cistercian monks. A notable example is the Chiaravalle Abbey. Unlike in many other parts of Europe, however, it supplemented the deeply rooted Romanesque style here instead of replacing it. The basic structure and architectural elements remained, but they became more stretched out, with wider openings.

=== Renaissance ===
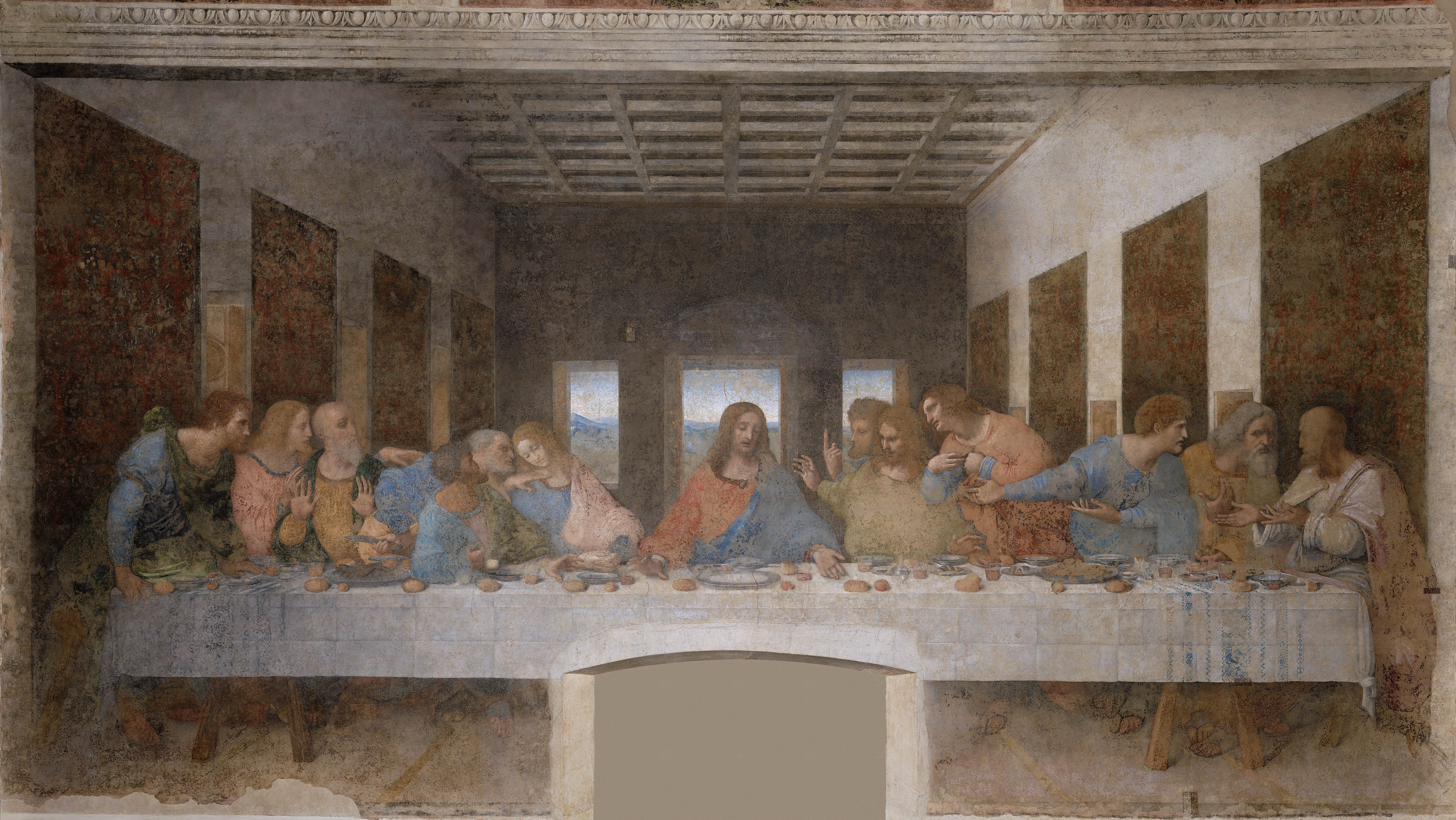
The Last Supper, Leonardo da Vinci's famous fresco in the Santa Maria delle Grazie Convent

One of the first of the early Renaissance works in the city is the Portinari Chapel at the Basilica of Sant'Eustorgio. Sculptural works of this era, which are still ornaments of the city today, are not only from Milan's artists, but also from those of Tuscany, Venice, Burgundy, Austria and Germany. They were invited to the city by the local princes and nobles. This is how, among others, Leonardo da Vinci and Bramante arrived in Milan. Bramante' works include the apse and dome of the Santa Maria delle Grazie church. His students helped spread the Renaissance style in Milan, Bergamo and Como, as well as the rest of the country.

=== Baroque ===
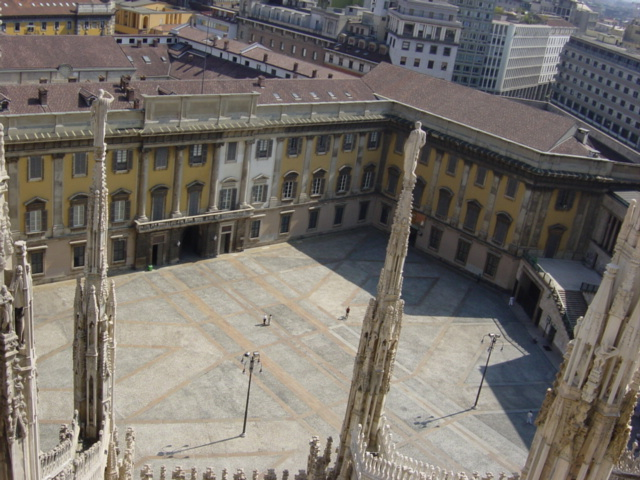
The Royal Palace of Milan

Lombard art has attained high standards in the Baroque age as well, particularly in architecture. The Baroque era in Italy is considered to have begun in 1573 with the Council of Trent. Alessi, Tibaldi, Giuseppe Meda and many others created religious and secular buildings of artistic value in Milan (Palazzo Marino, Palazzo dell'Ambrosiana, Ospedale Maggiore); but the architectural style of the era reached its true height with the craftsmanship of Francesco Maria Richini. His finest work is the Palazzo Brera.

=== 18th and 19th century ===
18th-century architecture in Milan was very different from architecture in other Italian cities, such as Tuscany and Venice. This style can be observed primarily in private residences around the countryside surrounding the city. Works by Giuseppe Piermarini however, such as the Palazzo Belgioioso or La Scala opera house belong to the Neoclassical period.

=== 20th century ===
In the early 20th century, Milan was one of the main centres of Italian futurism, with some major artists such as Gino Severini, Giacomo Balla and Umberto Boccioni. Like in several other cities across Italy, Mussolini also launched grandiose architectural projects in Milan, one example being the central railway station building. After World War II, a period of disorganized reconstruction followed that drastically altered the cityscape, with modern office buildings being raised adjacent to the medieval cathedrals. Among the most characteristic buildings in Milan is the Pirelli Tower, one of Europe's oldest skyscrapers.

==== San Siro Stables ====
San Siro Stables, also known as Scuderie De Montel were built between 1914 and 1924 by De Montel, a Jewish Milanese aristocrat. In 1938 following the application of racial laws in Italy the government took possession of the buildings. In 2006 there was a proposal to build a thermal bath over the area, but the City Council of Milan canceled the project due to lack of funds.

== Main sights ==
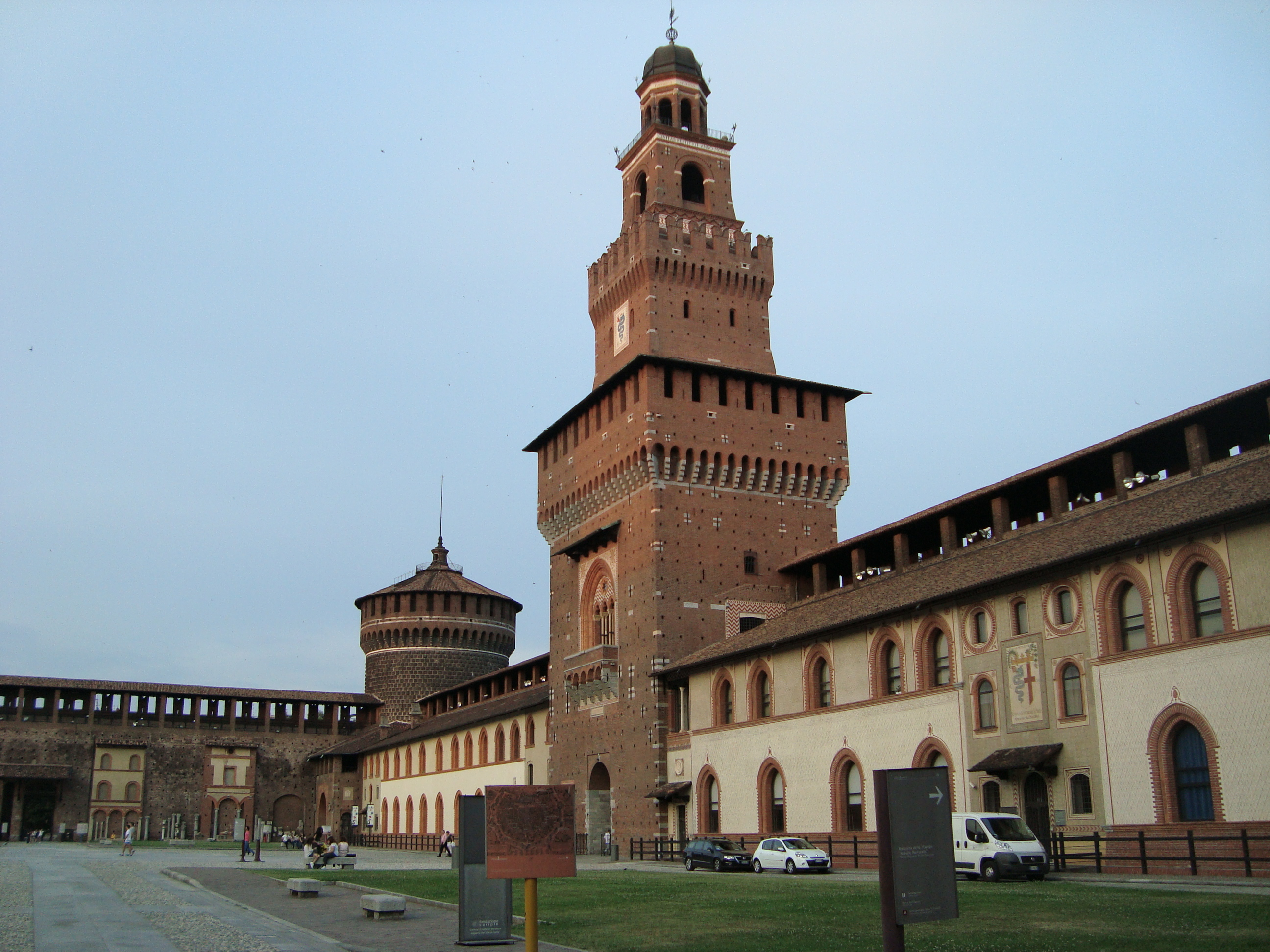
The Sforza Castle

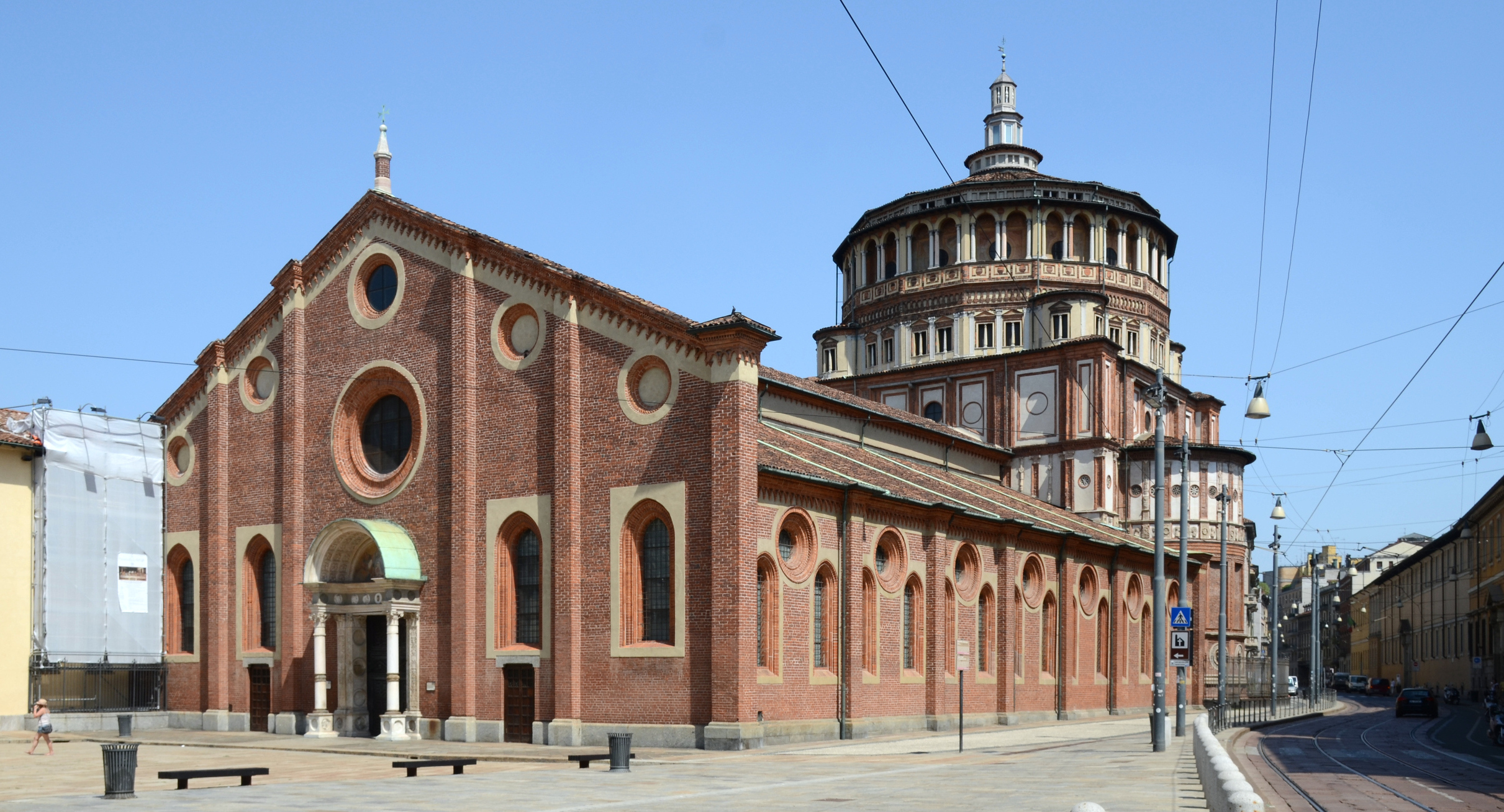
The church Santa Maria delle Grazie

Milan is one of the major artistic centres of northern Italy. Its chief landmarks include:

- The Duomo, the world's largest collection of marble statues with the widely visible golden Madonna statue on top of the spire, la Madunina (little Madonna), the symbol of Milan.
- Teatro alla Scala. Milan is also one of the most important centres in the world for Opera lirica, with its famous Teatro alla Scala (La Scala).
- The Galleria Vittorio Emanuele II, a large, covered arcade linking the Duomo's piazza with the Teatro alla Scala.
- The Castello Sforzesco and the Parco Sempione.
- The Basilica of Sant'Ambrogio
- The Palaeo-Christian Basilica of San Lorenzo
- The Biblioteca Ambrosiana, containing drawings and notebooks by Leonardo da Vinci among its vast holdings of books, manuscripts, and drawings, and is one of the main repositories of European culture. The city is also the home of the Brera Academy of Fine Arts.
- The church of Santa Maria delle Grazie, which houses one of the most famous paintings of Leonardo da Vinci, The Last Supper (L'ultima cena or Il cenacolo).
- The church of Santa Maria presso San Satiro, with a famous trompe-l'œil traditionally ascribed to Bramante
- The Cimitero Monumentale di Milano.
- The Pinacoteca di Brera, Pinacoteca Ambrosiana, Poldi Pezzoli, the Bagatti Valsecchi Museum and the Musei del Castello galleries, which host a great number of pictorial masterpieces.

== Education ==
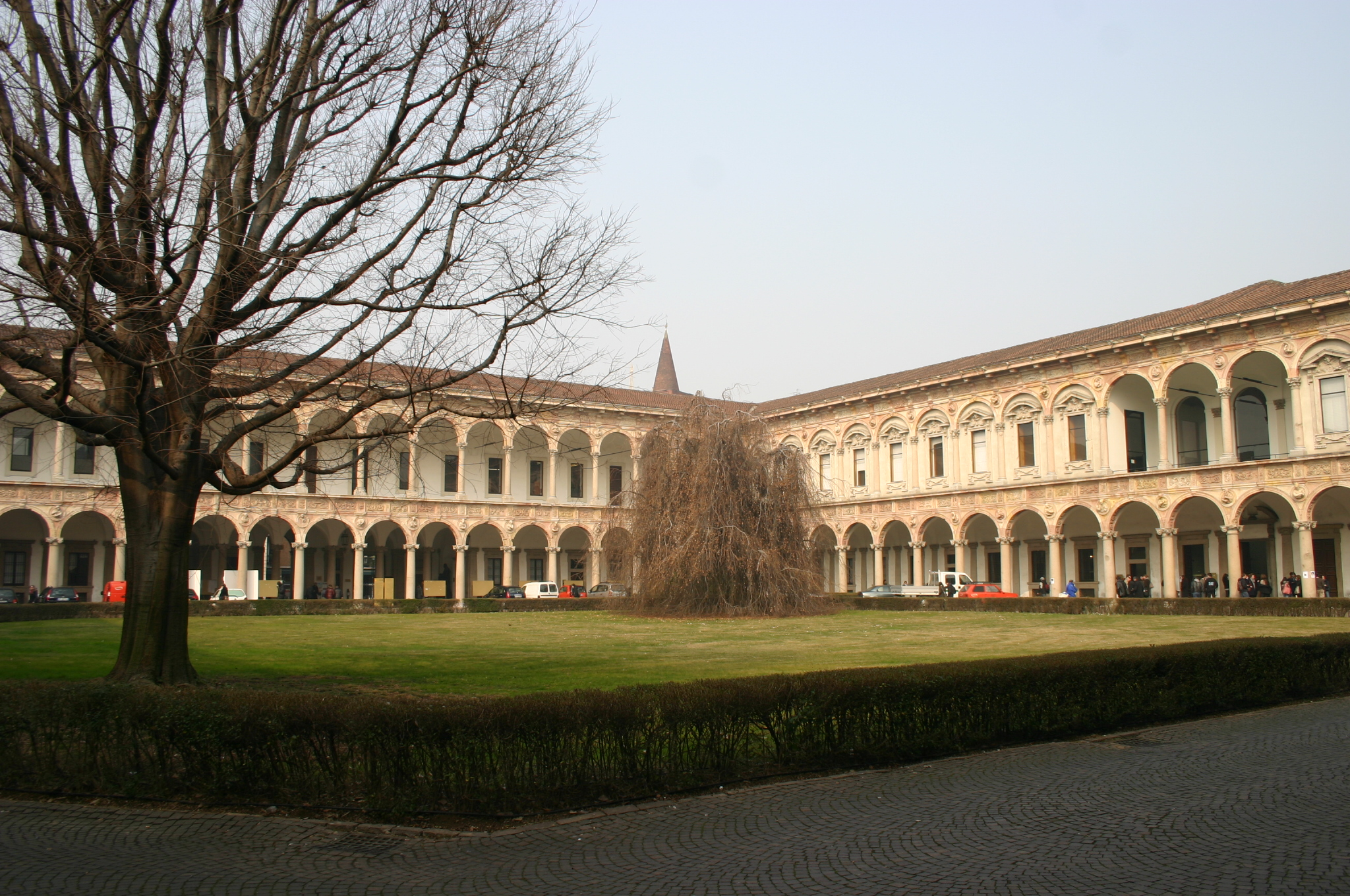
State University of Milan

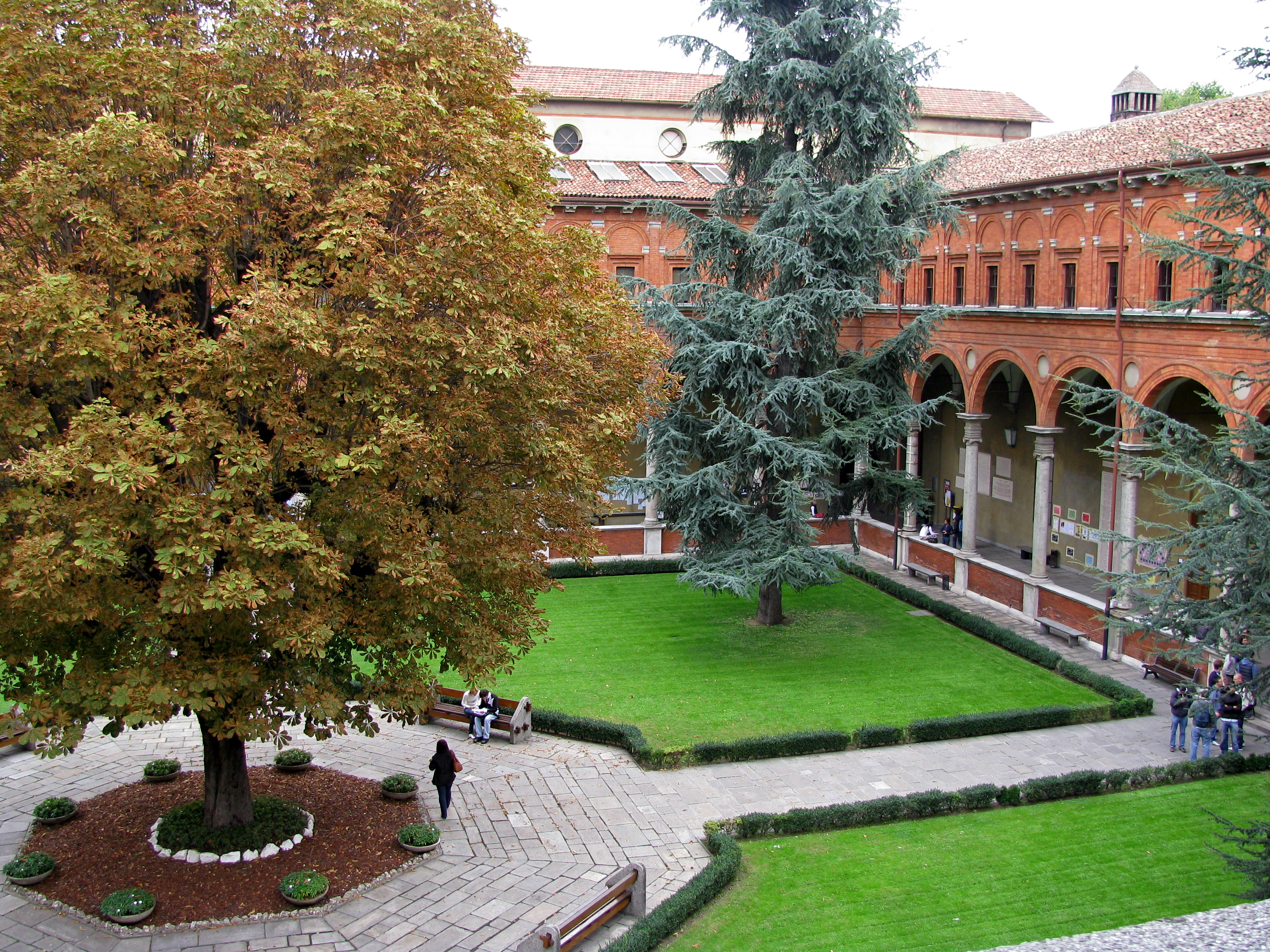
Catholic University of the Sacred Heart

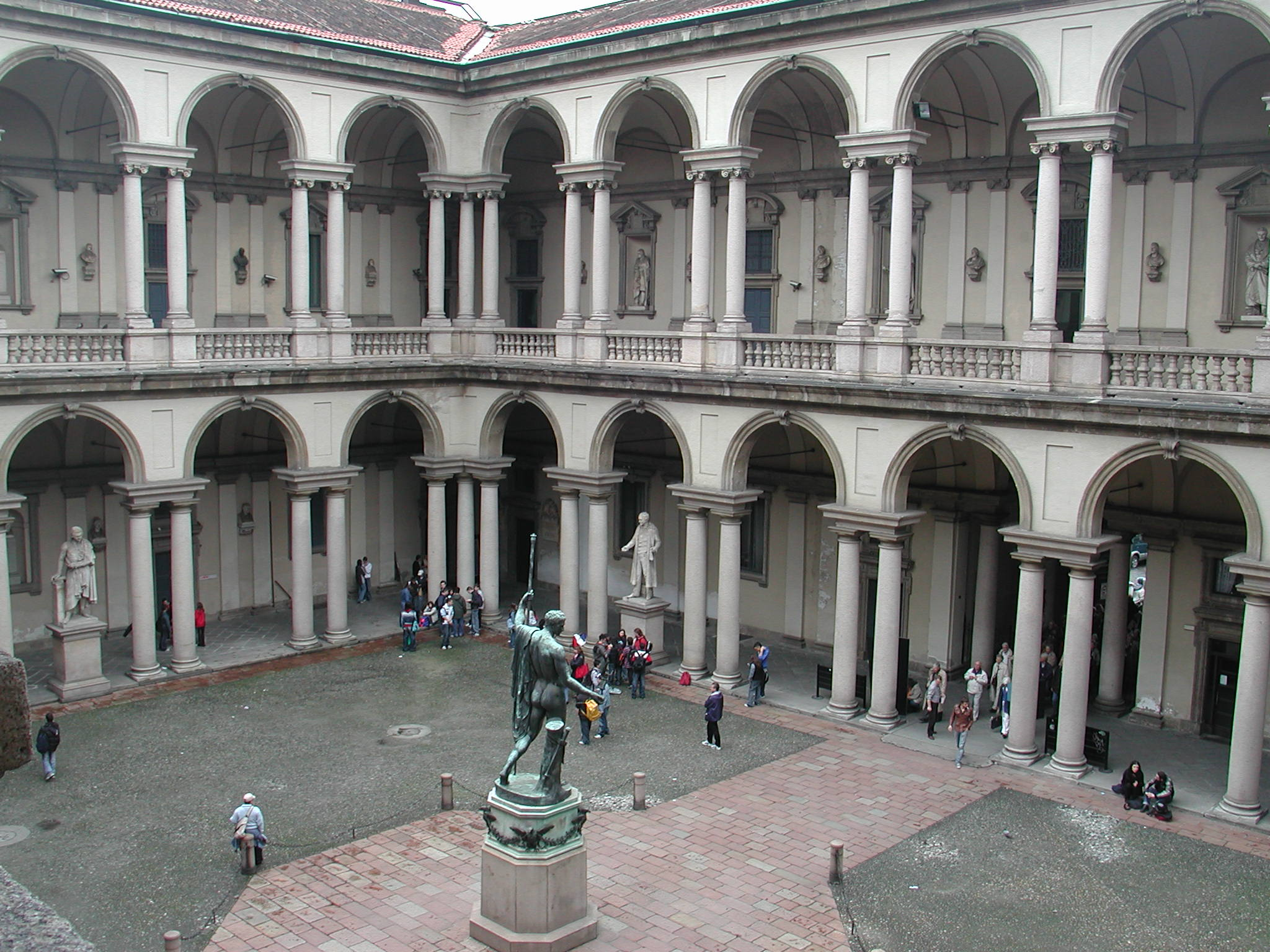
Brera Academy

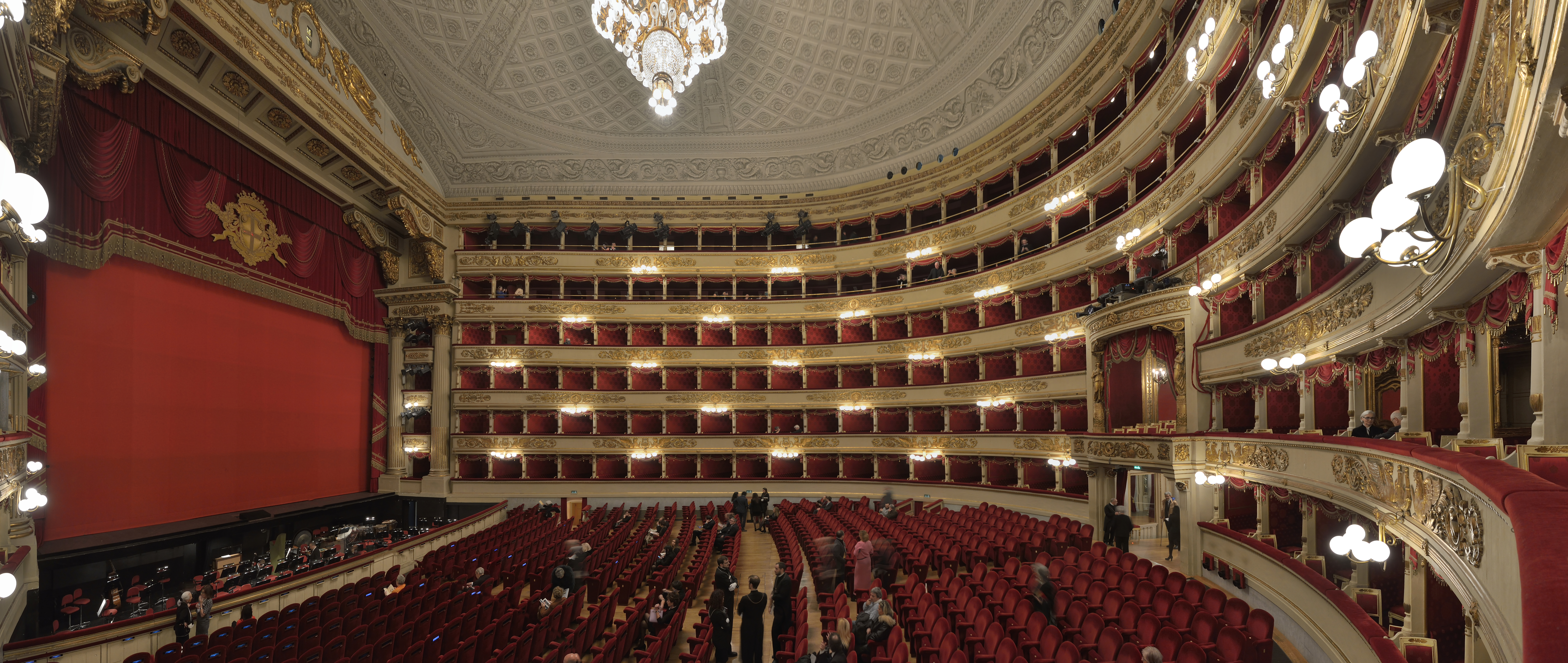
Teatro alla Scala

Milan is home to numerous universities and other institutions of higher learning:

=== State universities ===
- Università degli Studi di Milano Faculties: Agriculture, Arts and Philosophy, Law, Mathematical-Physical-Natural Sciences, Medicine and Surgery, Pharmacy, Political Science, Sport and Exercise Science, Veterinary Medicine
- University of Milan Bicocca Faculties: Economics; Educational Science; Law; Mathematics, Physics and Natural Sciences; Medicine and Surgery; Psychology; Sociology; Statistical Sciences

=== Science and medical ===
- Vita-Salute San Raffaele University
- Tethys Research Institute

=== Architecture and engineering ===
- Politecnico di Milano Statal University - 17 Departments

=== Business, economic and social ===
- Bocconi University
- Scuola Superiore di Direzione Aziendale–Bocconi
- Università Cattolica del Sacro Cuore

=== Language, art and music ===
- Accademia d’Arti e Mestieri dello Spettacolo alla Scala
- Brera Academy Academy of Fine Arts of Brera
- Università I.U.L.M.
- Nuova Accademia di Belle Arti Milano - NABA
- Conservatorio Superiore "G. Verdi" di Milano
- Civica Scuola di Musica (Municipal Music School)
- Scuola Beato Angelico

=== Actor and theatre schools ===
- Scuole Civiche di Milano Politecnico della Cultura, delle Arti e delle Lingue
- Piccolo Teatro di Milano
- Accademia dei Filodrammatici

=== Fashion and design ===
- Domus Academy, Postgraduate School of Design
- Istituto Europeo di Design
- Istituto Marangoni
- Politecnico di Milano - Facoltà del Design
- SPD Scuola Politecnica Di Design

== Literature ==
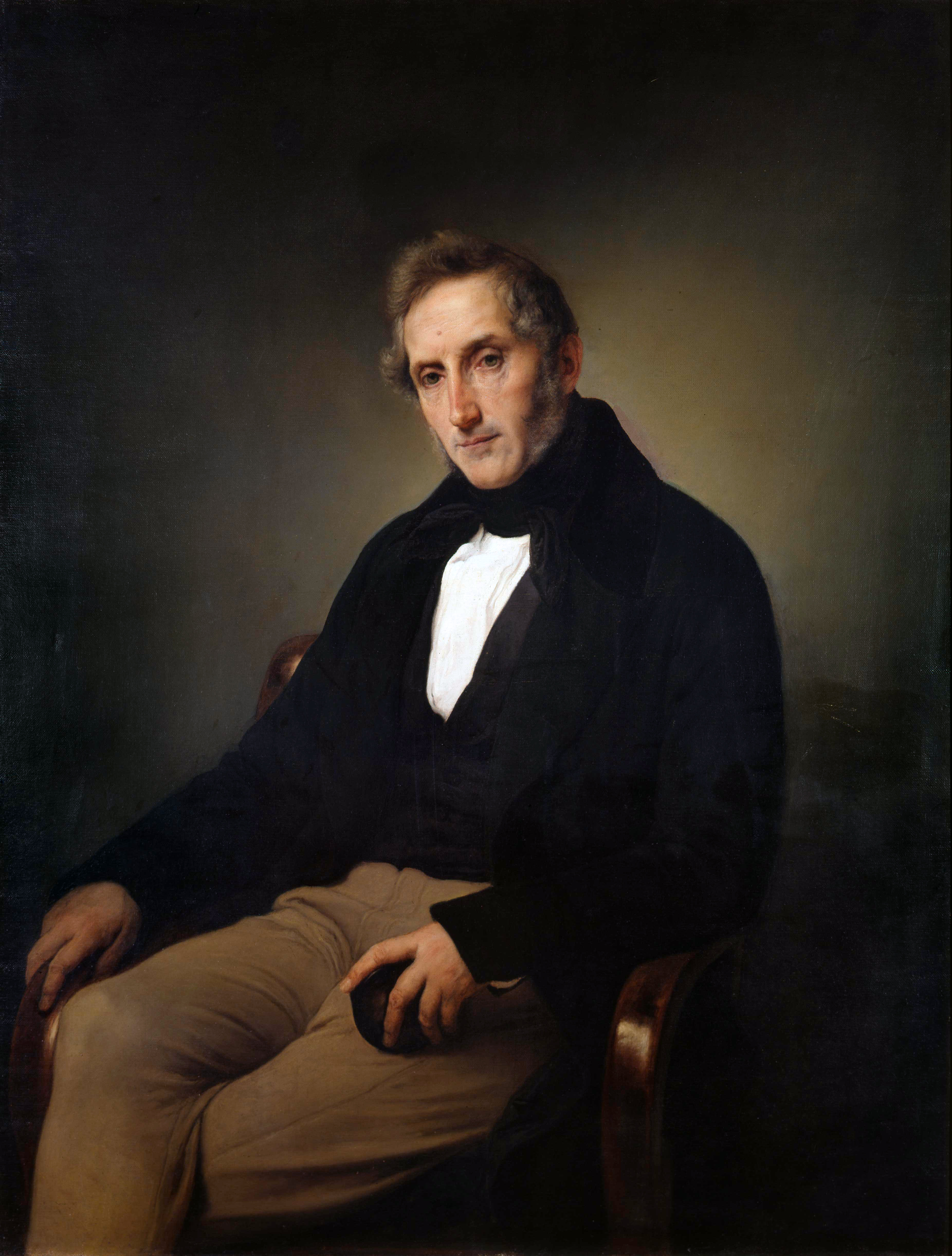
Alessandro Manzoni is famous for the novel The Betrothed (1827), generally ranked among the masterpieces of world literature. He contributed to the nationwide use of the Italian language.

In the late eighteenth century, and throughout the nineteenth century, Milan was an important centre for intellectual discussion and literary creativity. The Enlightenment found here a fertile ground. Cesare Beccaria, with his famous Dei delitti e delle pene, and Pietro Verri, with the periodical Il Caffè were able to exert a considerable influence over the new middle-class culture, thanks also to an open-minded Austrian administration. In the first years of the nineteenth century, the ideals of the Romantic movement made their impact on the cultural life of the city and its major writers debated the primacy of Classical versus Romantic poetry. Here, too, Giuseppe Parini, and Ugo Foscolo published their most important works, and were admired by younger poets as masters of ethics, as well as of literary craftsmanship. Foscolo's poem Dei sepolcri was inspired by a Napoleonic law which—against the will of many of its inhabitants—was being extended to the city.

In the third decade of the 19th century, Alessandro Manzoni wrote his novel The Betrothed, considered the manifesto of Italian Romanticism, which found in Milan its centre. The periodical Il Conciliatore published articles by Silvio Pellico, Giovanni Berchet, Ludovico di Breme, who were both Romantic in poetry and patriotic in politics.

After the Unification of Italy in 1861, Milan lost its political importance; nevertheless, it retained a sort of central position in cultural debates. New ideas and movements from other countries of Europe were accepted and discussed: thus Realism and Naturalism gave birth to an Italian movement, Verismo. The greatest verista novelist, Giovanni Verga, was born in Sicily but wrote his most important books in Milan.

== Music and performing arts ==
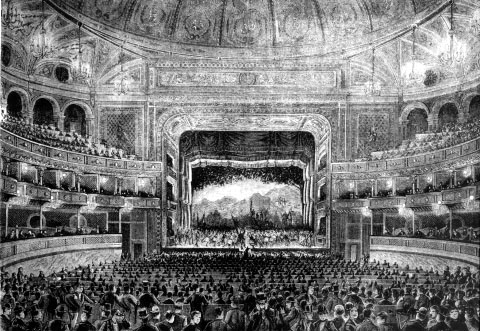
The interior of the Teatro dal Verme in ca. 1875

Milan is a major nationwide and international centre of the performing arts, most notably opera. Milan is the location of La Scala opera house, one of the most prestigious opera houses in the world, and throughout history has hosted the premieres of numerous operas, such as Nabucco by Giuseppe Verdi in 1842, La Gioconda by Amilcare Ponchielli, Madama Butterfly by Giacomo Puccini in 1904, Turandot by Giacomo Puccini in 1926, and more recently Teneke, by Fabio Vacchi in 2007, to name but a few. Other major theatres in Milan include the Teatro degli Arcimboldi, Teatro Dal Verme, Teatro Lirico (Milan) and the Teatro Regio Ducale. The city also has a renowned symphony orchestra and musical conservatory, and has been, throughout history, a major centre for musical composition: numerous famous composers and musicians such as Gioseppe Caimo, Simon Boyleau, Hoste da Reggio, Verdi, Giulio Gatti-Casazza, Paolo Cherici and Alice Edun are or were from, or call or called Milan their home. The city has also formed numerous modern ensembles and bands, such as the Dynamis Ensemble, Stormy Six and the Camerata Mediolanense have been formed.

== Science ==
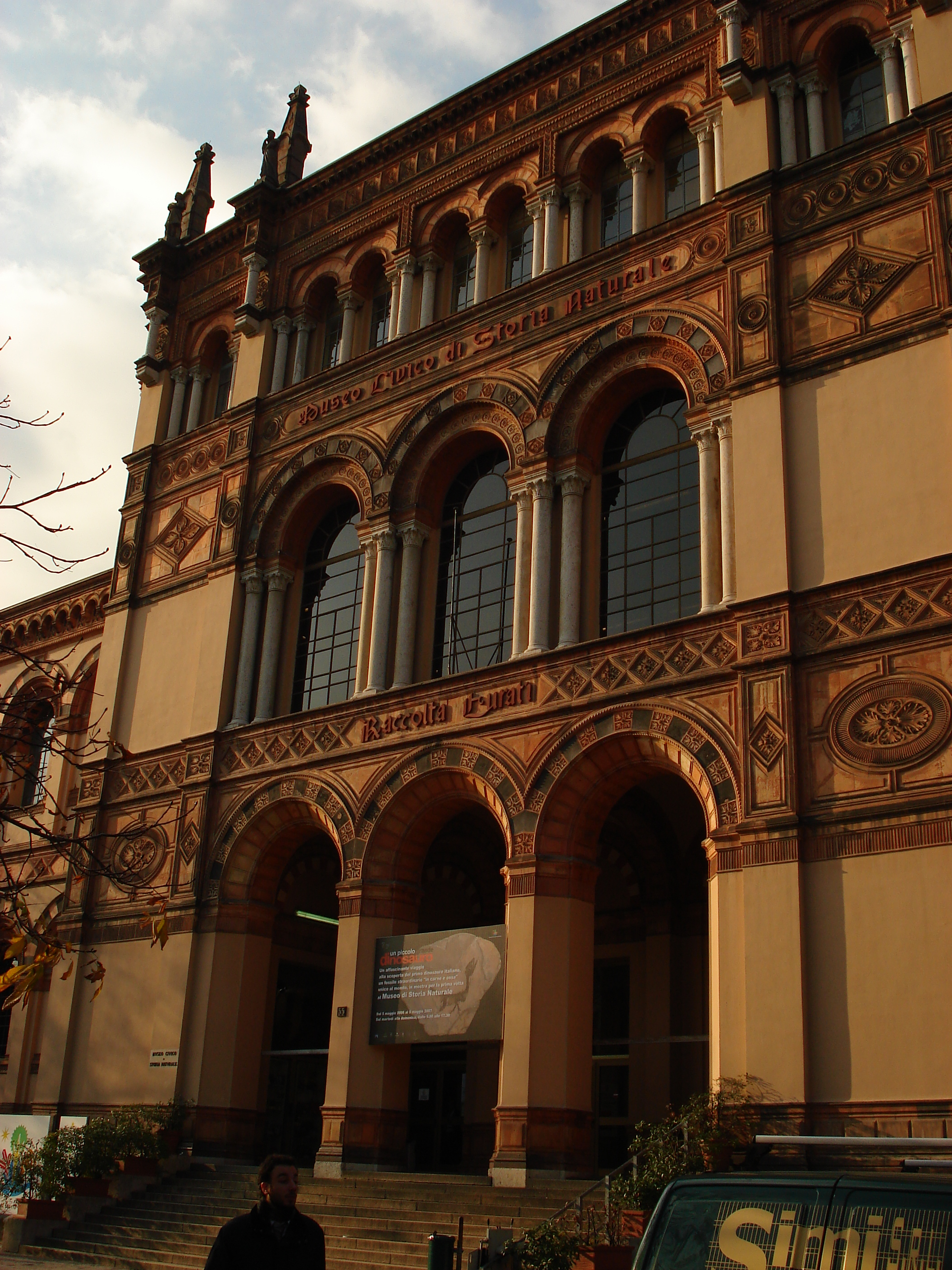
The historic Museo Civico di Storia Naturale di Milano

Milan has for a long time been an important national and European scientific centre. As one of the early-industrialised Italian cities, modern science in the Milan developed in the late-19th century and the early-20th century, when the city became one of the so-called "laboratory cities", along with Brussels, London, Paris and other major economic and industrial centres on the continent. Following serious competition from the neighbouring scientific atheneum of Pavia (where Albert Einstein spent some of his study years), Milan started to develop an advanced technological and scientific sector, and began to found numerous academies and institutions. Milan will host an interesting project called "Milano, City of Science" (Milano, Città delle Scienze in Italian), which will be held in the International Exhibition of Sempione. Science-related events which also occurred in Milan was the European Union Contest for Young Scientists, held in the city on 13 September 1997 at the Science Fair in the Fondazione Stelline. Probably the most important and ancient observatory in Milan is the Brera Astronomical Observatory, which was founded by the Jesuits in 1764, and was run by government ever since a law was passed in 1785.

== Fashion ==
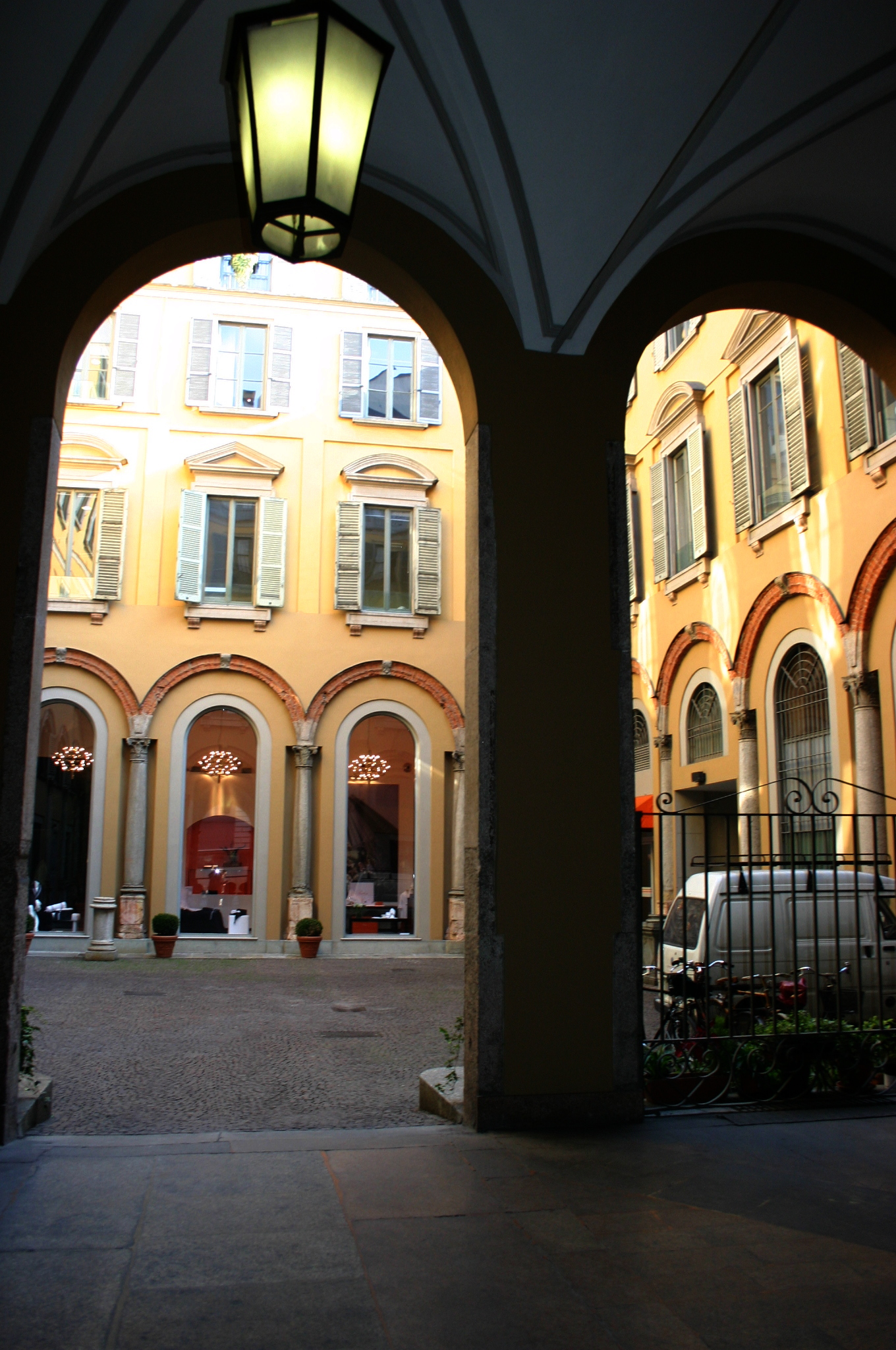
Luxury shops in the 15th century courtyard of the Palazzo Talenti, in Milan's central via Verdi

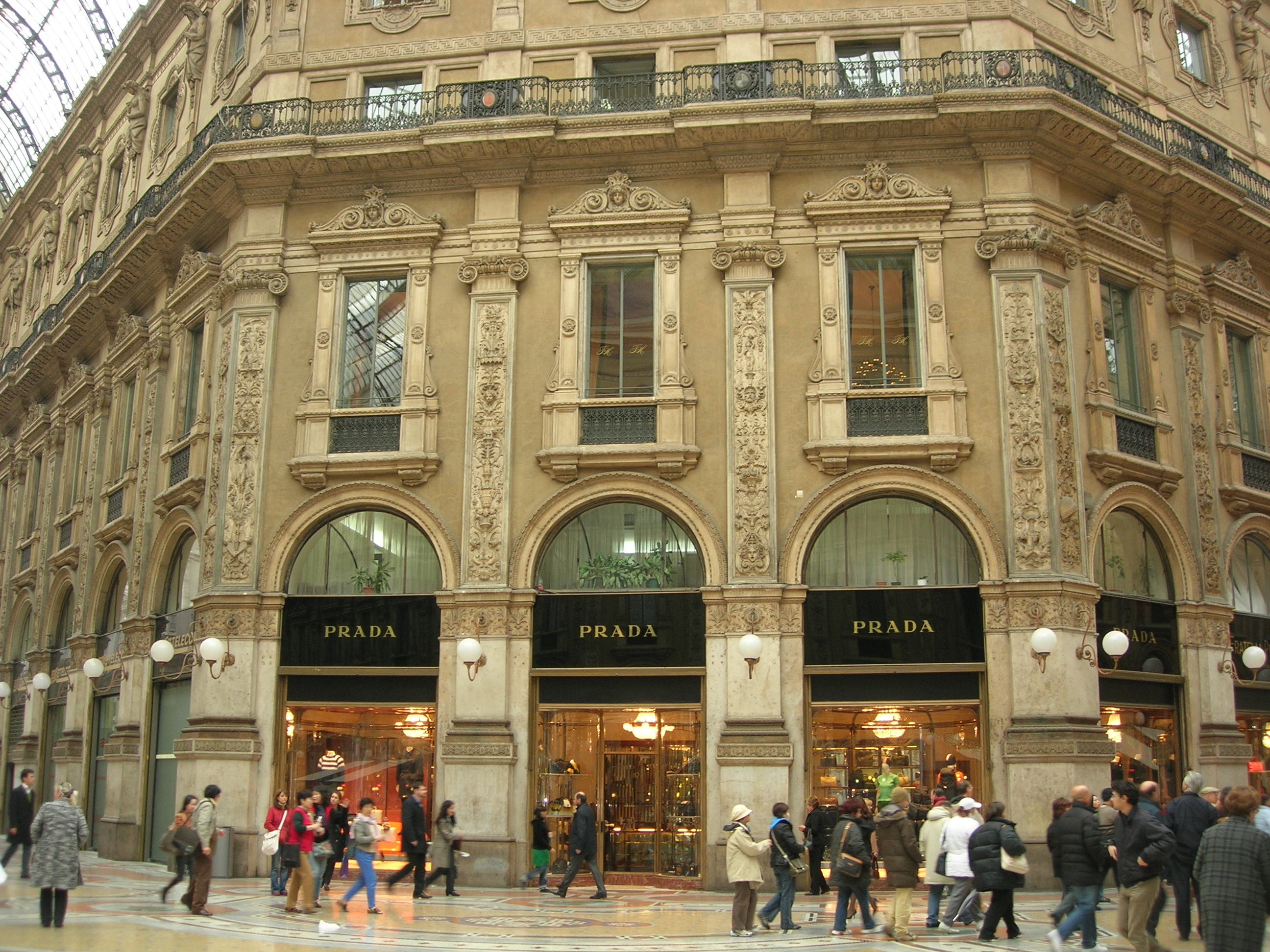
Several designer boutiques are found in the Galleria Vittorio Emanuele.

In 2009, Milan was regarded as the world fashion capital, even surpassing New York, Paris, Rome and London. Most of the major Italian fashion brands, such as Valentino, Gucci, Versace, Prada, Armani and Dolce & Gabbana (to name a few), are currently headquartered in the city. Numerous international fashion labels also operate shops in Milan, including an Abercrombie & Fitch flagship store which has become a main consumer attraction. Milan also hosts a fashion week twice a year, just like other international centres such as Paris, London, Tokyo, New York, Los Angeles and Rome. Milan's main upscale shopping streets and centres are the Via Montenapoleone fashion district and the Galleria Vittorio Emanuele, off Piazza del Duomo. Mario Prada, founder of Prada was even born here, helping to cultivate its position as a world fashion capital.

== Design ==
Milan is one of the international capitals of industrial and modern design, and is regarded as one of the world's most influential cities in such fields. The city is particularly well known for its high-quality ancient and modern furniture and industrial goods. Milan hosts the FieraMilano, Europe's biggest, and one of the world's most prestigious furniture and design fairs. Milan also hosts major design and architecture-related events and venues, such as the "Fuori Salone" and the "Salone del Mobile".

In the 1950s and 60s, being the main industrial centre of Italy and one of mainland Europe's most progressive and dynamic cities, Milan became, along with Turin, Italy's capital of post-war design and architecture. Skyscrapers, such as the Pirelli Tower and the Torre Velasca were constructed, and architects such as Bruno Munari, Lucio Fontana, Enrico Castellani and Piero Manzoni, to name a few, either lived or worked in the city.

== Media ==
Milan is the base of operations for many local and nationwide communication services and businesses, such as newspapers, magazines, and television and radio stations.

=== Newspapers ===
- Corriere della Sera
- Il Foglio
- Il Giornale
- Il Giorno
- Il Sole 24 Ore
- Il Manifesto
- La Gazzetta dello Sport
- La Padania
- Libero
- MF Milano Finanza

==== Magazines ====
- La Settimana Enigmistica
- Abitare (architecture and design monthly)
- Casabella (architecture and design monthly)
- Domus (architecture and design monthly)
- Panorama (weekly)
- Gente (weekly)

==== Radio stations ====
- R101
- RTL 102.5
- Radio 105 Network
- Virgin Radio Italia
- Radio Monte Carlo
- Radio 24
- Radio DeeJay
- Radio Classica

== Nightlife ==
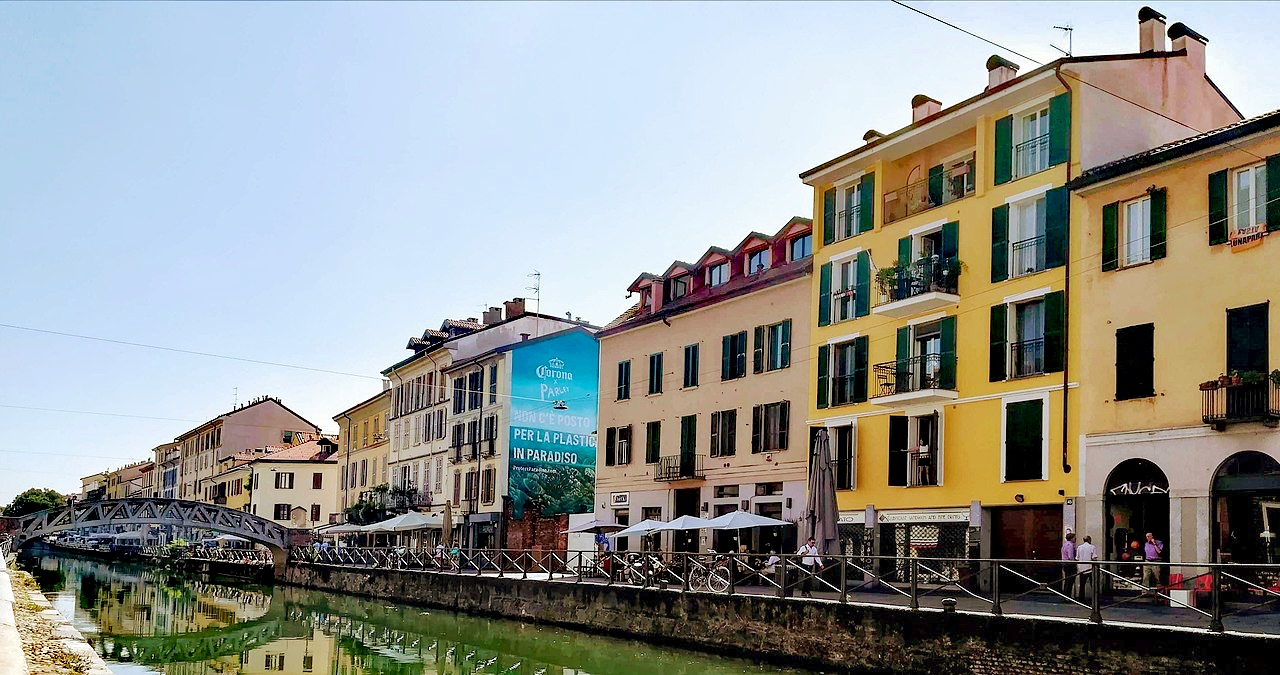
The Naviglio Grande, which hosts several shops and cafes, but is especially famous for its thriving night-time clubbing and discothèque scene.

Milan is a renowned city in Europe for its nightlife. The city is particularly well known for its c. 6pm "Happy Hour" - that is, a time in which hotels, restaurants and clubs are filled with people attending them for an aperitif (aperitivo), which is usually a light snack and a drink, after which, the traditional Italian "passegiata" is held, which is a social event in which some people promenade the streets, chatting with friends or window shopping. The "Milanese nightlife" spans from about 11 o'clock until 4 in the morning, and is usually held in the city's plethora of discothèques, clubs, restaurants and jazz venues. The most popular nightlife areas include the Brera district, where several modern nightclubs and bars can be found, the area around the Navigli, once the city's old industrial canals, but today a youthful nightlife area and the famous Leoncavallo, just near to the Porta Ticinese. Apart from the specifically designed nightclubs and discos, the Centri sociali, or social centres, are very popular with adolescents, since they are relatively inexpensive, and host a variety of entertainment activities, from heavy rock music, to light 1960s pop and cinematic venues. Milan's clubs and night-time musical venues are usually concentrated around jazz and rock music. Usually, nightclubs are at their busiest on Saturday evenings, and at their least (and in some cases, shut) on Mondays.

== Festivity ==
=== Holidays ===
- March 18-March 22: Commemoration of the 1848 revolution or the five Days of Milan.
- April 25: Milan's liberation from German occupation during World War II.
- December 7: Feast of Saint Ambrose (Festa di Sant'Ambrogio).
- December 12: Commemoration of the Piazza Fontana bombing.

=== Events and decorations ===
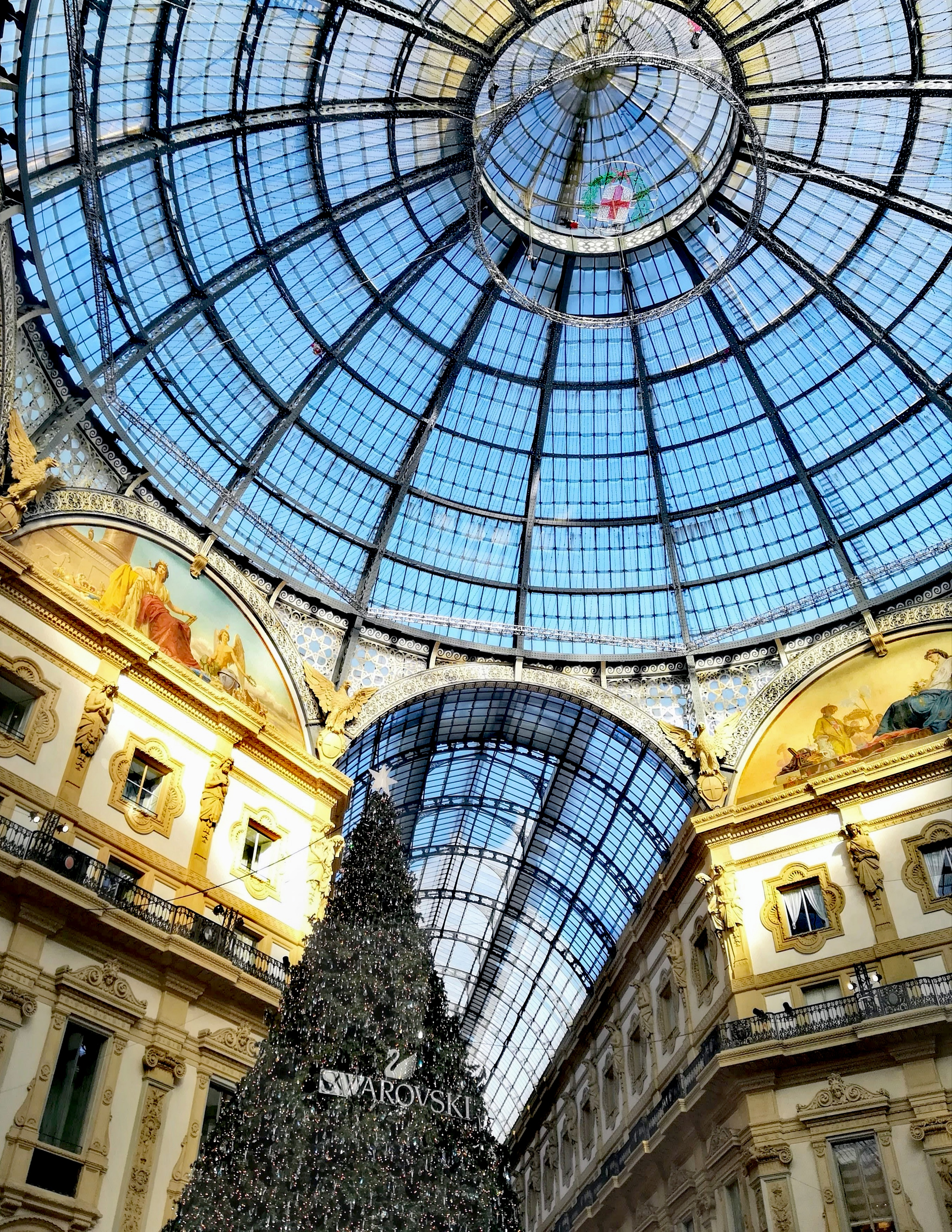
The Galleria Vittorio Emanuele's dome at Christmas time; from early December until the 7 January, all of Milan's public spaces are decorated with lights, Christmas trees, nativity scenes and other forms of decorations.

There are several important and/or symbolic events in Milan during the year. On 6 January, there is the "Corteo dei Magi", an annual epiphany procession which goes from the church of Sant'Eustorgio all the way to the Piazza del Duomo and the city's Cathedral. Other events include the "Fiera di Senigalla", a weekly traditional fair held on Saturdays, selling different objects, such as bicycles, antiques, books and also different objects from around the world, reflecting Milan's multi-ethnic society, along the Darsena or the Brera Antique Market (Mercato dell'Antiquariato di Brera), which sells different antiquaries, jewels, local produce, furnishings or vintage objects held in the Brera district. In February, the Chinese New Year is also commonly celebrated in Milan's Chinese district, with a colourful festival. In April, Milan hosts its main design fair in the Piazza XXIV Maggio, the "Fuori Salone", and in other times of the year a prestigious fashion week twice a year, the "Milano Jazzin' Festival", in which several local and international Blues, Jazz and pop singers re-unite in the Civic Arena, and the Milan Food Week, in which the city's gastronomical history is celebrated, the Milano in Sport week, and the Milan Film Festival, held in the Piccolo Teatro on the Via Dante celebrating Italian and foreign film and motion pictures.

Christmas time is usually full of events in Milan, including the Oh Bej, Oh Bej market, one of the city's oldest selling traditional produce, objects and food. The city is renowned for its Christmas lights, which decorate the city during the Christmas period until 7 January. All the city's public buildings, streets, squares and most of the shops are decorated with traditional lights and similar decorations. In 2007, however, the Milanese complained because they believed that the public spending on Christmas lights (€1 million) was too much for what they considered were not as "designer-style" as those of Turin.

== Religion ==
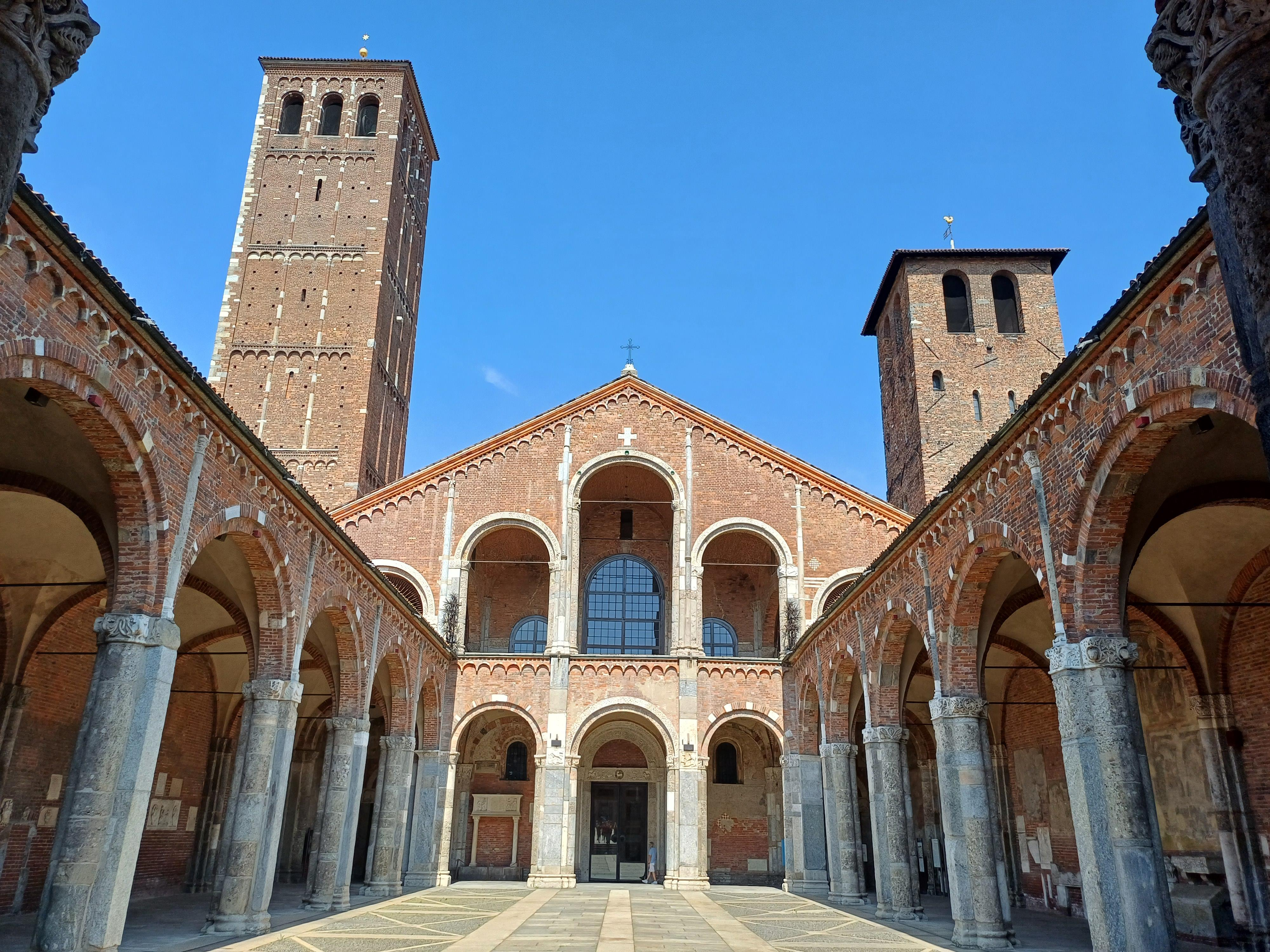
The Basilica of Sant'Ambrogio

Milan's population, like that of Italy as a whole, is overwhelmingly Catholic. It is the seat of the Roman Catholic Archdiocese of Milan, and in 2004, 95.16% of the population were Roman Catholic. Other religions practised include: Orthodox Churches, Buddhism, Judaism, Islam and Protestantism.

=== Ambrosian rite ===
Milan has its own historic Catholic rite known as the Ambrosian Rite (Italian: Rito ambrosiano). It varies slightly from the typical Catholic rite (the Roman, used in all other western regions), with some differences in the liturgy and mass celebrations, and in the calendar (for example, the date for the beginning of lent is celebrated some days after the common date, so the carnival has different date). The Ambrosian rite is also practiced in other surrounding locations in Lombardy and in the Swiss canton of Ticino.

Another important difference concerns the liturgical music. The Gregorian chant was completely unused in Milan and surrounding areas, because the official one was its own Ambrosian chant, definitively established by the Council of Trent (1545–1563) and earlier than the Gregorian. To preserve this music there has developed the unique schola cantorum, a college, and an Institute called PIAMS (Pontifical Ambrosian Institute of Sacred Music), in partnership with the Pontifical Institute of Sacred Music (PIMS) in Rome.

== Cuisine ==
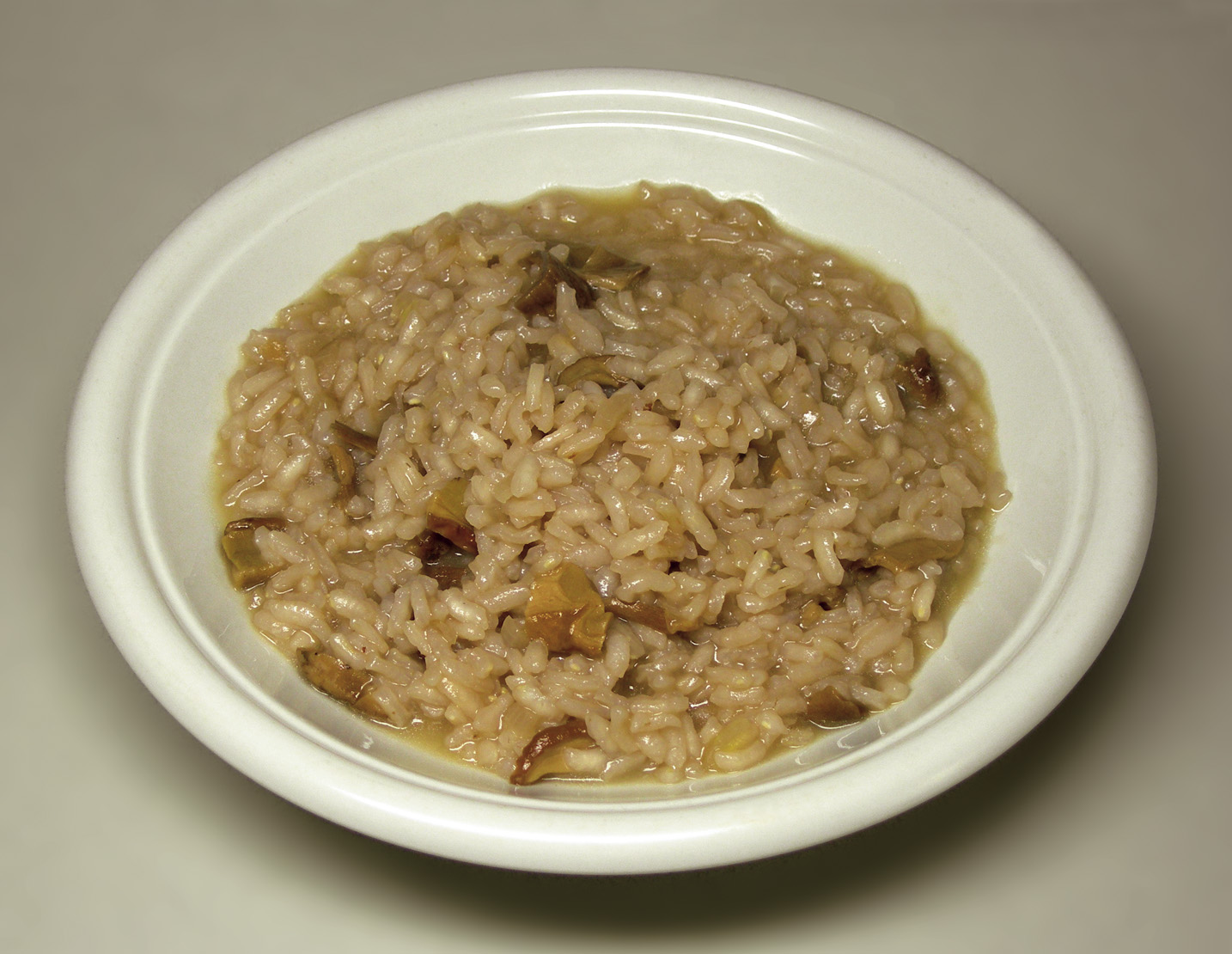
Risotto alla Milanese, a typical Milanese meal

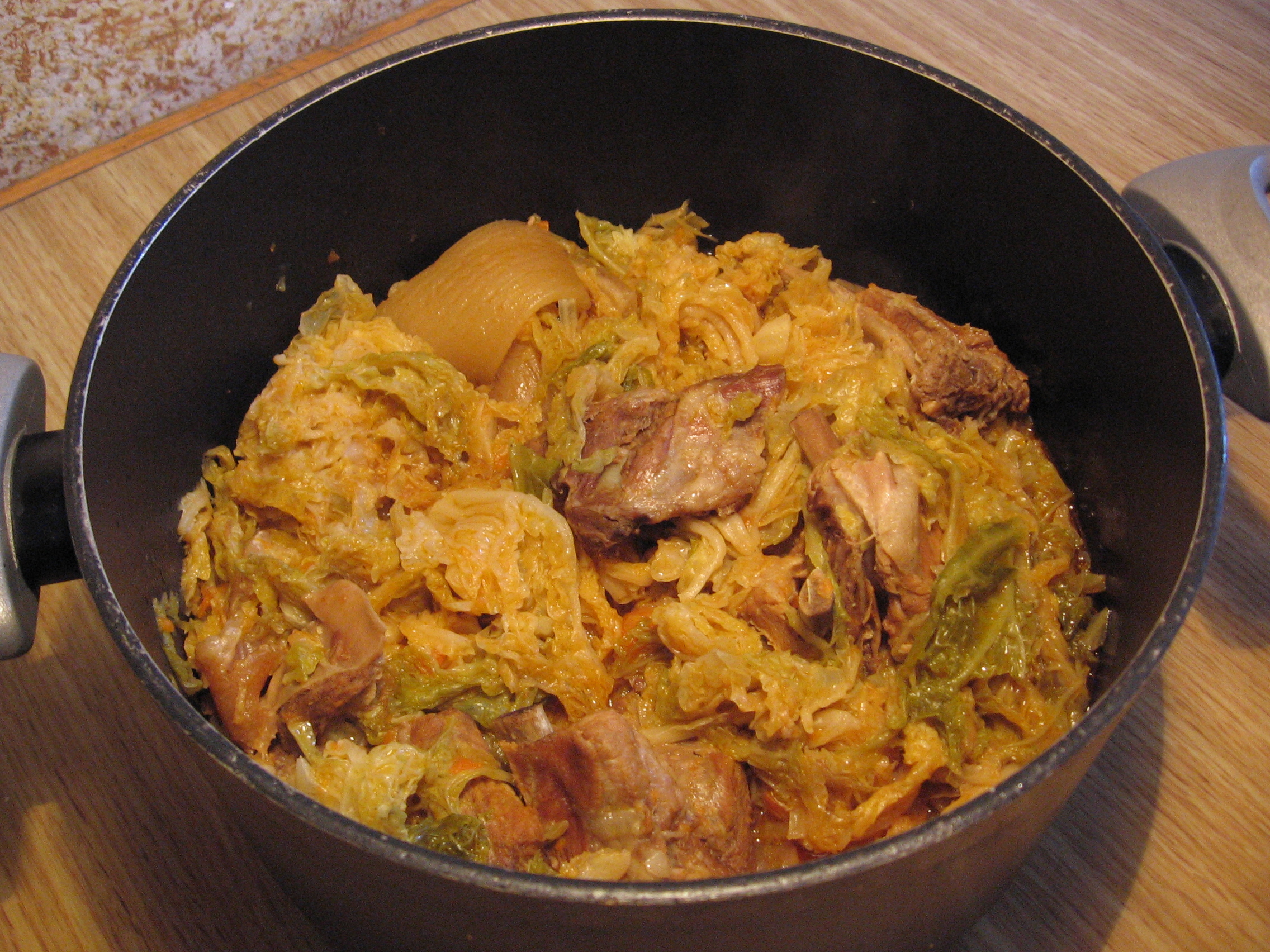
A dish of Cassoeula, common and popular in Milan and the area around the city during winter

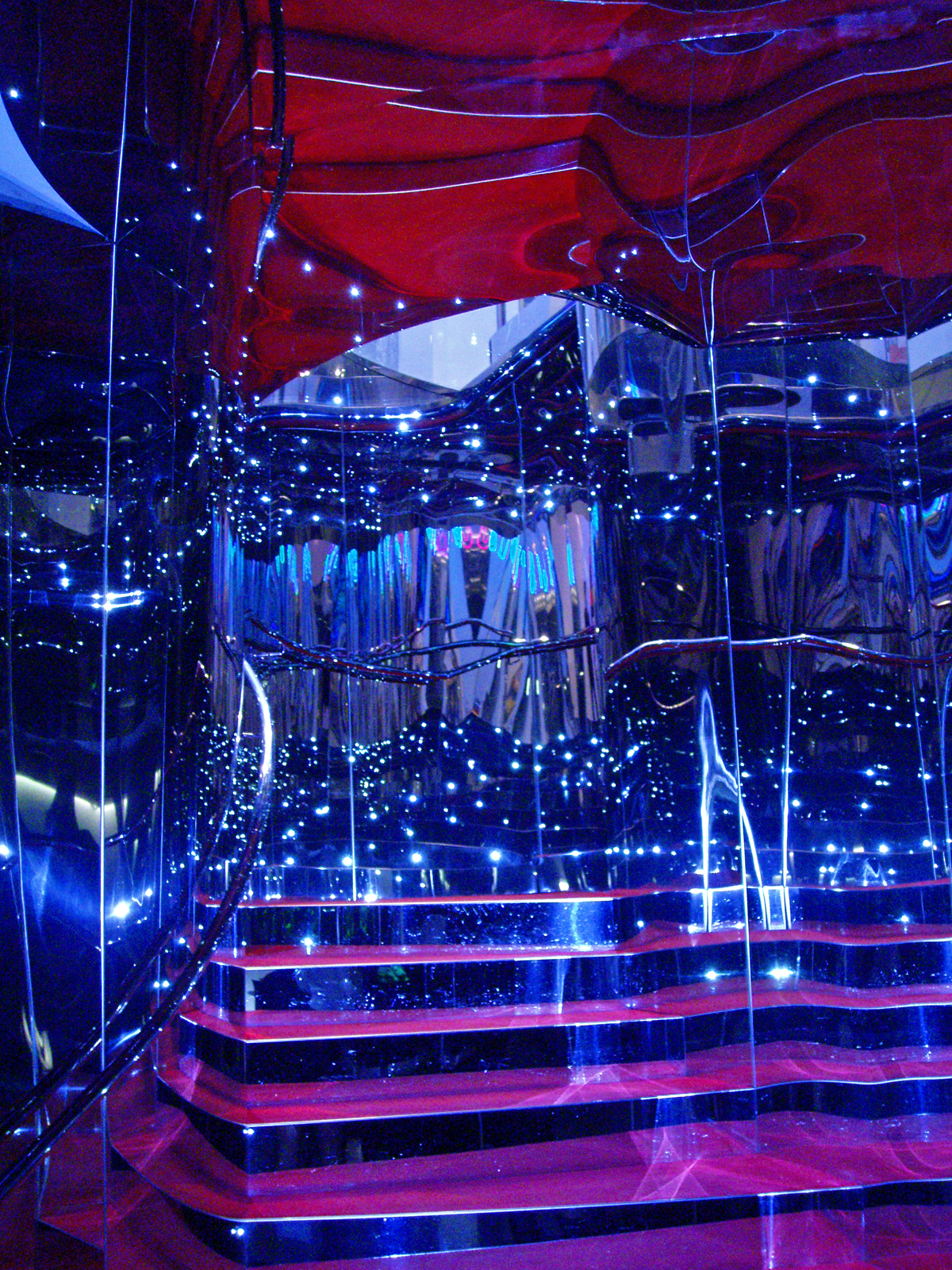
The funky interior of the trendy Just Cavalli Café

Like most cities in Italy, Milan and its surrounding area has its own regional cuisine, which, as it is typical for Lombard cuisines, uses more frequently rice than pasta, and features almost no tomato. Milanese cuisine includes "cotoletta alla milanese", a breaded veal (pork and turkey can be used) cutlet pan-fried in butter. Other typical dishes are cassoeula (stewed pork rib chops and sausage with Savoy cabbage), ossobuco (stewed veal shank with a sauce called gremolata), risotto alla milanese (with saffron and beef marrow), busecca (stewed tripe with beans), and brasato (stewed beef or pork with wine and potatoes). Season-related pastries include chiacchiere (flat fritters dusted with sugar) and tortelli (fried spherical cookies) for Carnival, colomba (glazed cake shaped as a dove) for Easter, pane dei morti ("Deads' Day bread", cookies aromatized with cinnamon) for All Soul's Day and panettone for Christmas. The salame milano, a salami with a very fine grain, is widespread throughout Italy. The best known Milanese cheese is gorgonzola from the namesake town nearby, although today the major gorgonzola producers operate in Piedmont.

On addition to a unique cuisine, Milan has several world-renowned restaurants and cafés. Most of the more refined and upper-class restaurants are found in the historic centre, whilst the more traditional and popular ones are mainly located in the Brera and Navigli districts. Today, there is also a Nobu Japanese restaurant in Milan, which is located in Armani World in Via Manzoni and is regarded as being one of the trendiest restaurants in the city. One of the city's chicest cafés or pasticcerie is the Caffè Cova, an ancient Milanese coffeehouse founded in 1817 near the Teatro alla Scala, which has also opened franchises in Hong Kong. The Biffi Caffè and the Zucca in Galleria are also famous and historical ‘Caffès’ which are situated in Milan. Other restaurants in Milan include the Hotel Four Seasons restaurant, ‘La Briciola’, the Marino alla Scala and the Chandelier. Today, there is also a McDonald's fast-food restaurant in the Galleria Vittorio Emanuele II, and some new boutique-cafés, such as the Just Cavalli Café, owned by the luxury fashion goods brand Roberto Cavalli.

== Cinema ==
Several (especially Italian) films have been set in Milan, including "Calmi Cuori Appassionati"', "The International (2009 film)", "La mala ordina", "Milano calibro 9", "Miracle in Milan", "La notte", and "Rocco and His Brothers".

== Sports ==
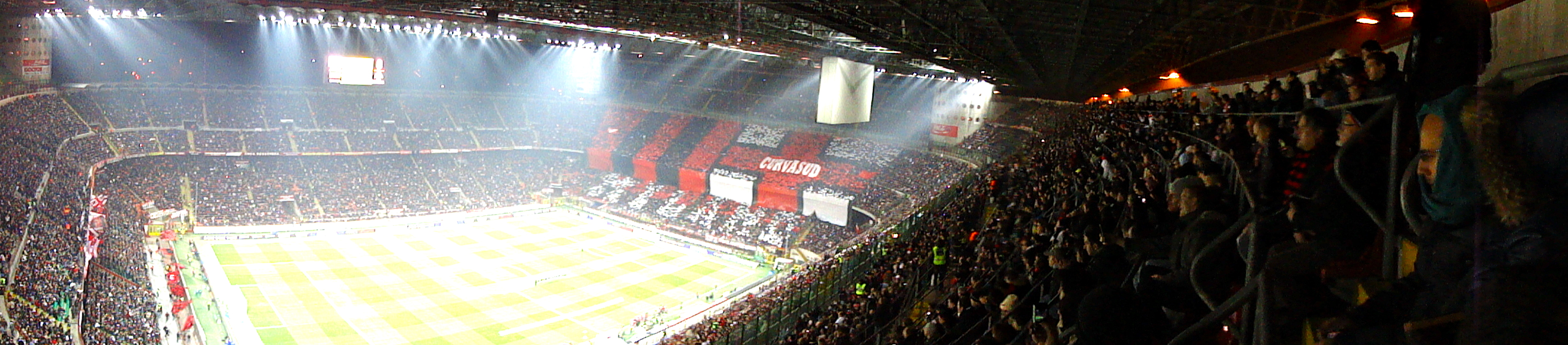
San Siro Stadium, one of the biggest in Europe

The city hosted, among other events, the FIFA World Cup in 1934 and 1990, the UEFA European Football Championship in 1980.

Football is the most popular sport in Italy, and Milan is home to two world-famous football teams: A.C. Milan and Internazionale. The former is normally referred to as "Mìlan" (notice the stress on the first syllable, unlike the English and Milanese name of the city), the latter as "Inter".

Milan is the only city in Europe whose teams have won both the European Cup and the Intercontinental Cup. Both teams play at Giuseppe Meazza - San Siro Stadium (85,700). Many of the strongest Italian football players were born in Milan, in the surrounding metropolitan area, or in Lombardy: Valentino Mazzola, Paolo Maldini, Giuseppe Meazza, Giacinto Facchetti, Gigi Riva, Gaetano Scirea, Giuseppe Bergomi, Walter Zenga, Antonio Cabrini, Roberto Donadoni, Gianluca Vialli, Silvio Piola, Giampiero Boniperti, Gabriele Oriali, Giovanni Trapattoni and Franco Baresi as well as many others.

- The famous Monza Formula One circuit is located near the city, inside a wide park. It is one of the world's oldest car racing circuits. The capacity for the F1 races is currently around 137,000 spectators, although in the 1950s the stands could hold more than 250,000. It has hosted an F1 race nearly every year since the first year of competition, exception made of 1980.
- Olimpia Milano is a successful European basketball team. It is the most important Italian team and one of the top 5 in Europe. Olimpia play at the Forum (capacity 14,000)
- Rhinos Milano is the oldest American football team in Milan (and in Italy) and have won five Italian Super Bowls. They are one of the five foundation clubs of the AIFA (Associazione Italiana American Football), established first championship in 1981. They also are one of the seven foundation clubs of the Italian Football League.
- Milano 1946 is the oldest baseball club in Milan and have won eight Italian Scudetti. Since 2019 there is also a softball team, now playing in "serie B"
- The Amatori Rugby Milano have won 18 National Championships and are the most famous and important Rugby team in Italy.
- Different ice hockey teams from Milan have won 30 National Championships between them. The Vipers Milano have won the last 5 national championships, the Alpenliga and several Coppa Italia, and are the leaders of that sport in Italy. They play at the Agora Stadium (capacity 4,500) during the regular season, and at the Forum during playoffs
- Every year, Milan hosts the Bonfiglio Trophy Under 18 Tennis Tournament. It is the most important youth tournament in the world, and is played at the Milan Tennis Club. The central court has a capacity of 8000. Past winners include Tacchini, Jan Kodeš, Adriano Panatta, Corrado Barazzutti, Moreno, Björn Borg, Smid, Ivan Lendl, Guy Forget, Jim Courier, Goran Ivanišević, Yevgeny Kafelnikov, and Guillermo Coria.

Milan and Lombardy are candidates for the Winter Olympic Games of 2026 ("Milan-Cortina 2026").

=== Stadia ===
- Autodromo Nazionale Monza - car and motorcycle racing - 137,000
- San Siro - only football; Milan and Inter - 85,700
- Arena Civica - Athletics, Rugby, Football, American Football 30,000
- Brianteo - Athletics, Football - 18,568
- Ippodromo del Trotter - Horse Racing - 16,000
- Ippodromo del Galoppo - Horse Racing - 15,000
- JF Kennedy - Baseball - 3,000
- Datch Forum - Basketball, Ice Hockey, Volleyball, Music - 9,000 to 12,000
- Velodromo Vigorelli - Cycling, American Football - 8,000
- PalaSharp (formerly MazdaPalace)- Basketball, Volleyball - 8,500 to 9,000
- PalaLido - Basketball - 5,000
- Agorà - Ice Hockey - 4,000
- Nuovo Giuriati - Rugby - 4,000

There are other stadiums and multiuse palaces located in the metropolitan area, the biggest being Monza Brianteo Stadium (18,000 seats), the PalaDesio (10,000) and Geas Stadium (8,500).

Club	League	Sport	Venue	Established	Championships
A.C. Milan	Serie A	Football	San Siro - Giuseppe Meazza	1899	4 World Club cups; 7 European championship; 18 Italian championship; 2 Cup Winners' Cup
F.C. Internazionale Milano	Serie A	Football	San Siro - Giuseppe Meazza	1908	2 World Club cups; 3 European championship; 18 Italian championship; 3 Uefa Cup
Olimpia Milano	Serie A	Basketball	Datchforum	1936	1 World cup; 3 European championship; 25 Italian championship; 3 Cup Winners' Cup; 2 Korac cup
H.C. Milano/Milano Vipers	Serie A	Ice Hockey	Agorà	1924	2 European championship; 20 Italian championship
H.C. Diavoli/Devils	Serie A	Ice Hockey	–	1930	3 European championship; 7 Italian championship
Amatori Rugby Milano	Serie B	Rugby	Stadio Giuriati	1928	18 Italian championship
Rhinos Milano	Serie A2	American Football	Velodromo Vigorelli-Maspes	1976	5 Italian championship
