= Cazzola (disambiguation) =

Cazzola may refer to:

== Cooking ==
- Cassoeula (Italianized cazzuola or cazzola), typical winter dish popular in Northern Italy, mostly in Lombardy

== Organisations ==
- Lanificio Cazzola, textile company

== Places ==
- Cazzola, Italy, subdivision of the municipality of Traversetolo, in the province of Parma, Italy
- Monte Cazzola, mount located in Piedmont, Italy

== People ==
- Alfredo Cazzola, businessman
- Clementina Cazzola, theater actress
- Fabio Cazzola, footballer
- Gabriele Cazzola, director and television writer
- Giuliano Cazzola, economist and politician
- Paola Cazzola, motorcyclist
- Pier Giorgio Cazzola, sprinter
- Pietro Cazzola, businessman
- Umberto Cazzola, footballer
- Riccardo Cazzola, footballer

== Surname ==
- Cazzola, Italian family name

== See also ==
- Gazzola (disambiguation)
