= Cazzola =

Italian family name

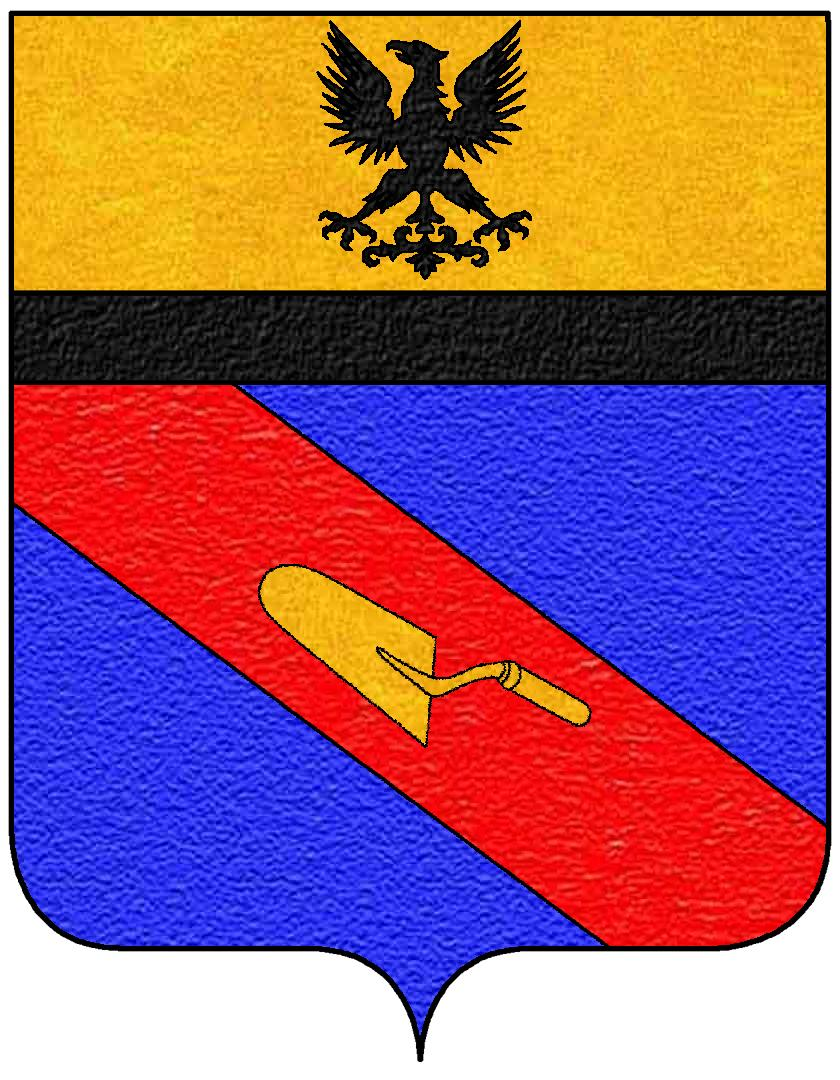
The coat of arms of Cazzola consignori of Montabone

Cazzola is an Italian family name.

== Origins ==
The two hypotheses on the origin of the surname Cazzola are the topographical and the professional. Cazzola could derive from Cassola, a municipality in the province of Vicenza, or from Cazzola, a frazione of the municipality of Traversetolo, in the province of Parma. Alternatively, the founder of the family could have had a nickname related to his work as a manufacturer or a seller of pans (in Italian, casseruola), or a bricklayer and be named for the cazzuola or cazzola (trowel).

== History ==
In a document of 1485, the family is referred to as Cazolus, Cazoli, Cazola. Among the family's historical figures were Chiara Cazzola, spouse of Bernabò Visconti, and Pagano Cazzola, who was one of the compilers of the statutes of Milan. One included a consignor of Montabone.

== Diffusion ==
The surname Cazzola is popular in Northern Italy and is very common in the province of Vicenza (especially in the municipalities of Malo, Schio, Vicenza, Isola Vicentina, Arzignano, Monticello, Valdagno, Grumolo delle Abbadesse, Caldogno and Costabissara). It is common also in the province of Alessandria (Acqui Terme and Alessandria), in the province of Asti (Montabone and Vaglio Serra) in the province of Pavia (Voghera, Verrua Po, Pavia, Pinarolo Po, Castelletto di Branduzzo and Bressana Bottarone), in province of Sondrio (Cosio Valtellino), in the province of Ferrara (Ferrara, Goro and Copparo) in the province of Bologna (Bologna and Argelato) as well as in Genoa and Savona.

From Italian emigration to North America, this surname is also present in the United States primarily in New York, Florida and Texas.

== Notables ==
Notable Cazzola's include Alfredo (businessman), Clementina (theater actress), Fabio (ex-footballer), Gabriele (director and television writer), Giuliano (economist and politician), Paola (motorcyclist), Pier Giorgio (sprinter), Pietro (entrepreneur), Umberto (footballer) and Riccardo (footballer), Walter (computer scientist).
