= Gazzola (disambiguation) =

Gazzola is a municipality in Piacenza, Emilia-Romagna, Italy.

Gazzola may also refer to:

- Gazzola (cycling team), a cycling team
- Gazzola (surname), an Italian surname
- Gazzola Institute, Piacenza, a school of the arts and art museum in Gzazzola, Italy
- Gazzola and Vaccaro Building, a historic commercial building in Brinkley, Arkansas
- Gazzola unicolor, a species of crow

== See also ==
- Cazzola (disambiguation)
