= Casole (disambiguation) =

Casole may refer to:

- Casole, a village in San Marino
- Casole Bruzio, town in the province of Cosenza in the Calabria region of southern Italy
- Casole d'Elsa, municipality in the Province of Siena in the Italian region Tuscany

== See also ==
- Casola (disambiguation)
