= Gazzolo =

Gazzolo (pronounced [ɡadˈdzɔːlo]) is an Italian surname derived from place names in Northern Italy. Notable people with the surname include:

- Benjamín Gazzolo (born 1997), Chilean footballer
- Lauro Gazzolo (1900–1970), Italian actor and voice actor
- Nando Gazzolo (1928–2015), Italian actor and voice actor

== See also ==
- Gazzola (surname)
- Gazzoli
