= Gazzoli =

Gazzoli (pronounced [ɡadˈdzɔːli]) is an Italian surname derived from place names in Northern Italy. Notable people with the surname include:

- Chiara Gazzoli (born 1978), Italian footballer
- Gianluca Gazzoli (born 1988), Italian radio personality, television presenter and YouTuber
- Massimo Gazzoli (born 1975), Italian footballer
- Michele Gazzoli (born 1999), Italian cyclist

== See also ==
- Gazzola (surname)
- Gazzolo
