= Casola =

Casola may refer to:

- Casola di Napoli, municipality in the Metropolitan City of Naples in the Italian region Campania
- Casola in Lunigiana, municipality in the Province of Massa and Carrara in the Italian region Tuscany
- Casola Valsenio, municipality in the Province of Ravenna in the Italian region Emilia-Romagna

== See also ==
- Casole (disambiguation)
- Cassola (disambiguation)
