= Gazzola (surname) =

Gazzola (pronounced [ɡadˈdzɔːla]) is an Italian surname derived from place names in Northern Italy. Notable people with the surname include:

- Alessia Gazzola (born 1982), Italian novelist
- Gianandrea Gazzola (born 1948), Italian designer, scenographer and former comedian and musician
- John Gazzola (born 1957), Australian politician
- Marcello Gazzola (born 1985), Italian footballer
- Randy Gazzola (born 1993), Canadian ice hockey player
- Valeria Gazzola (born 1977), Italian neuroscientist and academic

== See also ==
- Gazzola, Emilia-Romagna
- Gazzolo
- Gazzoli
