= San Siro Stables =

San Siro Stables, also known as Scuderie De Montel, were built in Milan between 1914 and 1924 by De Montel, a Jewish Milanese aristocrat. In 1938, following the application of racial laws in Italy, the government took possession of the buildings.

== Recent developments ==
In 2006 Consorzio Stabile SPA, a conglomerate made of local building companies won the public tender issued by the City Council of Milan to rebuild the baths of Milan on the grounds of the former San Siro stables. The project was later abandoned by the same city government that launched it.
