= Umberto Cazzola =

Italian football midfielder

Personal information
- Date of birth: 12 January 1982 (age 44)
- Place of birth: Fano, Italy
- Height: 1.85 m (6 ft 1 in)
- Position: Midfielder

Senior career*
Years	Team	Apps	(Gls)
2000–2002	Fano	46	(1)
2002–2005	Vis Pesaro	81	(4)
2005–2006	Ravenna	22	(5)
2006–2007	Bari	9	(0)
2007–2008	Ancona	32	(3)
2008–2009	Taranto	17	(0)
2009	SPAL	10	(0)
2009–2010	Perugia	25	(0)
2010–2011	Ravenna	29	(2)
2011–2012	Varese	3	(0)
2012–2013	Fano	41	(4)
2013–2016	Ancona	55	(1)
2016–2017	Fano	23	(0)
2017–2018	Gubbio	20	(1)
- * Club domestic league appearances and goals as of 15 April 2018

Umberto Cazzola (born 12 January 1982) is an Italian football midfielder.

== Caps on Italian Series ==
Serie B : 9 apps

Serie C1 : 196 apps, 12 goals

Serie D : 46 apps, 1 goal

Total : 251 apps, 13 goals
