= Cassoeula =

Italian pork dish

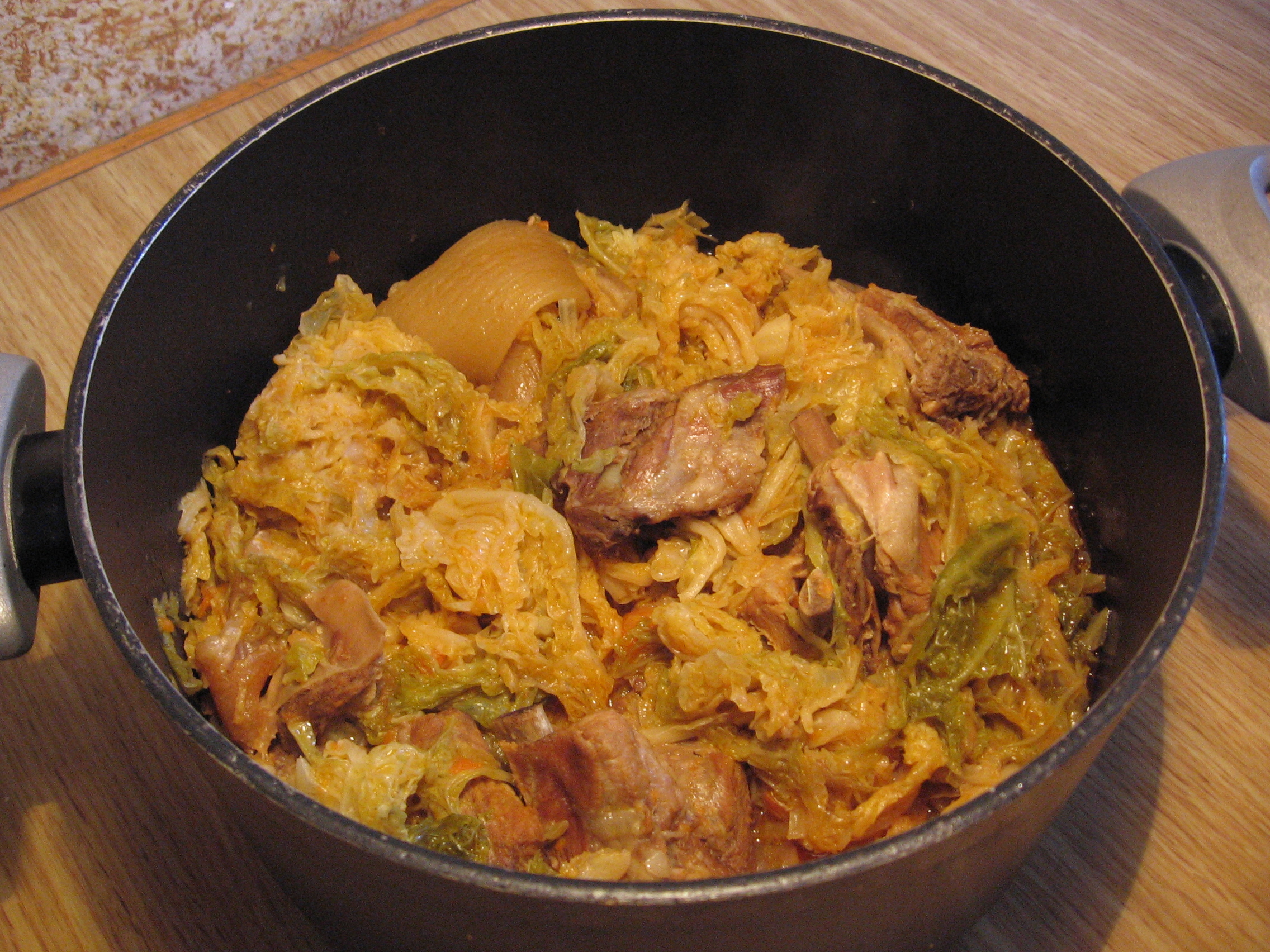
- A pot of cassoeula
- Alternative names: Cazzoeula (in Lombard), cassola, cazzuola, cazzola, bottaggio (in Italian)
- Course: Secondo (Italian course)
- Place of origin: Italy
- Region or state: Lombardy
- Associated cuisine: Italian (Lombard)
- Main ingredients: Savoy cabbage, pork ribs, skin, trotters, head, etc.

Cassoeula or cazzoeula (Western Lombard: [kaˈ(t)søːla, kaˈtsøːra]), sometimes Italianized as cassola, cazzuola or cazzola (the word for 'trowel', etymologically unrelated), or bottaggio (probably derived from the French word potage), is a typical winter dish popular in western Lombardy, Italy, chiefly made from pork and Savoy cabbage. The dish has a strong, decisive flavour, and was a favourite of conductor Arturo Toscanini. One writer describes it as a "noble, ancient Milanese dish", and writes of the inexpressible "pleasure that it furnishes the soul as well as the palate, especially on a wintry day".

== Origins ==
One account of the origins of the dish associates it with the January 17 celebration of St Anthony the Abbot, which coincided with the end of the pig-slaughtering season. The parts of the pig used for the dish were those ready for consumption immediately after slaughter, whereas the better cuts of meat would be hung to improve the flavour.

Another legend traces the origins of the dish to the 16th century, when Spain ruled Milan; it tells how an army officer taught the recipe to his lover, who cooked for a noble Milanese family, and the dish was well-received and became popular.

The Spanish period origin is put under discussion by the existence in the 12th century of a dish called mangiacaxöla in the Lombard comune (municipality) of Busto Arsizio, which leads to think the recipe is way older.

== Ingredients ==
The meat used in the dish includes mainly pork meat (usually least valuable parts like ribs, rind, head, trotters, ears, nose and tail), Verzino sausage, and sometimes other meats like chicken and goose. These are cooked in a casserole (hence its name) with ingredients such as onion, carrot, celery and black pepper for about two and a half hours, after which Savoy cabbage is added and cooking continues for a further half-hour.

Usually, cassoeula is served with polenta and/or a strong red wine. It is tradition for this dish to be eaten starting after the first frost of the season, to let the cabbage be softer and tastier.

== Variations ==
Many variations of this dish exist across the territory, but all of them share the use of cabbage. For example, in the province of Como the head is used, but not the trotters, in the province of Pavia only the ribs are used, and in the province of Novara, Piedmont, goose is added.

== See also ==
- Cassoulet, an Occitan/French dish of similar etymology and preparation
- Bigos, a Polish dish of sauerkraut and fresh cabbage stewed with meats and mushrooms, traditionally served at Christmas
