= Cassola =

Cassola Casoła
- Comune
- Comune di Cassola
- Location within Italy Location within Veneto
- Coordinates: 45°44′N 11°47′E
- Country: Italy
- Region: Veneto
- Province: Vicenza (VI)
- Frazioni: Marini, San Giuseppe, San Zeno

Area
  - Total: 12.74 km^{2} (4.92 sq mi)
- Elevation: 92 m (302 ft)

Population (31 December 2018)
  - Total: 14.836
  - Density: 1.165/km^{2} (3.016/sq mi)
- Time zone: UTC+1 (CET)
  - Summer (DST): UTC+2 (CEST)
- Postal code: 36022
- Dialing code: 0424
- ISTAT code: 024026
- Patron saint: San Marco
- Saint day: 25 April
- Website: Official website

Cassola ([kas'sɔːla] Venetian: Casoła) is a town in the province of Vicenza, Veneto, Italy. It is south of SP90. As of 2007 Cassola had an estimated population of 13,997.

Cassola is the center where the town hall is located. However, the most populated center of the town is San Giuseppe, also known as Termine di Cassola. In the square of San Giuseppe di Cassola there is a municipal building where the town library and a detached municipal office are located.

== Toponym ==
According to the earliest sources available, the name Cassola derives from the union of the words "casa" and "sola" ("house" and "alone"), as it would seem that there was only one house in the current town territory, a wooded area at that time.

== Sources ==
- (Google Maps)
